= 2014 California State Assembly election =

- November 4, 2014

All 80 seats in the California State Assembly 41 seats needed for a majority
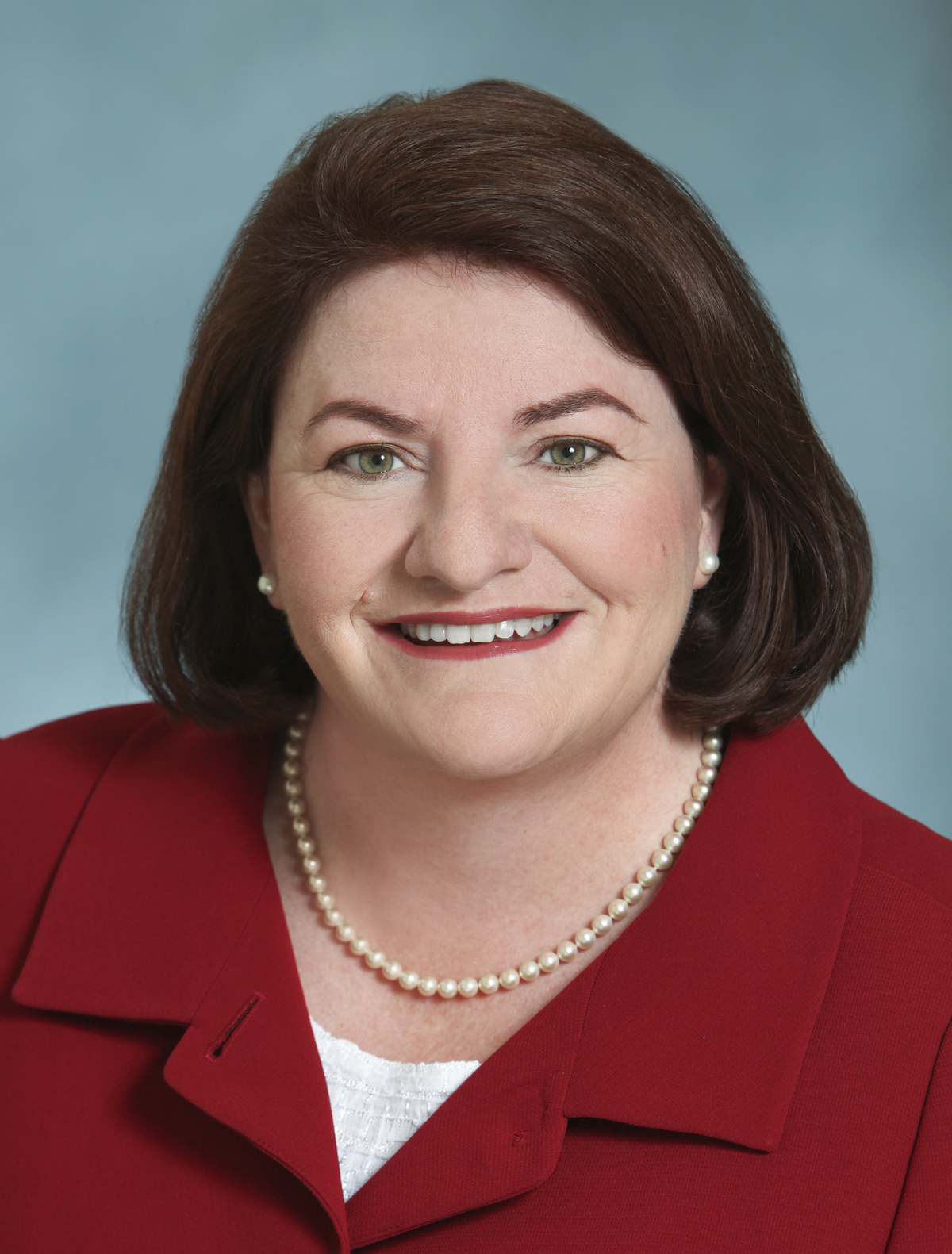

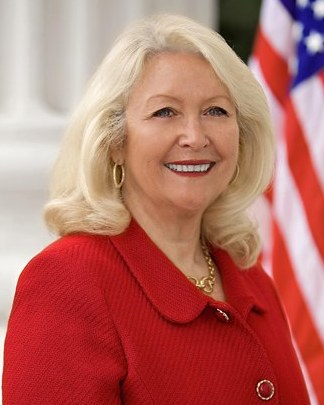
| | Majority party | Minority party |
|---|---|---|
| Leader | Toni Atkins | Connie Conway (retired) |
| Party | Democratic | Republican |
| Leader since | May 12, 2014 | December 6, 2010 |
| Leader's seat | 78th–San Diego | 26th–Tulare |
| Last election | 55 seats, 58.46% | 25 seats, 40.76% |
| Seats after | 52 | 28 |
| Seat change | ▼3 | ▲3 |
| Popular vote | 3,774,608 | 3,067,470 |
| Percentage | 54.54% | 44.32% |
| Swing | ▼3.92% | ▲3.56% |
- Democratic gain Republican gain Democratic hold Republican hold 50–60% 60–70% 70–80% 80–90% >90% 50–60% 60–70% 70–80% >90%
Speaker before election
Toni Atkins
Democratic
Elected Speaker
Toni Atkins
Democratic

The 2014 California State Assembly elections were held on Tuesday, November 4, 2014, with the primary election held on June 3, 2014, coinciding with the elections of State Senate elections and other races, including the gubernatorial election.

Ultimately, the elections saw the California Republican Party pick up districts 16, 36, 65, 66, and recapture the vacant district 40, while losing district 44, thus rolling back the three-seat gain that the Democrats made in the 2012 elections, and ending their two-thirds supermajority in the chamber.

== Overview ==
California State Assembly elections, 2014 Primary election – June 3, 2014
| Party | Votes | Percentage | Candidates | Advancing to general | Seats contesting |
|---|---|---|---|---|---|
| Democratic | 2,150,805 | 54.5% | 124 | 82 | 74 |
| Republican | 1,770,085 | 44.9% | 108 | 71 | 67 |
| No party preference | 10,166 | 0.3% | 6 | 1 | 1 |
| Green | 7,853 | 0.2% | 1 | 0 | 0 |
| Libertarian | 5,022 | 0.1% | 5 | 1 | 1 |
| Peace and Freedom | 2,426 | 0.1% | 1 | 0 | 0 |
| American Independent | 115 | 0.0% | 1 | 1 | 1 |
| Valid votes | 3,946,472 | 88.5% | — | — | — |
| Invalid votes | 514,874 | 11.5% | — | — | — |
| Totals | 4,461,346 | 100.0% | 246 | 156 | — |
| Voter turnout | 25.2% | | | | |

California State Assembly elections, 2014 General election – November 4, 2014
| Party | Votes | Percentage | Seats | +/– |
|---|---|---|---|---|
| Democratic | 3,774,608 | 54.5% | 52 | ▼3 |
| Republican | 3,067,470 | 44.3% | 28 | ▲4 |
| Libertarian | 30,735 | 0.4% | 0 | Steady |
| American Independent | 30,266 | 0.4% | 0 | Steady |
| No party preference | 18,017 | 0.3% | 0 | Steady |
| Valid votes | 6,921,096 | 92.1% | — | — |
| Invalid votes | 592,876 | 7.9% | — | — |
| Totals | 7,513,972 | 100.0% | 80 | — |
| Voter turnout | 42.2% | | | |

↓
| 52 | 28 |
| Democratic | Republican |

== Predictions ==
| Source | Ranking | As of |
|---|---|---|
| Governing | Safe D | October 20, 2014 |

== Results ==
=== District 1 ===
California's 1st State Assembly district election, 2014
Primary election
| Party | Candidate | Votes | % |
|---|---|---|---|
| Republican | Brian Dahle (incumbent) | 65,466 | 69.5 |
| Democratic | Brigham Sawyer Smith | 28,688 | 30.5 |
| Total votes | | 94,154 | 100.0 |
General election
| Republican | Brian Dahle (incumbent) | 104,103 | 70.2 |
| Democratic | Brigham Sawyer Smith | 44,119 | 29.8 |
| Total votes | | 148,222 | 100.0 |
| Republican hold | | | |

=== District 2 ===
California's 2nd State Assembly district election, 2014
Primary election
| Party | Candidate | Votes | % |
|---|---|---|---|
| Democratic | Jim Wood | 37,244 | 41.2 |
| Republican | Matt Heath | 28,866 | 31.9 |
| Democratic | John Lowry | 16,464 | 18.2 |
| Green | Pamela Elizondo | 7,853 | 8.7 |
| Total votes | | 90,427 | 100.0 |
General election
| Democratic | Jim Wood | 85,045 | 65.1 |
| Republican | Matt Heath | 45,553 | 34.9 |
| Total votes | | 130,598 | 100.0 |
| Democratic hold | | | |

=== District 3 ===
California's 3rd State Assembly district election, 2014
Primary election
| Party | Candidate | Votes | % |
|---|---|---|---|
| Republican | James Gallagher | 34,744 | 44.4 |
| Democratic | Jim Reed | 26,557 | 34.0 |
| Republican | Ryan Schohr | 16,906 | 21.6 |
| Total votes | | 78,207 | 100.0 |
General election
| Republican | James Gallagher | 69,552 | 63.1 |
| Democratic | Jim Reed | 40,732 | 36.9 |
| Total votes | | 104,284 | 100.0 |
| Republican hold | | | |

=== District 4 ===
California's 4th State Assembly district election, 2014
Primary election
| Party | Candidate | Votes | % |
|---|---|---|---|
| Democratic | Bill Dodd | 22,168 | 26.4 |
| Republican | Charlie Schaupp | 21,873 | 26.1 |
| Democratic | Dan Wolk | 19,963 | 23.8 |
| Democratic | Joe Krovoza | 14,993 | 17.9 |
| Republican | Dustin Call | 4,939 | 5.9 |
| Total votes | | 83,936 | 100.0 |
General election
| Democratic | Bill Dodd | 70,598 | 61.6 |
| Republican | Charlie Schaupp | 43,981 | 38.4 |
| Total votes | | 114,579 | 100.0 |
| Democratic hold | | | |

=== District 5 ===
California's 5th State Assembly district election, 2014
Primary election
| Party | Candidate | Votes | % |
|---|---|---|---|
| Republican | Frank Bigelow (incumbent) | 67,924 | 99.9 |
| Libertarian | Patrick D. Hogan (write-in) | 60 | 0.1 |
| Total votes | | 67,984 | 100.0 |
General election
| Republican | Frank Bigelow (incumbent) | 88,602 | 74.2 |
| Libertarian | Patrick D. Hogan | 30,735 | 25.8 |
| Total votes | | 119,337 | 100.0 |
| Republican hold | | | |

=== District 6 ===
California's 6th State Assembly district election, 2014
Primary election
| Party | Candidate | Votes | % |
|---|---|---|---|
| Republican | Beth Gaines (incumbent) | 55,167 | 64.3 |
| Democratic | Brian Caples | 30,575 | 35.7 |
| Total votes | | 85,742 | 100.0 |
General election
| Republican | Beth Gaines (incumbent) | 94,020 | 65.7 |
| Democratic | Brian Caples | 49,044 | 34.3 |
| Total votes | | 143,064 | 100.0 |
| Republican hold | | | |

=== District 7 ===
California's 7th State Assembly district election, 2014
Primary election
| Party | Candidate | Votes | % |
|---|---|---|---|
| Democratic | Kevin McCarty | 18,935 | 34.9 |
| Democratic | Steve Cohn | 15,877 | 29.3 |
| Republican | Ralph Merletti | 8,115 | 15.0 |
| Democratic | Mark Johannessen | 6,413 | 11.8 |
| Republican | Oliver Ponce | 4,869 | 9.0 |
| Total votes | | 54,209 | 100.0 |
General election
| Democratic | Kevin McCarty | 46,983 | 58.7 |
| Democratic | Steve Cohn | 33,051 | 41.3 |
| Total votes | | 80,034 | 100.0 |
| Democratic hold | | | |

=== District 8 ===
California's 8th State Assembly district election, 2014
Primary election
| Party | Candidate | Votes | % |
|---|---|---|---|
| Democratic | Ken Cooley (incumbent) | 35,294 | 51.8 |
| Republican | Douglas Haaland | 28,049 | 41.1 |
| Libertarian | Janice Marlae Bonser | 4,830 | 7.1 |
| Total votes | | 68,173 | 100.0 |
General election
| Democratic | Ken Cooley (incumbent) | 62,892 | 56.7 |
| Republican | Douglas Haaland | 48,057 | 43.3 |
| Total votes | | 110,949 | 100.0 |
| Democratic hold | | | |

=== District 9 ===
California's 9th State Assembly district election, 2014
Primary election
| Party | Candidate | Votes | % |
|---|---|---|---|
| Democratic | Jim Cooper | 18,923 | 31.1 |
| Democratic | Darrell Fong | 17,752 | 29.2 |
| Republican | Tim Gorsulowsky | 10,938 | 18.0 |
| Republican | Manuel J. Martin | 8,111 | 13.3 |
| Democratic | Diana Rodriguez-Suruki | 5,080 | 8.4 |
| Total votes | | 60,804 | 100.0 |
General election
| Democratic | Jim Cooper | 50,188 | 55.5 |
| Democratic | Darrell Fong | 40,220 | 44.5 |
| Total votes | | 90,408 | 100.0 |
| Democratic hold | | | |

=== District 10 ===
California's 10th State Assembly district election, 2014
Primary election
| Party | Candidate | Votes | % |
|---|---|---|---|
| Democratic | Marc Levine (incumbent) | 45,597 | 49.2 |
| Republican | Gregory Allen | 18,705 | 20.2 |
| Democratic | Diana M. Conti | 16,644 | 18.0 |
| Democratic | Erin Carlstrom | 7,092 | 7.7 |
| Democratic | Veronica "Roni" Jacobi | 4,593 | 5.0 |
| Total votes | | 92,631 | 100.0 |
General election
| Democratic | Marc Levine (incumbent) | 105,636 | 74.6 |
| Republican | Gregory Allen | 35,999 | 25.4 |
| Total votes | | 141,635 | 100.0 |
| Democratic hold | | | |

=== District 11 ===
California's 11th State Assembly district election, 2014
Primary election
| Party | Candidate | Votes | % |
|---|---|---|---|
| Democratic | Jim Frazier (incumbent) | 30,893 | 60.7 |
| Republican | Alex Henthorn | 20,002 | 39.3 |
| Total votes | | 50,895 | 100.0 |
General election
| Democratic | Jim Frazier (incumbent) | 54,044 | 59.7 |
| Republican | Alex Henthorn | 36,475 | 40.3 |
| Total votes | | 90,519 | 100.0 |
| Democratic hold | | | |

=== District 12 ===
California's 12th State Assembly district election, 2014
Primary election
| Party | Candidate | Votes | % |
|---|---|---|---|
| Republican | Kristin Olsen (incumbent) | 38,892 | 67.5 |
| Democratic | Harinder Grewal | 18,742 | 32.5 |
| Total votes | | 57,634 | 100.0 |
General election
| Republican | Kristin Olsen (incumbent) | 63,003 | 67.2 |
| Democratic | Harinder Grewal | 30,752 | 32.8 |
| Total votes | | 93,755 | 100.0 |
| Republican hold | | | |

=== District 13 ===
California's 13th State Assembly district election, 2014
Primary election
| Party | Candidate | Votes | % |
|---|---|---|---|
| Democratic | Susan Eggman (incumbent) | 22,341 | 49.7 |
| Republican | Sol Jobrack | 14,318 | 31.8 |
| Democratic | Catherine Jennet Stebbins | 8,297 | 18.5 |
| Total votes | | 44,956 | 100.0 |
General election
| Democratic | Susan Eggman (incumbent) | 40,635 | 60.7 |
| Republican | Sol Jobrack | 26,254 | 39.3 |
| Total votes | | 66,889 | 100.0 |
| Democratic hold | | | |

=== District 14 ===
California's 14th State Assembly district election, 2014
Primary election
| Party | Candidate | Votes | % |
|---|---|---|---|
| Democratic | Susan Bonilla (incumbent) | 44,644 | 99.1 |
| Republican | Joy D. Delepine (write-in) | 366 | 0.8 |
| No party preference | John Henry Kimack (write-in) | 24 | 0.1 |
| Total votes | | 45,034 | 100.0 |
General election
| Democratic | Susan Bonilla (incumbent) | 69,325 | 68.9 |
| Republican | Joy D. Delepine | 31,298 | 31.1 |
| Total votes | | 100,623 | 100.0 |
| Democratic hold | | | |

=== District 15 ===
California's 15th State Assembly district election, 2014
Primary election
| Party | Candidate | Votes | % |
|---|---|---|---|
| Democratic | Elizabeth Echols | 21,664 | 31.1 |
| Democratic | Tony Thurmond | 16,963 | 24.4 |
| Democratic | Pamela Price | 11,898 | 17.1 |
| Republican | Rich Kinney | 7,531 | 10.8 |
| Democratic | Sam Kang | 4,630 | 6.7 |
| Democratic | Clarence Hunt | 3,329 | 4.8 |
| Peace and Freedom | Eugene E. Ruyle | 2,426 | 3.5 |
| No party preference | Bernt Rainer Wahl | 1,132 | 1.6 |
| Total votes | | 69,573 | 100.0 |
General election
| Democratic | Tony Thurmond | 66,661 | 54.3 |
| Democratic | Elizabeth Echols | 56,071 | 45.7 |
| Total votes | | 122,732 | 100.0 |
| Democratic hold | | | |

=== District 16 ===
California's 16th State Assembly district election, 2014
Primary election
| Party | Candidate | Votes | % |
|---|---|---|---|
| Republican | Catharine Baker | 31,632 | 36.7 |
| Democratic | Tim Sbranti | 25,217 | 29.2 |
| Democratic | Steve Glazer | 19,636 | 22.8 |
| Democratic | Newell Arnerich | 9,794 | 11.4 |
| Total votes | | 86,279 | 100.0 |
General election
| Republican | Catharine Baker | 71,452 | 51.6 |
| Democratic | Tim Sbranti | 67,152 | 48.4 |
| Total votes | | 138,604 | 100.0 |
| Republican gain from Democratic | | | |

=== District 17 ===
California's 17th State Assembly district election, 2014
Primary election
| Party | Candidate | Votes | % |
|---|---|---|---|
| Democratic | David Chiu | 34,863 | 48.0 |
| Democratic | David Campos | 31,951 | 44.0 |
| Republican | David Carlos Salaverry | 5,843 | 8.0 |
| Total votes | | 72,657 | 100.0 |
General election
| Democratic | David Chiu | 63,041 | 51.1 |
| Democratic | David Campos | 60,416 | 48.9 |
| Total votes | | 123,457 | 100.0 |
| Democratic hold | | | |

=== District 18 ===
California's 18th State Assembly district election, 2014
Primary election
| Party | Candidate | Votes | % |
|---|---|---|---|
| Democratic | Rob Bonta (incumbent) | 44,321 | 85.8 |
| Republican | David Erlich | 7,358 | 14.2 |
| Total votes | | 51,679 | 100.0 |
General election
| Democratic | Rob Bonta (incumbent) | 88,243 | 86.7 |
| Republican | David Erlich | 13,537 | 13.3 |
| Total votes | | 101,780 | 100.0 |
| Democratic hold | | | |

=== District 19 ===
California's 19th State Assembly district election, 2014
Primary election
| Party | Candidate | Votes | % |
|---|---|---|---|
| Democratic | Phil Ting (incumbent) | 45,103 | 77.6 |
| Republican | Rene Pineda | 12,985 | 22.4 |
| Total votes | | 58,088 | 100.0 |
General election
| Democratic | Phil Ting (incumbent) | 81,103 | 77.0 |
| Republican | Rene Pineda | 24,170 | 23.0 |
| Total votes | | 105,273 | 100.0 |
| Democratic hold | | | |

=== District 20 ===
California's 20th State Assembly district election, 2014
Primary election
| Party | Candidate | Votes | % |
|---|---|---|---|
| Democratic | Bill Quirk (incumbent) | 31,882 | 66.0 |
| Republican | Jaime Patino | 11,246 | 23.3 |
| No party preference | Luis Reynoso | 5,186 | 10.7 |
| Total votes | | 48,314 | 100.0 |
General election
| Democratic | Bill Quirk (incumbent) | 56,144 | 71.8 |
| Republican | Jaime Patino | 22,007 | 28.2 |
| Total votes | | 78,151 | 100.0 |
| Democratic hold | | | |

=== District 21 ===
California's 21st State Assembly district election, 2014
Primary election
| Party | Candidate | Votes | % |
|---|---|---|---|
| Democratic | Adam Gray (incumbent) | 26,015 | 95.3 |
| Republican | Jack Mobley (write-in) | 1,286 | 4.7 |
| Total votes | | 27,301 | 100.0 |
General election
| Democratic | Adam Gray (incumbent) | 34,931 | 53.4 |
| Republican | Jack Mobley | 30,499 | 46.6 |
| Total votes | | 65,430 | 100.0 |
| Democratic hold | | | |

=== District 22 ===
California's 22nd State Assembly district election, 2014
Primary election
| Party | Candidate | Votes | % |
|---|---|---|---|
| Democratic | Kevin Mullin (incumbent) | 42,575 | 71.0 |
| Republican | Mark Gilham | 9,053 | 15.1 |
| Republican | Jonathan Emmanuel Madison | 8,297 | 13.8 |
| Total votes | | 59,925 | 100.0 |
General election
| Democratic | Kevin Mullin (incumbent) | 73,928 | 70.6 |
| Republican | Mark Gilham | 30,781 | 29.4 |
| Total votes | | 104,709 | 100.0 |
| Democratic hold | | | |

=== District 23 ===
California's 23rd State Assembly district election, 2014
Primary election
| Party | Candidate | Votes | % |
|---|---|---|---|
| Republican | Jim Patterson (incumbent) | 55,914 | 100.0 |
| Total votes | | 55,914 | 100.0 |
General election
| Republican | Jim Patterson (incumbent) | 82,417 | 100.0 |
| Total votes | | 82,417 | 100.0 |
| Republican hold | | | |

=== District 24 ===
California's 24th State Assembly district election, 2014
Primary election
| Party | Candidate | Votes | % |
|---|---|---|---|
| Democratic | Rich Gordon (incumbent) | 38,758 | 60.1 |
| Republican | Diane Gabl | 18,021 | 27.9 |
| Democratic | Greg Coladonato | 7,738 | 12.0 |
| Total votes | | 64,517 | 100.0 |
General election
| Democratic | Rich Gordon (incumbent) | 77,986 | 70.0 |
| Republican | Diane Gabl | 33,419 | 30.0 |
| Total votes | | 111,405 | 100.0 |
| Democratic hold | | | |

=== District 25 ===
California's 25th State Assembly district election, 2014
Primary election
| Party | Candidate | Votes | % |
|---|---|---|---|
| Democratic | Kansen Chu | 16,672 | 30.6 |
| Republican | Bob Brunton | 12,699 | 23.3 |
| Democratic | Armando Gomez | 9,218 | 16.9 |
| Democratic | Teresa Cox | 9,104 | 16.7 |
| Democratic | Craig Steckler | 6,835 | 12.5 |
| Total votes | | 54,528 | 100.0 |
General election
| Democratic | Kansen Chu | 57,718 | 69.4 |
| Republican | Bob Brunton | 25,441 | 30.6 |
| Total votes | | 83,159 | 100.0 |
| Democratic hold | | | |

=== District 26 ===
California's 26th State Assembly district election, 2014
Primary election
| Party | Candidate | Votes | % |
|---|---|---|---|
| Republican | Rudy Mendoza | 18,648 | 40.3 |
| Republican | Devon Mathis | 9,497 | 20.5 |
| Democratic | Carlton Jones | 7,943 | 17.2 |
| Democratic | Ruben Macareno | 3,755 | 8.1 |
| Democratic | Derek A. Thomas | 2,872 | 6.2 |
| Republican | Teresita "Tess" Andres | 2,092 | 4.5 |
| Republican | Esther Barajas | 1,473 | 3.2 |
| Total votes | | 46,280 | 100.0 |
General election
| Republican | Devon Mathis | 34,683 | 53.6 |
| Republican | Rudy Mendoza | 29,991 | 46.4 |
| Total votes | | 64,674 | 100.0 |
| Republican hold | | | |

=== District 27 ===
California's 27th State Assembly district election, 2014
Primary election
| Party | Candidate | Votes | % |
|---|---|---|---|
| Democratic | Nora Campos (incumbent) | 34,799 | 69.5 |
| Republican | G. "Burt" Lancaster | 15,272 | 30.5 |
| Total votes | | 50,071 | 100.0 |
General election
| Democratic | Nora Campos (incumbent) | 49,416 | 69.4 |
| Republican | G. "Burt" Lancaster | 21,779 | 30.6 |
| Total votes | | 71,195 | 100.0 |
| Democratic hold | | | |

=== District 28 ===
California's 28th State Assembly district election, 2014
Primary election
| Party | Candidate | Votes | % |
|---|---|---|---|
| Democratic | Evan Low | 30,807 | 39.7 |
| Republican | Chuck Page | 20,895 | 26.9 |
| Democratic | Barry Chang | 19,156 | 24.7 |
| Republican | Michael Hunsweck | 6,732 | 8.7 |
| Total votes | | 77,590 | 100.0 |
General election
| Democratic | Evan Low | 71,239 | 59.4 |
| Republican | Chuck Page | 48,645 | 40.6 |
| Total votes | | 119,884 | 100.0 |
| Democratic hold | | | |

=== District 29 ===
California's 29th State Assembly district election, 2014
Primary election
| Party | Candidate | Votes | % |
|---|---|---|---|
| Democratic | Mark Stone (incumbent) | 58,117 | 68.4 |
| Republican | Palmer Kain | 26,905 | 31.6 |
| Total votes | | 85,022 | 100.0 |
General election
| Democratic | Mark Stone (incumbent) | 88,265 | 69.4 |
| Republican | Palmer Kain | 38,903 | 30.6 |
| Total votes | | 127,168 | 100.0 |
| Democratic hold | | | |

=== District 30 ===
California's 30th State Assembly district election, 2014
Primary election
| Party | Candidate | Votes | % |
|---|---|---|---|
| Democratic | Luis Alejo (incumbent) | 25,441 | 58.9 |
| Republican | Mark Starritt | 17,730 | 41.1 |
| Total votes | | 43,171 | 100.0 |
General election
| Democratic | Luis Alejo (incumbent) | 43,431 | 59.8 |
| Republican | Mark Starritt | 29,187 | 40.2 |
| Total votes | | 72,618 | 100.0 |
| Democratic hold | | | |

=== District 31 ===
California's 31st State Assembly district election, 2014
Primary election
| Party | Candidate | Votes | % |
|---|---|---|---|
| Democratic | Henry Perea (incumbent) | 24,853 | 99.9 |
| No party preference | Walter O. Villarreal (write-in) | 24 | 0.1 |
| Total votes | | 24,877 | 100.0 |
General election
| Democratic | Henry Perea (incumbent) | 36,165 | 66.7 |
| No party preference | Walter O. Villarreal | 18,017 | 33.3 |
| Total votes | | 54,182 | 100.0 |
| Democratic hold | | | |

=== District 32 ===
California's 32nd State Assembly district election, 2014
Primary election
| Party | Candidate | Votes | % |
|---|---|---|---|
| Democratic | Rudy Salas (incumbent) | 11,577 | 43.9 |
| Republican | Pedro A. Rios | 9,183 | 34.8 |
| Republican | Romeo Agbalog | 5,628 | 21.3 |
| Total votes | | 26,388 | 100.0 |
General election
| Democratic | Rudy Salas (incumbent) | 26,721 | 54.8 |
| Republican | Pedro A. Rios | 22,031 | 45.2 |
| Total votes | | 48,752 | 100.0 |
| Democratic hold | | | |

=== District 33 ===
California's 33rd State Assembly district election, 2014
Primary election
| Party | Candidate | Votes | % |
|---|---|---|---|
| Democratic | John Coffey | 9,865 | 23.1 |
| Republican | Jay Obernolte | 8,028 | 18.8 |
| Republican | Michelle Ambrozic | 7,566 | 17.7 |
| Republican | Rick Roelle | 6,574 | 15.4 |
| Republican | Art Bishop | 5,956 | 14.0 |
| Republican | Brett Savage | 1,811 | 4.2 |
| Republican | Scott Markovich | 975 | 2.3 |
| Republican | Jerry J. Laws | 814 | 1.9 |
| Republican | Robert J. "Bob" Burhle | 802 | 1.9 |
| Republican | Robert Larivee | 299 | 0.7 |
| Total votes | | 45,690 | 100.0 |
General election
| Republican | Jay Obernolte | 46,144 | 65.9 |
| Democratic | John Coffey | 23,828 | 34.1 |
| Total votes | | 69,972 | 100.0 |
| Republican hold | | | |

=== District 34 ===
California's 34th State Assembly district election, 2014
Primary election
| Party | Candidate | Votes | % |
|---|---|---|---|
| Republican | Shannon Grove (incumbent) | 37,749 | 74.6 |
| Democratic | Virginia "Mari" Goodman | 12,856 | 25.4 |
| Total votes | | 50,605 | 100.0 |
General election
| Republican | Shannon Grove (incumbent) | 70,403 | 74.3 |
| Democratic | Virginia "Mari" Goodman | 24,132 | 25.5 |
| Total votes | | 94,535 | 100.0 |
| Republican hold | | | |

=== District 35 ===
California's 35th State Assembly district election, 2014
Primary election
| Party | Candidate | Votes | % |
|---|---|---|---|
| Republican | Katcho Achadjian (incumbent) | 54,615 | 65.3 |
| Democratic | Heidi Harmon | 29,030 | 34.7 |
| Total votes | | 83,645 | 100.0 |
General election
| Republican | Katcho Achadjian (incumbent) | 77,452 | 62.7 |
| Democratic | Heidi Harmon | 46,126 | 37.3 |
| Total votes | | 123,578 | 100.0 |
| Republican hold | | | |

=== District 36 ===
California's 36th State Assembly district election, 2014
Primary election
| Party | Candidate | Votes | % |
|---|---|---|---|
| Republican | Tom Lackey | 15,095 | 41.1 |
| Democratic | Steve Fox (incumbent) | 12,055 | 32.8 |
| Republican | JD Kennedy | 4,460 | 12.2 |
| Republican | Suzette M. Martinez | 3,390 | 9.2 |
| Democratic | Kermit F. Franklin | 1,706 | 4.6 |
| Total votes | | 36,706 | 100.0 |
General election
| Republican | Tom Lackey | 42,107 | 60.2 |
| Democratic | Steve Fox (incumbent) | 27,866 | 39.8 |
| Total votes | | 69,973 | 100.0 |
| Republican gain from Democratic | | | |

=== District 37 ===
California's 37th State Assembly district election, 2014
Primary election
| Party | Candidate | Votes | % |
|---|---|---|---|
| Democratic | Das Williams (incumbent) | 43,124 | 57.3 |
| Republican | Ron DeBlauw | 32,110 | 42.7 |
| Total votes | | 75,234 | 100.0 |
General election
| Democratic | Das Williams (incumbent) | 75,452 | 58.6 |
| Republican | Ron DeBlauw | 53,414 | 41.4 |
| Total votes | | 128,866 | 100.0 |
| Democratic hold | | | |

=== District 38 ===
California's 38th State Assembly district election, 2014
Primary election
| Party | Candidate | Votes | % |
|---|---|---|---|
| Republican | Scott Wilk (incumbent) | 32,550 | 66.9 |
| Democratic | Jorge Salomon Fuentes | 16,082 | 33.1 |
| Total votes | | 48,632 | 100.0 |
General election
| Republican | Scott Wilk (incumbent) | 63,249 | 66.3 |
| Democratic | Jorge Salomon Fuentes | 32,095 | 33.7 |
| Total votes | | 95,344 | 100.0 |
| Republican hold | | | |

=== District 39 ===
California's 39th State Assembly district election, 2014
Primary election
| Party | Candidate | Votes | % |
|---|---|---|---|
| Democratic | Raul Bocanegra (incumbent) | 13,069 | 62.5 |
| Democratic | Patty Lopez | 4,940 | 23.6 |
| Democratic | Kevin J. Suscavage | 2,876 | 13.7 |
| Republican | Michael B. Boyd (write-in) | 36 | 0.2 |
| Total votes | | 20,921 | 100.0 |
General election
| Democratic | Patty Lopez | 22,750 | 50.5 |
| Democratic | Raul Bocanegra (incumbent) | 22,284 | 49.5 |
| Total votes | | 45,034 | 100.0 |
| Democratic hold | | | |

=== District 40 ===
California's 40th State Assembly district election, 2014
Primary election
| Party | Candidate | Votes | % |
|---|---|---|---|
| Republican | Marc Steinorth | 20,292 | 53.9 |
| Democratic | Kathleen Henry | 6,416 | 17.1 |
| Democratic | Melissa O'Donnell | 5,835 | 15.5 |
| Democratic | Arthur Bustamonte | 5,085 | 13.5 |
| Total votes | | 37,628 | 100.0 |
General election
| Republican | Marc Steinorth | 39,303 | 55.7 |
| Democratic | Kathleen Henry | 31,309 | 44.3 |
| Total votes | | 70,612 | 100.0 |
| Republican hold | | | |

=== District 41 ===
California's 41st State Assembly district election, 2014
Primary election
| Party | Candidate | Votes | % |
|---|---|---|---|
| Democratic | Chris Holden (incumbent) | 35,296 | 98.1 |
| Republican | Nathaniel Tsai (write-in) | 394 | 1.1 |
| Republican | Samuel S. Forsen (write-in) | 120 | 0.3 |
| Libertarian | Ted Brown (write-in) | 84 | 0.2 |
| Republican | Linda Hazelton (write-in) | 83 | 0.2 |
| Total votes | | 35,977 | 100.0 |
General election
| Democratic | Chris Holden (incumbent) | 62,810 | 59.3 |
| Republican | Nathaniel Tsai | 43,126 | 40.7 |
| Total votes | | 105,936 | 100.0 |
| Democratic hold | | | |

=== District 42 ===
California's 42nd State Assembly district election, 2014
Primary election
| Party | Candidate | Votes | % |
|---|---|---|---|
| Democratic | Karalee Hargrove | 22,973 | 37.8 |
| Republican | Chad Mayes | 20,921 | 34.4 |
| Republican | Gary Jeandron | 16,877 | 27.8 |
| Total votes | | 60,771 | 100.0 |
General election
| Republican | Chad Mayes | 56,517 | 57.3 |
| Democratic | Karalee Hargrove | 42,082 | 42.7 |
| Total votes | | 98,599 | 100.0 |
| Republican hold | | | |

=== District 43 ===
California's 43rd State Assembly district election, 2014
Primary election
| Party | Candidate | Votes | % |
|---|---|---|---|
| Democratic | Mike Gatto (incumbent) | 28,354 | 67.0 |
| Republican | Todd Royal | 13,985 | 33.0 |
| Total votes | | 42,339 | 100.0 |
General election
| Democratic | Mike Gatto (incumbent) | 51,971 | 66.5 |
| Republican | Todd Royal | 26,192 | 33.5 |
| Total votes | | 78,163 | 100.0 |
| Democratic hold | | | |

=== District 44 ===
California's 44th State Assembly district election, 2014
Primary election
| Party | Candidate | Votes | % |
|---|---|---|---|
| Democratic | Jacqui Irwin | 24,225 | 44.7 |
| Republican | Rob McCoy | 16,811 | 31.0 |
| Republican | Mario de la Piedra | 13,116 | 24.2 |
| Total votes | | 54,152 | 100.0 |
General election
| Democratic | Jacqui Irwin | 57,098 | 52.3 |
| Republican | Rob McCoy | 52,085 | 47.7 |
| Total votes | | 109,183 | 100.0 |
| Democratic gain from Republican | | | |

=== District 45 ===
California's 45th State Assembly district election, 2014
Primary election
| Party | Candidate | Votes | % |
|---|---|---|---|
| Democratic | Matt Dababneh (incumbent) | 23,208 | 54.7 |
| Republican | Susan Shelley | 19,227 | 45.3 |
| Total votes | | 42,435 | 100.0 |
General election
| Democratic | Matt Dababneh (incumbent) | 45,321 | 57.1 |
| Republican | Susan Shelley | 34,055 | 42.9 |
| Total votes | | 79,376 | 100.0 |
| Democratic hold | | | |

=== District 46 ===
California's 46th State Assembly district election, 2014
Primary election
| Party | Candidate | Votes | % |
|---|---|---|---|
| Democratic | Adrin Nazarian (incumbent) | 22,406 | 70.3 |
| Republican | Zachary Taylor | 9,481 | 29.7 |
| Total votes | | 31,887 | 100.0 |
General election
| Democratic | Adrin Nazarian (incumbent) | 45,839 | 71.6 |
| Republican | Zachary Taylor | 18,164 | 28.4 |
| Total votes | | 64,003 | 100.0 |
| Democratic hold | | | |

=== District 47 ===
California's 47th State Assembly district election, 2014
Primary election
| Party | Candidate | Votes | % |
|---|---|---|---|
| Democratic | Cheryl Brown (incumbent) | 12,643 | 68.3 |
| Democratic | Gil Navarro | 5,854 | 31.6 |
| Republican | Kelly J. Chastain (write-in) | 32 | 0.2 |
| Total votes | | 18,529 | 100.0 |
General election
| Democratic | Cheryl Brown (incumbent) | 23,632 | 56.9 |
| Democratic | Gil Navarro | 17,875 | 43.1 |
| Total votes | | 41,507 | 100.0 |
| Democratic hold | | | |

=== District 48 ===
California's 48th State Assembly district election, 2014
Primary election
| Party | Candidate | Votes | % |
|---|---|---|---|
| Democratic | Roger Hernandez (incumbent) | 13,254 | 48.5 |
| Republican | Joe Gardner | 11,187 | 40.9 |
| No party preference | Mike Meza | 2,878 | 10.5 |
| Total votes | | 27,319 | 100.0 |
General election
| Democratic | Roger Hernandez (incumbent) | 30,131 | 54.4 |
| Republican | Joe Gardner | 25,284 | 45.6 |
| Total votes | | 55,415 | 100.0 |
| Democratic hold | | | |

=== District 49 ===
California's 49th State Assembly district election, 2014
Primary election
| Party | Candidate | Votes | % |
|---|---|---|---|
| Democratic | Ed Chau (incumbent) | 17,540 | 60.2 |
| Republican | Esthela Torres Siegrist | 11,576 | 39.8 |
| Total votes | | 29,116 | 100.0 |
General election
| Democratic | Ed Chau (incumbent) | 33,030 | 61.5 |
| Republican | Esthela Torres Siegrist | 20,678 | 38.5 |
| Total votes | | 53,708 | 100.0 |
| Democratic hold | | | |

=== District 50 ===
California's 50th State Assembly district election, 2014
Primary election
| Party | Candidate | Votes | % |
|---|---|---|---|
| Democratic | Richard Bloom (incumbent) | 42,322 | 73.4 |
| Republican | Bradley S. Torgan | 15,370 | 26.6 |
| Total votes | | 57,692 | 100.0 |
General election
| Democratic | Richard Bloom (incumbent) | 78,093 | 71.5 |
| Republican | Bradley S. Torgan | 31,113 | 28.5 |
| Total votes | | 109,206 | 100.0 |
| Democratic hold | | | |

=== District 51 ===
California's 51st State Assembly district election, 2014
Primary election
| Party | Candidate | Votes | % |
|---|---|---|---|
| Democratic | Jimmy Gomez (incumbent) | 20,621 | 99.7 |
| Republican | Stephen C. Smith (write-in) | 54 | 0.3 |
| Total votes | | 20,675 | 100.0 |
General election
| Democratic | Jimmy Gomez (incumbent) | 42,261 | 83.6 |
| Republican | Stephen C. Smith | 8,277 | 16.4 |
| Total votes | | 50,538 | 100.0 |
| Democratic hold | | | |

=== District 52 ===
California's 52nd State Assembly district election, 2014
Primary election
| Party | Candidate | Votes | % |
|---|---|---|---|
| Democratic | Freddie Rodriguez (incumbent) | 11,543 | 55.2 |
| Republican | Dorothy F. Pineda | 9,368 | 44.8 |
| Total votes | | 20,911 | 100.0 |
General election
| Democratic | Freddie Rodriguez (incumbent) | 27,877 | 58.9 |
| Republican | Dorothy F. Pineda | 19,470 | 41.1 |
| Total votes | | 47,347 | 100.0 |
| Democratic hold | | | |

=== District 53 ===
California's 53rd State Assembly district election, 2014
Primary election
| Party | Candidate | Votes | % |
|---|---|---|---|
| Democratic | Miguel Santiago | 9,387 | 56.1 |
| Democratic | Sandra Mendoza | 3,953 | 23.6 |
| Democratic | Michelle "Hope" Walker | 1,964 | 11.7 |
| Democratic | Michael "Mike" Aldapa | 1,423 | 8.5 |
| Total votes | | 16,727 | 100.0 |
General election
| Democratic | Miguel Santiago | 20,472 | 63.5 |
| Democratic | Sandra Mendoza | 11,753 | 36.5 |
| Total votes | | 32,225 | 100.0 |
| Democratic hold | | | |

=== District 54 ===
California's 54th State Assembly district election, 2014
Primary election
| Party | Candidate | Votes | % |
|---|---|---|---|
| Democratic | Sebastian Ridley-Thomas (incumbent) | 34,444 | 78.2 |
| Republican | Glen Ratcliff | 9,585 | 21.8 |
| Total votes | | 44,029 | 100.0 |
General election
| Democratic | Sebastian Ridley-Thomas (incumbent) | 66,082 | 79.1 |
| Republican | Glen Ratcliff | 17,506 | 20.9 |
| Total votes | | 83,588 | 100.0 |
| Democratic hold | | | |

=== District 55 ===
California's 55th State Assembly district election, 2014
Primary election
| Party | Candidate | Votes | % |
|---|---|---|---|
| Republican | Ling Ling Chang | 13,242 | 28.7 |
| Democratic | Gregg D. Fritchle | 12,243 | 26.5 |
| Republican | Phillip Chen | 10,659 | 23.1 |
| Republican | Steve Tye | 9,987 | 21.6 |
| Total votes | | 46,131 | 100.0 |
General election
| Republican | Ling Ling Chang | 54,313 | 63.7 |
| Democratic | Gregg D. Fritchle | 30,895 | 36.3 |
| Total votes | | 85,208 | 100.0 |
| Republican hold | | | |

=== District 56 ===
California's 56th State Assembly district election, 2014
Primary election
| Party | Candidate | Votes | % |
|---|---|---|---|
| Democratic | Eduardo Garcia | 23,104 | 56.9 |
| Republican | Charles Bennet, Jr. | 17,471 | 43.1 |
| Total votes | | 40,575 | 100.0 |
General election
| Democratic | Eduardo Garcia | 35,671 | 58.5 |
| Republican | Charles Bennet, Jr. | 25,347 | 41.5 |
| Total votes | | 61,018 | 100.0 |
| Democratic hold | | | |

=== District 57 ===
California's 57th State Assembly district election, 2014
Primary election
| Party | Candidate | Votes | % |
|---|---|---|---|
| Republican | Rita Topalian | 15,859 | 52.2 |
| Democratic | Ian Calderon (incumbent) | 14,544 | 47.8 |
| Total votes | | 30,403 | 100.0 |
General election
| Democratic | Ian Calderon (incumbent) | 32,284 | 51.5 |
| Republican | Rita Topalian | 30,397 | 48.5 |
| Total votes | | 62,681 | 100.0 |

=== District 58 ===
California's 58th State Assembly district election, 2014
Primary election
| Party | Candidate | Votes | % |
|---|---|---|---|
| Democratic | Cristina Garcia (incumbent) | 19,392 | 100.0 |
| Total votes | | 19,392 | 100.0 |
General election
| Democratic | Cristina Garcia (incumbent) | 43,182 | 100.0 |
| Total votes | | 43,182 | 100.0 |
| Democratic hold | | | |

=== District 59 ===
California's 59th State Assembly district election, 2014
Primary election
| Party | Candidate | Votes | % |
|---|---|---|---|
| Democratic | Reggie Jones-Sawyer (incumbent) | 12,404 | 100.0 |
| Total votes | | 12,404 | 100.0 |
General election
| Democratic | Reggie Jones-Sawyer (incumbent) | 28,493 | 100.0 |
| Total votes | | 28,493 | 100.0 |
| Democratic hold | | | |

=== District 60 ===
California's 60th State Assembly district election, 2014
Primary election
| Party | Candidate | Votes | % |
|---|---|---|---|
| Republican | Eric Linder (incumbent) | 20,248 | 98.6 |
| Democratic | Ken Park (write-in) | 144 | 0.7 |
| Democratic | Oliver Unaka (write-in) | 118 | 0.6 |
| Libertarian | John Farr (write-in) | 34 | 0.2 |
| Total votes | | 20,544 | 100.0 |
General election
| Republican | Eric Linder (incumbent) | 34,348 | 61.5 |
| Democratic | Ken Park | 21,508 | 38.5 |
| Total votes | | 55,855 | 100.0 |
| Republican hold | | | |

=== District 61 ===
California's 61st State Assembly district election, 2014
Primary election
| Party | Candidate | Votes | % |
|---|---|---|---|
| Democratic | Jose Medina (incumbent) | 13,631 | 43.8 |
| Republican | Rudy Aranda | 12,942 | 41.6 |
| Democratic | D. Shelly Yarbrough | 4,549 | 14.6 |
| Total votes | | 31,122 | 100.0 |
General election
| Democratic | Jose Medina (incumbent) | 34,160 | 58.8 |
| Republican | Rudy Aranda | 23,973 | 41.2 |
| Total votes | | 58,033 | 100.0 |
| Democratic hold | | | |

=== District 62 ===
California's 62nd State Assembly district election, 2014
Primary election
| Party | Candidate | Votes | % |
|---|---|---|---|
| Democratic | Autumn Burke | 14,933 | 40.9 |
| Republican | Ted J. Grose | 7,357 | 20.1 |
| Democratic | Gloria Gray | 6,048 | 16.5 |
| Democratic | Simona A. Farrise | 4,624 | 12.7 |
| Democratic | Paul Kouri | 1,091 | 3.0 |
| Democratic | Mike Stevens | 939 | 2.6 |
| No party preference | Emidio "Mimi" Soltysik | 922 | 2.5 |
| Democratic | Adam M. Plimpton | 635 | 1.7 |
| Total votes | | 36,549 | 100.0 |
General election
| Democratic | Autumn Burke | 54,304 | 75.9 |
| Republican | Ted J. Grose | 17,261 | 24.1 |
| Total votes | | 71,565 | 100.0 |
| Democratic hold | | | |

=== District 63 ===
California's 63rd State Assembly district election, 2014
Primary election
| Party | Candidate | Votes | % |
|---|---|---|---|
| Democratic | Anthony Rendon (incumbent) | 12,089 | 64.7 |
| Republican | Adam J. Miller | 6,597 | 35.3 |
| Total votes | | 18,686 | 100.0 |
General election
| Democratic | Anthony Rendon (incumbent) | 28,544 | 69.1 |
| Republican | Adam J. Miller | 12,781 | 30.9 |
| Total votes | | 41,325 | 100.0 |
| Democratic hold | | | |

=== District 64 ===
California's 64th State Assembly district election, 2014
Primary election
| Party | Candidate | Votes | % |
|---|---|---|---|
| Democratic | Mike Gipson | 11,975 | 51.0 |
| Democratic | Prophet La'Omar Walker | 5,022 | 21.4 |
| Democratic | Steve Neal | 3,580 | 15.2 |
| Democratic | Micah Ali | 2,923 | 12.4 |
| Total votes | | 23,500 | 100.0 |
General election
| Democratic | Mike Gipson | 30,041 | 63.6 |
| Democratic | Prophet La'Omar Walker | 17,217 | 36.4 |
| Total votes | | 47,258 | 100.0 |
| Democratic hold | | | |

=== District 65 ===
California's 65th State Assembly district election, 2014
Primary election
| Party | Candidate | Votes | % |
|---|---|---|---|
| Republican | Young Kim | 21,593 | 54.7 |
| Democratic | Sharon Quirk-Silva (incumbent) | 17,896 | 45.3 |
| Total votes | | 39,489 | 100.0 |
General election
| Republican | Young Kim | 42,376 | 54.6 |
| Democratic | Sharon Quirk-Silva (incumbent) | 35,204 | 45.4 |
| Total votes | | 77,580 | 100.0 |
| Republican gain from Democratic | | | |

=== District 66 ===
California's 66th State Assembly district election, 2014
Primary election
| Party | Candidate | Votes | % |
|---|---|---|---|
| Republican | David Hadley | 30,996 | 50.5 |
| Democratic | Al Muratsuchi (incumbent) | 30,439 | 49.5 |
| Total votes | | 61,435 | 100.0 |
General election
| Republican | David Hadley | 54,401 | 50.3 |
| Democratic | Al Muratsuchi (incumbent) | 53,695 | 49.7 |
| Total votes | | 108,096 | 100.0 |
| Republican gain from Democratic | | | |

=== District 67 ===
California's 67th State Assembly district election, 2014
Primary election
| Party | Candidate | Votes | % |
|---|---|---|---|
| Republican | Melissa Melendez (incumbent) | 32,268 | 99.8 |
| Democratic | Conrad Melton (write-in) | 58 | 0.2 |
| Total votes | | 32,326 | 100.0 |
General election
| Republican | Melissa Melendez (incumbent) | 54,018 | 68.9 |
| Democratic | Conrad Melton | 24,386 | 31.1 |
| Total votes | | 78,404 | 100.0 |
| Republican hold | | | |

=== District 68 ===
California's 68th State Assembly district election, 2014
Primary election
| Party | Candidate | Votes | % |
|---|---|---|---|
| Republican | Donald P. Wagner (incumbent) | 35,223 | 69.7 |
| Democratic | Anne Cameron | 15,297 | 30.3 |
| Total votes | | 50,520 | 100.0 |
General election
| Republican | Donald P. Wagner (incumbent) | 66,445 | 68.4 |
| Democratic | Anne Cameron | 30,749 | 31.6 |
| Total votes | | 97,194 | 100.0 |
| Republican hold | | | |

=== District 69 ===
California's 69th State Assembly district election, 2014
Primary election
| Party | Candidate | Votes | % |
|---|---|---|---|
| Democratic | Tom Daly (incumbent) | 11,804 | 55.2 |
| Republican | Sherry Walker | 5,072 | 23.7 |
| Republican | Cecilia "Ceci" Iglesias | 4,489 | 21.0 |
| Total votes | | 21,365 | 100.0 |
General election
| Democratic | Tom Daly (incumbent) | 32,332 | 67.4 |
| Republican | Sherry Walker | 15,665 | 32.6 |
| Total votes | | 47,997 | 100.0 |
| Democratic hold | | | |

=== District 70 ===
California's 70th State Assembly district election, 2014
Primary election
| Party | Candidate | Votes | % |
|---|---|---|---|
| Democratic | Patrick O'Donnell | 21,949 | 40.6 |
| Republican | John C. Goya | 17,367 | 32.2 |
| Democratic | Suja Lowenthal | 14,697 | 27.2 |
| Total votes | | 54,013 | 100.0 |
General election
| Democratic | Patrick O'Donnell | 48,978 | 63.8 |
| Republican | John C. Goya | 27,755 | 36.2 |
| Total votes | | 76,733 | 100.0 |
| Democratic hold | | | |

=== District 71 ===
California's 71st State Assembly district election, 2014
Primary election
| Party | Candidate | Votes | % |
|---|---|---|---|
| Republican | Brian Jones (incumbent) | 40,326 | 76.1 |
| Republican | Tony Teora | 12,573 | 23.7 |
| Democratic | Howard L. Katz (write-in) | 109 | 0.2 |
| Total votes | | 53,008 | 100.0 |
General election
| Republican | Brian Jones (incumbent) | 64,613 | 70.6 |
| Republican | Tony Teora | 26,935 | 29.4 |
| Total votes | | 91,548 | 100.0 |
| Republican hold | | | |

=== District 72 ===
California's 72nd State Assembly district election, 2014
Primary election
| Party | Candidate | Votes | % |
|---|---|---|---|
| Republican | Travis Allen (incumbent) | 36,677 | 65.5 |
| Democratic | Joel Block | 11,556 | 20.6 |
| Democratic | Albert Ayala | 7,733 | 13.8 |
| Total votes | | 55,966 | 100.0 |
General election
| Republican | Travis Allen (incumbent) | 66,150 | 65.5 |
| Democratic | Joel Block | 34,793 | 34.5 |
| Total votes | | 100,943 | 100.0 |
| Republican hold | | | |

=== District 73 ===
California's 73rd State Assembly district election, 2014
Primary election
| Party | Candidate | Votes | % |
|---|---|---|---|
| Democratic | Wendy Gabriella | 16,420 | 27.8 |
| Republican | Bill Brough | 16,365 | 27.7 |
| Republican | Jesse Petrilla | 11,287 | 19.1 |
| Republican | Paul G. Glabb | 8,353 | 14.2 |
| Republican | Anna Bryson | 6,549 | 11.1 |
| Total votes | | 58,974 | 100.0 |
General election
| Republican | Bill Brough | 76,783 | 67.9 |
| Democratic | Wendy Gabriella | 36,292 | 32.1 |
| Total votes | | 113,075 | 100.0 |
| Republican hold | | | |

=== District 74 ===
California's 74th State Assembly district election, 2014
Primary election
| Party | Candidate | Votes | % |
|---|---|---|---|
| Republican | Keith Curry | 17,013 | 27.6 |
| Republican | Matthew Harper | 15,309 | 24.9 |
| Democratic | Anila Ali | 11,978 | 19.5 |
| Democratic | Karina Onofre | 9,310 | 15.1 |
| Republican | Emanuel Patrascu | 7,933 | 12.9 |
| Total votes | | 61,543 | 100.0 |
General election
| Republican | Matthew Harper | 60,070 | 59.5 |
| Republican | Keith Curry | 40,896 | 40.5 |
| Total votes | | 100,966 | 100.0 |
| Republican hold | | | |

=== District 75 ===
California's 75th State Assembly district election, 2014
Primary election
| Party | Candidate | Votes | % |
|---|---|---|---|
| Republican | Marie Waldron (incumbent) | 41,510 | 99.1 |
| Democratic | Nicholas Shestople (write-in) | 375 | 0.9 |
| Libertarian | Mike Paster (write-in) | 14 | 0.0 |
| Total votes | | 41,899 | 100.0 |
General election
| Republican | Marie Waldron (incumbent) | 66,152 | 69.0 |
| Democratic | Nicholas Shestople | 29,761 | 31.0 |
| Total votes | | 95,913 | 100.0 |
| Republican hold | | | |

=== District 76 ===
California's 76th State Assembly district election, 2014
Primary election
| Party | Candidate | Votes | % |
|---|---|---|---|
| Republican | Rocky Chavez (incumbent) | 40,764 | 99.9 |
| Republican | Thomas Krouse (write-in) | 28 | 0.1 |
| Total votes | | 40,792 | 100.0 |
General election
| Republican | Rocky Chavez (incumbent) | 58,824 | 66.9 |
| Republican | Thomas Krouse | 29,065 | 33.1 |
| Total votes | | 87,889 | 100.0 |
| Republican hold | | | |

=== District 77 ===
California's 77th State Assembly district election, 2014
Primary election
| Party | Candidate | Votes | % |
|---|---|---|---|
| Republican | Brian Maienschein (incumbent) | 57,147 | 70.6 |
| Democratic | Ruben "RJ" Hernandez | 23,821 | 29.4 |
| Total votes | | 80,968 | 100.0 |
General election
| Republican | Brian Maienschein (incumbent) | 82,987 | 65.8 |
| Democratic | Ruben "RJ" Hernandez | 43,038 | 34.2 |
| Total votes | | 126,025 | 100.0 |
| Republican hold | | | |

=== District 78 ===
California's 78th State Assembly district election, 2014
Primary election
| Party | Candidate | Votes | % |
|---|---|---|---|
| Democratic | Toni Atkins (incumbent) | 45,922 | 60.2 |
| Republican | Barbara Decker | 21,545 | 28.2 |
| Republican | Kevin D. Melton | 8,855 | 11.6 |
| Total votes | | 76,322 | 100.0 |
General election
| Democratic | Toni Atkins (incumbent) | 72,224 | 61.6 |
| Republican | Barbara Decker | 45,088 | 38.4 |
| Total votes | | 117,312 | 100.0 |
| Democratic hold | | | |

=== District 79 ===
California's 79th State Assembly district election, 2014
Primary election
| Party | Candidate | Votes | % |
|---|---|---|---|
| Democratic | Shirley Weber (incumbent) | 35,886 | 99.7 |
| American Independent | George R. Williams (write-in) | 115 | 0.3 |
| Total votes | | 36,001 | 100.0 |
General election
| Democratic | Shirley Weber (incumbent) | 49,264 | 61.9 |
| American Independent | George R. Williams | 30,266 | 38.1 |
| Total votes | | 79,530 | 100.0 |
| Democratic hold | | | |

=== District 80 ===
California's 80th State Assembly district election, 2014
Primary election
| Party | Candidate | Votes | % |
|---|---|---|---|
| Democratic | Lorena Gonzalez (incumbent) | 25,953 | 100.0 |
| Total votes | | 25,953 | 100.0 |
General election
| Democratic | Lorena Gonzalez (incumbent) | 43,362 | 100.0 |
| Total votes | | 43,362 | 100.0 |
| Democratic hold | | | |
