= California's 35th district =

California's 35th district may refer to:

- California's 35th congressional district
- California's 35th State Assembly district
- California's 35th State Senate district
