= Das Williams =

American politician (born 1974)

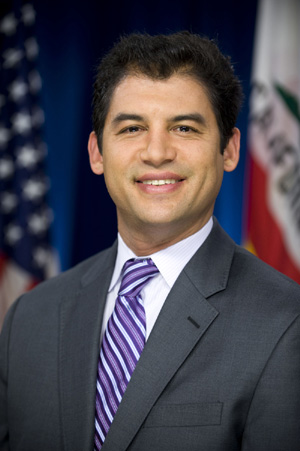

Former Member of the Santa Barbara County Board of Supervisors from the 1st District
- In office January 2, 2017 – 2025
- Preceded by: Salud Carbajal
- Succeeded by: Roy Lee (elect)

Member of the California State Assembly from the 37th district 35th district (2010–2012)
- In office December 6, 2010 – November 30, 2016
- Preceded by: Pedro Nava
- Succeeded by: Monique Limón

Santa Barbara City Councilmember
- In office December 4, 2002 – December 6, 2010

Personal details
- Born: Dohassen Gault-Williams; June 29, 1974 (age 52) Soldotna, Alaska, U.S.
- Party: Democratic
- Spouse: Jonnie Erika Williams
- Children: 2
- Education: University of California, Santa Barbara
- Profession: Community organizer

Dohassen Gault-Williams (born June 29, 1974), better known as Das Williams, is an American politician who previously served as County Supervisor on the Santa Barbara County Board of Supervisors. He represented the First District, which encompasses Carpinteria, most of Santa Barbara, and parts of the Los Padres National Forest. In 2024, Williams was defeated for re-election in a bid for his second term by Carpinteria City Councilman Roy Lee by a 49%-51% margin.

He formerly served in the California State Assembly, representing the 37th district, encompassing parts of Santa Barbara and Ventura counties. Before being elected to the state assembly, he was a member of the Santa Barbara City Council. He is a Democrat.

== Background ==
Williams is of Indonesian descent through his maternal grandfather.

Before embarking in politics, Williams worked as a junior high school teacher and a legislative aide to then-assemblymember Hannah-Beth Jackson.

Williams holds a master's degree in Environmental Science & Management, with a focus on water pollution, planning processes, and land-use law from the University of California, Santa Barbara's Bren School of Environmental Science & Management in 2005. As a UC grad, Williams has opposed fee increases for the UC system.

Williams got his start in politics as a member of the Santa Barbara City Council while still in graduate school, serving from 2003 until 2010.

In the State Assembly, Das led the effort to pass a new gun control measure after the 2014 Isla Vista shootings; similar policies have since been adopted nationwide. After the Thomas Fire and Montecito Debris Flow, Das was instrumental in passing ordinances that allowed homeowners to rebuild their lost property quickly.

After terming out of the State Assembly in 2016, Williams successfully ran for Santa Barbara County Board of Supervisors, where he served from 2017 until 2024.

== 2014 California State Assembly ==
California's 37th State Assembly district election, 2014
Primary election
Party	Candidate	Votes	%
Democratic	Das Williams (incumbent)	43,124	57.3
Republican	Ron DeBlauw	32,110	42.7
Total votes		75,234	100.0
General election
Democratic	Das Williams (incumbent)	75,452	58.6
Republican	Ron DeBlauw	53,414	41.4
Total votes		128,866	100.0
Democratic hold			
