= Katcho Achadjian =

American politician (1951–2020)

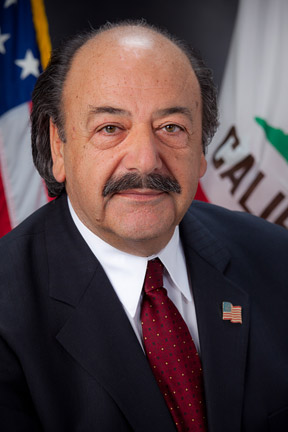

Member of the California State Assembly from the 35th district 33rd district (2010–2012)
- In office December 6, 2010 – November 30, 2016
- Preceded by: Sam Blakeslee
- Succeeded by: Jordan Cunningham

Member of the San Luis Obispo County Board of Supervisors from the 4th District
- In office December 7, 1998 – December 6, 2010
- Succeeded by: Paul Teixeira

Personal details
- Born: Khatchik Hratchia Achadjian; June 2, 1951 Jalala, Lebanon
- Died: March 5, 2020 (aged 68) San Luis Obispo, California, U.S.
- Party: Republican
- Spouse: Araxie Achadjian
- Children: 2
- Education: Cal Poly San Luis Obispo
- Profession: Business Owner, Politician

Khatchik Hratchia Achadjian (June 2, 1951 – March 5, 2020) was an American businessman and politician who formerly served in the California State Assembly. He was a Republican who represented the 35th district, encompassing San Luis Obispo County and part of Santa Barbara County. He previously represented the 33rd district, and prior to being elected to the State Assembly, was also a member of the San Luis Obispo County Board of Supervisors. In 2016, he ran for the United States House of Representatives from the 24th district, but he was defeated in the primary election.

== Early life, education, and Board of Supervisors ==
Achadjian was born in Jalala, near Chtaura in Lebanon, to Armenian parents, immigrating to the United States in 1971 and becoming a United States citizen in 1982. He first attended the Armenian Evangelical Elementary School in Jalala and, later, secondary school in Anjar. Afterwards, he studied in Cuesta College before graduating from Cal Poly with a Business Administration degree. He and his wife Araxie were married in 1984. In 1978, he purchased a small business that expanded into multiple stores and gas stations throughout San Luis Obispo County.

Achadjian was first elected to the San Luis Obispo County Board of Supervisors in 1998, serving until his election to the assembly in 2010. He served as chairman of the board in 2001 and 2006.

== California Assembly ==
In 2010, Achadjian first ran as the Republican nominee for the California State Assembly, in the 33rd district. He won 58% of the popular vote against Democrat Hilda Zacarias.

By 2012, the district was redrawn into the 35th district. In the primary, Achadjian won 65% of the vote against Democrat Gerald Manata's 35%. In the general election, Achadjian won 61% to Manata's 39%.

Achadjian ran for a third term in 2014, winning 65% of the vote yet again in the primary, against the 35% of Democrat Heidi Harmon. In the general, Achadjian increased his performance slightly over his 2012 result, with 63% of the vote to Harman's 37%.

Throughout his time in the Assembly, Achadjian's voting record received perfect scores from such groups as the California Chamber of Commerce, the California Taxpayers Association, the National Federation of Independent Business, and the California Small Business Association.

=== Committee assignments ===
- Assembly Committee on Banking and Finance
- Assembly Committee on Jobs, Economic Development, and the Economy
- Assembly Committee on Veterans Affairs
- Assembly Joint Committee on Fairs, Allocations, and Classification
- Assembly Joint Committee on Fisheries and Antiquities
- Assembly Joint Legislative Audit

== 2016 congressional bid ==
In 2015, Achadjian announced his intention to run for the United States House of Representatives, from California's 24th congressional district, in the 2016 elections. The district's longtime incumbent, Democrat Lois Capps, had previously announced that she would not seek reelection. As a result, the field was significantly larger than in the past; Achadjian's competition included two other Republicans (both of whom, Justin Fareed and Matt Kokkonen, are former candidates for the same district in previous years), two independent candidates (including another former candidate, Steve Isakson), and four Democrats (including Santa Barbara Mayor Helene Schneider and Santa Barbara County Supervisor Salud Carbajal). Achadjian received endorsements from many prominent Republicans in the region, including Santa Barbara City Councilmen Frank Hotchkiss and Dale Francisco (the latter of whom was also Santa Barbara County Republican chair, and had previously run for the same district in 2014), and former actor Christopher Mitchum, the previous Republican nominee for the seat who lost to Capps in 2014.

In the lead-up to the primary on June 7, Achadjian raised roughly $750,000 in the congressional race. Although he was only the fourth-highest fundraiser in the race, he was generally considered to be the primary frontrunner due to arguably having more name recognition among voters than any other candidate, from either party. Polls released both by his own campaign and the Schneider campaign predicted that Achadjian would come in first in the open primary. However, despite this, he came in a narrow third with 27,545 (18.9%) total votes, only 1.6% behind Justin Fareed, who finished a distant second to Carbajal. Fareed went on to lose the general election to Carbajal.

== Later life and death ==
Katcho Achadjian died on March 5, 2020, at the age of 68, due to unspecified health complications.

== Electoral history ==
California's 33rd State Assembly district election, 2010
Party	Candidate	Votes	%
Republican	Katcho Achadjian	84,629	57.8
Democratic	Hilda Zacarias	54,817	37.4
Libertarian	Paul K. Polson	7,051	4.8
Total votes		146,497	100.0
Republican hold			

California's 35th State Assembly district election, 2012
Primary election
Party	Candidate	Votes	%
Republican	Katcho Achadjian (incumbent)	62,747	64.9
Democratic	Gerald "Gerry" Manata	33,862	35.1
Total votes		96,609	100.0
General election
Republican	Katcho Achadjian (incumbent)	103,762	61.3
Democratic	Gerald "Gerry" Manata	65,500	38.7
Total votes		169,262	100.0
Republican hold			

California's 35th State Assembly district election, 2014
Primary election
Party	Candidate	Votes	%
Republican	Katcho Achadjian (incumbent)	54,615	65.3
Democratic	Heidi Harmon	29,030	34.7
Total votes		83,645	100.0
General election
Republican	Katcho Achadjian (incumbent)	77,452	62.7
Democratic	Heidi Harmon	46,126	37.3
Total votes		123,578	100.0
Republican hold			

California's 24th congressional district election, 2016
Primary election
Party	Candidate	Votes	%
Democratic	Salud Carbajal	47,618	32.7
Republican	Justin Donald Fareed	29,902	20.5
Republican	Katcho Achadjian	27,545	18.9
Democratic	Helene Schneider	20,992	14.4
Democratic	William "Bill" Ostrander	8,048	5.5
Republican	Matt T. Kokkonen	7,779	5.3
No party preference	Steve Isakson	1,444	1.0
No party preference	John Uebersax	1,330	0.9
Democratic	Benjamin Lucas	1,103	0.7
Total votes		145,671	100.0
General election
Democratic	Salud Carbajal	166,034	53.4
Republican	Justin Fareed	144,780	46.6
Total votes		310,814	100.0
