= California Fair Pay Act =

2015 California law

Authored by State Senator Hannah-Beth Jackson, the California Fair Pay Act (also known as SB358) is an amendment to the existing California labor laws that protects employees who want to discuss about their co-workers' wages as well as eliminating loopholes that allowed employers to justify inequalities in pay distribution between opposite sexes. The bill is an extension of the California Equal Pay Act of 1949, which was originally intended to enforce equal pay.

== Background ==
The California Equal Pay Act of 1949 (EPA) stated that "No employer shall pay any individual in the employer's employ at wage rates less than the rates paid to employees of the opposite sex in the same establishment for equal work on jobs". Because of the vagueness of this law, employers are able to find loopholes and pay women in California much lower than their male co-workers. As of 2015, female workers make only 80 cents for every dollar earned by male workers thus putting the gender wage gap of 20%. Over 38.8 billion dollars is lost due to the wage gap between men and women. On October 6, 2015, Governor Jerry Brown signed the bill into law and the amendment took effect on January 1, 2016.

== Features ==
The new bill is set to fix many of the previous law's issues by fixing terms such as "bona fide factor other than sex", "substantially similar work" and "same establishment" that have allowed employers to justify the wage gap. Before employers would rely on irrelevant "factors other than sex" to justify the wage gap. SB358 is set to alter the term "bona fide factor other than sex" defense with actual legitimate factors. It ensures to employees who perform "substantially similar work" but are paid differently to have equal pay. It also adds onto the "same establishment" clause that stated that men and women must be paid equally in same workplace establishment but now it is that men and women must be paid equally underneath the same establishment of work but they don't have to be working under the "same establishment" as employers have been able to justify lower wages despite males doing the same job at another company getting paid more. The key feature of SB358 is that it prevents employers from discriminating against its employees who seek to discuss, disclose, or inquire about their co-workers' pay.
