= California's 24th congressional district =

U.S. House district for California

Coordinates: 34.6°N 119.7°W

- Interactive map of district boundaries
- Representative: Salud Carbajal; D–Santa Barbara
- Population (2025): 753,845
- Median household income: $100,445
- Ethnicity: 49.7% White; 38.6% Hispanic; 5.0% Asian; 4.1% Two or more races; 1.5% Black; 0.7% other
- Cook PVI: D+13

California's 24th congressional district is a congressional district in the U.S. state of California. The district is currently represented by Salud Carbajal. It contains all of Santa Barbara County, most of San Luis Obispo County, and part of Ventura County. Cities in the district include Santa Barbara, Ventura, San Luis Obispo, Santa Maria, and Ojai.

Prior to redistricting in 2011, the district covered the inland portions of Ventura and Santa Barbara counties, as well as a sparsely populated portion of the Ventura County coast. Redistricting in 2021 removed the northern part of San Luis Obispo County and added the cities of Ojai and Ventura.

== Recent election results from statewide races ==
=== 2023–2027 boundaries ===
Year	Office	Results
2008	President	Obama 60% - 40%
2010	Governor	Brown 49% - 45%
2010	Lt. Governor	Maldonado 47% - 44%
2010	Secretary of State	Bowen 50% - 41%
2010	Attorney General	Cooley 47% - 43%
2010	Treasurer	Lockyer 54% - 39%
2010	Controller	Chiang 51% - 42%
2012	President	Obama 58% - 42%
2014	Governor	Brown 59% - 41%
2016	President	Clinton 59% - 34%
2018	Governor	Newsom 59% - 41%
2018	Attorney General	Becerra 61% - 39%
2020	President	Biden 63% - 34%
2022	Senate (Reg.)	Padilla 61% - 39%
2022	Governor	Newsom 59% - 41%
2022	Lt. Governor	Kounalakis 60% - 40%
2022	Secretary of State	Weber 60% - 40%
2022	Attorney General	Bonta 59% - 41%
2022	Treasurer	Ma 59% - 41%
2022	Controller	Cohen 55% - 45%
2024	President	Harris 61% - 36%
2024	Senate (Reg.)	Schiff 60% - 40%

=== 2027–2033 boundaries ===
Year	Office	Results
2008	President	Obama 60% - 40%
2010	Governor	Brown 49% - 45%
2010	Lt. Governor	Newsom 47% - 44%
2010	Secretary of State	Bowen 50% - 41%
2010	Attorney General	Harris 47% - 43%
2010	Treasurer	Lockyer 54% - 39%
2010	Controller	Chiang 51% - 42%
2012	President	Obama 58% - 42%
2014	Governor	Brown 59% - 41%
2016	President	Clinton 59% - 34%
2018	Governor	Newsom 59% - 41%
2018	Attorney General	Becerra 61% - 39%
2020	President	Biden 63% - 34%
2022	Senate (Reg.)	Padilla 61% - 39%
2022	Governor	Newsom 59% - 41%
2022	Lt. Governor	Kounalakis 60% - 40%
2022	Secretary of State	Weber 60% - 40%
2022	Attorney General	Bonta 59% - 41%
2022	Treasurer	Ma 59% - 41%
2022	Controller	Cohen 55% - 45%
2024	President	Harris 61% - 36%
2024	Senate (Reg.)	Schiff 60% - 40%

== Composition ==
FIPS County Code	County	Seat	Population
79	San Luis Obispo	San Luis Obispo	281,639
83	Santa Barbara	Santa Barbara	441,257
111	Ventura	Ventura	829,590

Under the 2020 redistricting, California's 24th congressional district is located on the southern edge of the Central Coast. It encompassing Santa Barbara County, most of San Luis Obispo County, and part of Ventura County. The district also takes in six of the Channel Islands. The area in San Luis Obispo County includes the cities of San Luis Obispo, Arroyo Grande, Morro Bay, Grover Beach, and Pismo Beach; and the census-designated places Nipomo, Los Osos, Cayucos, Garden Farms, Santa Margarita, California Polytechnic State University, Los Ranchos, Edna, Avila Beach, Oceano, Los Berros, Callender, Blacklake, and Woodlands. The area in Ventura County includes most of the city of Ventura.

San Luis Obispo County is split between this district and the 19th district. They are partitioned by Highway 1, Cayucos Creek Rd, Thunder Canyon Rd, Old Creek Rd, Santa Rita Rd, Tara Creek, Fuentes Rd, Highway 41, San Miguel Rd, Palo Verde Rd, Old Morro Rd, Los Osos Rd, San Rafael Rd, Atascadero Ave, San Antonio Rd, N Santa Margarita Rd, Santa Clara Rd, Rocky Canyon Truck Trail, Highway 229, Lion Ridge Rd, O'Donovan Rd, Highway 58, Calf Canyon Highway, La Panza Rd, Upton Canyon Rd, Camatta Creek Rd, San Juan Creek, and Bitterwater Rd.

Ventura County is split between this district and the 26th district. They are partitioned by Highway 150, Los Padres National Park, Highway 33, Cozy del, Cozy Ojai Rd, Shelf Road Trail, Gridley Rd, Grand Ave, Thatcher Creek, Boardman Rd, Sulphur Mountain Rd, Cahada Larga Rd, Highway 33, Shell Rd E, Manuel Canyon Rd, Aliso St, Willoughby Rd, Aliso Canyon Rd, Foothill Rd, N Wells Rd, Highway 126, Highway 118, Brown Barranca, Montgomery Ave, Telephone Rd, Rameli Ave, Harmon Barranca, Johnson Dr, S Victoria Ave, Highway 101, E Harbor Blvd, and Olivias Park Dr.

=== Cities and CDPs with 10,000 or more people ===
- Ventura – 110,763
- Santa Maria – 109,711
- Santa Barbara – 88,665
- San Luis Obispo – 47,063
- Lompoc – 44,444
- Goleta – 32,690
- Orcutt – 32,034
- Eastern Goleta Valley – 28,656
- Nipomo – 18,716
- Arroyo Grande – 18,441
- Isla Vista – 15,500
- Los Osos – 14,465
- Carpinteria – 13,264
- Grover Beach – 12,701
- Morro Bay – 10,757

=== 2,500 – 10,000 people ===
- University of California-Santa Barbara – 9,710
- Montecito – 8,638
- California Polytechnic State University – 8,583
- Pismo Beach – 8,072
- Guadalupe – 8,057
- Ojai – 7,637
- Vandenberg Village – 7,308
- Oceano – 7,183
- Mira Monte – 6,618
- Oak View – 6,215
- Solvang – 6,126
- Buellton – 5,161
- Santa Ynez – 4,505
- Meiners Oaks – 3,911
- Mission Hills – 3,571
- Vandenberg SBF – 3,559
- Mission Canyon – 2,540
- Cayucos – 2,505

== List of members representing the district ==
Representatives from California's 24th congressional district
Member	Party	Dates	Cong ress	Electoral history	Counties
District created January 3, 1953
Norris Poulson (Los Angeles)	Republican	January 3, 1953 – June 11, 1953	83rd	Redistricted from the 13th district and re-elected in 1952. Resigned to become Mayor of Los Angeles.	1953–1963; Los Angeles
Vacant		June 11, 1953 – November 10, 1953	83rd		1953–1963; Los Angeles
Glenard P. Lipscomb (Los Angeles)	Republican	November 10, 1953 – February 1, 1970	83rd 84th 85th 86th 87th 88th 89th 90th 91st	Elected to finish Poulson's term. Re-elected in 1954. Re-elected in 1956. Re-elected in 1958. Re-elected in 1960. Re-elected in 1962. Re-elected in 1964. Re-elected in 1966. Re-elected in 1968. Died.	1953–1963; Los Angeles
Glenard P. Lipscomb (Los Angeles)	Republican	November 10, 1953 – February 1, 1970	83rd 84th 85th 86th 87th 88th 89th 90th 91st	Elected to finish Poulson's term. Re-elected in 1954. Re-elected in 1956. Re-elected in 1958. Re-elected in 1960. Re-elected in 1962. Re-elected in 1964. Re-elected in 1966. Re-elected in 1968. Died.	1963–1973; Los Angeles, southwestern San Bernardino
Vacant		February 1, 1970 – June 30, 1970	91st		1963–1973; Los Angeles, southwestern San Bernardino
John H. Rousselot (San Marino)	Republican	June 30, 1970 – January 3, 1975	91st 92nd 93rd	Elected to finish Lipscomb's term. Re-elected later in 1970. Re-elected in 1972. Redistricted to the 26th district.	1963–1973; Los Angeles, southwestern San Bernardino
John H. Rousselot (San Marino)	Republican	June 30, 1970 – January 3, 1975	91st 92nd 93rd	Elected to finish Lipscomb's term. Re-elected later in 1970. Re-elected in 1972. Redistricted to the 26th district.	1973–1983; Los Angeles
Henry Waxman (Los Angeles)	Democratic	January 3, 1975 – January 3, 1993	94th 95th 96th 97th 98th 99th 100th 101st 102nd	Elected in 1974. Re-elected in 1976. Re-elected in 1978. Re-elected in 1980. Re-elected in 1982. Re-elected in 1984. Re-elected in 1986. Re-elected in 1988. Re-elected in 1990. Redistricted to the 29th district.	1973–1983; Los Angeles
Henry Waxman (Los Angeles)	Democratic	January 3, 1975 – January 3, 1993	94th 95th 96th 97th 98th 99th 100th 101st 102nd	Elected in 1974. Re-elected in 1976. Re-elected in 1978. Re-elected in 1980. Re-elected in 1982. Re-elected in 1984. Re-elected in 1986. Re-elected in 1988. Re-elected in 1990. Redistricted to the 29th district.	1983–1993; North central Los Angeles (Hollywood)
Anthony C. Beilenson (Los Angeles)	Democratic	January 3, 1993 – January 3, 1997	103rd 104th	Redistricted from the 23rd district and re-elected in 1992. Re-elected in 1994. Retired.	1993–2003; Southwestern Los Angeles, southeastern Ventura (Thousand Oaks)
Brad Sherman (Los Angeles)	Democratic	January 3, 1997 – January 3, 2003	105th 106th 107th	Elected in 1996. Re-elected in 1998. Re-elected in 2000. Redistricted to the 27th district.	1993–2003; Southwestern Los Angeles, southeastern Ventura (Thousand Oaks)
Elton Gallegly (Simi Valley)	Republican	January 3, 2003 – January 3, 2013	108th 109th 110th 111th 112th	Redistricted from the 23rd district and re-elected in 2002. Re-elected in 2004. Re-elected in 2006. Re-elected in 2008. Re-elected in 2010. Retired.	2003–2013 Inland Santa Barbara, most of Ventura
Lois Capps (Santa Barbara)	Democratic	January 3, 2013 – January 3, 2017	113th 114th	Redistricted from the 23rd district and re-elected in 2012. Re-elected in 2014. Retired.	2013–2023 Central Coast including San Luis Obispo and Santa Barbara
Salud Carbajal (Santa Barbara)	Democratic	January 3, 2017 – present	115th 116th 117th 118th 119th	Elected in 2016. Re-elected in 2018. Re-elected in 2020. Re-elected in 2022. Re-elected in 2024. Re-elected in 2026.	2013–2023 Central Coast including San Luis Obispo and Santa Barbara
Salud Carbajal (Santa Barbara)	Democratic	January 3, 2017 – present	115th 116th 117th 118th 119th	Elected in 2016. Re-elected in 2018. Re-elected in 2020. Re-elected in 2022. Re-elected in 2024. Re-elected in 2026.	2023–present

== Election results ==
=== 1952 ===
1952 United States House of Representatives elections in California, District 24
Party	Candidate	Votes	%
Republican	Norris Poulson (incumbent)	119,799	87.4
Progressive	Bertram L. Sharp	17,307	12.6
Total votes		137,106	100.0
Turnout			
Republican hold			

=== 1953 (Special) ===
Republican Glenard P. Lipscomb won the special election to replace fellow Republican Norris Poulson, who was elected Mayor of Los Angeles. Data for this special election is not available.

=== 1954 ===
1954 United States House of Representatives elections in California, District 24
Party	Candidate	Votes	%
Republican	Glenard P. Lipscomb (inc.)	65,431	56.9
Democratic	George Arnold	49,592	43.1
Total votes		115,023	100.0
Turnout			
Republican hold			

=== 1956 ===
1956 United States House of Representatives elections in California, District 24
Party	Candidate	Votes	%
Republican	Glenard P. Lipscomb (inc.)	84,120	61.9
Democratic	Fay Porter	51,692	38.1
Total votes		135,812	100.0
Turnout			
Republican hold			

=== 1958 ===
1958 United States House of Representatives elections in California, District 24
Party	Candidate	Votes	%
Republican	Glenard P. Lipscomb (inc.)	68,184	56.4
Democratic	William H. Ware, Jr.	52,804	43.6
Total votes		120,988	100.0
Turnout			
Republican hold			

=== 1960 ===
1960 United States House of Representatives elections in California, District 24
Party	Candidate	Votes	%
Republican	Glenard P. Lipscomb (inc.)	82,497	59.7
Democratic	Norman Hass	55,613	40.3
Total votes		138,110	100.0
Turnout			
Republican hold			

=== 1962 ===
1962 United States House of Representatives elections in California, District 24
Party	Candidate	Votes	%
Republican	Glenard P. Lipscomb (inc.)	120,884	70.3
Democratic	Knox Mellon	50,970	29.7
Total votes		171,854	100.0
Turnout			
Republican hold			

=== 1964 ===
1964 United States House of Representatives elections in California, District 24
Party	Candidate	Votes	%
Republican	Glenard P. Lipscomb (inc.)	139,784	67.9
Democratic	Bryan W. Stevens	65,967	32.1
Total votes		205,751	100.0
Turnout			
Republican hold			

=== 1966 ===
1966 United States House of Representatives elections in California, District 24
Party	Candidate	Votes	%
Republican	Glenard P. Lipscomb (inc.)	148,190	76.3
Democratic	Earl G. McNall	46,115	23.7
Total votes		194,305	100.0
Turnout			
Republican hold			

=== 1968 ===
1968 United States House of Representatives elections in California, District 24
Party	Candidate	Votes	%
Republican	Glenard P. Lipscomb (inc.)	152,180	72.8
Democratic	Fred Warner Neal	56,723	27.2
Total votes		208,903	
Republican hold			

=== 1970 (Special) ===
1970 special election
Party	Candidate	Votes	%
Republican	John H. Rousselot	62,749	68.2
Democratic	Myrlie B. Evers	29,248	31.8
Total votes		91,997	100.0
Turnout			
Republican hold			

=== 1970 ===
1970 United States House of Representatives elections in California, District 24
Party	Candidate	Votes	%
Republican	John H. Rousselot (inc.)	124,071	65.1
Democratic	Myrlie B. Evers	61,777	32.4
American Independent	Brian Scanlon	3,018	1.6
Peace and Freedom	Harold Kaplan	1,858	1.0
Total votes		190,724	100.0
Turnout			
Republican hold			

=== 1972 ===
1972 United States House of Representatives elections in California, District 24
Party	Candidate	Votes	%
Republican	John H. Rousselot (inc.)	141,274	70.1
Democratic	Luther Mandell	60,170	29.9
Total votes		201,444	
Republican hold			

=== 1974 ===
1974 United States House of Representatives elections in California, District 24
Party	Candidate	Votes	%
Democratic	Henry Waxman	85,343	64.0
Republican	Elliott Stone Graham	43,680	33.0
American Independent	David E. Davis	3,980	3.0
Total votes		133,003	100.0
Turnout			
Democratic hold			

=== 1976 ===
1976 United States House of Representatives elections in California, District 24
Party	Candidate	Votes	%
Democratic	Henry Waxman (incumbent)	108,296	67.8
Republican	David Irvins Simmons	51,478	32.2
Total votes		159,774	100.0
Turnout			
Democratic hold			

=== 1978 ===
1978 United States House of Representatives elections in California, District 24
Party	Candidate	Votes	%
Democratic	Henry Waxman (incumbent)	85,075	62.7
Republican	Howard G. Schaefer	44,243	32.6
Peace and Freedom	Kevin Casey Peters	6,453	4.8
Total votes		135,771	100.0
Turnout			
Democratic hold			

=== 1980 ===
1980 United States House of Representatives elections in California, District 24
Party	Candidate	Votes	%
Democratic	Henry Waxman (incumbent)	93,569	63.8
Republican	Roland Cayard	39,744	27.1
Peace and Freedom	Margaret "Maggie" Feigin	5,905	4.0
Libertarian	Robert E. Lehman	5,172	3.5
American Independent	Jack Smilowitz	2,341	1.6
Total votes		146,731	100.0
Turnout			
Democratic hold			

=== 1982 ===
1982 United States House of Representatives elections in California, District 24
Party	Candidate	Votes	%
Democratic	Henry Waxman (incumbent)	88,516	65.1
Republican	Jerry Zerg	42,133	31.0
Libertarian	Jeff Mandel	5,420	1.8
Total votes		136,069	100.0
Turnout			
Democratic hold			

=== 1984 ===
1984 United States House of Representatives elections in California, District 24
Party	Candidate	Votes	%
Democratic	Henry Waxman (incumbent)	97,340	63.4
Republican	Jerry Zerg	51,010	33.2
Peace and Freedom	James Green	2,780	1.8
Libertarian	Tim Custer	2,477	1.6
Total votes		153,607	100.0
Turnout			
Democratic hold			

=== 1986 ===
1986 United States House of Representatives elections in California, District 24
Party	Candidate	Votes	%
Democratic	Henry Waxman (incumbent)	103,914	87.9
Libertarian	George Abrahams	8,871	7.5
Peace and Freedom	James Green	5,388	4.6
Total votes		118,173	100.0
Turnout			
Democratic hold			

=== 1988 ===
1988 United States House of Representatives elections in California, District 24
Party	Candidate	Votes	%
Democratic	Henry Waxman (incumbent)	112,038	72.2
Republican	John N. Cowles	36,835	23.8
Peace and Freedom	James Green	3,571	2.3
Libertarian	George Abrahams	2,627	1.7
Total votes		155,071	100.0
Turnout			
Democratic hold			

=== 1990 ===
1990 United States House of Representatives elections in California, District 24
Party	Candidate	Votes	%
Democratic	Henry Waxman (incumbent)	71,562	68.9
Republican	John N. Cowles	26,607	25.6
Peace and Freedom	Maggie Phair	5,706	5.5
Total votes		103,875	100.0
Turnout			
Democratic hold			

=== 1992 ===
1992 United States House of Representatives elections in California, District 24
Party	Candidate	Votes	%
Democratic	Anthony C. Beilenson (inc.)	141,742	55.5
Republican	Tom McClintock	99,835	39.1
Peace and Freedom	John Paul Lindblad	13,690	5.4
Total votes		255,267	100.0
Turnout			
Democratic hold			

=== 1994 ===
1994 United States House of Representatives elections in California, District 24
Party	Candidate	Votes	%
Democratic	Anthony C. Beilenson (inc.)	95,342	49.35
Republican	Rich Sybert	91,806	47.52
Libertarian	John C. Koehler	6,031	3.12
Total votes		193,179	100.0
Turnout			
Democratic hold			

=== 1996 ===
1996 United States House of Representatives elections in California, District 24
Party	Candidate	Votes	%
Democratic	Brad Sherman	106,193	49.5
Republican	Rich Sybert	93,629	43.6
Peace and Freedom	Ralph Shroyer	6,267	2.9
Libertarian	Erich Miller	5,691	2.6
Natural Law	Ron Lawrence	3,068	1.4
Total votes		214,848	100.0
Turnout			
Democratic hold			

=== 1998 ===
1998 United States House of Representatives elections in California, District 24
Party	Candidate	Votes	%
Democratic	Brad Sherman (incumbent)	103,491	57.31
Republican	Randy Hoffman	69,501	38.49
Natural Law	Catherine Carter	3,033	1.68
Libertarian	Erich D. Miller	2,695	1.49
Peace and Freedom	Ralph Shroyer	1,860	1.03
Total votes		180,580	100.0
Turnout			
Democratic hold			

=== 2000 ===
2000 United States House of Representatives elections in California, District 24
Party	Candidate	Votes	%
Democratic	Brad Sherman (incumbent)	155,398	66.1
Republican	Jerry Doyle	70,169	29.8
Libertarian	Juan Carlos Ros	6,966	2.9
Natural Law	Michael Cuddehe	2,911	1.2
Total votes		235,444	100.0
Turnout			
Democratic hold			

=== 2002 ===
2002 United States House of Representatives elections in California, District 24
Party	Candidate	Votes	%
Republican	Elton Gallegly (incumbent)	120,585	65.2
Democratic	Fern Rudin	58,755	31.8
Libertarian	Gary Harber	5,666	3.0
Total votes		185,006	100.0
Turnout			
Republican hold			

=== 2004 ===
2004 United States House of Representatives elections in California, District 24
Party	Candidate	Votes	%
Republican	Elton Gallegly (incumbent)	178,660	62.9
Democratic	Brett Wagner	96,397	33.9
Green	Stuart A. Bechman	9,321	3.2
Total votes		284,378	100.0
Turnout			
Republican hold			

=== 2006 ===
2006 United States House of Representatives elections in California, District 24
Party	Candidate	Votes	%
Republican	Elton Gallegly (incumbent)	129,812	62.1
Democratic	Jill M. Martinez	79,461	37.9
No party	Michael Kurt Stettler (write-in)	16	0.0
No party	Henry Nicolle (write-in)	3	0.0
Total votes		209,292	100.0
Turnout			
Republican hold			

=== 2008 ===
2008 United States House of Representatives elections in California, District 24
Party	Candidate	Votes	%
Republican	Elton Gallegly (incumbent)	174,492	58.20
Democratic	Marta Ann Jorgensen	125,560	41.80
Turnout			
Republican hold			

=== 2010 ===
2010 United States House of Representatives elections in California, District 24
Party	Candidate	Votes	%
Republican	Elton Gallegly (incumbent)	144,055	59.94
Democratic	Timothy J. Allison	96,279	40.06
Turnout			
Republican hold			

=== 2012 ===
California's 24th congressional district election, 2012
Primary election
Party	Candidate	Votes	%
Democratic	Lois Capps (incumbent)	72,356	46.4
Republican	Abel Maldonado	46,295	29.7
Republican	Chris Mitchum	33,604	21.5
No party preference	Matt Boutté	3,832	2.5
Total votes		156,087	100.0
General election
Democratic	Lois Capps (incumbent)	156,749	55.1
Republican	Abel Maldonado	127,746	44.9
Total votes		284,495	100.0
Democratic hold			

=== 2014 ===
California's 24th congressional district election, 2014
Primary election
Party	Candidate	Votes	%
Democratic	Lois Capps (incumbent)	45,482	44.5
Republican	Christopher Mitchum	15,927	15.6
Republican	Justin Donald Fareed	15,013	14.7
Republican	Dale Francisco	12,256	12.0
Republican	Bradley Allen	6,573	6.4
Democratic	Sandra J. Marshall-Eminger	3,675	3.6
Democratic	Paul H. Coyne, Jr.	1,753	1.7
No party preference	Steve Isakson	947	0.9
Republican	Alexis Stuart	527	0.5
Total votes		102,153	100.00
General election
Democratic	Lois Capps (incumbent)	103,228	52%
Republican	Christopher Mitchum	95,566	48%
Total votes		198,794	100%
Democratic hold			

=== 2016 ===
2016 United States House of Representatives elections in California
Primary election
Party	Candidate	Votes	%
Democratic	Salud Carbajal	66,402	31.9
Republican	Justin Fareed	42,521	20.5
Republican	Katcho Achadjian	37,716	18.1
Democratic	Helene Schneider	31,046	14.9
Democratic	William "Bill" Ostrander	12,657	6.1
Republican	Matt T. Kokkonen	11,636	5.6
No party preference	John Uebersax	2,188	1.1
No party preference	Steve Isakson	2,172	1.0
Democratic	Benjamin Lucas	1,568	0.8
Total votes		207,906	100.0
General election
Democratic	Salud Carbajal	166,034	53.4
Republican	Justin Fareed	144,780	46.6
Total votes		310,814	100.0
Democratic hold			

=== 2018 ===
2018 United States House of Representatives elections in California
Primary election
Party	Candidate	Votes	%
Democratic	Salud Carbajal (incumbent)	94,558	53.6
Republican	Justin Fareed	64,177	36.4
Republican	Michael E. Woody	17,715	10.0
General election
Democratic	Salud Carbajal (incumbent)	166,550	58.6
Republican	Justin Fareed	117,881	41.4
Total votes		284,431	100.0
Democratic hold			

=== 2020 ===
2020 United States House of Representatives elections in California
Party	Candidate	Votes	%
Democratic	Salud Carbajal (incumbent)	139,973	57.8
Republican	Andy Caldwell	92,537	38.2
No party preference	Kenneth Young	9,650	4.0
Total votes		242,160	100.0
General election
Democratic	Salud Carbajal (incumbent)	212,564	58.7
Republican	Andy Caldwell	149,781	41.3
Total votes		362,345	100.0
Democratic hold			

=== 2022 ===
2022 United States House of Representatives elections in California
Party	Candidate	Votes	%
Democratic	Salud Carbajal (incumbent)	111,199	60.0
Republican	Brad Allen	57,532	31.0
No party preference	Michele R. Weslander Quaid	13,880	7.5
No party preference	Jeff Frankenfield	2,732	1.5
Total votes		185,343	100.0
General election
Democratic	Salud Carbajal (incumbent)	159,019	60.6
Republican	Brad Allen	103,533	39.4
Total votes		262,552	100.0
Democratic hold			

=== 2024 ===
2024 United States House of Representatives elections in California
Primary election
Party	Candidate	Votes	%
Democratic	Salud Carbajal (incumbent)	102,516	53.7
Republican	Thomas Cole	71,089	37.2
Democratic	Helena Pasquarella	17,293	9.1
General election
Democratic	Salud Carbajal (incumbent)	214,724	62.7
Republican	Thomas Cole	127,755	37.3
Total votes		342,479	100.0
Democratic hold			

== See also ==
- California's congressional districts
- List of United States congressional districts
