= Jordan Cunningham =

American politician (born 1977)

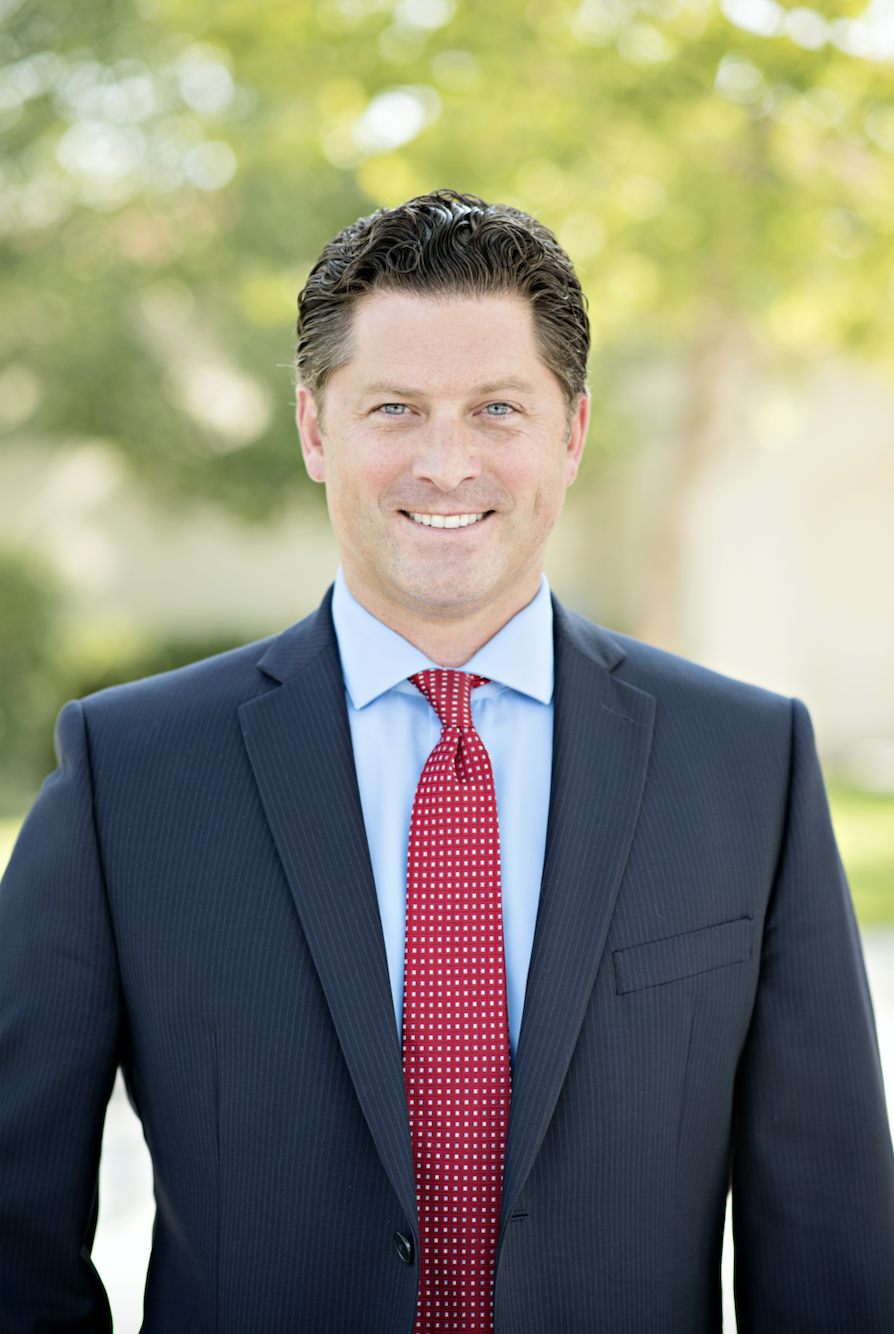

Member of the California State Assembly from the 35th district
- In office December 5, 2016 – December 5, 2022
- Preceded by: Katcho Achadjian
- Succeeded by: Dawn Addis (redistricting)

Personal details
- Born: December 6, 1977 (age 48) San Luis Obispo County, California
- Party: Republican
- Spouse: Shauna Roitenberg
- Children: 4
- Education: Point Loma Nazarene University (BS); UC Berkeley School of Law (JD)
- Occupation: Politician, Lawyer, Business Owner
- Website: https://ad35.asmrc.org https://jordancunningham.org

Jordan Cunningham (born December 6, 1977) is an American attorney and politician who represented the 35th district in the California State Assembly. He is a Republican who was elected in November 2016. Cunningham's district encompassed San Luis Obispo County and portions of Santa Barbara County. Prior to being elected to the state assembly, he was a school board trustee for the Templeton Unified School District and a Deputy District Attorney for San Luis Obispo County.

== Early life ==
Cunningham was born in San Luis Obispo, California, and grew up on the Central Coast. Cunningham graduated from Atascadero High School.

== Education ==
In 2000, Cunningham earned a bachelor of art degree in Physics and Economics from Point Loma Nazarene University. In 2004, Cunningham earned a JD degree from UC Berkeley School of Law.

== Career ==
Cunningham's career started as a prosecutor with the San Luis Obispo County District Attorney's Office. After leaving the county, Cunningham started his own firm, Cunningham Law Group which focuses on representing families and small businesses.

Cunningham first entered politics as a member of the Templeton Unified School District Board of Trustees before successfully running for the California State Assembly in 2016.

Prior to serving in elected office, Cunningham was President of the Central Coast Taxpayers Association.

On January 13, 2022, Cunningham announced that he would not be a candidate for reelection. Redistricting divided San Luis Obispo County made his Assembly district much more Democratic-voting.

== California State Assembly ==
=== Education ===
Cunningham introduced AB (Assembly Bill) 2385, which urges publishers to provide a detailed description of how newer versions of their materials differ from older ones, and AB 2580, which requires hearing officers to grant requests for hearing extensions by applying a specified standard of "good cause” in due process cases pertaining to special education matters. He co-introduced AB 1743, permanently funding the Career Technical Education Incentive Grant (CTEIG) which aims to equip students with necessary skills for the future economy.

=== Public safety ===
Cunningham introduced legislation that would improve background checks of law enforcement agencies (AB 1339) and strengthen the safety of passengers while using ride-sharing services (AB 2986).

Cunningham wrote legislation to increase protection orders for victims of human trafficking (AB 1735), and he gave trafficking victims more rights when it came time to testify in court (AB 1736). Cunningham also passed legislation which provided schools with the choice to teach their students about the dangers of trafficking and the possible consequences of "creating and sharing sexually suggestive or sexually explicit materials through cellular telephones, social networking Internet Web sites, computer networks, or other digital media" (AB 1868).

=== Healthcare ===
AB 653, introduced by Cunningham and signed into law authorizes a Santa Barbara County nonprofit hospital to enter into a joint powers agreement with a public agency. Additionally, this bill "prohibit[s] nonprofit hospitals and public agencies participating in the agreement from reducing or eliminating any emergency services following the creation of the joint powers authority without a public hearing."

=== Small business ===
In 2017 and 2018, Cunningham introduced three bills regarding small businesses on the Central Coast: AB 657 created a state liaison to advocate for employers, and AB 522 & AB 1986 allows winemakers and distillers to donate wine and spirits to nonprofits to use in fundraisers. Previously, California's Business and Professions Code prohibited nonprofits from selling donated alcoholic beverages.

=== Environment ===
Cunningham has been a vocal proponent of legislation aimed at reducing air pollution in California. In 2018, Cunningham introduced a resolution criticizing EPA rollbacks by the Trump Administration.

Cunningham, along with other Central Coast Legislators worked to lessen the impact from the closure of the Diablo Canyon Nuclear Power Plant. Cunningham and State Senator Bill Monning authored legislation that would address unemployment after the closure of the plant by providing job assistance programs to former employees. Cunningham also worked on legislation that provided an $85 million settlement for San Luis Obispo County to address impacts from the closure.

== Elections ==
=== 2016 election ===
Cunningham was elected to the California State Assembly in 2016 winning 55% of the vote over solar energy consultant Dawn Ortiz-Legg. After being elected, Cunningham detailed his priorities for office as increasing water infrastructure on the Central Coast by using Prop 1 funds. He is focused on improving access to Career Technical Education, and improving small business climate in California and on the Central Coast.

California State Assembly election, 2016
Primary election
Party	Candidate	Votes	%
Democratic	Dawn Ortiz-Legg	55,577	45.0
Republican	Jordan Cunningham	45,750	37.0
Republican	Steve Lebard	18,170	14.7
Libertarian	Dominic Robert Rubini	4,142	3.4
Total votes		123,639	100.0
General election
Republican	Jordan Cunningham	105,247	54.7
Democratic	Dawn Ortiz-Legg	87,168	45.3
Total votes		192,415	100.0
Republican hold			

=== 2018 election ===
In the 2018 election, Cunningham won re-election to the State Assembly, defeating Democratic farmer Bill Ostrander with 56% of the vote. In San Luis Obispo County, he won with 55% of the vote. In Santa Barbara County, he won with 59% of the vote. On December 3, 2018, he was sworn in for his second term representing the Central Coast and the 35th Assembly District.

California's 35th State Assembly district election, 2018
Primary election
Party	Candidate	Votes	%
Republican	Jordan Cunningham (incumbent)	62,348	55.5
Democratic	Bill Ostrander	49,967	44.5
Total votes		112,315	100.0
General election
Republican	Jordan Cunningham (incumbent)	97,749	55.9
Democratic	Bill Ostrander	76,994	44.1
Total votes		174,743	100.0
Republican hold			

=== 2020 election ===
In the 2020 election, Cunningham overcame the Democratic challenger, Morro Bay City Councilwoman Dawn Addis.

2020 California State Assembly election
Primary election
Party	Candidate	Votes	%
Republican	Jordan Cunningham (incumbent)	85,029	56.8%
Democratic	Dawn Addis	64,548	43.2%
Total votes		149,577	100.0%
General election
Republican	Jordan Cunningham (incumbent)	126,579	55.1%
Democratic	Dawn Addis	103,206	44.9%
Total votes		229,785	100.0%
Republican hold			

== Personal life ==
Cunningham's wife is Shauna Cunningham. They have four children.
