= Heidi Harmon =

American politician and environmental activist

Mayor of San Luis Obispo
- In office 2016–2021
- Preceded by: Jan Marx
- Succeeded by: Erica A. Stewart

Personal details
- Political party: Democratic
- Occupation: Politician, educator, and environmental activist

Heidi Harmon is an American educator, environmental activist, and politician. She was the Mayor of San Luis Obispo from 2016 to 2021.

== Early life and education ==
Harmon grew up in Pasadena, California. She has resided in San Luis Obispo for over 25 years. Harmon enrolled in Cuesta College where she got a degree in early childhood education, before transferring to Cal Poly, where she graduated with a BA in liberal studies.

== Career ==
Harmon was the Program Director of the San Luis Obispo chapter at 350.org, and was the chair of the Climate Change Task Force of the Santa Lucia Chapter at the Sierra Club. She was on the board of the League of Women Voters.

== Politics and elections ==
Harmon is an environmental activist and a backer of clean energy. She once described climate change as the "defining issue of our time," and that it was climate change that made her get into politics. Harmon first met Bernie Sanders at a progressive politics event in 2015. She was one of his supporters and she attended the 2016 Democratic National Convention as his delegate. Following Sanders' defeat, she urged Democrats to get serious about climate change, saying, "We can't let a climate-denying racist into the White House next year."

In 2014, she run against Republican Katcho Achadjian in the 35th district of California State Assembly elections, and got 34.7 percent of the votes.

After losing the State Assembly elections to Achadjian in 2014, Harmon said that it was expected and that the true victory is the impact her campaign made on her opponent approach to the elections. "Those are the ways we won", she said, pointing to one of Achadjian campaign ads which feature him in front of a solar energy field.

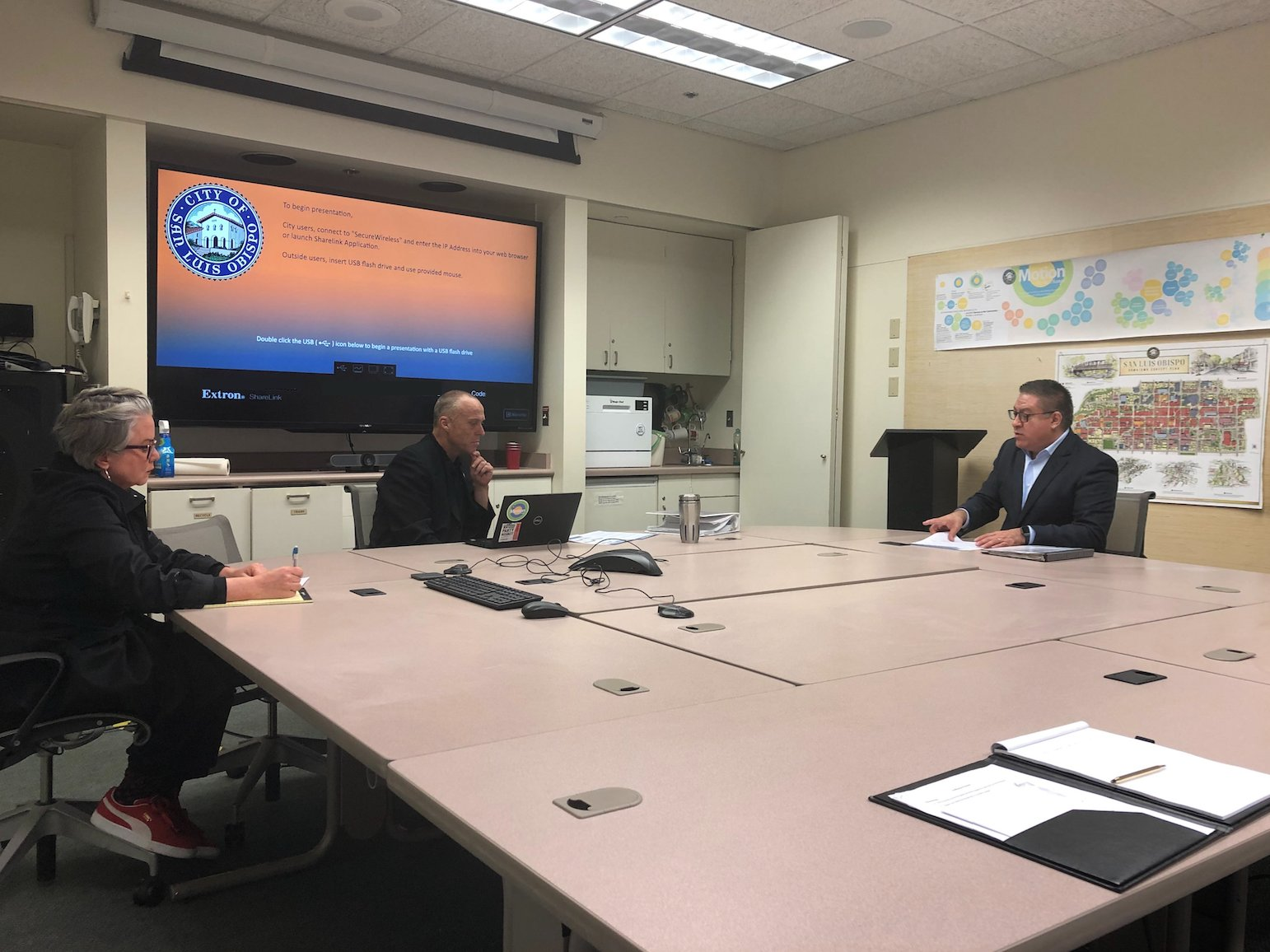
Heidi Harmon (left), Derek Johnson and Rep. Salud Carbajal (right) in a meeting amid San Luis Obispo's response to the COVID-19 pandemic

In 2016, Harmon ran against fellow Democrat—then-Mayor of San Luis Obispo—Jan Marx for the Mayoral seat. She won the election and became the Mayor of San Luis Obispo.

In 2018, she ran again for Mayor of San Luis Obispo. Her campaign slogan was "to make SLO a net-zero emissions city".

Harmon had been endorsed by Black Lives Matter Community Action of San Luis Obispo.

In 2020, Harmon accused District Attorney of San Luis Obispo Dan Dow of voter suppression by filing charges against BLM supporters of her campaign based on the color of their skins. Dow responded saying that "his office does not consider a person’s skin color when determining whether to file charges."

In December 2020, and in collaboration with local labor unions, she raised $71,000 for the SLO Food Bank.

At a press conference on 26 August 2021, Harmon announced her plan to step down from office as a Mayor of SLO on 26 September 2021, and that she will be focusing on her work as a Senior Public Affairs Director for the Romero Institute. When she was asked by reporters if the ongoing investigation of marijuana businessman Helios Dayspring influenced her decision to resign from her mayoral responsibilities, she said that she wasn't under investigation and that she "properly reported Dayspring’s donations."

Harmon ran her final City Council meeting, on 21 September 2021, with police protection after she received threatening and nude emails. Harmon said she had been facing harassment for the entirety of her tenure as a Mayor of SLO; however, it turns out she got caught censoring and possibly violating her constituents’ first amendment rights by blocking them from engaging in civil discourse, even if they were not harassing her, as she claims.

== Personal life ==
Harmon got divorced around the age of thirty. She is known for wearing a red rose on her hair. Jan Marx, then Mayor and her opponent for the 2016 elections, called her "flamboyant". She said her great grandmother was in the first Rose Parade in the nineteenth century.

On Wednesday 31 May 2017, a group of unknown vandals burned a pride flag that was hanging in front of Harmon's house. The police then started investigating the incident as a hate crime.
