= Pedro Nava (politician) =

American lawyer and former politician

Member of the California State Assembly from the 35th district
- In office December 6, 2004 – November 30, 2010
- Preceded by: Hannah-Beth Jackson
- Succeeded by: Das Williams

Personal details
- Born: February 6, 1948 (age 78) Monterrey, Mexico
- Party: Democratic

Pedro Nava (born February 6, 1948) is an American lawyer and former politician who was a Democratic member of the California State Assembly from 2004 to 2010. He represented parts of Santa Barbara and Ventura Counties. Nava works as a lawyer and consultant, specializing in the area of government relations. Nava ran unsuccessfully in the 2010 Democratic California Attorney General primary election, finishing in 4th place with 10% of the votes cast.

Nava was on the California Coastal Commission from 1997 to 2004. He was initially appointed by Speaker of the Assembly Cruz Bustamante and then reappointed to the Coastal Commission by then President pro Tempore of the Senate John Burton. Following his career in the Legislature, Nava was appointed to the Little Hoover Commission.
