= Jasmeet Bains =

American politician

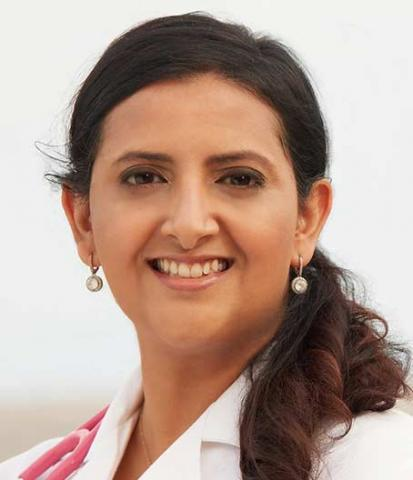

Member of the California State Assembly from the 35th district
- Incumbent
- Assumed office December 5, 2022
- Preceded by: Rudy Salas

Personal details
- Born: Delano, California, U.S.
- Party: Democratic
- Education: Illinois Institute of Technology (BS); American University of Antigua (MD)

Jasmeet Kaur Bains is an American physician and politician serving as a member of the California State Assembly for the 35th district since 2022. Bains is the first South Asian American woman and Sikh American elected to the body. She is considered to be one of the most moderate Democrats in the Assembly. She ran for a seat in the United States House of Representatives in 2026, placing third in the nonpartisan primary behind progressive Democrat Randy Villegas and incumbent Republican representative David Valadao.

== Early life and education ==
Bains was born in Delano, California, to Punjabi Sikh immigrants from India, where her father started as an auto mechanic then owned car dealerships. She earned a Bachelor of Science degree in biology from the Illinois Institute of Technology in 2006 and a Doctor of Medicine from the American University of Antigua in 2013.

== Career ==
Bains was working at her father's Chevrolet dealership in Taft, California, at the beginning of the Great Recession and decided to go into the medical field after witnessing people lose their jobs and health insurance.

From 2015 to 2018, Bains was a resident physician at Clinica Sierra Vista in Bakersfield, California. She worked as a family medicine physician at Omni Family Health from 2018 to 2020. In 2017, Bains was appointed to the California Healthcare Workforce Policy Commission by California Governor Jerry Brown. She also served as a member of the California Developmental Services Taskforce and as a volunteer physician for the California Emergency Medical Services Authority. She is currently a family doctor at Adventist Health's Delano branch.

== California State Assembly ==
=== Elections ===
Bains was first elected to the California State Assembly for the 35th district in November 2022, defeating fellow Democrat Kern County Supervisor Leticia Perez with 60% of the vote. The district is majority Latino and located within Kern County.

She was re-elected in 2024, defeating Republican candidate Robert Rosas with 57% of the vote.

=== Tenure ===
In August 2023, Bains authored a bill recognizing the 1984 Sikh genocide and received numerous threats afterwards from men, who appeared to be of Indian origin. She also coauthored state senator Aisha Wahab's SB 403 which would ban caste discrimination.

==== Oil and gas ====
Bains has voted against numerous Democratic proposals and with Republicans on bills that would harm the California oil and gas industry. In April 2023, Speaker Anthony Rendon removed Bains from the Assembly Business and Professions Committee after she was the lone Democrat to vote against a bill targeting oil companies over gas price gouging. She was reinstated a month later and stated that her vote represented Kern County's interests as an oil-producing region.

In June 2025, Bains demanded Liane Randolph resign as chair of the California Air Resources Board for raising gas prices.

==== Healthcare ====
In September 2024, Governor Gavin Newsom signed Bains's "Grow Our Own" bill which would mandate and establish a new funding pool for the creation of a new University of California medical school located in Kern County to address healthcare disparities in the region.

In April 2025, Bains stated "I am completely offended by the comments made about healthcare for undocumented immigrants...The idea that covering undocumented healthcare will increase healthcare costs is a completely nonsensical argument" after Republicans argued for cutting Medi-Cal access to undocumented immigrants.

==== Public safety ====
Bains supported Proposition 36 in 2024, which would increase penalties for certain theft and drug offenses.

In April 2025, Bains introduced a bill to raise the minimum sentencing of child torture from seven to twenty years. In May, Bains wrote a letter to the California Attorney General's office questioning why the former Kern County Supervisor Zack Scrivner was charged with child cruelty and possession of an assault rifle instead of child sexual abuse charges. The California Department of Justice responded saying that it only filed charges that could be proven "beyond a reasonable doubt".

==== Vote against California redistricting plan ====
In August 2025, Jasmeet Bains was the only Democrat in the California State Assembly to vote against Assembly Constitutional Amendment 8, which was the Democratic response to the Texas redistricting effort. The bill passed overwhelmingly in the California State Assembly by a vote of 57-20 and led to the November 2025 special election in which Californians passed 2025 California Proposition 50 by a 64% to 36% margin.

== 2026 U.S. House of Representatives campaign ==
The San Joaquin Valley Sun reported in April 2025 that Bains was "actively being recruited by the Democratic Congressional Campaign Committee and some California House Democrats" to run against David Valadao in the 2026 United States House of Representatives election. A month later, Bains appeared in an independent expenditure political advertisement calling for Valadao to vote against funding cuts to Medi-Cal, aired by a political action committee (PAC) funded by SEIU CA and local healthcare and homecare unions. On July 16, 2025, she officially announced her campaign, citing Valadao's vote for the Big Beautiful Bill Act and its associated Medicaid cuts as her reason for running. SEIU California endorsed her campaign the next day.

In May 2026, Planned Parenthood Action Fund endorsed Bains's campaign. She was endorsed by the Democratic Congressional Campaign Committee (DCCC), the New Democratic Coalition PAC, the Blue Dog PAC, and WelcomePAC. She benefited from outside spending from 314 Action, a PAC which supports Democratic candidates with STEM backgrounds, and from the group Democratic Majority for Israel. EDW Action Fund, an offshoot of Elect Democratic Women, also spent heavily in support of her candidacy. Bains's only Democratic opponent, Randy Villegas, ran to her left while receiving endorsements from Senator Bernie Sanders and the Congressional Progressive Caucus as well as outside spending from left leaning organizations like the progressive Working Families Party and the pro-Palestine super PAC American Priorities.

Bains placed third in the nonpartisan top-two primary, behind Villegas, who advanced to the general election along with incumbent representative David Valadao, who placed first.

== Electoral history ==
2022 California State Assembly 35th district election
Primary election
Party	Candidate	Votes	%
Democratic	Leticia Perez	14,101	50.5
Democratic	Jasmeet Bains	13,812	49.5
Total votes		27,913	100.0
General election
Democratic	Jasmeet Bains	35,998	60.3
Democratic	Leticia Perez	23,709	39.7
Total votes		59,707	100.0
Democratic hold			

2024 California State Assembly 35th district election
Primary election
Party	Candidate	Votes	%
Democratic	Jasmeet Bains (incumbent)	20,183	57.0
Republican	Robert Rosas	15,254	43.0
Total votes		35,437	100.0
General election
Democratic	Jasmeet Bains (incumbent)	59,454	57.6
Republican	Robert Rosas	43,821	42.4
Total votes		103,275	100.0
Democratic hold			

2026 United States House of Representatives elections in California#District 22
Party	Candidate	Votes	%
Republican	David Valadao (incumbent)	32,491	40.7
Democratic	Randy Villegas	25,808	32.3
Democratic	Jasmeet Bains	21,458	26.9
Total votes		79,757	100.0
