= Helene Schneider =

American politician (born 1970)

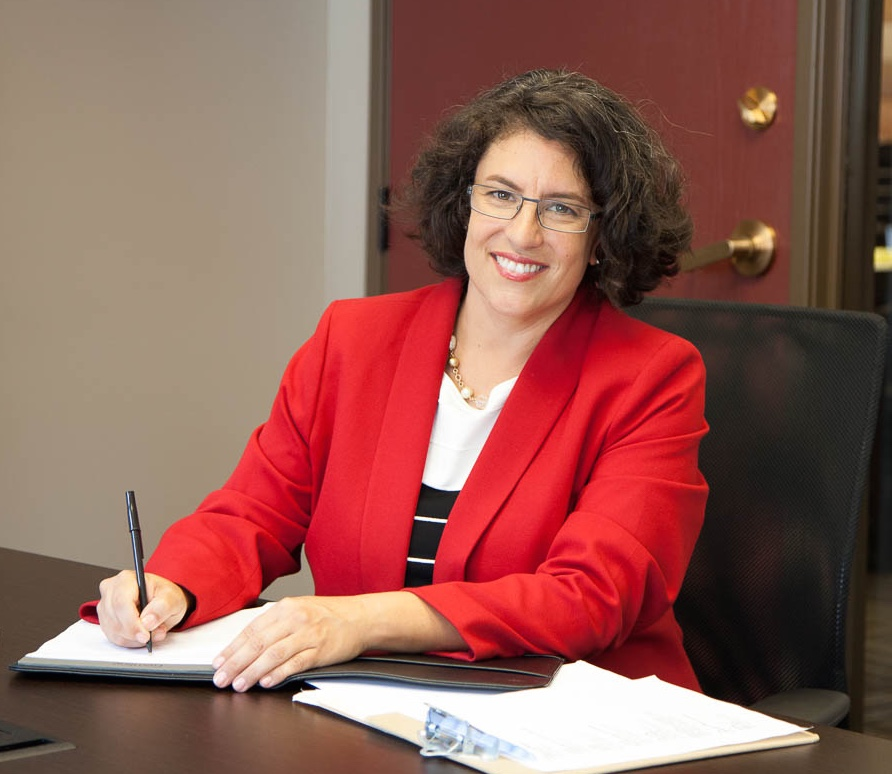
- Helene Schneider in 2015

Mayor of Santa Barbara, California
- In office January 11, 2010 – January 9, 2018
- Preceded by: Marty Blum
- Succeeded by: Cathy Murillo

Member of the Santa Barbara City Council
- In office January 7, 2003 – January 11, 2010

Personal details
- Born: November 18, 1970 (age 55) New York City, New York, U.S.
- Party: Democratic
- Education: Skidmore College, Professional Designation in Human Resources Management, University of California, Santa Barbara
- Occupation: Human Resources Management, politician
- Website: Personal website

Helene Schneider (born November 18, 1970) is an American politician from the Democratic Party. She was the mayor of Santa Barbara, California from 2010 to 2018, and a 2016 candidate for California's 24th congressional district. She was first elected mayor in 2009, succeeding Marty Blum. She won reelection to a second term in 2013. Prior to serving in government, Schneider worked at Planned Parenthood as the director of human resources for the affiliate serving Santa Barbara, Ventura, and San Luis Obispo counties. She is Jewish.

== Political career ==
Schneider credits former mayor Harriet Miller with giving her a start in city politics by appointing her as a Commissioner for the Housing Authority of Santa Barbara. In 2003, she was elected to the Santa Barbara City Council and reelected in 2007. Her first political involvement on the Central Coast was working for Jack O'Connell's successful reelection campaign to the California State Assembly in 1992.

In 2009, Schneider was elected mayor in an open-seat race. She won with 45.8% of the vote followed by Dale Francisco with 33.9%, Steve Cushman with 16.3%, and two other candidates splitting the remaining votes. She was reelected mayor in 2013 in a two-way race with Wayne Scoles, winning 73% to 26%.

In 2016, Schneider ran for the 24th congressional district, which was left open due to the retirement of longtime representative Lois Capps. In the primary field of 9 candidates, Schneider was considered to be one of the frontrunners, alongside fellow Democrat and Santa Barbara County Supervisor Salud Carbajal, Republican Assemblyman Katcho Achadjian, and Republican Justin Fareed. However, Schneider came in fourth in the primary, with 31,046 votes (14.9%). Carbajal went on to defeat Fareed in the general election.

== See also ==
- List of mayors of Santa Barbara, California
