= California's 35th State Assembly district =

American legislative district

Current assemblymember
Jasmeet Bains; D–Bakersfield
- Population (2020): 482,837
- Demographics: 12.95% White; 5.15% Black; 74.95% Latino; 4.28% Asian; 0.42% Native American; 0.08% Hawaiian/Pacific Islander; 0.44% other; 1.73% remainder of multiracial

California's 35th State Assembly district is one of 80 California State Assembly districts. It is currently represented by Democrat Jasmeet Bains of Delano.

== District profile ==
The district is located in the Central Valley wholly within Kern County, including agricultural towns in the north and East Bakersfield in the south.

Kern County - 54.09%

- Arvin
- Bakersfield (56.90%)
- Delano
- McFarland
- Shafter
- Wasco

== Election results from statewide races ==
Year	Office	Results
2021	Recall	No 51.0 – 49.0%
2020	President	Biden 54.1 – 43.5%
2018	Governor	Cox 50.4 – 49.6%
2018	Senator	de Leon 51.7 – 48.3%
2016	President	Clinton 49.6 – 43.4%
2016	Senator	Harris 60.1 – 39.9%
2014	Governor	Brown 51.7 – 48.3%
2012	President	Romney 49.2 – 47.6%
2012	Senator	Emken 50.4 – 49.6%

== List of assembly members representing the district ==
Due to redistricting, the 35th district has been moved around different parts of the state. The current iteration resulted from the 2021 redistricting by the California Citizens Redistricting Commission.

Assembly Members	Party	Years served	Counties represented	Notes
N. T. Whitcomb	Republican	January 5, 1885 – January 3, 1887	San Francisco	
John H. Colbert	Democratic	January 3, 1887 – November 18, 1888	San Francisco	Died before finishing his term ended in office from pneumonia.
Vacant		November 18, 1888 – January 7, 1889	San Francisco	
H. H. Dobbin	Democratic	January 7, 1889 – January 5, 1891	San Francisco	
William J. Dunn	Democratic	January 5, 1891 – January 2, 1893	San Francisco	
J. G. Gallagher	Republican	January 2, 1893 – January 7, 1895	San Francisco	
Calvin Ewing	People's	January 7, 1895 – January 4, 1897	San Francisco	
Lawrence J. Dolan	Fusion	January 4, 1897 – January 2, 1899	San Francisco	
W.H. Cobb	Republican	January 2, 1899 – January 1, 1901	San Francisco	
Edward F. Treadwell	Republican	January 1, 1901 – January 5, 1903	San Francisco	
Edward D. Knight	Republican	January 5, 1903 – January 2, 1905	San Francisco	
Edward F. Treadwell	Republican	January 2, 1905 – January 7, 1907	San Francisco	
Fred Hugo Hartman	Republican	January 7, 1907 – January 4, 1909	San Francisco	
Frederick Carsten Gerdes	Republican	January 4, 1909 – January 6, 1913	San Francisco	
Alfred L. Morgenstern	Republican	January 6, 1913 – January 4, 1915	Alameda	
Paul J. Arnerich	Republican	January 4, 1915 – January 6, 1919	Alameda	
William J. Locke	Republican	January 6, 1919 – January 3, 1921	Alameda	
Homer R. Spence	Republican	January 3, 1921 – January 3, 1927	Alameda	
Roy Bishop	Republican	January 3, 1927 – January 2, 1933	Alameda	
Ellis E. Patterson	Republican	January 2, 1933 – January 2, 1939	Monterey, San Luis Obispo	Changes his party registration to the Democratic Party in 1937.
Ellis E. Patterson	Democratic	January 2, 1933 – January 2, 1939	Monterey, San Luis Obispo	Changes his party registration to the Democratic Party in 1937.
Frederick Weybret	Republican	January 2, 1939 – January 4, 1943	Monterey, San Luis Obispo	
S.L. Heisinger	Democratic	January 4, 1943 – September 22, 1949	Fresno	Died in office. He was killed by a freight train.
Vacant		September 22, 1949 – March 8, 1950	Fresno	
William W. Hansen	Republican	March 8, 1950 – January 5, 1953	Fresno	Was sworn in after winning a special election after the death of Heisinger.
Roscoe L. Patterson	Republican	January 5, 1953 – July 9, 1955	Kings, Tulare	Died in office, while being treated in the hospital from a heart attack.
Vacant		July 9, 1955 – July 3, 1956	Kings, Tulare	
Domer F. Power	Republican	July 3, 1956 – January 7, 1957	Kings, Tulare	Sworn in during a special election to fill in seat vacant by his predecessor Patterson, after he died in office.
Myron H. Frew	Democratic	January 7, 1957 – January 4, 1965	Kings, Tulare	
Gordon W. Duffy	Republican	January 4, 1965 – January 2, 1967	Kings, Tulare	
John Briggs	Republican	January 2, 1967 – November 30, 1974	Orange, Bernardino	
Gary K. Hart	Democratic	December 2, 1974 – November 30, 1982	Santa Barbara	
Jack O'Connell	Democratic	December 6, 1982 – November 30, 1994	Santa Barbara, Ventura	
Brooks Firestone	Republican	December 5, 1994 – November 30, 1998	Santa Barbara, Ventura	
Hannah-Beth Jackson	Democratic	December 7, 1998 – November 30, 2004	Santa Barbara, Ventura	
Pedro Nava	Democratic	December 6, 2004 – November 30, 2010	Santa Barbara, Ventura	
Das Williams	Democratic	December 6, 2010 – November 30, 2012	Santa Barbara, Ventura	
Katcho Achadjian	Republican	December 3, 2012 – November 30, 2016	San Luis Obispo, Santa Barbara	
Jordan Cunningham	Republican	December 5, 2016 – November 30, 2022	San Luis Obispo, Santa Barbara	Redistricted to the 30th district and retired in 2022.
Jasmeet Bains	Democratic	December 5, 2022 – present	Kern	

== Election results (1990–present) ==
=== 2024 ===
2024 California State Assembly 35th district election
Primary election
Party	Candidate	Votes	%
Democratic	Jasmeet Bains (incumbent)	20,183	57.0
Republican	Robert Rosas	15,254	43.0
Total votes		35,437	100.0
General election
Democratic	Jasmeet Bains (incumbent)	59,454	57.6
Republican	Robert Rosas	43,821	42.4
Total votes		103,275	100.0
Democratic hold			

=== 2022 ===
2022 California State Assembly 35th district election
Primary election
Party	Candidate	Votes	%
Democratic	Leticia Perez	14,101	50.5
Democratic	Jasmeet Bains	13,812	49.5
Total votes		27,913	100.0
General election
Democratic	Jasmeet Bains	35,998	60.3
Democratic	Leticia Perez	23,709	39.7
Total votes		59,707	100.0
Democratic gain from Republican			

=== 2020 ===
2020 California State Assembly 35th district election
Primary election
Party	Candidate	Votes	%
Republican	Jordan Cunningham (incumbent)	85,029	56.8
Democratic	Dawn Addis	64,548	43.2
Total votes		149,577	100.0
General election
Republican	Jordan Cunningham (incumbent)	126,579	55.1
Democratic	Dawn Addis	103,206	44.9
Total votes		229,785	100.0
Republican hold			

=== 2018 ===
2018 California State Assembly 35th district election
Primary election
Party	Candidate	Votes	%
Republican	Jordan Cunningham (incumbent)	62,348	55.5
Democratic	Bill Ostrander	49,967	44.5
Total votes		112,315	100.0
General election
Republican	Jordan Cunningham (incumbent)	97,749	55.9
Democratic	Bill Ostrander	76,994	44.1
Total votes		174,743	100.0
Republican hold			

=== 2016 ===
2016 California State Assembly 35th district election
Primary election
Party	Candidate	Votes	%
Democratic	Dawn Ortiz-Legg	55,577	45.0
Republican	Jordan Cunningham	45,750	37.0
Republican	Steve Lebard	18,170	14.7
Libertarian	Dominic Robert Rubini	4,142	3.4
Total votes		123,639	100.0
General election
Republican	Jordan Cunningham	105,247	54.7
Democratic	Dawn Ortiz-Legg	87,168	45.3
Total votes		192,415	100.0
Republican hold			

=== 2014 ===
2014 California State Assembly 35th district election
Primary election
Party	Candidate	Votes	%
Republican	Katcho Achadjian (incumbent)	54,615	65.3
Democratic	Heidi Harmon	29,030	34.7
Total votes		83,645	100.0
General election
Republican	Katcho Achadjian (incumbent)	77,452	62.7
Democratic	Heidi Harmon	46,126	37.3
Total votes		123,578	100.0
Republican hold			

=== 2012 ===
2012 California State Assembly 35th district election
Primary election
Party	Candidate	Votes	%
Republican	Katcho Achadjian (incumbent)	62,747	64.9
Democratic	Gerald "Gerry" Manata	33,862	35.1
Total votes		96,609	100.0
General election
Republican	Katcho Achadjian (incumbent)	103,762	61.3
Democratic	Gerald "Gerry" Manata	65,500	38.7
Total votes		169,262	100.0
Republican gain from Democratic			

=== 2010 ===
2010 California State Assembly 35th district election
Party	Candidate	Votes	%
Democratic	Das Williams	75,821	54.9
Republican	Mike Stoker	62,310	45.1
Total votes		138,131	100.0
Democratic hold			

=== 2008 ===
2008 California State Assembly 35th district election
Party	Candidate	Votes	%
Democratic	Pedro Nava (incumbent)	119,613	67.3
Republican	Gregory Gandrud	58,244	32.7
Total votes		177,857	100.0
Democratic hold			

=== 2006 ===
2006 California State Assembly 35th district election
Party	Candidate	Votes	%
Democratic	Pedro Nava (incumbent)	77,868	68.3
Republican	Cristina Martin	46,109	31.7
Total votes		123,977	100.0
Democratic hold			

=== 2004 ===
2004 California State Assembly 35th district election
Party	Candidate	Votes	%
Democratic	Pedro Nava	91,503	52.7
Republican	Bob Pohl	82,025	47.3
Total votes		173,528	100.0
Democratic hold			

=== 2002 ===
2002 California State Assembly 35th district election
Party	Candidate	Votes	%
Democratic	Hannah-Beth Jackson (incumbent)	72,394	61.7
Republican	Bob Pohl	37,026	31.6
Reform	Cary Savitch	3,827	3.3
Libertarian	Craig Warren Thomas	3,051	2.5
No party	Christina Carreno Martin (write-in)	1,095	0.9
Total votes		117,393	100.0
Democratic hold			

=== 2000 ===
2000 California State Assembly 35th district election
Party	Candidate	Votes	%
Democratic	Hannah-Beth Jackson (incumbent)	100,432	61.6
Republican	Robin Sue Sullivan	58,212	35.7
Natural Law	Eric Dahl	4,264	2.6
Total votes		162,908	100.0
Democratic hold			

=== 1998 ===
1998 California State Assembly 35th district election
Party	Candidate	Votes	%
Democratic	Hannah-Beth Jackson	67,224	53.0
Republican	Christopher Mitchum	56,382	44.5
Natural Law	Eric Dahl	3,151	2.5
Total votes		126,757	100.0
Democratic gain from Republican			

=== 1996 ===
1996 California State Assembly 35th district election
Party	Candidate	Votes	%
Republican	Brooks Firestone (incumbent)	101,014	66.0
Democratic	Aneesh K. Lele	44,531	29.1
Natural Law	Miriam Hospodar	7,415	4.8
Total votes		152,960	100.0
Republican hold			

=== 1994 ===
1994 California State Assembly 35th district election
Party	Candidate	Votes	%
Republican	Brooks Firestone	72,899	54.3
Democratic	Mindy Lorenz	55,901	41.6
Green	T. G. "Tom" Stafford	2,862	2.1
Libertarian	Chris D. Blunt	2,682	2.0
Total votes		134,344	100.0
Republican gain from Democratic			

=== 1992 ===
1992 California State Assembly 35th district election
Party	Candidate	Votes	%
Democratic	Jack O'Connell (incumbent)	111,313	66.7
Republican	Alan O. "Lanny" Ebenstein	55,490	33.3
Total votes		166,803	100.0
Democratic hold			

=== 1990 ===
1990 California State Assembly 35th district election
Party	Candidate	Votes	%
Democratic	Jack O'Connell (incumbent)	60,126	67.0
Republican	Connie O'Shaughnessy	29,677	33.0
Total votes		89,803	100.0
Democratic hold			

== See also ==
- California State Assembly
- California State Assembly districts
- Districts in California
