= Hannah-Beth Jackson =

American politician (born 1950)

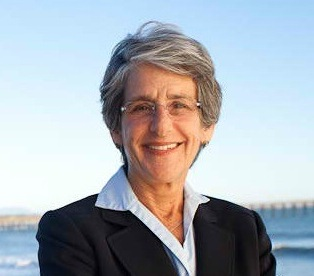

Member of the California State Senate from the 19th district
- In office December 3, 2012 – November 30, 2020
- Preceded by: Tony Strickland
- Succeeded by: Monique Limón

Member of the California State Assembly from the 35th district
- In office December 7, 1998 - November 30, 2004
- Preceded by: Brooks Firestone
- Succeeded by: Pedro Nava

Personal details
- Born: May 19, 1950 (age 76) Boston, Massachusetts, U.S.
- Party: Democratic
- Spouse: George Eskin
- Children: 3
- Education: Scripps College (BA); Boston University (JD)

Hannah-Beth Jackson (born May 19, 1950) is an American politician who served in the California State Senate from 2012 to 2020. A Democrat, she represented the 19th Senate District, encompassing Santa Barbara County and most of Ventura County. She is primarily known for her equal pay act, the California Fair Pay Act, passed in 2015.

Prior to her election to the State Senate, Jackson served in the California State Assembly from 1998 to 2004, representing the 35th Assembly District. Jackson was elected to the California State Senate, succeeding Republican Tony Strickland in 2012. In 2016, she was reelected to a second term.

Jackson served as Chair of the California Legislative Women's Caucus from 2015 to 2016. She is also a member of the California Legislative Jewish Caucus. Jackson is a former prosecutor, the co-founder of two nonprofit organizations, and also served as an adjunct professor at Antioch University.

== Early life and education ==
Jackson was born in Boston, Massachusetts, on May 19, 1950. In 1971, Jackson received her bachelor of arts degree in Government and Sociology from Scripps College in Claremont, California. In 1975, Jackson earned her Juris Doctor degree from Boston University School of Law.

== Career in Public Office ==
=== State Senate ===
==== Committees and caucuses ====
Jackson served as chair of the Senate Judiciary Committee and the Joint Legislative Committee on Emergency Management. She also served as a member of the Senate Committee on Natural Resources and Water, the Senate Budget and Fiscal Review Committee, the Senate Labor and Industrial Relations Committee and the Senate Public Safety Committee. Additionally, she served as chair of the California Legislative Women's Caucus.

=== Tenure ===
Jackson initially ran for the 19th Senate District in 2008 but lost by only 857 votes to Republican Tony Strickland. Later, Strickland chose not to pursue reelection to the State Senate in 2012 in order to mount an unsuccessful run for the U.S. House of Representatives, Jackson won the seat.

On October 18, 2011, Jackson announced that she would run for the California State Senate's 19th District seat. She was endorsed by the California Democratic Party, the Sierra Club, the California Teachers Association, Service Employees International Union (SEIU) State Council, the California League of Conservation Voters, and the California Democratic Council, along with over 90 additional endorsements. Jackson won the general election on November 6, 2012, and took the oath of office on December 3.

In 2013, Jackson introduced a bill allow 16-year-olds to pre-register to vote. Senate Bill 113 was passed and signed into law in 2014, and took effect in 2017. Now 16- and 17-year-olds in California can pre-register to vote online.

In 2015 the California Fair Pay Act, her equal pay bill, was signed into law. It is one of the toughest pay equity laws in the nation. The law ensures that employees are not paid more for substantially similar work because of their gender.

In 2016 Huffington Post named Jackson one of 11 women around the country "blazing new trails" in American politics.

In 2017, Governor Jerry Brown signed into law her SB 63, the New Parent Leave Act, to provide 12 weeks of job-protected maternity and paternity leave for California employees who work for companies with 20 or more employees.

In 2018, Governor Brown signed into law her SB 826, which required gender diversity on California's corporate boards.

In 2020, Jackson's SB 1383 to expand job protection for family leave to millions of Californians was signed into law by Governor Newsom.

==== Awards and honors ====
Jackson has received "Legislator of the Year" awards from a wide range of organizations, including the Consumer Federation of California, Congress of California Seniors, California League of Conservation Voters, Californians Against Waste, National Organization for Women, and Junior League of California. She is the recipient of the California Women Lawyers's annual Fay Stender Award. She was named the "state Senator shifting California's workplace culture" by The New York Times.

== Personal life ==
Jackson has practiced law in Santa Barbara and Ventura County for 20 years. She is Jewish.

Jackson is married to retired Santa Barbara County Superior Court Judge George Eskin. She has a daughter, Jennie, two stepchildren and six grandchildren.
