= Salud Carbajal =

Mexican American politician (born 1964)

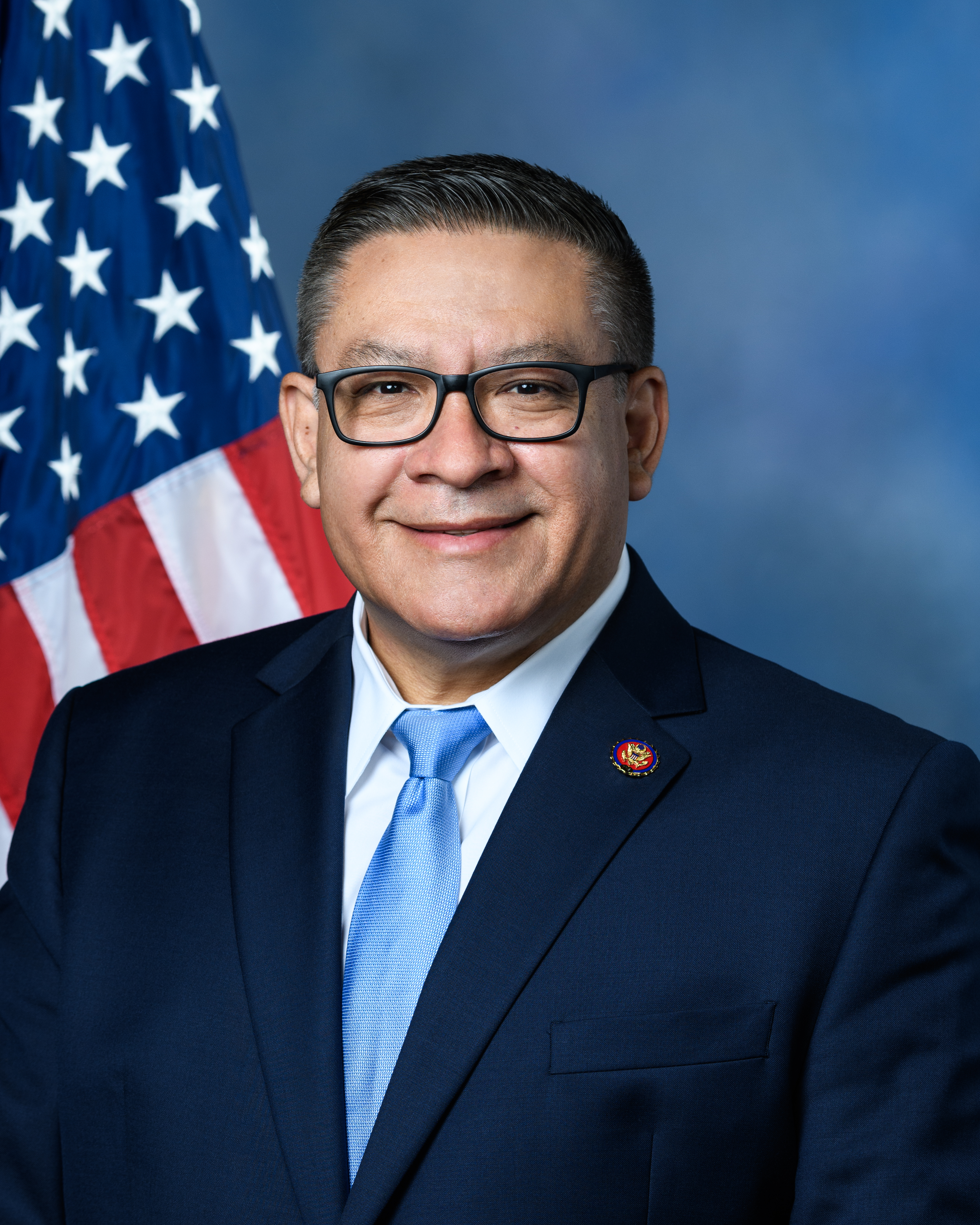
- Official portrait, 2020

Member of the U.S. House of Representatives from California's 24th district
- Incumbent
- Assumed office January 3, 2017
- Preceded by: Lois Capps

Member of the Santa Barbara County Board of Supervisors from the 1st district
- In office 2005–2017
- Preceded by: Naomi Schwartz
- Succeeded by: Das Williams

Personal details
- Born: Salud Ortiz Carbajal; November 18, 1964 (age 61) Moroleón, Guanajuato, Mexico
- Party: Democratic
- Spouse: Gina Carbajal
- Children: 2
- Education: University of California, Santa Barbara (BA); Fielding Graduate University (MA)
- Website: House website Campaign website

Military service
- Branch/service: United States Marine Corps; Marine Corps Reserve
- Years of service: 1984–1992
- Carbajal's voice Carbajal supporting the American Rescue Plan. Recorded May 12, 2021

Salud Ortiz Carbajal (/səˈluːd ˈkɑːrbəhɑːl/ sə-LOOD KAR-bə-hahl; born November 18, 1964) is an American politician serving as the U.S. representative for California's 24th congressional district since 2017. He is a member of the Democratic Party, and his district covers Santa Maria, San Luis Obispo and Santa Barbara.

== Early life and education ==
Carbajal was born in Moroleón, Mexico, in 1964 and immigrated to the United States, initially to Arizona, later settling in Oxnard, California, with his family, where his father was a farmworker.

Carbajal attended the University of California, Santa Barbara, where he earned a Bachelor of Arts degree in 1990, and Fielding Graduate University, where he earned a master's degree in organizational management.

== Political career ==
Carbajal served in the United States Marine Corps Reserve for eight years, including during the Gulf War, although he did not leave the contiguous United States.

=== Santa Barbara County Board of Supervisors ===
Carbajal was first elected to the Santa Barbara County Board of Supervisors in 2004, representing the first district as a Democrat. He was reelected in 2008 and 2012.

=== U.S. House of Representatives ===
==== Elections ====
===== 2016 =====
In 2015, Carbajal announced his intention to run for the 24th district after incumbent Lois Capps announced her retirement. Carbajal was seen as one of the two Democratic front-runners in the open primary, alongside Santa Barbara mayor Helene Schneider, and was rivaled by Republican front-runners Assemblyman Katcho Achadjian and small businessman and former congressional aide Justin Fareed. The primary field consisted of four Democrats, three Republicans, and two independent candidates.

In the June 7 primary, Carbajal came in first, with 66,402 votes (31.9%). The runner-up was Fareed, who received 42,521 (20.5%).

In the November 8 general election, Carbajal received 53.4% of the vote to Fareed's 46.6%, a popular vote margin of about 21,000.

===== 2018 =====
Carbajal was reelected over Republican challenger Fareed with 58.6% of the vote.

===== 2020 =====
Carbajal was reelected to a third term over Republican challenger Andy Caldwell, a nonprofit executive, with 58.7% of the vote.

===== 2022 =====
Carbajal was reelected to a fourth term over Republican challenger Brad Allen with 60.6% of the vote.

===== 2024 =====
Carbajal was reelected to a fifth term over Republican challenger Thomas Cole with 62.7% of the vote.

==== Tenure ====
As of October 2021, Carbajal had voted in line with Joe Biden's stated position 100% of the time.

==== Committee assignments ====
For the 118th Congress:

- Committee on Agriculture
  - Subcommittee on General Farm Commodities, Risk Management, and Credit
- Committee on Armed Services
  - Subcommittee on Strategic Forces
  - Subcommittee on Tactical Air and Land Forces
- Committee on Transportation and Infrastructure
  - Subcommittee on Aviation
  - Subcommittee on Coast Guard and Maritime Transportation (Ranking Member)
  - Subcommittee on Highways and Transit

==== Caucus memberships ====
- Congressional Equality Caucus
- New Democrat Coalition
- House Baltic Caucus
- Congressional Hispanic Caucus
- Congressional Asian Pacific American Caucus
- Congressional Taiwan Caucus
- Climate Solutions Caucus
- Problem Solvers Caucus
- Congressional Solar Caucus
- Congressional Caucus for the Equal Rights Amendment
- Rare Disease Caucus
- Congressional Tequila Caucus

== Political positions ==
=== Abortion ===
Carbajal opposed the 2022 overturning of Roe v. Wade, calling it a "betrayal to our Constitution [and] a betrayal of millions of women who count on its protections to retain control of their own body and choices."

=== Israel ===
Carbajal voted to voice support for Israel following the 2023 Hamas attack on Israel. However, as the humanitarian situation in Gaza deteriorated, he became more critical of Benjamin Netanyahu's war strategy. In July 2026, Carbajal voted "yes" for Thomas Massie's amendment to H.R. 8595, seeking to halt $3.3 billion in Military funding to Israel.

=== Transgender Issues ===
While stating he was "vehemently opposed" to the provisions which banned gender-affirming care for transgender children in the Fiscal Year 2025 National Defense Authorization Act, Carbajal still voted yes to pass the bill.

== Personal life ==
Carbajal lives in Santa Barbara, California and is married to Gina, with whom he has two children.

=== Foreign awards ===
- Ukraine
  - Honorary Diploma of the Verkhovna Rada of Ukraine (2024) – Awarded by Ukrainian Parliament; presented by Ruslan Stefanchuk, Chairman of the Verkhovna Rada.

== Electoral history ==
2016 United States House of Representatives elections in California
Primary election
Party	Candidate	Votes	%
Democratic	Salud Carbajal	66,402	31.9
Republican	Justin Fareed	42,521	20.5
Republican	Katcho Achadjian	37,716	18.1
Democratic	Helene Schneider	31,046	14.9
Democratic	William "Bill" Ostrander	12,657	6.1
Republican	Matt T. Kokkonen	11,636	5.6
No party preference	John Uebersax	2,188	1.1
No party preference	Steve Isakson	2,172	1.0
Democratic	Benjamin Lucas	1,568	0.8
Total votes		207,906	100.0
General election
Democratic	Salud Carbajal	166,034	53.4
Republican	Justin Fareed	144,780	46.6
Total votes		310,814	100.0
Democratic hold			

2018 United States House of Representatives elections in California
Primary election
Party	Candidate	Votes	%
Democratic	Salud Carbajal (incumbent)	94,558	53.6
Republican	Justin Fareed	64,177	36.4
Republican	Michael E. Woody	17,715	10.0
General election
Democratic	Salud Carbajal (incumbent)	166,550	58.6
Republican	Justin Fareed	117,881	41.4
Total votes		284,431	100.0
Democratic hold			

2020 United States House of Representatives elections in California
Party	Candidate	Votes	%
Democratic	Salud Carbajal (incumbent)	139,973	57.8
Republican	Andy Caldwell	92,537	38.2
No party preference	Kenneth Young	9,650	4.0
Total votes		242,160	100.0
General election
Democratic	Salud Carbajal (incumbent)	212,564	58.7
Republican	Andy Caldwell	149,781	41.3
Total votes		362,345	100.0
Democratic hold			

2022 United States House of Representatives elections in California
Party	Candidate	Votes	%
Democratic	Salud Carbajal (incumbent)	111,199	60.0
Republican	Brad Allen	57,532	31.0
No party preference	Michele R. Weslander Quaid	13,880	7.5
No party preference	Jeff Frankenfield	2,732	1.5
Total votes		185,343	100.0
General election
Democratic	Salud Carbajal (incumbent)	159,019	60.6
Republican	Brad Allen	103,533	39.4
Total votes		262,552	100.0
Democratic hold			

2024 United States House of Representatives elections in California
Primary election
Party	Candidate	Votes	%
Democratic	Salud Carbajal (incumbent)	102,516	53.7
Republican	Thomas Cole	71,089	37.2
Democratic	Helena Pasquarella	17,293	9.1
General election
Democratic	Salud Carbajal (incumbent)	214,724	62.7
Republican	Thomas Cole	127,755	37.3
Total votes		342,479	100.0
Democratic hold			

== See also ==
- List of Hispanic and Latino Americans in the United States Congress

U.S. House of Representatives
Preceded by Lois Capps	Member of the U.S. House of Representatives from California's 24th congressional district 2017–present	Incumbent
U.S. order of precedence (ceremonial)
Preceded by Andy Biggs	United States representatives by seniority 160th	Succeeded by Lou Correa
