= 2012 California State Assembly election =

- November 6, 2012

All 80 seats in the California State Assembly 41 seats needed for a majority
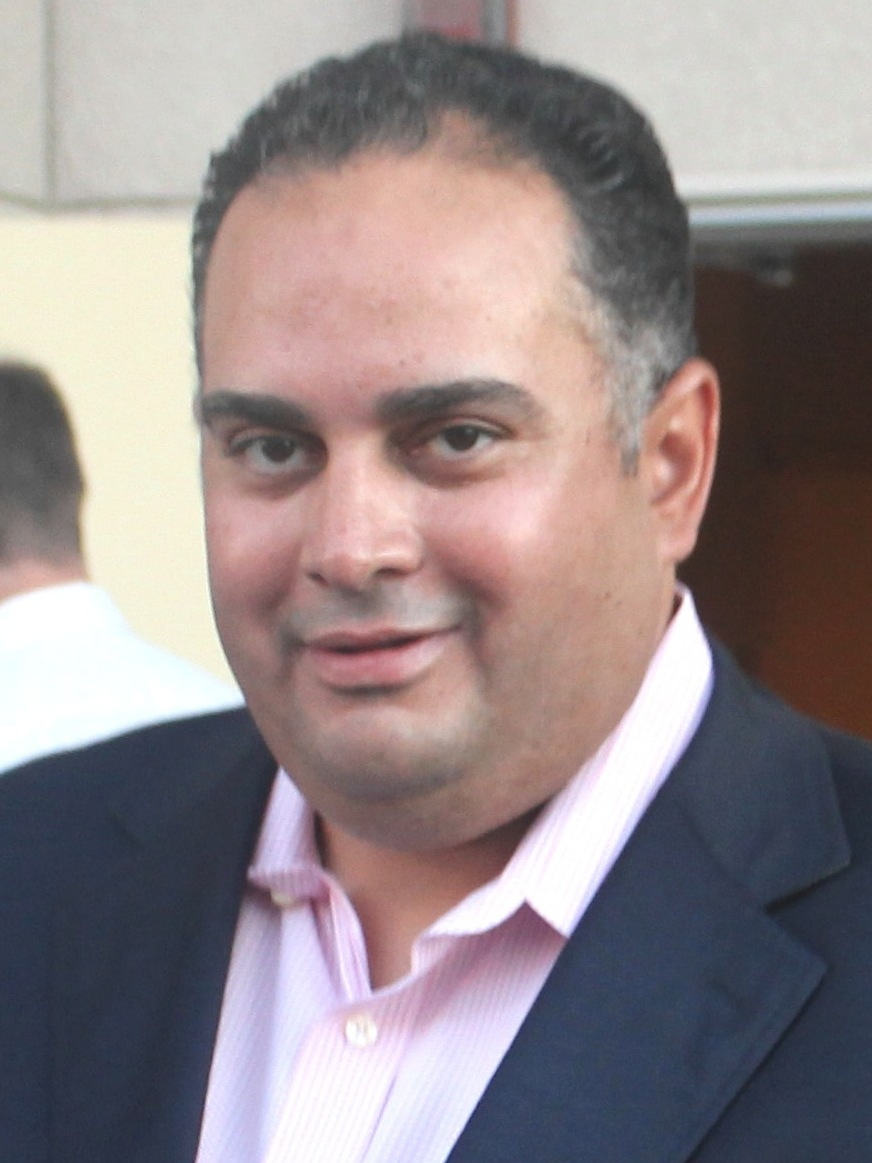

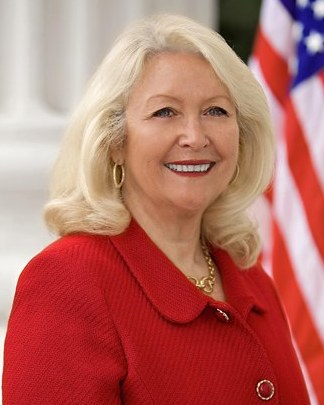
	Majority party	Minority party
Leader	John Pérez	Connie Conway
Party	Democratic	Republican
Leader since	March 1, 2010	December 6, 2010
Leader's seat	53rd–Los Angeles	26th–Tulare
Last election	52 seats, 54.27%	28 seats, 43.67%
Seats won	55	25
Seat change	▲3	▼3
Popular vote	6,835,701	4,765,952
Percentage	58.46%	40.76%
Swing	▲4.19%	▼2.91%
- Democratic gain Republican gain Democratic hold Republican hold 50–60% 60–70% 70–80% 80–90% >90% 50–60% 60–70%
Speaker before election
John Pérez
Democratic
Elected Speaker
John Pérez
Democratic

The 2012 California State Assembly elections took place on November 6, 2012, with a primary election held on June 5, 2012. Voters in all 80 of California's state assembly districts voted for their representative. The Democrats gained three seats from the Republicans, winning 55 seats and securing a two-thirds supermajority in the chamber.

== Overview ==
California State Assembly elections, 2012 Primary election — June 5, 2012
Party	Votes	Percentage	Candidates	Advancing to general	Seats contesting
Democratic	2,481,326	52.27%	144	84	73
Republican	2,147,125	45.23%	114	72	65
No party preference	88,523	1.86%	9	1	1
Green	18,063	0.38%	3	0	0
Libertarian	9,871	0.21%	2	0	0
Peace and Freedom	2,055	0.04%	2	1	1
Valid votes	4,746,963	89.09%	—	—	—
Invalid votes	581,333	10.91%	—	—	—
Totals	5,328,296	100.00%	274	158	—
Voter turnout	31.06%				

California State Assembly elections, 2012 General election — November 6, 2012
Party	Votes	Percentage	Seats	+/–
Democratic	6,835,701	58.46%	55	▲3
Republican	4,765,952	40.76%	25	▼2
No party preference	66,239	0.57%	0	▼1
Peace and Freedom	25,167	0.22%	0	Steady
Valid votes	11,693,059	88.57%	—	—
Invalid votes	1,509,099	11.43%	—	—
Totals	13,202,158	100.00%	80	—
Voter turnout	72.36%			

↓
55	25
Democratic	Republican

== Predictions ==
Source	Ranking	As of
Governing	Safe D	October 24, 2012

== Results ==
=== District 1 ===
California's 1st State Assembly district election, 2012
Primary election
Party	Candidate	Votes	%
Republican	Brian Dahle	41,384	34.2
Republican	Rick Bosetti	34,457	28.5
Democratic	Robert Meacher	31,120	25.8
Green	David Edwards	7,381	6.1
Libertarian	Charley Hooper	6,503	5.4
Total votes		120,845	100.0
General election
Republican	Brian Dahle	116,098	65.6
Republican	Rick Bosetti	60,920	34.4
Total votes		177,018	100.0
Republican hold			

=== District 2 ===
California's 2nd State Assembly district election, 2012
Primary election
Party	Candidate	Votes	%
Democratic	Wesley Chesbro (incumbent)	60,414	64.1
Democratic	Tom Lynch	21,536	22.9
Green	Pamela Elizondo	8,261	8.8
Democratic	Firenza Xuan Pini	4,015	4.3
Total votes		94,226	100.0
General election
Democratic	Wesley Chesbro (incumbent)	111,451	63.1
Democratic	Tom Lynch	65,302	36.9
Total votes		176,753	100.0
Democratic hold			

=== District 3 ===
California's 3rd State Assembly district election, 2012
Primary election
Party	Candidate	Votes	%
Republican	Dan Logue (incumbent)	38,742	42.9
Democratic	Charles Rouse	28,926	32.0
Republican	Bob Williams	22,657	25.1
Total votes		90,325	100.0
General election
Republican	Dan Logue (incumbent)	86,692	55.6
Democratic	Charles Rouse	69,265	44.4
Total votes		155,957	100.0
Republican hold			

=== District 4 ===
California's 4th State Assembly district election, 2012
Primary election
Party	Candidate	Votes	%
Democratic	Mariko Yamada (incumbent)	51,821	59.2
Republican	John Munn	35,664	40.8
Total votes		87,485	100.0
General election
Democratic	Mariko Yamada (incumbent)	108,081	62.5
Republican	John Munn	64,946	37.5
Total votes		173,027	100.0
Democratic hold			

=== District 5 ===
California's 5th State Assembly district election, 2012
Primary election
Party	Candidate	Votes	%
Republican	Rico Oller	34,673	33.9
Republican	Frank Bigelow	29,584	28.9
Democratic	Tim (Timothy) K. Fitzgerald	18,138	17.7
Democratic	Mark Boyd	13,583	13.3
No party preference	Mark Belden	4,158	4.1
Republican	Kevin Lancaster	2,151	2.1
Total votes		102,287	100.0
General election
Republican	Frank Bigelow	82,293	52.3
Republican	Rico Oller	75,071	47.7
Total votes		157,364	100.0
Republican win (new seat)			

=== District 6 ===
California's 6th State Assembly district election, 2012
Primary election
Party	Candidate	Votes	%
Republican	Beth Gaines (incumbent)	38,827	37.1
Republican	Andy Pugno	33,382	31.9
Democratic	Regy Bronner	32,573	31.1
Total votes		104,782	100.0
General election
Republican	Beth Gaines (incumbent)	128,465	69.2
Republican	Andy Pugno	57,086	30.8
Total votes		185,551	100.0
Republican hold			

=== District 7 ===
California's 7th State Assembly district election, 2012
Primary election
Party	Candidate	Votes	%
Democratic	Roger Dickinson (incumbent)	41,100	68.0
Republican	Jonathan Zachariou	19,304	32.0
Total votes		60,404	100.0
General election
Democratic	Roger Dickinson (incumbent)	96,422	69.8
Republican	Jonathan Zachariou	41,735	30.2
Total votes		138,157	100.0
Democratic hold			

=== District 8 ===
California's 8th State Assembly district election, 2012
Primary election
Party	Candidate	Votes	%
Democratic	Ken Cooley	33,304	42.8
Republican	Peter Tateishi	18,237	23.4
Republican	Barbara Ortega	15,592	20.0
Republican	John Thomas Flynn	4,853	6.2
Libertarian	Janice Marlae Bonser	3,368	4.3
Republican	Phillip A. Tufi	2,424	3.1
Total votes		77,778	100.0
General election
Democratic	Ken Cooley	92,630	54.3
Republican	Peter Tateishi	78,006	45.7
Total votes		170,636	100.0
Democratic win (new seat)			

=== District 9 ===
California's 9th State Assembly district election, 2012
Primary election
Party	Candidate	Votes	%
Democratic	Richard Pan (incumbent)	24,617	38.1
Republican	Antonio "Tony" Amador	13,060	20.2
Republican	Sophia Gonzales Scherman	10,029	15.5
Democratic	Tom Y. Santos	8,200	12.7
Republican	Edward J. Nemeth	6,823	10.5
Peace and Freedom	C.T. Weber	1,950	3.0
Total votes		64,679	100.0
General election
Democratic	Richard Pan (incumbent)	86,092	58.9
Republican	Antonio "Tony" Amador	60,136	41.1
Total votes		146,228	100.0
Democratic win (new seat)			

=== District 10 ===
California's 10th State Assembly district election, 2012
Primary election
Party	Candidate	Votes	%
Democratic	Michael Allen (incumbent)	32,922	31.0
Democratic	Marc Levine	25,920	24.4
Republican	Peter J. Mancus	22,708	21.4
Democratic	Connie Wong	11,371	10.7
Democratic	Alex Easton-Brown	6,563	6.2
No party preference	Joe Boswell	4,544	4.3
Democratic	H. Christian Gunderson	2,323	2.2
Total votes		106,351	100.0
General election
Democratic	Marc Levine	96,421	51.2
Democratic	Michael Allen (incumbent)	91,973	48.8
Total votes		188,394	100.0
Democratic hold			

=== District 11 ===
California's 11th State Assembly district election, 2012
Primary election
Party	Candidate	Votes	%
Republican	Mike Hudson	21,234	31.7
Democratic	Jim Frazier	18,846	28.1
Democratic	Patricia Hernández	11,844	17.7
No party preference	Len Augustine	10,048	15.0
Democratic	Gene Gantt	3,827	5.9
Democratic	Charles Kingeter	1,159	1.7
Total votes		66,958	100.0
General election
Democratic	Jim Frazier	96,893	62.0
Republican	Mike Hudson	59,420	38.0
Total votes		156,313	100.0
Democratic win (new seat)			

=== District 12 ===
California's 12th State Assembly district election, 2012
Primary election
Party	Candidate	Votes	%
Republican	Kristin Olsen (incumbent)	44,209	65.0
Democratic	Christopher Mateo	23,782	35.0
Total votes		67,991	100.0
General election
Republican	Kristin Olsen (incumbent)	89,821	60.6
Democratic	Christopher Mateo	58,517	39.4
Total votes		148,338	100.0
Republican hold			

=== District 13 ===
California's 13th State Assembly district election, 2012
Primary election
Party	Candidate	Votes	%
Democratic	Susan Eggman	21,066	39.8
Republican	K. "Jeffrey" Jafri	11,480	21.7
Republican	Dolores Cooper	7,892	14.9
Democratic	C. Jennet Stebbins	6,792	12.8
Democratic	Xochitl Raya Paderes	5,649	10.7
Total votes		52,879	100.0
General election
Democratic	Susan Eggman	78,776	65.4
Republican	K. "Jeffrey" Jafri	41,595	34.6
Total votes		120,371	100.0
Democratic win (new seat)			

=== District 14 ===
California's 14th State Assembly district election, 2012
Primary election
Party	Candidate	Votes	%
Democratic	Susan Bonilla (incumbent)	54,832	100.0
Total votes		54,832	100.0
General election
Democratic	Susan Bonilla (incumbent)	135,834	100.0
Total votes		135,834	100.0
Democratic hold			

=== District 15 ===
California's 15th State Assembly district election, 2012
Primary election
Party	Candidate	Votes	%
Democratic	Nancy Skinner (incumbent)	68,479	99.8
Peace and Freedom	Eugene Ruyle (write-in)	105	0.2
Total votes		68,584	100.0
General election
Democratic	Nancy Skinner (incumbent)	164,929	86.8
Peace and Freedom	Eugene Ruyle	25,167	13.2
Total votes		190,096	100.0
Democratic hold			

=== District 16 ===
California's 16th State Assembly district election, 2012
Primary election
Party	Candidate	Votes	%
Democratic	Joan Buchanan (incumbent)	54,368	56.7
Republican	Al Phillips	41,444	43.3
Total votes		95,812	100.0
General election
Democratic	Joan Buchanan (incumbent)	125,952	59.2
Republican	Al Phillips	86,803	40.8
Total votes		212,755	100.0
Democratic hold			

=== District 17 ===
California's 17th State Assembly district election, 2012
Primary election
Party	Candidate	Votes	%
Democratic	Tom Ammiano (incumbent)	63,454	84.2
Republican	Jason P. Clark	11,933	15.8
Total votes		75,387	100.0
General election
Democratic	Tom Ammiano (incumbent)	161,124	86.2
Republican	Jason P. Clark	25,728	13.8
Total votes		186,852	100.0
Democratic hold			

=== District 18 ===
California's 18th State Assembly district election, 2012
Primary election
Party	Candidate	Votes	%
Democratic	Rob Bonta	23,007	36.9
Democratic	Abel Guillen	18,521	29.7
Democratic	Joel Young	11,680	18.8
Republican	Rhonda Weber	9,082	14.6
Total votes		62,290	100.0
General election
Democratic	Rob Bonta	75,865	50.5
Democratic	Abel Guillen	74,422	49.5
Total votes		150,287	100.0
Democratic hold			

=== District 19 ===
California's 19th State Assembly district election, 2012
Primary election
Party	Candidate	Votes	%
Democratic	Phil Ting	38,432	56.4
Democratic	Michael Breyer	14,991	22.0
Republican	Matthew Del Carlo	11,646	17.1
Democratic	James Pan	3,075	4.5
Total votes		68,144	100.0
General election
Democratic	Phil Ting	92,858	58.4
Democratic	Michael Breyer	66,200	41.6
Total votes		159,058	100.0
Democratic hold			

=== District 20 ===
California's 20th State Assembly district election, 2012
Primary election
Party	Candidate	Votes	%
Democratic	Bill Quirk	17,177	30.3
Democratic	Jennifer Ong	14,560	25.7
No party preference	Mark Green	11,490	20.3
Republican	Luis Reynoso	10,041	17.7
Democratic	Sarabjit Kaur Cheema	3,397	6.0
Total votes		56,665	100.0
General election
Democratic	Bill Quirk	67,028	50.3
Democratic	Jennifer Ong	66,111	49.7
Total votes		133,139	100.0
Democratic hold			

=== District 21 ===
California's 21st State Assembly district election, 2012
Primary election
Party	Candidate	Votes	%
Republican	Jack Mobley	20,148	45.4
Democratic	Adam Gray	14,391	32.4
Democratic	Lesa Rasmussen	4,305	9.7
Democratic	Tommy Jones	4,055	9.1
Democratic	Robert R. Sellers	1,452	3.3
Total votes		44,351	100.0
General election
Democratic	Adam Gray	63,349	58.2
Republican	Jack Mobley	45,534	41.8
Total votes		108,883	100.0
Democratic win (new seat)			

=== District 22 ===
California's 22nd State Assembly district election, 2012
Primary election
Party	Candidate	Votes	%
Democratic	Kevin Mullin	51,578	68.5
Republican	Mark Gilham	23,738	31.5
Total votes		75,316	100.0
General election
Democratic	Kevin Mullin	126,519	71.4
Republican	Mark Gilham	50,684	28.6
Total votes		177,203	100.0
Democratic hold			

=== District 23 ===
California's 23rd State Assembly district election, 2012
Primary election
Party	Candidate	Votes	%
Republican	Jim Patterson	30,827	39.4
Republican	Bob Whalen	19,992	25.5
Democratic	Richard Rojas	17,690	22.6
Republican	Vong Mouanoutoua	5,487	7.0
Republican	David DeFrank	4,278	5.5
Total votes		78,274	100.0
General election
Republican	Jim Patterson	83,817	54.7
Republican	Bob Whalen	69,457	45.3
Total votes		153,274	100.0
Republican hold			

=== District 24 ===
California's 24th State Assembly district election, 2012
Primary election
Party	Candidate	Votes	%
Democratic	Rich Gordon (incumbent)	42,018	57.0
Republican	Chengzhi "George" Yang	20,949	28.4
Democratic	Geby E. Espinosa	7,654	10.4
No party preference	Joseph Antonelli Rosas	3,129	4.2
Total votes		73,750	100.0
General election
Democratic	Rich Gordon (incumbent)	118,120	70.4
Republican	Chengzhi "George" Yang	49,700	29.6
Total votes		167,820	100.0
Democratic hold			

=== District 25 ===
California's 25th State Assembly district election, 2012
Primary election
Party	Candidate	Votes	%
Democratic	Bob Wieckowski (incumbent)	22,112	41.6
Republican	ArLyne Diamond	16,077	30.2
Democratic	Pete "Primo" McHugh	14,970	28.2
Total votes		53,159	100.0
General election
Democratic	Bob Wieckowski (incumbent)	93,487	70.5
Republican	ArLyne Diamond	39,159	29.5
Total votes		132,646	100.0
Democratic hold			

=== District 26 ===
California's 26th State Assembly district election, 2012
Primary election
Party	Candidate	Votes	%
Republican	Connie Conway (incumbent)	34,299	71.8
Democratic	Jonathan Louis Sosa	12,627	28.2
Total votes		46,926	100.0
General election
Republican	Connie Conway (incumbent)	72,061	66.5
Democratic	Jonathan Louis Sosa	36,379	33.5
Total votes		108,440	100.0
Republican hold			

=== District 27 ===
California's 27th State Assembly district election, 2012
Primary election
Party	Candidate	Votes	%
Democratic	Nora Campos (incumbent)	34,217	70.6
Republican	Roger F. Lasson	14,238	29.4
Total votes		48,455	100.0
General election
Democratic	Nora Campos (incumbent)	91,816	77.6
Republican	Roger F. Lasson	26,461	22.4
Total votes		118,277	100.0
Democratic hold			

=== District 28 ===
California's 28th State Assembly district election, 2012
Primary election
Party	Candidate	Votes	%
Democratic	Paul Fong (incumbent)	43,965	54.3
No party preference	Chad Walsh	37,060	45.7
Total votes		81,025	100.0
General election
Democratic	Paul Fong (incumbent)	108,061	62.0
No party preference	Chad Walsh	66,239	38.0
Total votes		174,300	100.0
Democratic hold			

=== District 29 ===
California's 29th State Assembly district election, 2012
Primary election
Party	Candidate	Votes	%
Democratic	Mark Stone	52,471	54.0
Republican	Tom Walsh	31,476	32.4
Democratic	Bob Fultz	13,194	13.6
Total votes		97,141	100.0
General election
Democratic	Mark Stone	137,652	68.9
Republican	Tom Walsh	62,057	31.1
Total votes		199,709	100.0
Democratic hold			

=== District 30 ===
California's 30th State Assembly district election, 2012
Primary election
Party	Candidate	Votes	%
Democratic	Luis Alejo (incumbent)	29,136	58.7
Republican	Rob Bernosky	20,462	41.3
Total votes		49,598	100.0
General election
Democratic	Luis Alejo (incumbent)	79,141	65.4
Republican	Rob Bernosky	41,932	34.6
Total votes		121,073	100.0
Democratic hold			

=== District 31 ===
California's 31st State Assembly district election, 2012
Primary election
Party	Candidate	Votes	%
Democratic	Henry Perea (incumbent)	22,255	98.7
Republican	James (JD) Bennett (write-in)	299	1.3
Total votes		22,554	100.0
General election
Democratic	Henry Perea (incumbent)	55,626	64.0
Republican	James (JD) Bennett	31,282	36.0
Total votes		86,908	100.0
Democratic hold			

=== District 32 ===
California's 32nd State Assembly district election, 2012
Primary election
Party	Candidate	Votes	%
Democratic	Rudy Salas	13,053	41.4
Republican	Pedro A. Rios	7,550	23.9
Republican	Jon McQuiston	6,530	20.7
Republican	David Thomas	4,420	14.0
Total votes		31,553	100.0
General election
Democratic	Rudy Salas	38,759	52.9
Republican	Pedro A. Rios	34,476	47.1
Total votes		73,235	100.0
Democratic gain from Republican			

=== District 33 ===
California's 33rd State Assembly district election, 2012
Primary election
Party	Candidate	Votes	%
Republican	Tim Donnelly (incumbent)	25,200	52.1
Democratic	John Coffey	13,873	28.7
Republican	William E. "Bill" Jahn	9,331	19.3
Total votes		48,404	100.0
General election
Republican	Tim Donnelly (incumbent)	73,836	59.0
Democratic	John Coffey	51,215	41.0
Total votes		125,051	100.0
Republican hold			

=== District 34 ===
California's 34th State Assembly district election, 2012
Primary election
Party	Candidate	Votes	%
Republican	Shannon Grove (incumbent)	54,345	73.7
Democratic	Mari Goodman	19,369	26.3
Total votes		73,714	100.0
General election
Republican	Shannon Grove (incumbent)	106,384	69.2
Democratic	Mari Goodman	47,254	30.8
Total votes		153,638	100.0
Republican hold			

=== District 35 ===
California's 35th State Assembly district election, 2012
Primary election
Party	Candidate	Votes	%
Republican	Katcho Achadjian (incumbent)	62,747	64.9
Democratic	Gerald "Gerry" Manata	33,862	35.1
Total votes		96,609	100.0
General election
Republican	Katcho Achadjian (incumbent)	103,762	61.3
Democratic	Gerald "Gerry" Manata	65,500	38.7
Total votes		169,262	100.0
Republican hold			

=== District 36 ===
California's 36th State Assembly district election, 2012
Primary election
Party	Candidate	Votes	%
Republican	Ron Smith	15,097	35.1
Democratic	Steve Fox	14,160	32.9
Republican	Tom Lackey	13,795	32.0
Total votes		43,052	100.0
General election
Democratic	Steve Fox	66,005	50.1
Republican	Ron Smith	65,860	49.9
Total votes		131,865	100.0
Democratic gain from Republican			

=== District 37 ===
California's 37th State Assembly district election, 2012
Primary election
Party	Candidate	Votes	%
Democratic	Das Williams (incumbent)	52,400	56.3
Republican	Rob Walter	40,617	43.7
Total votes		93,017	100.0
General election
Democratic	Das Williams (incumbent)	115,532	60.4
Republican	Rob Walter	75,643	39.6
Total votes		191,175	100.0
Democratic hold			

=== District 38 ===
California's 38th State Assembly district election, 2012
Primary election
Party	Candidate	Votes	%
Republican	Scott Wilk	20,230	32.1
Democratic	Edward Headington	19,608	31.1
Republican	Patricia McKeon	14,025	22.2
Republican	Paul B. Strickland	9,182	14.6
Total votes		63,045	100.0
General election
Republican	Scott Wilk	100,069	56.9
Democratic	Edward Headington	75,864	43.1
Total votes		175,933	100.0
Republican hold			

=== District 39 ===
California's 39th State Assembly district election, 2012
Primary election
Party	Candidate	Votes	%
Democratic	Raul Bocanegra	11,521	36.2
Democratic	Richard Alarcón	8,567	26.9
Republican	Ricardo A. Benitez	5,037	15.8
Republican	Omar Cuevas	2,596	8.2
Green	John Paul (Jack) Lindblad	2,421	7.6
Republican	Margie Margarita Carranza	1,697	5.3
Democratic	Kevin J. Suscavage (write-in)	2	0.0
Total votes		31,841	100.0
General election
Democratic	Raul Bocanegra	62,612	58.4
Democratic	Richard Alarcón	44,624	41.6
Total votes		107,236	100.0
Democratic hold			

=== District 40 ===
California's 40th State Assembly district election, 2012
Primary election
Party	Candidate	Votes	%
Republican	Mike Morrell (incumbent)	26,261	58.2
Democratic	Russ Warner	18,862	41.8
Total votes		42,123	100.0
General election
Republican	Mike Morrell (incumbent)	65,282	50.4
Democratic	Russ Warner	64,264	49.6
Total votes		129,546	100.0
Republican hold			

=== District 41 ===
California's 41st State Assembly district election, 2012
Primary election
Party	Candidate	Votes	%
Democratic	Chris Holden	20,718	29.4
Republican	Donna Lowe	16,808	23.8
Republican	Ed Colton	12,399	17.6
Democratic	Michael Cacciotti	10,844	15.4
Democratic	Victoria Rusnak	9,727	13.8
Total votes		70,496	100.0
General election
Democratic	Chris Holden	109,743	57.7
Republican	Donna Lowe	80,362	42.3
Total votes		190,105	100.0
Democratic hold			

=== District 42 ===
California's 42nd State Assembly district election, 2012
Primary election
Party	Candidate	Votes	%
Republican	Brian Nestande (incumbent)	41,217	61.2
Democratic	Mark Anthony Orozco	26,107	38.8
Total votes		67,324	100.0
General election
Republican	Brian Nestande (incumbent)	81,768	54.7
Democratic	Mark Anthony Orozco	67,823	45.3
Total votes		149,591	100.0
Republican hold			

=== District 43 ===
California's 43rd State Assembly district election, 2012
Primary election
Party	Candidate	Votes	%
Democratic	Mike Gatto (incumbent)	26,397	55.7
Republican	Greg Krikorian	21,025	44.3
Total votes		47,422	100.0
General election
Democratic	Mike Gatto (incumbent)	95,673	60.2
Republican	Greg Krikorian	63,251	39.8
Total votes		158,924	100.0
Democratic hold			

=== District 44 ===
California's 44th State Assembly district election, 2012
Primary election
Party	Candidate	Votes	%
Republican	Jeff Gorell (incumbent)	38,263	58.1
Democratic	Eileen MacEnery	15,343	23.3
Democratic	Thomas Mullens	12,226	18.6
Total votes		65,832	100.0
General election
Republican	Jeff Gorell (incumbent)	86,132	52.9
Democratic	Eileen MacEnery	76,805	47.1
Total votes		162,937	100.0
Republican hold			

=== District 45 ===
California's 45th State Assembly district election, 2012
Primary election
Party	Candidate	Votes	%
Democratic	Bob Blumenfield (incumbent)	31,942	59.1
Republican	Chris Kolski	22,119	40.9
Total votes		54,061	100.0
General election
Democratic	Bob Blumenfield (incumbent)	100,422	63.4
Republican	Chris Kolski	57,996	36.6
Total votes		158,418	100.0
Democratic hold			

=== District 46 ===
California's 46th State Assembly district election, 2012
Primary election
Party	Candidate	Votes	%
Democratic	Adrin Nazarian	11,498	27.5
Republican	Jay L. Stern	8,401	20.1
Democratic	Brian C. Johnson	8,370	20.0
Democratic	Andrew B. Lachman	8,085	19.3
Democratic	Laurette Healey	4,502	10.8
Democratic	Adriano Lecaros	1,004	2.4
Total votes		41,860	100.0
General election
Democratic	Adrin Nazarian	92,870	71.0
Republican	Jay L. Stern	37,928	29.0
Total votes		130,798	100.0
Democratic win (new seat)			

=== District 47 ===
California's 47th State Assembly district election, 2012
Primary election
Party	Candidate	Votes	%
Democratic	Joe Baca, Jr.	11,033	42.3
Democratic	Cheryl Brown	7,566	29.0
Republican	Jeane Ensley	5,787	22.2
Republican	Thelma E. Beach	1,685	6.5
Total votes		26,071	100.0
General election
Democratic	Cheryl Brown	53,434	55.7
Democratic	Joe Baca, Jr.	42,475	44.3
Total votes		95,909	100.0
Democratic hold			

=== District 48 ===
California's 48th State Assembly district election, 2012
Primary election
Party	Candidate	Votes	%
Republican	Joe M. Gardner	15,344	45.6
Democratic	Roger Hernandez (incumbent)	14,625	43.4
No party preference	Mike Meza	3,698	11.0
Total votes		33,667	100.0
General election
Democratic	Roger Hernandez (incumbent)	74,642	59.4
Republican	Joe M. Gardner	50,927	40.6
Total votes		125,569	100.0
Democratic hold			

=== District 49 ===
California's 49th State Assembly district election, 2012
Primary election
Party	Candidate	Votes	%
Republican	Matthew Lin	20,549	52.2
Democratic	Ed Chau	13,746	34.9
Democratic	Mitchell Ing	5,074	12.9
Total votes		39,369	100.0
General election
Democratic	Ed Chau	64,791	56.4
Republican	Matthew Lin	50,153	43.6
Total votes		114,944	100.0
Democratic hold			

=== District 50 ===
California's 50th State Assembly district election, 2012
Primary election
Party	Candidate	Votes	%
Democratic	Betsy Butler (incumbent)	16,084	25.8
Democratic	Richard Bloom	15,947	25.6
Republican	Bradly S. Torgan	15,227	24.4
Democratic	Torie Osborn	15,155	24.3
Total votes		62,413	100.0
General election
Democratic	Richard Bloom	93,445	50.5
Democratic	Betsy Butler (incumbent)	91,740	49.5
Total votes		185,185	100.0
Democratic win (new seat)			

=== District 51 ===
California's 51st State Assembly district election, 2012
Primary election
Party	Candidate	Votes	%
Democratic	Jimmy Gomez	10,452	37.4
Democratic	Luis Lopez	6,871	24.6
Democratic	Arturo Chavez	6,422	23.0
Democratic	Richard Friedberg	3,059	11.0
Democratic	Oscar A. Guttierez	1,128	4.0
Total votes		27,932	100.0
General election
Democratic	Jimmy Gomez	63,292	59.8
Democratic	Luis Lopez	42,618	40.2
Total votes		105,910	100.0
Democratic hold			

=== District 52 ===
California's 52nd State Assembly district election, 2012
Primary election
Party	Candidate	Votes	%
Democratic	Norma Torres (incumbent)	10,851	41.8
Republican	Kenny Coble	9,729	37.5
Democratic	Paul Vincent Avila	3,417	13.2
Democratic	Ray Moors	1,969	7.6
Total votes		25,966	100.0
General election
Democratic	Norma Torres (incumbent)	66,565	66.0
Republican	Kenny Coble	34,267	34.0
Total votes		100,832	100.0
Democratic hold			

=== District 53 ===
California's 53rd State Assembly district election, 2012
Primary election
Party	Candidate	Votes	%
Democratic	John Pérez (incumbent)	10,051	58.5
Republican	Jose Trinidad Aguilar	2,889	16.8
Democratic	Michael "Mike" Aldapa	2,494	14.5
Democratic	Roger A. Young	1,738	10.1
Total votes		17,172	100.0
General election
Democratic	John Pérez (incumbent)	61,651	82.8
Republican	Jose Trinidad Aguilar	12,803	17.2
Total votes		74,454	100.0
Democratic hold			

=== District 54 ===
California's 54th State Assembly district election, 2012
Primary election
Party	Candidate	Votes	%
Democratic	Holly Mitchell (incumbent)	33,920	70.9
Republican	Keith Brandon McCowen	8,350	17.4
Democratic	Ed Nicoletti	5,601	11.7
Total votes		47,871	100.0
General election
Democratic	Holly Mitchell (incumbent)	143,530	83.3
Republican	Keith Brandon McCowen	28,688	16.7
Total votes		172,218	100.0
Democratic hold			

=== District 55 ===
California's 55th State Assembly district election, 2012
Primary election
Party	Candidate	Votes	%
Republican	Curt Hagman (incumbent)	40,268	69.1
Democratic	Gregg D. Fritchle	17,994	30.9
Total votes		58,262	100.0
General election
Republican	Curt Hagman (incumbent)	97,330	59.7
Democratic	Gregg D. Fritchle	65,652	40.3
Total votes		162,982	100.0
Republican hold			

=== District 56 ===
California's 56th State Assembly district election, 2012
Primary election
Party	Candidate	Votes	%
Democratic	V. Manuel Perez (incumbent)	23,661	57.1
Republican	Corky Reynaga-Emett	17,763	42.9
Total votes		41,424	100.0
General election
Democratic	V. Manuel Perez (incumbent)	66,353	66.1
Republican	Corky Reynaga-Emett	34,038	33.9
Total votes		100,391	100.0
Democratic hold			

=== District 57 ===
California's 57th State Assembly district election, 2012
Primary election
Party	Candidate	Votes	%
Republican	Noel A. Jaimes	17,025	43.8
Democratic	Ian Calderon	11,100	28.5
Democratic	Rudy Bermudez	10,763	27.7
Total votes		38,888	100.0
General election
Democratic	Ian Calderon	86,644	63.5
Republican	Noel A. Jaimes	49,832	36.5
Total votes		136,476	100.0
Democratic hold			

=== District 58 ===
California's 58th State Assembly district election, 2012
Primary election
Party	Candidate	Votes	%
Republican	Patricia A. Kotze-Ramos	9,015	28.1
Democratic	Cristina Garcia	8,517	26.6
Democratic	Tom Calderon	7,290	22.7
Democratic	Luis H. Marquez	3,946	12.3
Democratic	Daniel Crespo	2,096	6.5
Democratic	Sultan "Sam" Ahmad	1,197	3.7
Total votes		32,061	100.0
General election
Democratic	Cristina Garcia	91,019	71.8
Republican	Patricia A. Kotze-Ramos	35,676	28.2
Total votes		126,695	100.0
Democratic win (new seat)			

=== District 59 ===
California's 59th State Assembly district election, 2012
Primary election
Party	Candidate	Votes	%
Democratic	Reggie Jones-Sawyer	7,029	43.6
Democratic	Rodney D. Robinson	3,038	18.8
Democratic	Greg Akili	2,772	17.2
Democratic	Gertrude "Trudy" Holmes-Magee	2,487	15.4
Democratic	Armenak H. Nouridjanian	810	5.0
Total votes		16,136	100.0
General election
Democratic	Reggie Jones-Sawyer	40,519	52.3
Democratic	Rodney D. Robinson	36,949	47.7
Total votes		77,468	100.0
Democratic hold			

=== District 60 ===
California's 60th State Assembly district election, 2012
Primary election
Party	Candidate	Votes	%
Democratic	José Luis Pérez	11,411	32.4
Republican	Eric Linder	10,000	28.4
Republican	Stan Skipworth	7,058	20.0
Republican	Greg Kraft	6,749	19.2
Total votes		35,218	100.0
General election
Republican	Eric Linder	60,638	51.8
Democratic	José Luis Pérez	56,405	48.2
Total votes		117,043	100.0
Republican hold			

=== District 61 ===
California's 61st State Assembly district election, 2012
Primary election
Party	Candidate	Votes	%
Democratic	Jose Medina	17,473	44.6
Republican	Bill Batey	13,713	35.0
Republican	Joe Ludwig	6,254	15.9
No party preference	Fredy R. De Leon	1,757	4.5
Republican	Thomas Carlos Ketcham (write-in)	16	0.0
Total votes		39,213	100.0
General election
Democratic	Jose Medina	76,774	61.0
Republican	Bill Batey	49,003	39.0
Total votes		125,777	100.0
Democratic win (new seat)			

=== District 62 ===
California's 62nd State Assembly district election, 2012
Primary election
Party	Candidate	Votes	%
Democratic	Steven Bradford (incumbent)	25,446	75.3
Democratic	Mervin Evans	8,338	24.7
Total votes		33,784	100.0
General election
Democratic	Steven Bradford (incumbent)	98,047	72.1
Democratic	Mervin Evans	37,957	27.9
Total votes		136,004	100.0
Democratic hold			

=== District 63 ===
California's 63rd State Assembly district election, 2012
Primary election
Party	Candidate	Votes	%
Democratic	Anthony Rendon	8,776	38.0
Republican	Jack M. Guerrero	7,017	30.4
Democratic	Diane Janet Martinez	5,833	25.3
Democratic	Cathrin "Cat" Sargent	1,460	6.3
Total votes		23,086	100.0
General election
Democratic	Anthony Rendon	76,258	74.5
Republican	Jack M. Guerrero	26,093	25.5
Total votes		102,351	100.0
Democratic win (new seat)			

=== District 64 ===
California's 64th State Assembly district election, 2012
Primary election
Party	Candidate	Votes	%
Democratic	Isadore Hall, III (incumbent)	23,122	100.0
Total votes		23,122	100.0
General election
Democratic	Isadore Hall, III (incumbent)	100,446	100.0
Total votes		100,446	100.0
Democratic hold			

=== District 65 ===
California's 65th State Assembly district election, 2012
Primary election
Party	Candidate	Votes	%
Republican	Chris Norby (incumbent)	29,917	58.8
Democratic	Sharon Quirk-Silva	20,936	41.2
Total votes		50,853	100.0
General election
Democratic	Sharon Quirk-Silva	68,988	52.0
Republican	Chris Norby (incumbent)	63,576	48.0
Total votes		132,564	100.0
Democratic gain from Republican			

=== District 66 ===
California's 66th State Assembly district election, 2012
Primary election
Party	Candidate	Votes	%
Democratic	Al Muratsuchi	27,360	40.5
Republican	Craig Huey	26,298	38.9
Republican	Nathan Mintz	13,914	20.6
Total votes		67,572	100.0
General election
Democratic	Al Muratsuchi	102,136	54.8
Republican	Craig Huey	84,372	45.2
Total votes		186,508	100.0
Democratic win (new seat)			

=== District 67 ===
California's 67th State Assembly district election, 2012
Primary election
Party	Candidate	Votes	%
Republican	Phil Paule	11,951	27.7
Republican	Melissa Melendez	10,084	23.3
Republican	Bob Magee	8,672	20.1
Republican	Kenneth C. Dickson	8,216	19.0
Republican	William T. Akana	4,291	9.9
Total votes		43,214	100.0
General election
Republican	Melissa Melendez	67,232	52.3
Republican	Phil Paule	61,230	47.7
Total votes		128,462	100.0
Republican hold			

=== District 68 ===
California's 68th State Assembly district election, 2012
Primary election
Party	Candidate	Votes	%
Republican	Don Wagner (incumbent)	43,241	69.2
Democratic	Christina Avalos	19,254	30.8
Total votes		62,495	100.0
General election
Republican	Don Wagner (incumbent)	104,706	60.8
Democratic	Christina Avalos	67,448	39.2
Total votes		172,154	100.0
Republican hold			

=== District 69 ===
California's 69th State Assembly district election, 2012
Primary election
Party	Candidate	Votes	%
Democratic	Tom Daly	10,939	39.2
Republican	Jose "Joe" Moreno	5,980	21.4
Democratic	Julio Perez	5,738	20.6
Democratic	Michele Martinez	4,651	16.7
Democratic	Francisco "Paco" Barragan	605	2.2
Total votes		27,913	100.0
General election
Democratic	Tom Daly	56,951	67.6
Republican	Jose "Joe" Moreno	27,354	32.4
Total votes		84,305	100.0
Democratic hold			

=== District 70 ===
California's 70th State Assembly district election, 2012
Primary election
Party	Candidate	Votes	%
Democratic	Bonnie Lowenthal (incumbent)	29,082	58.6
Republican	Martha Flores Gibson	20,569	41.4
Total votes		49,651	100.0
General election
Democratic	Bonnie Lowenthal (incumbent)	100,676	65.8
Republican	Martha Flores Gibson	52,321	34.2
Total votes		152,997	100.0
Democratic hold			

=== District 71 ===
California's 71st State Assembly district election, 2012
Primary election
Party	Candidate	Votes	%
Republican	Brian Jones (incumbent)	36,424	46.7
Democratic	Patrick J. Hurley	23,510	30.2
Republican	John McLaughlin	17,987	23.1
Total votes		77,921	100.0
General election
Republican	Brian Jones (incumbent)	106,663	63.1
Democratic	Patrick J. Hurley	62,330	36.9
Total votes		168,993	100.0
Republican hold			

=== District 72 ===
California's 72nd State Assembly district election, 2012
Primary election
Party	Candidate	Votes	%
Republican	Troy Edgar	18,060	28.0
Republican	Travis Allen	12,851	19.9
Democratic	Joe Dovinh	12,432	19.3
Republican	Long Pham	12,409	19.2
Democratic	Albert Ayala	8,816	13.7
Total votes		64,568	100.0
General election
Republican	Travis Allen	79,110	55.7
Republican	Troy Edgar	62,983	44.3
Total votes		142,093	100.0
Republican hold			

=== District 73 ===
California's 73rd State Assembly district election, 2012
Primary election
Party	Candidate	Votes	%
Republican	Diane Harkey (incumbent)	49,992	70.2
Democratic	James Corbett	21,173	29.8
Total votes		71,165	100.0
General election
Republican	Diane Harkey (incumbent)	130,030	64.3
Democratic	James Corbett	72,196	35.7
Total votes		202,226	100.0
Republican hold			

=== District 74 ===
California's 74th State Assembly district election, 2012
Primary election
Party	Candidate	Votes	%
Republican	Allan Mansoor (incumbent)	33,319	43.5
Democratic	Robert Rush	25,120	32.8
Republican	Leslie Daigle	18,207	23.8
Total votes		76,646	100.0
General election
Republican	Allan Mansoor (incumbent)	110,190	56.6
Democratic	Robert Rush	84,520	43.4
Total votes		194,710	100.0
Republican hold			

=== District 75 ===
California's 75th State Assembly district election, 2012
Primary election
Party	Candidate	Votes	%
Republican	Marie Waldron	44,013	68.6
Democratic	Matthew Herold	20,180	31.4
Total votes		64,193	100.0
General election
Republican	Marie Waldron	98,686	62.7
Democratic	Matthew Herold	58,783	37.3
Total votes		157,469	100.0
Republican win (new seat)			

=== District 76 ===
California's 76th State Assembly district election, 2012
Primary election
Party	Candidate	Votes	%
Republican	Rocky Chavez	25,143	38.8
Republican	Sherry Hodges	21,100	32.6
Republican	Farrah Douglas	18,570	28.7
Total votes		64,813	100.0
General election
Republican	Rocky Chavez	88,295	58.2
Republican	Sherry Hodges	63,526	41.8
Total votes		151,821	100.0
Republican hold			

=== District 77 ===
California's 77th State Assembly district election, 2012
Primary election
Party	Candidate	Votes	%
Republican	Brian Maienschein	45,071	47.3
Democratic	Ruben "RJ" Hernandez	23,075	24.2
Republican	Dustin Steiner	14,406	15.1
No party preference	Greg Laskaris	12,639	13.3
Total votes		95,191	100.0
General election
Republican	Brian Maienschein	114,314	60.1
Democratic	Ruben "RJ" Hernandez	75,824	39.9
Total votes		190,138	100.0
Republican gain from Independent			

=== District 78 ===
California's 78th State Assembly district election, 2012
Primary election
Party	Candidate	Votes	%
Democratic	Toni Atkins (incumbent)	54,175	59.8
Republican	Ralph Denney	25,291	27.9
Republican	Robert E. Williams	11,121	12.3
Total votes		90,587	100.0
General election
Democratic	Toni Atkins (incumbent)	116,987	62.4
Republican	Ralph Denney	70,526	37.6
Total votes		187,513	100.0
Democratic hold			

=== District 79 ===
California's 79th State Assembly district election, 2012
Primary election
Party	Candidate	Votes	%
Democratic	Shirley Weber	20,293	30.5
Republican	Mary England	19,313	29.1
Republican	Matt Mendoza	8,857	13.3
Democratic	Rudy Ramirez	7,533	11.3
Democratic	Patricia Ann Washington	5,401	8.1
Democratic	Sid Voorakkara	5,060	7.6
Total votes		66,457	100.0
General election
Democratic	Shirley Weber	94,170	61.7
Republican	Mary England	58,424	38.3
Total votes		152,594	100.0
Democratic hold			

=== District 80 ===
California's 80th State Assembly district election, 2012
Primary election
Party	Candidate	Votes	%
Democratic	Ben Hueso (incumbent)	26,717	61.6
Republican	Derrick W. Roach	16,623	38.4
Total votes		43,340	100.0
General election
Democratic	Ben Hueso (incumbent)	76,225	69.6
Republican	Derrick W. Roach	33,260	30.4
Total votes		109,485	100.0
Democratic hold			
