= Jean Moorhead Duffy =

American politician

Member of the California State Assembly from the 5th district
- In office December 4, 1978 - November 30, 1986
- Preceded by: Eugene T. Gualco
- Succeeded by: Tim Leslie

Personal details
- Born: Jean Carol Macpherson; December 17, 1938 (age 87) Oakland, California
- Party: Republican (before 1981); Democratic (1981)
- Spouse(s): Ernest L. McElderry (m. 1960, divorced) George V. Moorhead (m. 1974; div. 1984) Gordon W. Duffy (m. 1985)
- Children: 4, including Lorna Jean Moorhead
- Education: University of California, Berkeley; Stanford University; San Jose State University

Jean Carol McElderry Moorhead Duffy (née Macpherson; born December 17, 1938) is a former lobbyist and politician from California and a member of the Democratic Party.

== Life ==
Moorhead was born Jean Carol Macpherson in Oakland, California, on December 17, 1938. She attended public schools in her hometown. She received her bachelor's degree in nursing (BSN) in 1961 from Stanford University. She later continued her education at San Jose State University, earning her M.S. in Public Health in 1971. She worked as a public health nurse for Santa Clara County Health Department, then part-time at a clinic for migrant farm workers in southern Santa Clara County, California.

== Family ==
She married Ernest L. McElderry in 1960. The couple had four children. She was married to George V. Moorhead from 1974 until 1984. In 1985, she married her onetime colleague, former assemblyman Gordon W. Duffy (R-Hanford). They remained married until his death on February 10, 2021.

== Political career ==
A lobbyist for the California Nurses Association (1976-78), Moorhead was first elected to the California State Assembly in 1978, representing the 5th district in the Sacramento suburbs, and won easy reelection in 1980 (against Democratic Sacramento County Supervisor Ted Sheedy). On February 19, 1981, in the middle of her second term, Moorhead changed her party affiliation from Republican to Democrat. She then went on to win reelection in 1982 rather comfortably. In 1984, however, Republican lobbyist Tim Leslie came within 1% of beating her. She chose not to seek reelection in 1986 and was succeeded by Leslie.

== Electoral history ==
Member, California State Assembly: 1979-1987
| Year | Office | Democrat | Votes | Pct | Republican | Votes | Pct |
|---|---|---|---|---|---|---|---|
| 1978 | California State Assembly; District 5 | Ben W. Franklin | 35,463 | 38.2% | Jean Moorhead | 57,485 | 61.8% |
| 1980 | California State Assembly; District 5 | Ted Sheedy | 52,121 | 40.7% | Jean Moorhead | 75,998 | 59.3% |
| 1982 | California State Assembly; District 5 | Jean Moorhead | 65,522 | 55.1% | Peggy Grenz | 48,810 | 41.1% |
| 1984 | California State Assembly; District 5 | Jean Moorhead | 70,450 | 49% | Tim Leslie | 69,071 | 48% |
