= Loomis, California =

City in California, United States

- Town in California
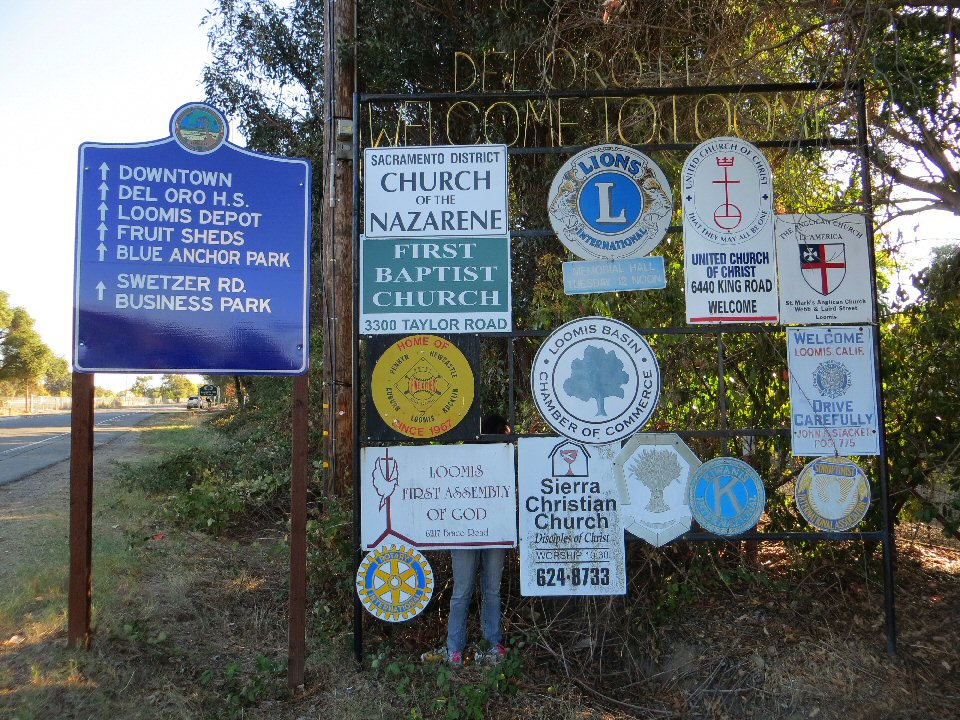
- Loomis entrance sign
- Motto: "A Small Town Is Like A Big Family"
- Interactive map of Loomis, California
- Location in California Location in the United States
- Coordinates: 38°48′59″N 121°11′34″W
- Country: United States
- State: California
- County: Placer
- Incorporated: December 17, 1984

Government
  - Type: Council–manager
  - Mayor: David Ring
  - State Senate: Roger Niello (R)
  - State Assembly: Joe Patterson (R)
  - U.S. Congress: Kevin Kiley (I)

Area
  - Total: 7.27 sq mi (18.82 km^{2})
  - Land: 7.27 sq mi (18.82 km^{2})
  - Water: 0 sq mi (0.00 km^{2}) 0%
- Elevation: 404 ft (123 m)

Population (2020)
  - Total: 6,836
  - Density: 944.9/sq mi (364.82/km^{2})
- Time zone: UTC-8 (PST)
  - Summer (DST): UTC-7 (PDT)
- ZIP code: 95650
- Area codes: 916, 279
- FIPS code: 06-43140
- GNIS feature ID: 0277546
- Website: loomis.ca.gov

Loomis (formerly Pine, Pino, Smithville, and Placer) is an incorporated town in Placer County, California, United States. It is part of the Sacramento metropolitan area. The town's population was reported as 6,836 in the 2020 census. It shares borders with the city of Rocklin and the Census-Designated Places Penryn and Granite Bay.

== History ==
The Placer post office opened on the site in 1861, changed its name to Smithville in 1862, then changed it to Pino in 1869, and in 1890 the Southern Pacific Railroad finally decided on Loomis. The railroad and Post Office found that Pino was confused with the town of Reno, hence the name change to Loomis. The name Smithville honors L.G. Smith, who was one of the town's most prominent leaders.

Loomis takes its name from one of the town's pioneers, James Loomis. At one time, James Loomis was the whole town—saloon keeper, railroad agent, express agent, and postmaster. In the early part of the 20th century, Loomis was the second largest fruit-shipping station in Placer County, Newcastle California, just 6 mi (9.7 km) east of Loomis, was considered the largest.

Loomis remained part of unincorporated Placer County until December 17, 1984, when the Town of Loomis officially incorporated. The Town was in danger of being annexed by its neighbor Rocklin and the residents voted to incorporate to preserve local control, partly on the issue of preserving the "small town" character and historic structures such as the High Hand and Blue Goose fruit packing sheds which sit between Taylor Road (a segment of historic Highway 40) and the Union Pacific railroad tracks.

== Geography ==
According to the United States Census Bureau, the town has a total area of 7.27 square miles (18.8 km^{2}), all land. Stream drainages in Loomis are Antelope Creek and Secret Ravine.

== Climate ==
Loomis has a hot-summer Mediterranean climate (Köppen Csa) that is characterized by cool, wet winters and hot, dry summers. As with the rest of cities in the northern Central Valley, Loomis has hot summers with sparse rainfall and abundant sunshine. Winters are cool and bring plenty of rain. Average daily high temperatures range from 53 °F (12 °C) in January to 94 °F (34 °C) in July with August remaining nearly as hot. Daily low temperatures range from 39 °F in winter to 61 °F in summer (4 to 16 °C). Snowfall is almost non-existent in Loomis.

Climate data for Loomis, California
Month	Jan	Feb	Mar	Apr	May	Jun	Jul	Aug	Sep	Oct	Nov	Dec	Year
Record high °F (°C)	75 (24)	78 (26)	86 (30)	98 (37)	107 (42)	110 (43)	115 (46)	110 (43)	111 (44)	102 (39)	87 (31)	76 (24)	115 (46)
Mean daily maximum °F (°C)	53 (12)	60 (16)	64 (18)	71 (22)	80 (27)	88 (31)	94 (34)	92 (33)	87 (31)	77 (25)	63 (17)	54 (12)	74 (23)
Daily mean °F (°C)	46 (8)	51 (11)	54 (12)	60 (16)	66 (19)	73 (23)	78 (26)	76 (24)	73 (23)	65 (18)	54 (12)	47 (8)	62 (17)
Mean daily minimum °F (°C)	39 (4)	42 (6)	44 (7)	48 (9)	53 (12)	58 (14)	61 (16)	61 (16)	58 (14)	52 (11)	44 (7)	39 (4)	50 (10)
Record low °F (°C)	21 (−6)	23 (−5)	27 (−3)	33 (1)	36 (2)	43 (6)	48 (9)	46 (8)	41 (5)	31 (−1)	27 (−3)	16 (−9)	16 (−9)
Average precipitation inches (mm)	3.98 (101)	3.46 (88)	3.07 (78)	1.58 (40)	0.58 (15)	0.12 (3.0)	0.04 (1.0)	0.06 (1.5)	0.35 (8.9)	1.08 (27)	2.80 (71)	3.33 (85)	20.45 (519.4)
Source: http://www.myforecast.com/bin/climate.m?city=11897&zip_code=95648&metric=false

== Demographics ==
Historical population
Census	Pop.	Note	%±
1970	1,108		—
1980	1,284		15.9%
1990	5,705		344.3%
2000	6,260		9.7%
2010	6,430		2.7%
2020	6,836		6.3%
U.S. Decennial Census

=== 2020 census ===
As of the 2020 census, Loomis had a population of 6,836 and a population density of 940.8 inhabitants per square mile (363.2/km^{2}). The median age was 42.3 years. 23.9% of residents were under the age of 18, 8.1% were aged 18 to 24, 21.0% were aged 25 to 44, 28.8% were aged 45 to 64, and 18.2% were 65 years of age or older. For every 100 females, there were 97.2 males, and for every 100 females age 18 and over there were 94.0 males age 18 and over.

The census reported that 99.3% of the population lived in households, 3 people (0.0%) lived in non-institutionalized group quarters, and 43 people (0.6%) were institutionalized. There were 2,459 households in Loomis, of which 35.9% had children under the age of 18 living in them. Of all households, 57.3% were married-couple households, 5.4% were cohabiting-couple households, 14.3% were households with a male householder and no spouse or partner present, and 23.0% were households with a female householder and no spouse or partner present. About 18.4% of all households were made up of individuals, and 9.6% had someone living alone who was 65 years of age or older. The average household size was 2.76, and there were 1,875 families (76.3% of all households).

There were 2,548 housing units, of which 2,459 (96.5%) were occupied and 3.5% were vacant. Of occupied units, 78.2% were owner-occupied and 21.8% were occupied by renters. The homeowner vacancy rate was 0.9% and the rental vacancy rate was 3.6%.

88.3% of residents lived in urban areas, while 11.7% lived in rural areas.

Racial composition as of the 2020 census
Race	Number	Percent
White	5,521	80.8%
Black or African American	33	0.5%
American Indian and Alaska Native	87	1.3%
Asian	236	3.5%
Native Hawaiian and Other Pacific Islander	3	0.0%
Some other race	236	3.5%
Two or more races	720	10.5%
Hispanic or Latino (of any race)	808	11.8%

=== Demographic estimates ===
In 2023, the US Census Bureau estimated that 1.5% of the population were foreign-born. Of all people aged 5 or older, 94.8% spoke only English at home, 3.5% spoke Spanish, 1.0% spoke other Indo-European languages, 0.0% spoke Asian or Pacific Islander languages, and 0.7% spoke other languages. Of those aged 25 or older, 94.8% were high school graduates and 41.2% had a bachelor's degree.

=== Income and poverty ===
The median household income in 2023 was $103,435, and the per capita income was $66,049. About 5.0% of families and 10.8% of the population were below the poverty line.

=== 2010 census ===
At the 2010 census Loomis had a population of 6,430. The population density was 884.8 inhabitants per square mile (341.6/km^{2}). The racial makeup of Loomis was 5,733 (89.2%) White, 33 (0.5%) African American, 74 (1.2%) Native American, 169 (2.6%) Asian, 12 (0.2%) Pacific Islander, 149 (2.3%) from other races, and 260 (4.0%) from two or more races. Hispanic or Latino of any race were 568 people (8.8%).

The census reported that 6,409 people (99.7% of the population) lived in households, 5 (0.1%) lived in non-institutionalized group quarters, and 16 (0.2%) were institutionalized.

There were 2,356 households, 832 (35.3%) had children under the age of 18 living in them, 1,361 (57.8%) were opposite-sex married couples living together, 266 (11.3%) had a female householder with no husband present, 138 (5.9%) had a male householder with no wife present. There were 142 (6.0%) unmarried opposite-sex partnerships, and 16 (0.7%) same-sex married couples or partnerships. 453 households (19.2%) were one person and 194 (8.2%) had someone living alone who was 65 or older. The average household size was 2.72. There were 1,765 families (74.9% of households); the average family size was 3.10.

The age distribution was 1,588 people (24.7%) under the age of 18, 510 people (7.9%) aged 18 to 24, 1,377 people (21.4%) aged 25 to 44, 2,121 people (33.0%) aged 45 to 64, and 834 people (13.0%) who were 65 or older. The median age was 42.1 years. For every 100 females, there were 97.8 males. For every 100 females age 18 and over, there were 92.8 males.

There were 2,465 housing units at an average density of 339.2 per square mile, of the occupied units 1,830 (77.7%) were owner-occupied and 526 (22.3%) were rented. The homeowner vacancy rate was 1.2%; the rental vacancy rate was 4.9%. 4,911 people (76.4% of the population) lived in owner-occupied housing units and 1,498 people (23.3%) lived in rental housing units.

== Culture ==
The biggest event in Loomis is the Fruit Shed Festival (formerly the Eggplant Festival) which offers entertainment, arts and crafts, food, and children's activities. 2012 was the 25th anniversary of the Eggplant Festival. Smaller festivities include the Loomis Friday Night Family Fest during summer and the Cowpoke Fall Gathering.

== Economy ==
As of May 2019 Loomis was estimated to have a civilian workforce of 3,793 representing 59% of the total population. Approximately 30.1% of the population has a bachelor's degree or higher.

The median household income was estimated to be $75,691 in 2017 with a per capita income of $38,415. An estimated 7.6% of the population were considered persons in poverty.

In 2012, Loomis had 835 registered businesses. 454 were considered men-owned, 153 were considered woman-owned, 133 were considered minority-owned, and 150 were considered veteran-owned.

== Education ==
Loomis is home to Del Oro High School. Foundation elementary schools for Del Oro High School are Placer Elementary School, Franklin Elementary School, Loomis Grammar School, H. Clarke Powers Elementary School, Penryn School, Ophir STEAM Academy, Newcastle School, and Loomis Basin Charter School.

== Transportation ==
Placer County Transit provides weekday commuter service to/from the Penryn Park and Ride to/from Downtown Sacramento.

Loomis is bisected by Interstate 80.

== Notable people ==
- Taylor Lewan, offensive tackle for the Tennessee Titans.
- Hobo Johnson, vocalist and front man of Hobo Johnson and the LoveMakers.
- Alex Obert, Current captain of Team USA's Water Polo team, competed in the 2016 Summer Olympics.
- Randy Fasani – former NFL quarterback
- James Irvin – professional MMA fighter
- Mark McLemore – MLB pitcher for Minnesota Twins
- Don Verlin – men's basketball head coach at University of Idaho
- Sally Edwards – member of Triathlon Hall of Fame
- Hiroshi Kashiwagi - writer, playwright and actor
- Thomas E. Cooper – former Assistant Secretary of the Air Force through 1987
- Michael Anton – conservative essayist and former deputy assistant to the president for strategic communications
- Jack Wood - driver in the NASCAR Camping World Truck Series for GMS Racing
- Dean S. Laird -U.S. World War II flying ace
- Maxxine Dupri -WWE wrestler
