= California's 6th senatorial district =

American legislative district

California's 6th State Senate district
Current senator
Roger Niello; R–Fair Oaks
- Population (2010) • Voting age • Citizen voting age: 936,301; 692,040; 599,719
- Demographics: 38.66% White; 13.12% Black; 24.78% Latino; 19.08% Asian; 1.07% Native American; 1.30% Hawaiian/Pacific Islander; 0.31% other; 1.68% remainder of multiracial
- Registered voters: 599,719
- Registration: 36.10% Republican; 35.56% Democratic; 19.89% No party preference

California's 6th senatorial district is one of 40 California State Senate districts. It is currently represented by Republican Roger Niello of Fair Oaks.

== District profile ==
The district encompasses the northern and eastern suburbs of the Sacramento metropolitan area, including the Sacramento County cities and unincorporated communities of Galt, Rancho Murieta, Rancho Cordova, Carmichael, Fair Oaks, Gold River, Arden-Arcade, Folsom, Orangevale, Citrus Heights, and Antelope; and the western Placer County exurbs of Granite Bay, Roseville, Rocklin, Loomis, Whitney, and Lincoln.

== Election results from statewide races ==
Year	Office	Results
2020	President	Biden 68.9 – 28.6%
2018	Governor	Newsom 66.9 – 33.1%
2018	Senator	Feinstein 56.1 – 43.9%
2016	President	Clinton 67.3 – 26.3%
2016	Senator	Harris 67.2 – 32.8%
2014	Governor	Brown 69.9 – 30.1%
2012	President	Obama 66.1 – 31.4%
2012	Senator	Feinstein 68.5 – 31.5%

Election results from statewide races
Year	Office	Results
2002	Governor	Davis 46.0 - 40.2%
2000	President	Gore 50.6 - 43.9%
2000	Senator	Feinstein 55.4 - 37.3%
1998	Governor	Davis 58.6 - 38.5%
1998	Senator	Boxer 51.9 - 44.4%
1996	President	Clinton 51.2 - 39.3%
1994	Governor	Wilson 53.1 - 42.8%
1994	Senator	Feinstein 49.1 - 42.6%
1992	President	Clinton 45.0 - 34.0%
1992	Senator	Boxer 50.5 - 39.5%
1992	Senator	Feinstein 55.0 - 38.7%

== List of senators representing the district ==
Due to redistricting, the 6th district has been moved around different parts of the state. The current iteration resulted from the 2021 redistricting by the California Citizens Redistricting Commission.

Senators	Party	Years served	Counties represented	Notes
William J. Hill	Republican/Workingmen’s	January 5, 1880 – January 8, 1883	Monterey, San Benito, Santa Cruz	
Benjamin Knight	Democratic	January 8, 1883 – January 3, 1887	Monterey, San Benito, Santa Cruz	
Archibald Yell		January 3, 1887 – January 5, 1891	Lake, Mendocino	
John Henry Seawell		January 5, 1891 – January 7, 1895	Colusa, Glenn, Mendocino	
Eugene W. Aram	Republican	January 7, 1895 – January 2, 1899	Sutter, Yolo, Yuba	
William M. Cutter	Republican	January 2, 1899 – January 5, 1903	Sutter, Yolo, Yuba	
Marshall Diggs	Democratic	January 5, 1903 – January 7, 1907	Butte, Sutter, Yolo, Yuba	
Albert E. Boynton	Republican	January 7, 1907 – January 4, 1915	Butte, Sutter, Yolo, Yuba	
William Erskine Duncan, Jr.	Democratic	January 4, 1915 – January 8, 1923	Butte, Sutter, Yolo, Yuba	
William F. Gates	Republican	January 8, 1923 – January 3, 1927	Butte, Sutter, Yolo, Yuba	
Raymond Henry Jones	Republican	January 3, 1927 – January 5, 1931	Butte, Sutter, Yolo, Yuba	
Charles H. Deuel	Democratic	January 5, 1931 – July 22, 1947	Butte	Died in office.
Vacant		July 22, 1947 – November 17, 1947	Butte	
Harry E. Drobish	Nonpartisan	November 17, 1947 – January 8, 1951	Butte	Sworn in after winning special election.
Paul L. Byrne	Republican	January 8, 1951 – August 28, 1962	Butte	Died in office. Died from acute heart attack.
Vacant		August 28, 1962 – January 7, 1963	Butte	
Stan Pittman	Republican	January 7, 1963 – January 2, 1967	Butte	
Alan Short	Democratic	January 2, 1967 – December 2, 1974	San Joaquin, Sacramento	
George Moscone	Democratic	December 2, 1974 – January 8, 1976	San Francisco, San Mateo	Resigned from the Senate.
Vacant		January 8, 1976 – July 1, 1976	San Francisco, San Mateo	
John Francis Foran	Democratic	July 1, 1976 – November 30, 1982	San Francisco, San Mateo	Sworn in after winning special election.
Leroy F. Greene	Democratic	December 6, 1982 – November 30, 1998	Sacramento	
Deborah Ortiz	Democratic	December 7, 1998 – November 30, 2006	Sacramento	
Darrell Steinberg	Democratic	December 4, 2006 – November 30, 2014	Sacramento	
Richard Pan	Democratic	December 1, 2014 – November 30, 2022	Sacramento, Yolo	
Roger Niello	Republican	December 5, 2022 – present	Placer, Sacramento	

== Election results (1990-present) ==
=== 2022 ===
2022 California State Senate 6th district election
Primary election
Party	Candidate	Votes	%
Democratic	Paula Villescaz	105,719	43.1
Republican	Roger Niello	104,883	42.8
Republican	Michael J. Huang	34,604	14.1
Total votes		245,206	100.0
General election
Republican	Roger Niello	202,569	55.7
Democratic	Paula Villescaz	160,846	44.3
Total votes		363,415	100.0
Republican gain from Democratic			

=== 2018 ===
2018 California State Senate 6th district election
Primary election
Party	Candidate	Votes	%
Democratic	Richard Pan (incumbent)	109,907	65.7
No party preference	Eric Frame	22,062	13.2
Libertarian	Janine DeRose	18,308	10.9
Democratic	Jacob Mason	16,458	9.8
Republican	Austin Bennett (write-in)	530	0.3
Total votes		167,238	100.0
General election
Democratic	Richard Pan (incumbent)	212,903	69.5
No party preference	Eric Frame	93,217	30.5
Total votes		306,120	100.0
Democratic hold			

=== 2014 ===
2014 California State Senate 6th district election
Primary election
Party	Candidate	Votes	%
Democratic	Roger Dickinson	48,668	40.3
Democratic	Richard Pan	37,552	31.1
Republican	James Axelgard	19,258	15.9
Republican	Jonathan Zachariou	15,355	12.7
Total votes		120,833	100.0
General election
Democratic	Richard Pan	96,688	53.8
Democratic	Roger Dickinson	82,938	46.2
Total votes		179,626	100.0
Democratic hold			

=== 2010 ===
2010 California State Senate 6th district election
Party	Candidate	Votes	%
Democratic	Darrell Steinberg (incumbent)	137,012	61.0
Republican	Marcel Weiland	70,724	31.5
Libertarian	Steve Torno	11,236	4.9
Peace and Freedom	Lanric Hyland	5,916	2.6
Total votes		224,888	100.0
Democratic hold			

=== 2006 ===
2006 California State Senate 6th district election
Party	Candidate	Votes	%
Democratic	Darrell Steinberg	115,628	58.7
Republican	Paul Green	71,051	36.1
Peace and Freedom	C. T. Weber	5,573	2.8
Libertarian	Alana Garberoglio	4,774	2.4
Total votes		197,026	100.0
Democratic hold			

=== 2002 ===
2002 California State Senate 6th district election
Party	Candidate	Votes	%
Democratic	Deborah Ortiz (incumbent)	122,126	70.7
Republican	Jason A. Sewell	44,972	26.0
No party	Yolanda Knaak (write-in)	5,635	3.3
Total votes		172,733	100.0
Democratic hold			

=== 1998 ===
1998 California State Senate 6th district election
Party	Candidate	Votes	%
Democratic	Deborah Ortiz	128,949	55.2
Republican	Chris Quackenbush	96,227	41.2
Libertarian	Gerald Klass	8,244	3.5
Total votes		233,420	100.0
Democratic hold			

=== 1994 ===
1994 California State Senate 6th district election
Party	Candidate	Votes	%
Democratic	Leroy F. Greene (incumbent)	125,138	53.7
Republican	Dave Cox	107,853	46.3
Total votes		232,991	100.0
Democratic hold			

=== 1990 ===
1990 California State Senate 6th district election
Party	Candidate	Votes	%
Democratic	Leroy F. Greene (incumbent)	126,827	53.7
Republican	Joe Sullivan	95,380	40.4
Libertarian	Lawrence "Larry" R. Murray	13,835	5.9
Total votes		236,042	100.0
Democratic hold			

== See also ==
- California State Senate
- California State Senate districts
- Districts in California
