= Gold River, California =

Gold River
- Census-designated place
- Location in Sacramento County and the state of California
- Coordinates: 38°37′24″N 121°14′52″W
- Country: United States
- State: California
- County: Sacramento

Area
  - Total: 2.740 sq mi (7.10 km^{2})
  - Land: 2.658 sq mi (6.88 km^{2})
  - Water: 0.082 sq mi (0.21 km^{2}) 3.00%
- Elevation: 121 ft (37 m)

Population (2020)
  - Total: 7,844
  - Density: 2,951/sq mi (1,139/km^{2})
- Time zone: UTC-8 (Pacific)
  - Summer (DST): UTC-7 (PDT)
- ZIP code: 95670
- Area code: 916, 279
- FIPS code: 06-30345
- GNIS feature IDs: 1853391, 2408305

Gold River is a census-designated place (CDP) in Sacramento County, California, United States. The population was 7,844 at the 2020 census, down from 7,912 at the 2010 census. Gold River is part of the Sacramento-Arden-Arcade-Roseville Metropolitan Statistical Area. With a median family income of $141,399 according to U.S. Census Bureau in 2021, Gold River is the highest-income community in Sacramento County.

The community of Gold River consists of a residential planned development and some smaller subdivisions served by the Gold River Discovery Center (a K through 8 school), as well as some retail, commercial and light industrial areas. The community consists of detached single family homes, duplex and triplexes, as well as a condominium development. Gold River lies between the cities of Rancho Cordova on the south and west, Folsom on the east, and the American River to the north. The Gold River Community Association is the master association for the 25 separate "villages" that make up the planned development. Each village has its own subassociations as well. The planned development and two subdivisions, including Gold Station, opted out of inclusion into the City of Rancho Cordova by resolution and petitions, respectively. The community remains an unincorporated part of Sacramento County.

== Geography ==
Gold River is located at 38°37′24″N 121°14′52″W (38.623392, -121.247845).

According to the United States Census Bureau, the CDP has a total area of 2.7 square miles (7.0 km^{2}), of which, 2.7 square miles (7.0 km^{2}) of it is land and 0.1 square miles (0.26 km^{2}) of it (3.00%) is water.

== Demographics ==
Historical population
| Census | Pop. | Note | %± |
|---|---|---|---|
| 2000 | 8,023 | | — |
| 2010 | 7,912 | | −1.4% |
| 2020 | 7,844 | | −0.9% |
U.S. Decennial Census; 2000 2010

Gold River first appeared as a census designated place in the 2000 U.S. census.

=== 2020 census ===
As of the 2020 census, Gold River had a population of 7,844. The population density was 2,951.1 inhabitants per square mile (1,139.4/km^{2}). The median age was 56.1 years. The age distribution was 15.0% under the age of 18, 5.3% aged 18 to 24, 16.3% aged 25 to 44, 30.0% aged 45 to 64, and 33.3% who were 65 years of age or older. For every 100 females there were 91.5 males, and for every 100 females age 18 and over there were 91.1 males age 18 and over.

99.0% of residents lived in urban areas, while 1.0% lived in rural areas.

Racial composition as of the 2020 census
| Race | Number | Percent |
|---|---|---|
| White | 5,223 | 66.6% |
| Black or African American | 202 | 2.6% |
| American Indian and Alaska Native | 26 | 0.3% |
| Asian | 1,443 | 18.4% |
| Native Hawaiian and Other Pacific Islander | 24 | 0.3% |
| Some other race | 200 | 2.5% |
| Two or more races | 726 | 9.3% |
| Hispanic or Latino (of any race) | 657 | 8.4% |

The Census reported that the whole population lived in households. There were 3,486 households in Gold River, of which 20.1% had children under the age of 18 living in them. Of all households, 58.5% were married-couple households, 4.5% were cohabiting-couple households, 13.1% were households with a male householder and no spouse or partner present, and 23.9% were households with a female householder and no spouse or partner present. About 26.4% of all households were made up of individuals and 17.9% had someone living alone who was 65 years of age or older. The average household size was 2.25. There were 2,402 families (68.9% of all households).

There were 3,579 housing units at an average density of 1,346.5 units per square mile (519.9 units/km^{2}), of which 3,486 (97.4%) were occupied. Of these, 81.9% were owner-occupied and 18.1% were occupied by renters. The homeowner vacancy rate was 0.6% and the rental vacancy rate was 5.4%.

=== Demographic estimates ===
In 2023, the US Census Bureau estimated that 17.1% of the population were foreign-born. Of all people aged 5 or older, 79.9% spoke only English at home, 3.8% spoke Spanish, 7.5% spoke other Indo-European languages, 7.5% spoke Asian or Pacific Islander languages, and 1.2% spoke other languages. Of those aged 25 or older, 98.1% were high school graduates and 64.7% had a bachelor's degree.

=== Income and poverty ===
The median household income was $166,250, and the per capita income was $88,566. About 1.6% of families and 2.0% of the population were below the poverty line.

=== 2010 census ===
The 2010 United States census reported that Gold River had a population of 7,912. The population density was 2,907.4 inhabitants per square mile (1,122.6/km^{2}). The racial makeup of Gold River was 5,837 (73.8%) White, 195 (2.5%) African American, 20 (0.3%) Native American, 1,426 (18.0%) Asian, 28 (0.4%) Pacific Islander, 97 (1.2%) from other races, and 309 (3.9%) from two or more races. Hispanic or Latino of any race were 515 persons (6.5%).

The Census reported that 7,912 people (100% of the population) lived in households, 0 (0%) lived in non-institutionalized group quarters, and 0 (0%) were institutionalized.

There were 3,335 households, out of which 912 (27.3%) had children under the age of 18 living in them, 2,045 (61.3%) were opposite-sex married couples living together, 218 (6.5%) had a female householder with no husband present, 98 (2.9%) had a male householder with no wife present. There were 92 (2.8%) unmarried opposite-sex partnerships, and 30 (0.9%) same-sex married couples or partnerships. 815 households (24.4%) were made up of individuals, and 420 (12.6%) had someone living alone who was 65 years of age or older. The average household size was 2.37. There were 2,361 families (70.8% of all households); the average family size was 2.83.

The population was spread out, with 1,583 people (20.0%) under the age of 18, 444 people (5.6%) aged 18 to 24, 1,304 people (16.5%) aged 25 to 44, 3,024 people (38.2%) aged 45 to 64, and 1,557 people (19.7%) who were 65 years of age or older. The median age was 49.7 years. For every 100 females, there were 90.9 males. For every 100 females age 18 and over, there were 87.4 males.

There were 3,505 housing units at an average density of 1,288.0 per square mile (497.3/km^{2}), of which 2,787 (83.6%) were owner-occupied, and 548 (16.4%) were occupied by renters. The homeowner vacancy rate was 1.4%; the rental vacancy rate was 10.7%. 6,665 people (84.2% of the population) lived in owner-occupied housing units and 1,247 people (15.8%) lived in rental housing units.

== Government ==
In the California State Legislature, Gold River is the 6th senatorial district, represented by Republican Roger Niello, and in the 7th Assembly district, represented by Republican Josh Hoover.

In the United States House of Representatives, Gold River is in California's 6th congressional district, represented by Democrat Ami Bera.

== Notable residents ==
- Ricky Jordan, former first baseman for the Philadelphia Phillies.
- Dan Lungren, former 3rd district Congressman, former California Attorney General, 1998 Republican gubernatorial nominee
- Roberta MacGlashan, Sacramento County Supervisor
- Chris Sullivan, American actor and musician - Toby Damon This Is Us and Taserface Guardians of the Galaxy Vol. 2
