= California's 5th State Assembly district =

American legislative district

Current assemblymember
Joe Patterson; R–Rocklin
- Population: 497,826
- Demographics: 68.3% White; 1.5% Black; 14.3% Latino; 8.3% Asian; 0.5% Native American; 0.2% Hawaiian/Pacific Islander; 0.5% other; 6.3% remainder of multiracial
- Registration: 41.45% Republican; 31.03% Democratic; 21.02% No party preference

California's 5th State Assembly district is one of 80 California State Assembly districts. It is currently represented by Republican Joe Patterson of Rocklin.

== District profile ==
The district encompasses the majority of the populations of both Placer and El Dorado Counties in the Sierra foothills.

El Dorado County

- Cameron Park
- Coloma
- El Dorado Hills
- Georgetown
- Placerville
- Shingle Springs

Placer County

- Auburn
- Granite Bay
- Lincoln
- Loomis
- Newcastle
- Penryn
- Rocklin
- Roseville

== Election results from statewide races ==
Year	Office	Results
2024	President	Trump 53.9 - 43.2%
2021	Recall	Yes 61.7 – 38.3%
2020	President	Trump 55.3 - 42.2%
2018	Governor	Cox 60.2 – 39.8%
2018	Senator	de Leon 56.8 – 43.2%
2016	President	Trump 54.8 – 38.5%
2016	Senator	Harris 60.4 – 39.6%
2014	Governor	Kashkari 55.9 – 44.1%
2012	President	Romney 55.9 – 41.3%
2012	Senator	Emken 57.4 – 42.6%

== List of assembly members representing the district ==
Due to redistricting, the 5th district has been moved around different parts of the state. The current iteration resulted from the 2021 redistricting by the California Citizens Redistricting Commission.

Assembly members	Party	Years served	Counties represented	Notes
Thomas A. Roseberry	Republican	January 5, 1885 – January 3, 1887	Lassen, Modoc	
William Dudley Morris	Democratic	January 3, 1887 – January 7, 1889	Lassen, Modoc	
J. J. Reavis	Democratic	January 7, 1889 – January 5, 1891	Lassen, Modoc	
A. J. Jackson	Democratic	January 5, 1891 – January 2, 1893	Lassen, Modoc	
Thaddeus Wilton Huff Shanahan	Democratic	January 2, 1893 – January 7, 1895	Modoc, Shasta	
James T. Laird	Republican	January 7, 1895 – January 4, 1897	Modoc, Shasta	
Thaddeus Wilton Huff Shanahan	Populist	January 4, 1897 – January 2, 1899	Modoc, Shasta	
James H. Beecher	Republican	January 2, 1899 – January 5, 1901	Modoc, Shasta	
James A. Hubbard	Democratic	January 5, 1901 – January 5, 1903	Modoc, Shasta	
Frank D. Soward	Republican	January 5, 1903 – January 2, 1905	Plumas, Sierra, Tehama	
H. S. Gans	Republican	January 2, 1905 – January 7, 1907	Plumas, Sierra, Tehama	
John W. Finney	Republican	January 7, 1907 – January 4, 1909	Plumas, Sierra, Tehama	
Harry Polsley	Democratic	January 4, 1909 – January 4, 1915	Plumas, Sierra, Tehama	At the beginning of his second term, the counties switched districts and were replaced with two counties: Glenn and Colusa county.
Harry Polsley	Democratic	January 4, 1909 – January 4, 1915	Tehama, Glenn, Colusa	At the beginning of his second term, the counties switched districts and were replaced with two counties: Glenn and Colusa county.
Elmer Lee Sisson	Democratic	January 4, 1915 – January 8, 1917	Tehama, Glenn, Colusa	
Harry Polsley	Democratic	January 8, 1917 – January 3, 1921	Tehama, Glenn, Colusa	
Van Bernard	Republican	January 3, 1921 – January 5, 1931	Tehama, Glenn, Colusa	
John Evangelist Frazier	Republican	January 5, 1931 – January 2, 1933	Butte, Sutter, Yuba	
Ernest C. Crowley	Democratic	January 2, 1933 – September 22, 1952	Solano, Lake, Napa	Died in office from a heart attack.
Vacant		September 22, 1952 – January 5, 1953	Solano, Lake, Napa	
Samuel R. Geddes	Democratic	January 5, 1953 – January 2, 1961	Solano, Napa	
Robert L. Leggett	Democratic	January 2, 1961 – January 7, 1963	Solano, Napa	
Pearce Young	Democratic	January 7, 1963 – December 19, 1966	Solano, Napa	Resigned before his term expired.
Vacant		December 19, 1966 – January 2, 1967	Solano, Napa	
John F. Dunlap	Democratic	January 2, 1967 – November 30, 1974	Solano, Napa	
Eugene T. Gualco	Democratic	December 2, 1974 – November 30, 1978	Sacramento	
Jean Moorhead Duffy	Republican	December 4, 1978 – November 30, 1986	Sacramento	
Tim Leslie	Republican	December 1, 1986 – May 16, 1991	Placer, Sacramento	Resigned.
Vacant		May 16, 1991 – September 18, 1991	Placer, Sacramento	
B. T. Collins	Republican	September 18, 1991 – March 19, 1993	Placer, Sacramento	Sworn in after winning special election. He also died in office.
Vacant		March 19, 1993 – July 30, 1993	Placer, Sacramento	
Barbara Alby	Republican	July 30, 1993 – November 30, 1998	Sacramento	Took oath of office after special election succeeding B. T. Collins.
Dave Cox	Republican	December 7, 1998 – November 30, 2004	Sacramento	
Roger Niello	Republican	December 6, 2004 – November 30, 2010	Placer, Sacramento	
Richard Pan	Democratic	December 6, 2010 – November 30, 2012	Placer, Sacramento	
Frank Bigelow	Republican	December 3, 2012 – November 30,2022	Alpine, Amador, Calaveras, El Dorado, Madera, Mariposa, Mono, Placer, Tuolumne	
Joe Patterson	Republican	December 5, 2022 – present	El Dorado, Placer	

== Election results (1990–present) ==
=== 2024 ===
2024 California State Assembly 5th district election
Primary election
Party	Candidate	Votes	%
Republican	Joe Patterson (incumbent)	93,875	58.2
Democratic	Nevada Parker	47,611	29.5
Democratic	Athena Singh	12,581	7.8
Republican	Aabash Gautam	7,125	4.4
Total votes		161,192	100.0
General election
Republican	Joe Patterson (incumbent)	174,220	62.0
Democratic	Nevada Parker	106,763	38.0
Total votes		280,973	100.0
Republican hold			

=== 2022 ===
2022 California State Assembly 5th district election
Primary election
Party	Candidate	Votes	%
Democratic	Rebecca Chenoweth	58,856	38.6
Republican	Joe Patterson	56,923	37.3
Republican	Jason Paletta	27,930	18.3
Republican	Greg Smith	8,895	5.8
Total votes		152,604	100.0
General election
Republican	Joe Patterson	134,729	60.2
Democratic	Rebecca Chenoweth	89,245	39.8
Total votes		223,974	100.0
Republican hold			

=== 2020 ===
2020 California State Assembly 5th district election
Primary election
Party	Candidate	Votes	%
Republican	Frank Bigelow (incumbent)	104,807	100.0
Total votes		104,807	100.0
General election
Republican	Frank Bigelow (incumbent)	165,624	100.0
Total votes		165,624	100.0
Republican hold			

=== 2018 ===
2018 California State Assembly 5th district election
Primary election
Party	Candidate	Votes	%
Republican	Frank Bigelow (incumbent)	72,983	62.4
Democratic	Carla J. Neal	43,983	37.6
Total votes		116,966	100.0
General election
Republican	Frank Bigelow (incumbent)	106,791	59.9
Democratic	Carla J. Neal	71,488	40.1
Total votes		178,279	100.0
Republican hold			

=== 2016 ===
2016 California State Assembly 5th district election
Primary election
Party	Candidate	Votes	%
Republican	Frank Bigelow (incumbent)	73,180	60.0
Democratic	Robert Carabas	27,190	22.3
Democratic	Kai Ellsworth	11,313	9.3
No party preference	Mark Belden	10,289	8.4
Total votes		121,972	100.0
General election
Republican	Frank Bigelow (incumbent)	121,644	64.5
Democratic	Robert Carabas	66,949	35.5
Total votes		188,593	100.0
Republican hold			

=== 2014 ===
2014 California State Assembly 5th district election
Primary election
Party	Candidate	Votes	%
Republican	Frank Bigelow (incumbent)	67,924	99.9
Libertarian	Patrick D. Hogan (write-in)	60	0.1
Total votes		67,984	100.0
General election
Republican	Frank Bigelow (incumbent)	88,602	74.2
Libertarian	Patrick D. Hogan	30,735	25.8
Total votes		119,337	100.0
Republican hold			

=== 2012 ===
2012 California State Assembly 5th district election
Primary election
Party	Candidate	Votes	%
Republican	Rico Oller	34,673	33.9
Republican	Frank Bigelow	29,584	28.9
Democratic	Tim (Timothy) K. Fitzgerald	18,138	17.7
Democratic	Mark Boyd	13,583	13.3
No party preference	Mark Belden	4,158	4.1
Republican	Kevin Lancaster	2,151	2.1
Total votes		102,287	100.0
General election
Republican	Frank Bigelow	82,293	52.3
Republican	Rico Oller	75,071	47.7
Total votes		157,364	100.0
Republican gain from Democratic			

=== 2010 ===
2010 California State Assembly 5th district election
Party	Candidate	Votes	%
Democratic	Richard Pan	78,239	49.6
Republican	Andy Pugno	71,910	45.5
Peace and Freedom	Elizabeth Martinez	7,850	4.9
Total votes		157,999	100.0
Democratic gain from Republican			

=== 2008 ===
2008 California State Assembly 5th district election
Party	Candidate	Votes	%
Republican	Roger Niello (incumbent)	101,888	54.2
Democratic	Danial Leahy	71,733	38.2
Peace and Freedom	Karen Martinez	14,295	7.6
Total votes		187,916	100.0
Republican hold			

=== 2006 ===
2006 California State Assembly 5th district election
Party	Candidate	Votes	%
Republican	Roger Niello (incumbent)	84,334	61.7
Democratic	Brandon Bell	48,325	35.3
Peace and Freedom	Mike Lopez	4,068	3.0
Total votes		136,727	100.0
Republican hold			

=== 2004 ===
2004 California State Assembly 5th district election
Party	Candidate	Votes	%
Republican	Roger Niello	104,895	60.2
Democratic	Sandra A. Carey	62,710	36.0
Libertarian	Melissa Manfre	6,524	3.7
Total votes		174,129	100.0
Republican hold			

=== 2002 ===
2002 California State Assembly 5th district election
Party	Candidate	Votes	%
Republican	Dave Cox (incumbent)	79,527	65.2
Democratic	Eric Ulis	37,277	30.5
Libertarian	Roberto Liebman	5,336	4.3
Total votes		122,140	100.0
Republican hold			

=== 2000 ===
2000 California State Assembly 5th district election
Party	Candidate	Votes	%
Republican	Dave Cox (incumbent)	111,377	75.9
Libertarian	Eugene Frazier	35,353	24.1
Total votes		146,730	100.00
Republican hold			

=== 1998 ===
1998 California State Assembly 5th district election
Party	Candidate	Votes	%
Republican	Dave Cox	74,497	57.2
Democratic	Linda Davis	51,150	39.3
Libertarian	Eugene Frazier	4,496	3.45
Total votes		130,143	100.0
Republican hold			

=== 1996 ===
1996 California State Assembly 5th district election
Party	Candidate	Votes	%
Republican	Barbara Alby (incumbent)	91,555	61.6
Democratic	Eileen Burke-Trent	57,152	38.4
Total votes		148,707	100.0
Republican hold			

=== 1994 ===
1994 California State Assembly 5th district election
Party	Candidate	Votes	%
Republican	Barbara Alby (incumbent)	78,886	60.3
Democratic	Joan Barry	51,864	39.7
Total votes		130,751	100.0
Republican hold			

=== 1993 (special) ===
1993 California State Assembly 5th district special election Vacancy resulting from the death of B. T. Collins
Party	Candidate	Votes	%
Republican	Barbara Alby	22,962	48.5
Democratic	Joan Berry	18,511	39.1
Libertarian	Dave Walker	3,060	6.5
Independent	Ronald R. Curry	2,806	5.9
Total votes		47,339	100.0
Republican hold			

=== 1992 ===
1992 California State Assembly 5th district election
Party	Candidate	Votes	%
Republican	B. T. Collins (incumbent)	93,833	58.8
Democratic	Joan Barry	65,787	41.2
No party	Dale Cressey (write-in)	25	0.0
Total votes		159,645	100.0
Republican hold			

=== 1991 (special) ===
1991 California State Assembly 5th district special election Vacancy from the resignation of Tim Leslie
Party	Candidate	Votes	%
Republican	B. T. Collins	19,785	62.1
Libertarian	David M. McCann	12,091	37.9
Total votes		31,876	100.0
Republican hold			

=== 1990 ===
1990 California State Assembly 5th district election
Party	Candidate	Votes	%
Republican	Tim Leslie (incumbent)	82,757	62.5
Democratic	Joe Buonaiuto	49,682	37.5
Total votes		132,439	100.0
Republican hold			

== See also ==
- California State Assembly
- California State Assembly districts
- Districts in California
