= Senator Pittman (disambiguation) =

Key Pittman (1872–1940) was a U.S. Senator from Nevada from 1913 to 1940. Senator Pittman may also refer to:

- Anastasia Pittman (born 1970), Oklahoma State Senate
- Charles Pittman (politician), Mississippi State Senate
- Edwin L. Pittman (born 1935), Mississippi State Senate
- Jeff Pittman (born 1971), Kansas State Senate
- Joe Pittman (politician) (born 1977), Pennsylvania State Senate
- Stan Pittman (1920–1999), California State Senate
- Trip Pittman (born 1960), Alabama State Senate
- Vail M. Pittman (1880–1964), Nevada State Senate

== See also ==
- Robert Carter Pitman (1825–1891), Massachusetts State Senate
