= Granite Bay, California =

- Census-designated place
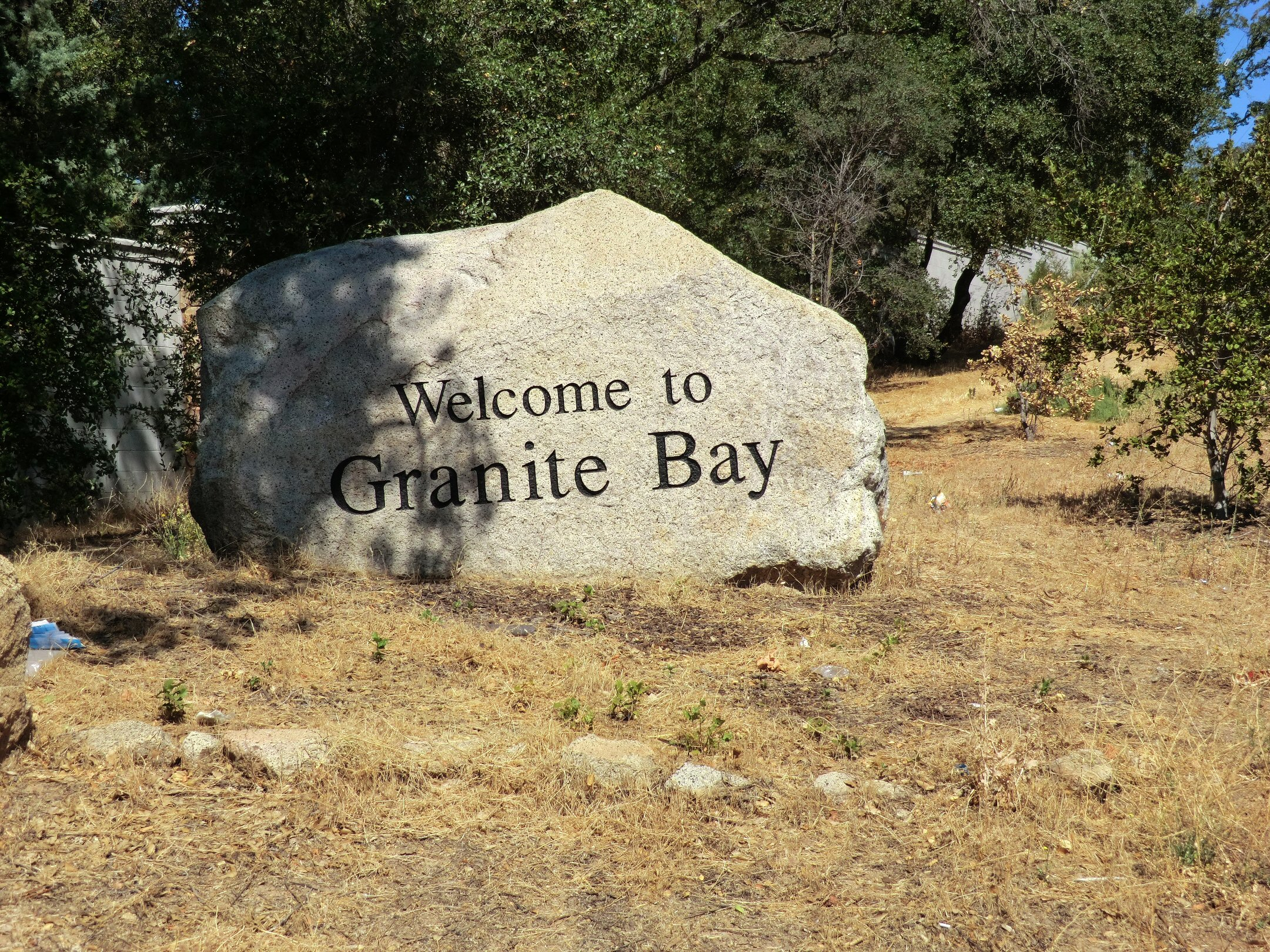
- Welcome to Granite Bay sign
- Interactive map of Granite Bay, California
- Location in the United States
- Coordinates: 38°45′36″N 121°10′17″W
- Country: United States
- State: California
- County: Placer

Government
  - State Senator: Roger Niello (R)
  - Assemblymember: Joe Patterson (R)
  - U. S. Rep.: Kevin Kiley (I)

Area
  - Total: 21.592 sq mi (55.92 km^{2})
  - Land: 21.548 sq mi (55.81 km^{2})
  - Water: 0.043 sq mi (0.11 km^{2}) 0.20%
- Elevation: 410 ft (120 m)

Population (2020)
  - Total: 21,247
  - Density: 986.03/sq mi (380.71/km^{2})
- Time zone: UTC-8 (PST)
  - Summer (DST): UTC-7 (PDT)
- ZIP code: 95746, 95661
- Area code: 916, 279
- FIPS code: 06-30693
- GNIS feature ID: 2408318

Granite Bay is a census-designated place (CDP) in Placer County, California, United States. It is part of the Sacramento metropolitan area. The population was 21,247 at the 2020 census, up from 20,402 at the 2010 census. The ZIP codes are 95746 and 95661. Granite Bay is a primarily residential suburb of Sacramento and is located just east of Roseville and west of Folsom Lake.

== Geography ==
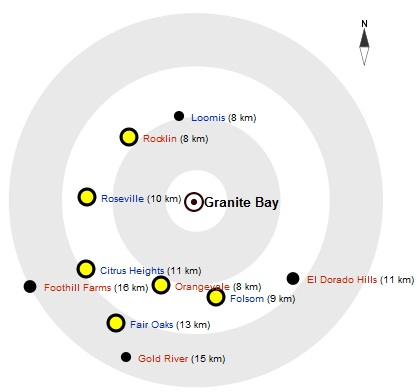
Map of Granite Bay

Granite Bay is located at 38°44′55″N 121°10′47″W (38.748504, -121.179793). According to the United States Census Bureau, the CDP has a total area of 21.6 square miles (56 square kilometers), of which, 21.5 square miles (56 km^{2}) of it is land and 0.04 square miles (0.10 km^{2}) of it (0.20 percent) is water. The place name, Granite Bay, is derived from a bay in Folsom Lake, a reservoir on the east side of the town created in 1955. The entire town is underlain by granodiorite of the Penryn Pluton of Cretaceous age, hence the geological basis for the place name.

== Climate ==
Granite Bay has a hot-summer Mediterranean climate (Köppen climate classification Csa) that is characterized by cool, wet winters and hot, dry summers.

Climate data for Granite Bay, California
Month	Jan	Feb	Mar	Apr	May	Jun	Jul	Aug	Sep	Oct	Nov	Dec	Year
Record high °F (°C)	75 (24)	78 (26)	86 (30)	98 (37)	107 (42)	110 (43)	115 (46)	110 (43)	111 (44)	102 (39)	87 (31)	76 (24)	115 (46)
Mean daily maximum °F (°C)	53 (12)	60 (16)	64 (18)	71 (22)	80 (27)	88 (31)	94 (34)	92 (33)	87 (31)	77 (25)	63 (17)	54 (12)	74 (23)
Daily mean °F (°C)	46 (8)	51 (11)	54 (12)	60 (16)	66 (19)	73 (23)	78 (26)	76 (24)	73 (23)	65 (18)	54 (12)	47 (8)	62 (17)
Mean daily minimum °F (°C)	39 (4)	42 (6)	44 (7)	48 (9)	53 (12)	58 (14)	61 (16)	61 (16)	58 (14)	52 (11)	44 (7)	39 (4)	50 (10)
Record low °F (°C)	21 (−6)	23 (−5)	27 (−3)	33 (1)	36 (2)	43 (6)	48 (9)	46 (8)	41 (5)	31 (−1)	27 (−3)	16 (−9)	16 (−9)
Average precipitation inches (mm)	3.98 (101)	3.46 (88)	3.07 (78)	1.58 (40)	0.58 (15)	0.12 (3.0)	0.04 (1.0)	0.06 (1.5)	0.35 (8.9)	1.08 (27)	2.80 (71)	3.33 (85)	20.45 (519.4)
Source: http://www.myforecast.com/bin/climate.m?city=516009&metric=false

== Cultural resources ==
The history of Granite Bay started with the Maidu tribe of Native Americans, and it continued when miners, farmers, and others seeking to do business came during the Gold Rush to strike a fortune. The Granite Bay area was officially recognized on July 28, 1987 by the Board of Supervisors.

The Nisenan, also known as the Southern Maidu, were one of three Maiduan-speaking tribes in the northern half of the Sacramento Valley. The Granite Bay area is located in the ethnographic territory of the Nisenan. The Nisenan lived along the American, Yuba, and Bear Rivers, as well as the Feather River, to which their territory extended.

== Demographics ==
Historical population
Census	Pop.	Note	%±
2000	19,388		—
2010	20,402		5.2%
2020	21,247		4.1%
U.S. Decennial Census; 2000 2010

=== 2020 census ===
As of the 2020 census, Granite Bay had a population of 21,247 and a population density of 986.0 inhabitants per square mile (380.7/km^{2}).

Racial composition as of the 2020 census
Race	Number	Percent
White	16,440	77.4%
Black or African American	197	0.9%
American Indian and Alaska Native	116	0.5%
Asian	1,899	8.9%
Native Hawaiian and Other Pacific Islander	26	0.1%
Some other race	354	1.7%
Two or more races	2,215	10.4%
Hispanic or Latino (of any race)	1,901	8.9%

The census reported that 99.0% of residents lived in households, 0.6% lived in non-institutionalized group quarters, and 0.4% were institutionalized. 88.8% of residents lived in urban areas, while 11.2% lived in rural areas.

The age distribution was 22.1% under the age of 18, 7.1% aged 18 to 24, 16.1% aged 25 to 44, 32.6% aged 45 to 64, and 22.1% who were 65 years of age or older; the median age was 48.8 years. For every 100 females, there were 97.1 males, and for every 100 females age 18 and over there were 95.4 males.

There were 7,456 households, of which 33.1% had children under the age of 18 living in them. Of all households, 72.6% were married-couple households, 3.2% were cohabiting couple households, 14.6% had a female householder with no spouse or partner present, and 9.7% had a male householder with no spouse or partner present. About 13.6% of all households were made up of individuals and 7.6% had someone living alone who was 65 years of age or older; the average household size was 2.82. There were 6,198 families (83.1% of all households).

There were 7,685 housing units at an average density of 356.6/sq mi (137.7/km^{2}); 7,456 (97.0%) were occupied. Of these, 90.1% were owner-occupied and 9.9% were occupied by renters. The homeowner vacancy rate was 0.6% and the rental vacancy rate was 4.2%.

=== 2023 American Community Survey estimates ===
In 2023, the US Census Bureau estimated that 11.4% of the population were foreign-born. Of all people aged 5 or older, 85.7% spoke only English at home, 3.9% spoke Spanish, 5.8% spoke other Indo-European languages, 3.0% spoke Asian or Pacific Islander languages, and 1.6% spoke other languages. Of those aged 25 or older, 97.5% were high school graduates and 62.0% had a bachelor's degree.

The median household income in 2023 was $190,000, and the per capita income was $85,943. About 4.3% of families and 5.0% of the population were below the poverty line.

=== 2010 census ===
At the 2010 census Granite Bay had a population of 20,402. The population density was 945.8 inhabitants per square mile (365.2/km^{2}). The racial makeup of Granite Bay was 17,960 (88.0%) White, 148 (0.7%) African American, 138 (0.7%) Native American, 1,152 (5.6%) Asian, 28 (0.1%) Pacific Islander, 222 (1.1%) from other races, and 754 (3.7%) from two or more races. Hispanic or Latino of any race were 1,260 persons (6.2%).

The census reported that 20,353 people (99.8% of the population) lived in households, 38 (0.2%) lived in non-institutionalized group quarters, and 11 (0.1%) were institutionalized.

There were 7,202 households, 2,857 (39.7%) had children under the age of 18 living in them, 5,223 (72.5%) were opposite-sex married couples living together, 473 (6.6%) had a female householder with no husband present, 260 (3.6%) had a male householder with no wife present. There were 201 (2.8%) unmarried opposite-sex partnerships, and 34 (0.5%) same-sex married couples or partnerships. 1,006 households (14.0%) were one person and 521 (7.2%) had someone living alone who was 65 or older. The average household size was 2.83. There were 5,956 families (82.7% of households); the average family size was 3.11.

The age distribution was 5,309 people (26.0%) under the age of 18, 1,300 people (6.4%) aged 18 to 24, 3,206 people (15.7%) aged 25 to 44, 7,621 people (37.4%) aged 45 to 64, and 2,966 people (14.5%) who were 65 or older. The median age was 46.0 years. For every 100 females, there were 98.5 males. For every 100 females age 18 and over, there were 96.2 males.

There were 7,542 housing units at an average density of 349.6 per square mile, of the occupied units 6,414 (89.1%) were owner-occupied and 788 (10.9%) were rented. The homeowner vacancy rate was 1.3%; the rental vacancy rate was 8.8%. 18,270 people (89.6% of the population) lived in owner-occupied housing units and 2,083 people (10.2%) lived in rental housing units.

According to the Sacramento Association of REALTORS, the median price of a detached single family home is $715,000 as of April 2009.

== Notable people ==
- Shareef Abdur-Rahim - Assistant general manager, Sacramento Kings and retired National Basketball Association (NBA) player
- Rick Adelman - Minnesota Timberwolves head coach, former Sacramento Kings head coach
- Danny Ainge - Former NBA basketball player and current President of Basketball Operations for the Boston Celtics
- Dusty Baker - Houston Astros manager, former Washington Nationals, San Francisco Giants, Chicago Cubs, and Cincinnati Reds manager; retired Major League Baseball player primarily with the Atlanta Braves and the Los Angeles Dodgers
- Lincoln Brewster - contemporary Christian music artist who is also the senior worship pastor at Bayside Church.
- Steve Cook - Former professional ten-pin bowler and member of the PBA Hall of Fame
- DeMarcus Cousins - Professional NBA player for the Sacramento Kings
- Bobby Jackson - Retired NBA player and current assistant coach for the Sacramento Kings
- Eddie Jordan - Philadelphia 76ers head coach, former Sacramento Kings, Washington Wizards, Rutgers Scarlet Knights head coach
- Jeff Keith - Singer of band Tesla
- Leron Lee - Retired Major League Baseball player for the St. Louis Cardinals, Los Angeles Dodgers, Cleveland Indians and San Diego Padres
- Geoff Petrie - Sacramento Kings President of Basketball Operations and former NBA player with the Portland Trail Blazers
- Maureen Reagan - Daughter of former President Ronald Reagan, lived here until her death
- Summer Sanders - Multiple gold medalist in swimming at the 1992 Summer Olympics, TV Sports commentator and personality
- Dallas Sartz - NFL linebacker
- Steve Sax - Retired MLB baseball player (primarily second baseman for the Los Angeles Dodgers, New York Yankees, Chicago White Sox, and Oakland Athletics)
- Sematary - Rapper, songwriter, and record producer
- Predrag Stojaković - New Orleans Hornets, former Sacramento Kings small forward
- Tommy Thompson - American soccer player who currently plays for the San Jose Earthquakes in Major League Soccer.
- Maria Viktorovna - ASMR practitioner and content creator known under the pseudonym “Gentle Whispering.”
- Chris Webber - Retired Sacramento Kings power forward and center
- Mak Whitham - soccer player
- Jason Williams - Orlando Magic, former Sacramento Kings point guard

== Education ==
Granite Bay is served by two high school districts and their feeder K-8 districts: The Loomis Union School District and Placer Union High School District for the northern portion of the community, and the Eureka Union School District and Roseville Joint Union High School District for the southern portion. The two high schools serving Granite Bay are RJUHSD's Granite Bay High School and PUHSD's Del Oro High School in nearby Loomis. The Eureka Union School District is also one of the state's highest performing districts according to Standardized Testing and Reporting. This is one of the few California school districts with its own parent sponsored educational foundations.
