= Paul L. Byrne =

American politician (1910–1962)

Member of the California Senate from the 6th district
- In office January 8, 1951 - August 28, 1962
- Preceded by: Harry E. Drobish
- Succeeded by: Stan Pittman

Personal details
- Born: May 8, 1910 San Diego, California, U.S.
- Died: August 28, 1962 (aged 52) Chico, California, U.S.
- Party: Republican
- Spouse: Elsie E. Faulkner (m. 1935)
- Children: Paul F. Byrne
- Education: University of California, Berkeley; Chico State College

Military service
- Branch/service: United States Marine Corps
- Battles/wars: World War II

Paul Lester Byrne (May 8, 1910 – August 28, 1962) served in the California State Senate for the 6th district from 1951 until his death in 1962. He was known as an advocate for farming in California.

== Early life and education ==
Byrne was born on May 8, 1910, in San Diego, California. He attended University of California, Berkeley and graduated from Chico State College with a bachelor of arts in 1933. He worked as the business manager for Associated Students at Chico State College, and for nine years at the Welfare Division at McClellan Field in Sacramento. In 1943, he joined the United States Marine Corps, and served in Hawaii during World War II in a headquarters unit.

== Career ==
The Paul L. Byrne Agricultural Teaching and Research Center and the Paul L. Byrne Memorial University Farm at California State University, Chico are named after him.

== Death ==
On August 28, 1962, Byrne died from an acute heart attack while working in his office in Chico.
