= Tim Leslie =

American politician

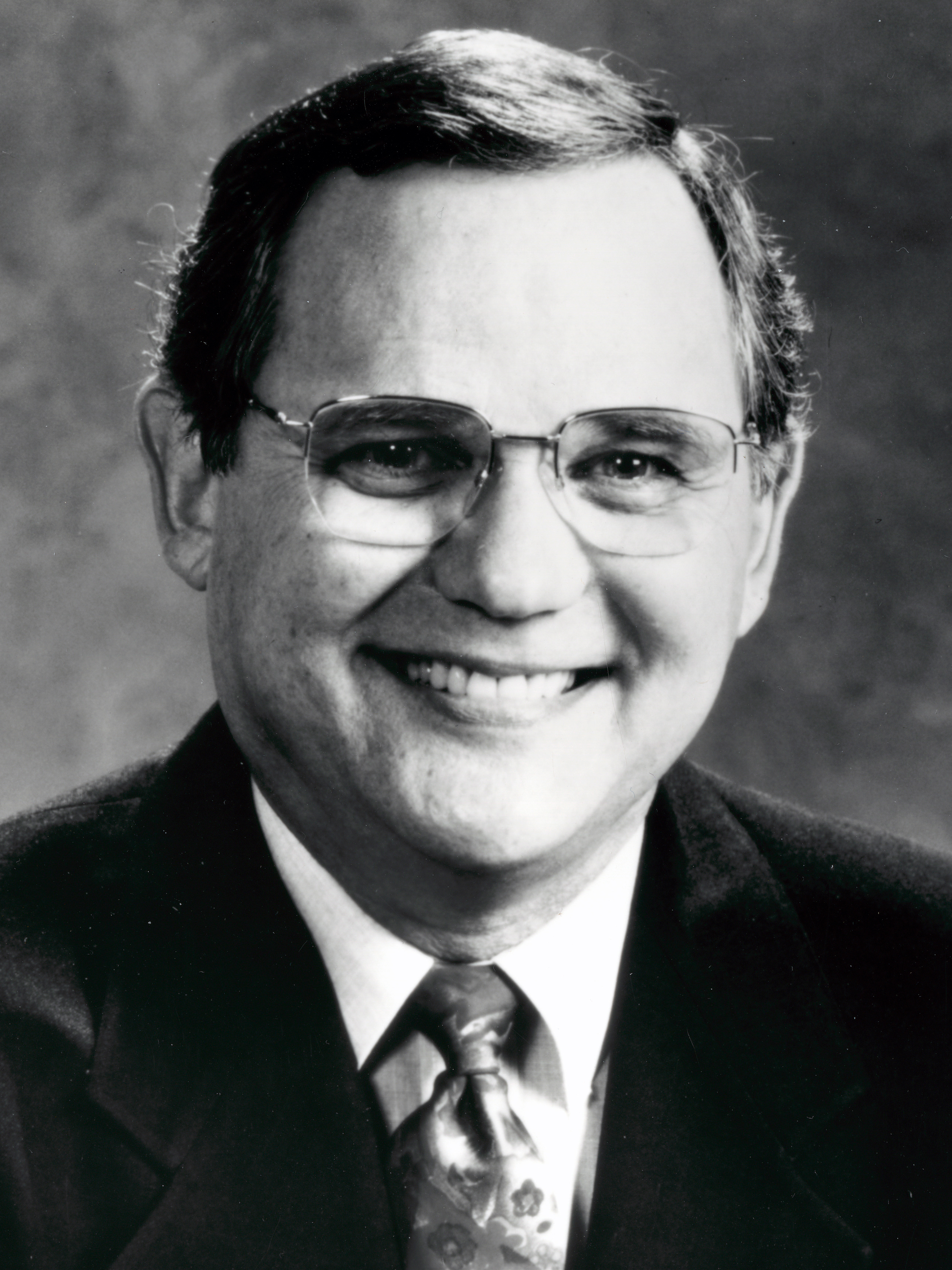
- Leslie in 2001

Member of the California State Assembly from the 4th district
- In office December 4, 2000 – November 30, 2006
- Preceded by: Rico Oller
- Succeeded by: Ted Gaines

Member of the California Senate from the 1st district
- In office May 16, 1991 – November 30, 2000
- Preceded by: John T. Doolittle
- Succeeded by: Rico Oller

Member of the California State Assembly from the 5th district
- In office December 1, 1986 – May 16, 1991
- Preceded by: Jean Moorhead Duffy
- Succeeded by: B. T. Collins

Personal details
- Born: Robert Timothy Leslie; February 4, 1942 (age 84) Ashland, Oregon, U.S.
- Party: Republican
- Spouse: Clydene
- Children: 2
- Education: California State University, Long Beach; University of Southern California

Robert Timothy Leslie (born February 4, 1942) is an American politician from California and a member of the Republican Party in United States.

== Early life and education ==
Born in Ashland, Oregon, Leslie moved to California with his family as a two-year-old. He earned his Bachelor of Science degree in political science at California State University, Long Beach where he was a member of Sigma Pi fraternity. He then earned his Master of Public Administration from the University of Southern California.

== State legislature ==
A one-time lobbyist, Leslie first ran for the California State Assembly in 1984, losing to Democratic incumbent Jean Moorhead Duffy by just 1 percent. With Moorhead Duffy not seeking re-election in 1986, Leslie comfortably won election to the Sacramento area 5th District over Jack Dugan, an assistant state Attorney General. He won re-election in 1988 and 1990 without serious opposition. In 1991, Leslie ran for the California State Senate in a special election for the 1st district left vacant when GOP incumbent John Doolittle was elected to Congress. He easily won re-election in 1992 and 1996.

In 2000, when term limits prevented him from seeking re-election to the State Senate, Leslie ran successfully for the 4th District in the State Assembly again and won re-election in 2002 and 2004.

== Lieutenant governor race ==
In 1998, Leslie was the Republican nominee for lieutenant governor, but lost to Democrat Cruz Bustamante 52.7% to 38.8%.

California Assembly
Preceded by Jean Moorhead Duffy	California State Assembly, 5th District; December 1, 1986 – May 16, 1991	Succeeded by B. T. Collins
Preceded by Thomas "Rico" Oller	California State Assembly, 4th District; December 4, 2000 – November 30, 2006	Succeeded by Ted Gaines
California Senate
Preceded by John Doolittle	California State Senate, 1st District; May 16, 1991 - November 30, 2000	Succeeded by Thomas "Rico" Oller
