= Eureka Union School District =

School district in California

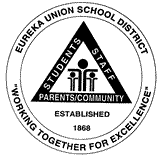

Address
- 5455 Eureka Road Granite Bay, California, 95746; United States

District information
- Type: Public
- Grades: K–8
- NCES District ID: 0613080

Students and staff
- Students: 3,149
- Teachers: 134.84 (FTE)
- Staff: 101.32 (FTE)
- Student–teacher ratio: 23.35

Other information
- Website: www.eurekausd.org

The Eureka Union School District is a primary education school district in Placer County, California overseeing schools for kindergarten through 8th grade in parts of East Roseville and Granite Bay.

== Schools ==
=== K-3 ===
- Oakhills School
- Greenhills School

=== Kindergraden-Grade 3 ===
- Greenhills School
- Oakhills School
- Maidu School

=== Grade 4-Grade 6 ===
- Ridgeview School
- Excelsior School
- Eureka School, no longer operating as a school.

=== Junior high schools ===
- Olympus Junior High School
- Cavitt Junior High School

== Ridgeview Eco-Lab ==
=== Teachers behind it ===
The Ridgeview Ecolab was created by Jennifer & Stephen Kinloch; married teachers. It was opened 8 years ago and can be found in the top left of the school field. The rest of the Ridgeview 6th grade team is also supporting this project. Shannon Prior, Ryan Davey, Leslie Ashby, Chelsea Hirsch, and Radford Peterson all 6th grade teachers at Ridgeview, help keep this laboratory alive.

== Notable alumni ==
Kevin Kiley, a Cavitt Junior High School alumnus, went on to become a Republican politician, representing California's 3rd congressional district in the House of Representatives.
