= Frank Bigelow =

American politician (born 1954)

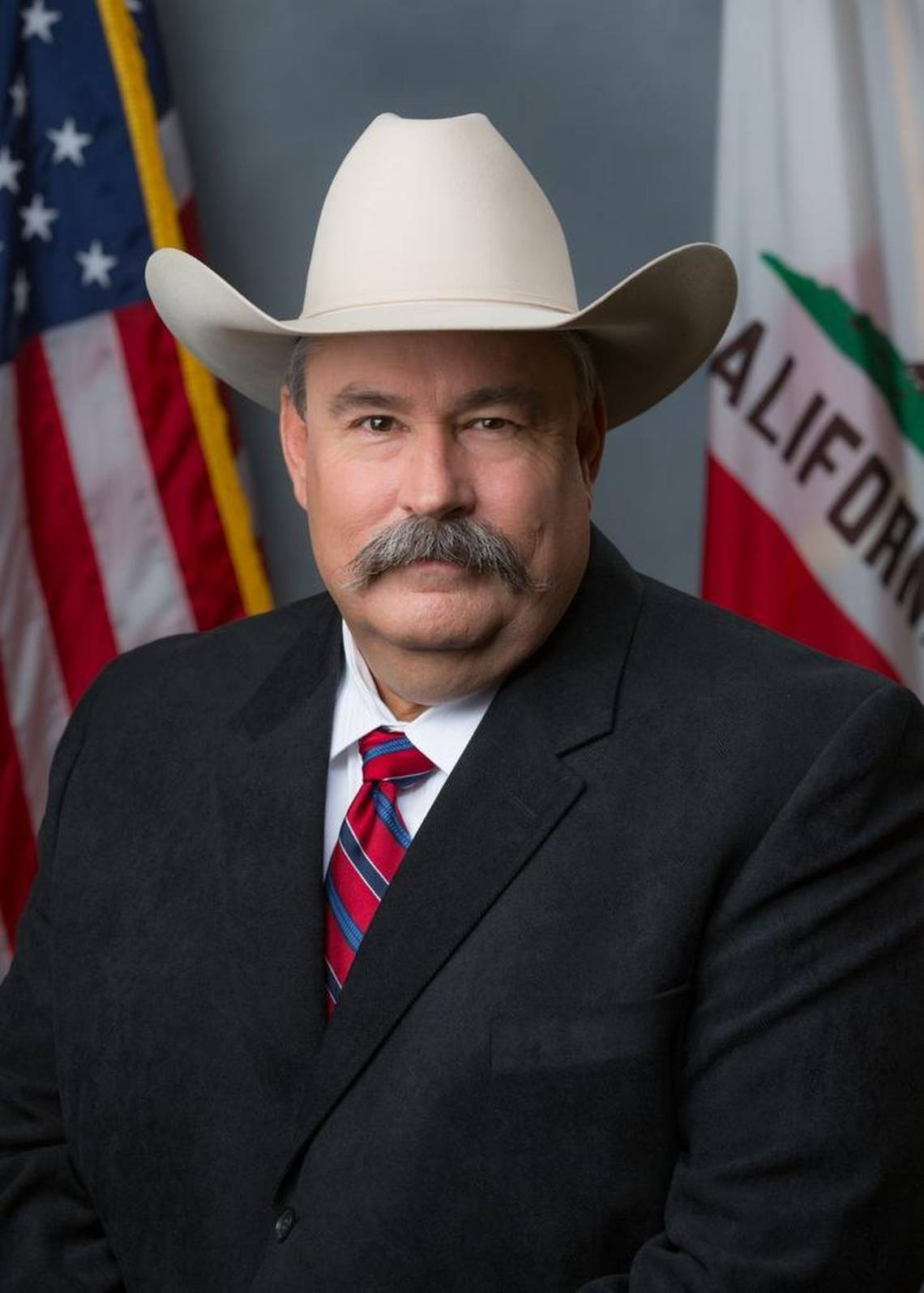

Member of the California State Assembly from the 5th district
- In office December 3, 2012 – December 5, 2022
- Preceded by: Richard Pan
- Succeeded by: Seat eliminated

Personal details
- Born: Frank Edward Bigelow; July 22, 1954 (age 71) Fresno, California, U.S.
- Party: Republican
- Spouse: Barbara Bigelow (after 1978)
- Children: 3
- Profession: Rancher
- Website: ad05.asmrc.org

Frank Bigelow (born July 22, 1954) is an American politician who served in the California State Assembly. Bigelow is a Republican who represented the 5th district, encompassing Gold Country and the central Sierra Nevada. He briefly competed in stock car racing, driving in the NASCAR Winston West Series from 1977 to 1979.

== Early life ==
On July 22, 1954, Bigelow was born in Fresno, California.

== Career ==
In 1973, Bigelow became an employee and later became the Vice President of Ponderosa Telephone Company.

In 1998, Bigelow was elected to the Madera County Board of Supervisors. From 2006-2007, Bigelow served as President of California State Association of Counties.In 2007, Bigelow was appointed to become a member of the California Partnership for the San Joaquin Valley.

In 2012, Bigelow decided to campaign for the California State Assembly. On November 6, 2012, Bigelow won a surprise victory by defeating former state Senator Rico Oller, who had represented much of the area in both houses of the legislature before, and became California state Assemblyman for the 5th district.

Bigelow has also been a volunteer fireman in Madera County for more than 40 years. He is currently the fire captain at Madera County Volunteer Fire, Station 17 in O'Neals. He has served on the Board of Directors of American Shorthorn Association, Madera County Cattlemen’s Association, and Madera County Ag Boosters.

On February 17, 2022, Bigelow announced that he would not be a candidate for reelection.

== Electoral history ==
=== 2012 California State Assembly ===
California State Assembly election, 2012
Primary election
Party	Candidate	Votes	%
Republican	Rico Oller	34,673	33.9
Republican	Frank Bigelow	29,584	28.9
Democratic	Tim (Timothy) K. Fitzgerald	18,138	17.7
Democratic	Mark Boyd	13,583	13.3
No party preference	Mark Belden	4,158	4.1
Republican	Kevin Lancaster	2,151	2.1
Total votes		102,287	100.0
General election
Republican	Frank Bigelow	82,293	52.3
Republican	Rico Oller	75,071	47.7
Total votes		157,364	100.0
Republican win (new seat)			

=== 2014 California State Assembly ===
California's 5th State Assembly district election, 2014
Primary election
Party	Candidate	Votes	%
Republican	Frank Bigelow (incumbent)	67,924	99.9
Libertarian	Patrick D. Hogan (write-in)	60	0.1
Total votes		67,984	100.0
General election
Republican	Frank Bigelow (incumbent)	88,602	74.2
Libertarian	Patrick D. Hogan	30,735	25.8
Total votes		119,337	100.0
Republican hold			

=== 2016 California State Assembly ===
California's 5th State Assembly district election, 2016
Primary election
Party	Candidate	Votes	%
Republican	Frank Bigelow (incumbent)	73,180	60.0
Democratic	Robert Carabas	27,190	22.3
Democratic	Kai Ellsworth	11,313	9.3
No party preference	Mark Belden	10,289	8.4
Total votes		121,972	100.0
General election
Republican	Frank Bigelow (incumbent)	121,644	64.5
Democratic	Robert Carabas	66,949	35.5
Total votes		188,593	100.0
Republican hold			

=== 2018 California State Assembly ===
California's 5th State Assembly district election, 2018
Primary election
Party	Candidate	Votes	%
Republican	Frank Bigelow (incumbent)	72,983	62.4
Democratic	Carla J. Neal	43,983	37.6
Total votes		116,966	100.0
General election
Republican	Frank Bigelow (incumbent)	106,791	59.9
Democratic	Carla J. Neal	71,488	40.1
Total votes		178,279	100.0
Republican hold			

=== 2020 California State Assembly ===
2020 California's 5th State Assembly district election
Primary election
Party	Candidate	Votes	%
Republican	Frank Bigelow (incumbent)	94,368	100%
Total votes			
Republican hold			

== Personal life ==
In 1978, Bigelow married Barbara. They have three children.

== See also ==
- 2012 California State Assembly election § District 5
