= Joe Patterson (California politician) =

American politician

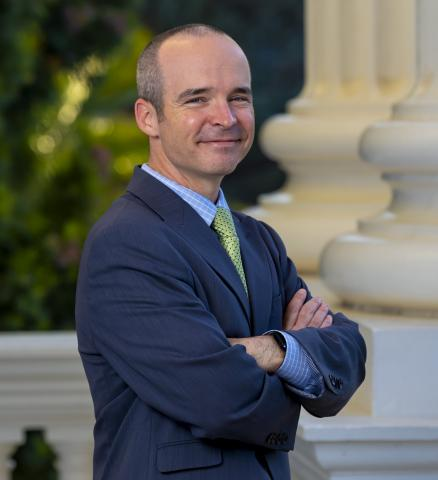

Member of the California State Assembly from the 5th district
- Incumbent
- Assumed office December 5, 2022
- Preceded by: Kevin Kiley (redistricted)

Personal details
- Born: June 9, 1982 (age 44) Napa, California, U.S.
- Party: Republican
- Children: 4
- Education: California State University, Sacramento (BA)
- Occupation: Politician
- Website: Legislative website Campaign website

Joe Patterson is an American politician currently serving as a Republican member of the California State Assembly from the 5th district. Elected in 2022, he assumed office on December 5, 2022. Patterson previously served on the Rocklin City Council from 2016 to 2022, serving as the city's mayor in 2019.

== Early life and education ==
Patterson was born in Napa, California where he graduated from Napa High School. He earned a Bachelor of Arts (BA) in government from California State University, Sacramento. He was admitted to the post-graduate Jesse M. Unruh Assembly Fellowship where he began working in the State Legislature.

== Career ==
Patterson was elected to the Rocklin City Council in November 2016. In December 2018, he was appointed by the city's council as the city's mayor for 2019. He was re-elected as a councilmember in November 2020. Patterson has been the executive director of the California Gaming Association, treasurer for the Rocklin Public Safety Foundation and a member of the Rocklin Area Chamber of Commerce.

In January 2022, Patterson announced his campaign for the 5th State Assembly district to replace retiring Assemblymember Frank Bigelow. He placed second in June nonpartisan blanket primary. Patterson resigned from the Rocklin City Council in June in order focus on his campaign for the State Assembly. He won the November general election against Democrat Rebecca Chenoweth and took office on December 5, 2022.

== Personal life ==
Patterson lives in the Whitney Ranch area of Rocklin with his family including four children.

== Electoral history ==
2022 California State Assembly 5th district election
Primary election
Party	Candidate	Votes	%
Democratic	Rebecca L. Chenoweth	58,856	38.6
Republican	Joe Patterson	56,923	37.3
Republican	Jason Paletta	27,930	18.3
Republican	Greg Smith	8,895	5.8
Total votes		152,604	100.0
General election
Republican	Joe Patterson	134,729	60.2
Democratic	Rebecca L. Chenoweth	89,245	39.8
Total votes		223,974	100.0
Republican hold			

2024 California State Assembly 5th district election
Primary election
Party	Candidate	Votes	%
Republican	Joe Patterson (incumbent)	93,875	58.2
Democratic	Neva Parker	47,611	29.5
Democratic	Athena Singh	12,581	7.8
Republican	Aabhash Gautam	7,125	4.4
Total votes		161,192	100.0
General election
Republican	Joe Patterson (incumbent)	174,220	62.0
Democratic	Neva Parker	106,753	38.0
Total votes		280,973	100.0
Republican hold			
