= Stan Pittman =

American politician (1920–1999)

Stanley Pittman

Member of the California Senate from the 6th district
- In office January 7, 1963 - January 2, 1967
- Preceded by: Paul L. Byrne
- Succeeded by: Alan Short

Personal details
- Born: September 14, 1920 Redding, California, U.S.
- Died: November 10, 1999 (aged 79) Willows, California, U.S.
- Party: Republican
- Spouse: Claire Hurlburt (m. 1953)
- Children: 3

Military service
- Branch/service: United States Navy
- Battles/wars: World War II

Stanley Pittman (September 14, 1920 - November 10, 1999) served in the California State Senate for the 6th district from 1963 to 1967, following service on the Oroville City Council and the Butte County Board of Supervisors. During World War II, he also served in the United States Navy.
