= Dave Cox =

American politician (1938–2010)

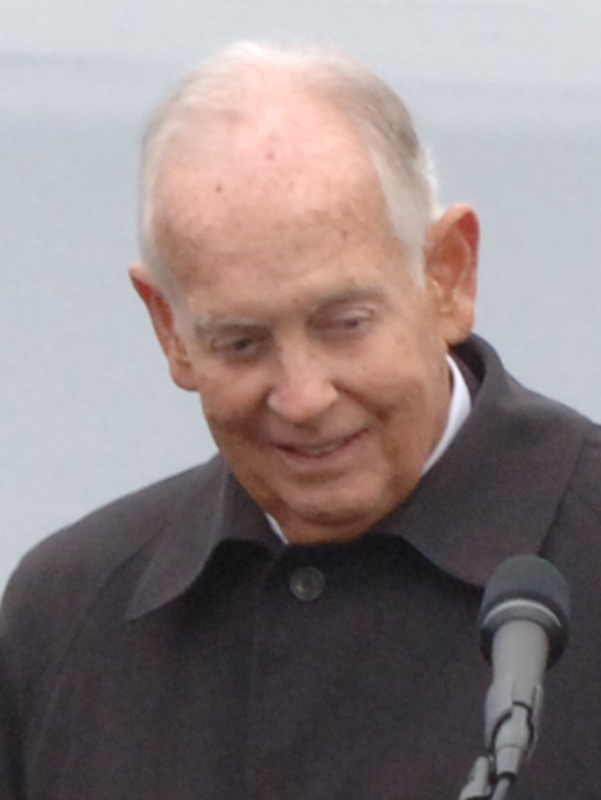
- Cox in 2008

Member of the California Senate from the 1st district
- In office December 6, 2004 – July 13, 2010
- Preceded by: Thomas "Rico" Oller
- Succeeded by: Ted Gaines

Minority Leader of the California Assembly
- In office March 26, 2001 – January 5, 2004
- Preceded by: Bill Campbell
- Succeeded by: Kevin McCarthy

Member of the California State Assembly from the 5th district
- In office December 7, 1998 – November 30, 2004
- Preceded by: Barbara Alby
- Succeeded by: Roger Niello

Member of the Sacramento County Board of Supervisors
- In office 1992–1998

Personal details
- Born: David E. Cox; February 20, 1938 Holdenville, Oklahoma, U.S.
- Died: July 13, 2010 (aged 72) Fair Oaks, California, U.S.
- Party: Republican
- Spouse: Margaret Cox
- Education: University of San Diego
- Profession: Insurance

David E. Cox (February 20, 1938 – July 13, 2010) was an American politician from Holdenville, Oklahoma. A Republican, he served as a California State Senator, representing the 1st district from December 2004 until his death in July 2010, and also served as a California State Assemblyman for the six years immediately before his Senate tenure, including three years as Assembly Republican Leader.

== Career ==
Cox was first elected to the Sacramento County Board of Supervisors in 1992 and served until 1998. Cox also served on the KVIE board as well as the Sacramento Municipal Utility District board. In 1994 Cox made an unsuccessful run for the then-6th Senate district in 1994 against veteran State Senator Leroy F. Greene.

Cox was then elected to the California State Assembly, representing the 5th District from December 1998 to December 2004, and served as the Assembly Republican Leader from March 2000 through January 2004.

In 2004, Cox successfully ran again for the state Senate, this time in the 1st district. His district included all or portions of Alpine, Amador, Calaveras, El Dorado, Lassen, Placer, Plumas, Modoc, Mono, Nevada, Sacramento and Sierra Counties. He served on the following Senate committees:

- Local Government (Chair)
- Appropriations (Vice Chair)
- Banking, Finance and Insurance
- Energy, Utilities and Communications
- Health

Cox was named as the "Outstanding Senator for 2007" by the California State Sheriffs' Association.

Cox earned his bachelor's degree in business administration from the University of San Diego in 1961 and a master's degree from Golden Gate University in 1983. He was married with three children, and lived in Fair Oaks.

Cox was re-elected to his second and last Senate term in 2008 with over 60% of the vote.

Cox died in office on July 13, 2010, following a thirteen-year-long battle with prostate cancer.

California Assembly
Preceded by Barbara Alby	California State Assemblymember; 5th district December 7, 1998 – November 30, 2004	Succeeded by Roger Niello
Party political offices
Preceded by Bill Campbell	Minority Leader of the California State Assembly; March 26, 2001 – January 5, 2004	Succeeded by Kevin McCarthy
California Senate
Preceded by Thomas "Rico" Oller	California State Senator; 1st district December 6, 2004 – July 13, 2010	Succeeded by Ted Gaines
