= Roger Niello =

American politician (born 1948)

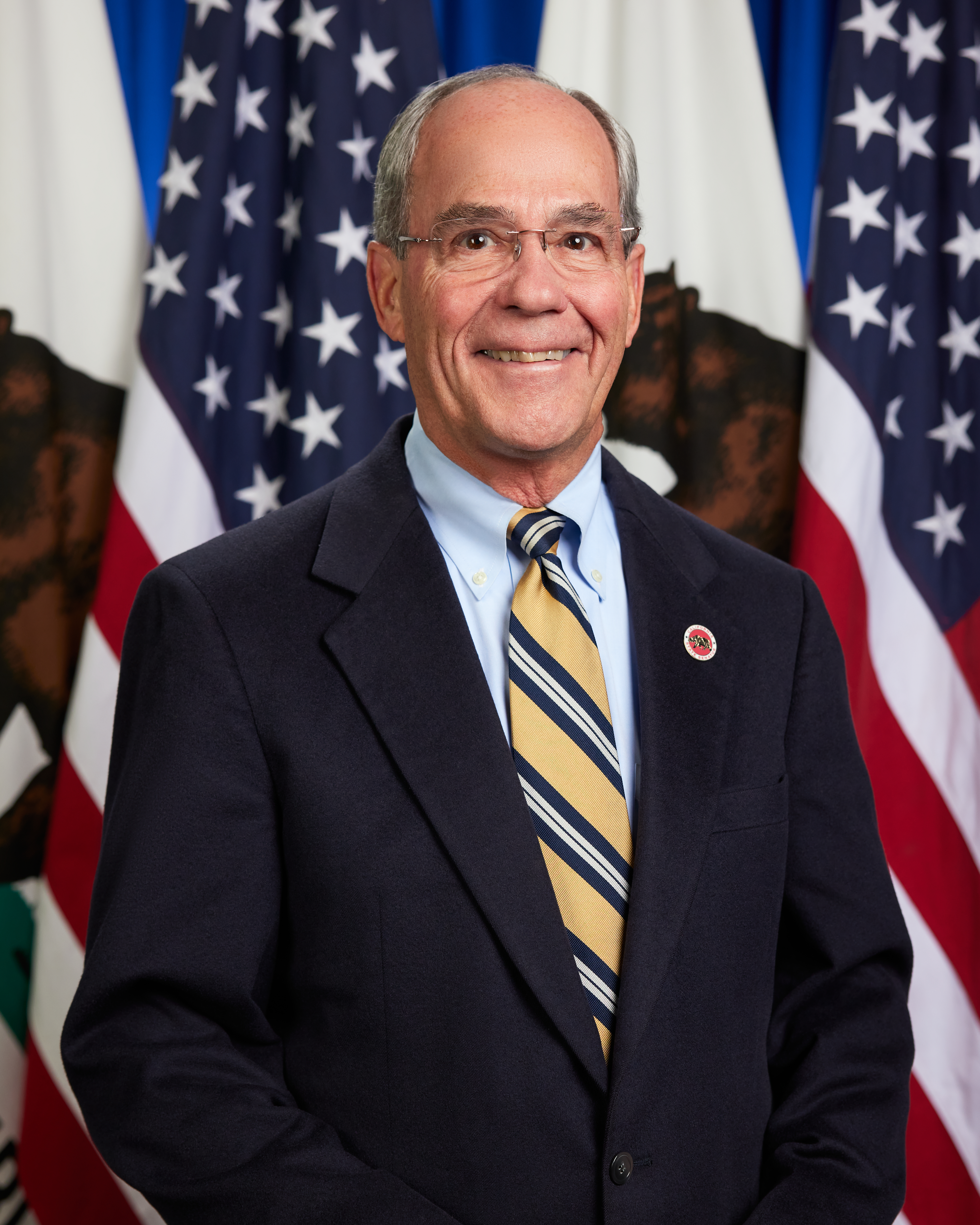
- Official portrait, 2022

Member of the California State Senate from the 6th district
- Incumbent
- Assumed office December 5, 2022
- Preceded by: Richard Pan

Member of the California State Assembly from the 5th district
- In office December 6, 2004 – December 6, 2010
- Preceded by: Dave Cox
- Succeeded by: Richard Pan

Member of the Sacramento County Board of Supervisors from the 4th district
- In office February 1999 – December 2004
- Preceded by: Dave Cox
- Succeeded by: Roberta MacGlashan

Personal details
- Born: Roger William Niello; June 2, 1948 (age 78) San Francisco, California
- Party: Republican
- Spouse: Mary
- Children: 5
- Education: University of California, Berkeley (BS); University of California, Los Angeles (MS)
- Profession: Businessman

Roger Niello (born 2 June 1948) is an American politician who is currently in the California State Senate representing the 6th district, which includes portions of Sacramento and Placer counties. He is a Republican who also served in the California State Assembly from 2004 to 2010.

== Background and education ==
Born in San Francisco, Niello has lived in Sacramento nearly all of his life. After graduating from Sacramento's Encina High School, Niello attended the University of California at Berkeley for his undergraduate studies, and then completed his graduate studies at the University of California at Los Angeles.

Niello worked as a Certified Public Accountant until he joined his family's business at Niello Auto Group in 1974 and spent the next 25 years running retail automobile dealerships with his family partners. In 1995, Niello served as the President of the Sacramento Metropolitan Chamber of Commerce and was a member of the Capital Area Political Action Committee. As a member of the community, he was an active volunteer.

Niello was elected to the Sacramento County Board of Supervisors in a special election in February 1999. As a member of the Board of Supervisors, he served Sacramento County on numerous boards and commissions.

In 2004, Niello was elected to the California State Assembly and was immediately appointed Vice Chair of the Assembly Banking and Finance Committee and also served in positions on the Assembly Budget, and Transportation Committees. In addition, he served for a brief time on the Assembly Public Employees, Retirement and Social Security Committee and the Joint Legislative Audit Committee. In late 2006, Niello was named vice-chair of the Assembly Budget Committee and serves as the key negotiator on budget issues for the Assembly Republican Caucus.

Niello was elected to the State Senate in 2022, representing the 6th district in the California State Assembly, which includes the Sacramento County communities of Arden Arcade, Carmichael, the City of Citrus Heights, Fair Oaks, the City of Folsom, North Highlands, McClellan Park, Orangevale, Natomas, Sacramento and the Placer County community of Granite Bay, Roseville, Rocklin, Loomis, and Lincoln.

== Legislation ==
Niello has worked on legislation to allow individuals to remove racially charged language from a homeowner's CC&Rs, a measure to assist local governments in cracking down on illegal dumping, and a bill to ban county retired annuitants from collecting unemployment and retirement pension benefits. He introduced legislation to authorize the state to participate in Public-Private Partnerships for infrastructure projects, and legislation to reform contracting of public infrastructure. He introduced measures to reduce unfunded mandates on local government and overhaul the state's unclaimed property program to return unclaimed property to its owners in a timely manner and provide interest payments on property held by the state. He authored legislation transferring the responsibility for writing initiative ballot titles from the partisan Attorney General's office to the non-partisan Legislative Analyst's Office.

== Electoral history ==
1999 Sacramento County Board of Supervisors 4th district special election
Party	Candidate	Votes	%
Nonpartisan	Roger Niello	11,100	55.4
Nonpartisan	Tom Aceituno	5,285	26.4
Nonpartisan	Jim Delk	2,375	11.9
Nonpartisan	Douglas Stevens	700	3.5
Nonpartisan	A. A. Manansala	578	2.9
Total votes		20,038	100.0

2000 Sacramento County Board of Supervisors 4th district election
Party	Candidate	Votes	%
Nonpartisan	Roger Niello (incumbent)	43,471	66.4
Nonpartisan	Douglas Stevens	11,039	16.9
Nonpartisan	Tony Russell	10,973	16.8
Total votes		65,483	100.0

2004 California State Assembly 5th district election
Primary election
Party	Candidate	Votes	%
Republican	Roger Niello	44,469	86.8
Republican	Michael A. Fox	6,785	13.2
Total votes		51,254	100.0
General election
Republican	Roger Niello	104,895	60.3
Democratic	Sandra A. Carey	62,710	36.0
Libertarian	Melissa Manfre	6,524	3.7
Total votes		174,129	100.0
Republican hold			

2006 California State Assembly 5th district election
Primary election
Party	Candidate	Votes	%
Republican	Roger Niello (incumbent)	32,999	100.0
Total votes		32,999	100.0
General election
Republican	Roger Niello (incumbent)	84,334	61.7
Democratic	Brandon Bell	48,325	35.4
Peace and Freedom	Mike Lopez	4,068	2.9
Total votes		136,727	100.0
Republican hold			

2008 California State Assembly 5th district election
Primary election
Party	Candidate	Votes	%
Republican	Roger Niello (incumbent)	27,166	83.8
Republican	Doug Husen	3,832	11.8
Republican	Donald Thompson	1,434	4.4
Total votes		32,432	100.0
General election
Republican	Roger Niello (incumbent)	101,888	54.3
Democratic	Dan Leahy	71,733	38.1
Peace and Freedom	Karen Martinez	14,295	7.6
Total votes		187,916	100.0
Republican hold			

2022 California State Senate 6th district election
Primary election
Party	Candidate	Votes	%
Democratic	Paula Villescaz	105,719	43.1
Republican	Roger Niello	104,883	42.8
Republican	Michael J. Huang	34,604	14.1
Total votes		245,206	100.0
General election
Republican	Roger Niello	202,569	55.7
Democratic	Paula Villescaz	160,846	44.3
Total votes		363,415	100.0
Republican gain from Democratic			
