= Richard Pan =

American politician (born 1965)

- Pan in 2014

Member-elect of the U.S. House of Representatives from California's 6th district
- Assuming office January 3, 2027
- Succeeding: Kevin Kiley

Member of the California State Senate from the 6th district
- In office December 1, 2014 – December 5, 2022
- Preceded by: Darrell Steinberg
- Succeeded by: Roger Niello

Member of the California State Assembly from the 9th district
- In office December 3, 2012 – November 30, 2014
- Preceded by: Roger Dickinson (redistricted)
- Succeeded by: Jim Cooper

Member of the California State Assembly from the 5th district
- In office December 6, 2010 – November 30, 2012
- Preceded by: Roger Niello
- Succeeded by: Frank Bigelow (redistricted)

Personal details
- Born: Richard Juien-Dah Pan; October 28, 1965 (age 61) Yonkers, New York, U.S.
- Party: Democratic
- Spouse: Wen Li-Wang
- Children: 2
- Education: Johns Hopkins University (BS); University of Pittsburgh (MD); Harvard University (MPH)
- Website: Campaign website

Chinese name
- Traditional Chinese: 潘君達
- Simplified Chinese: 潘君达
- Hanyu Pinyin: Pān Jūndá

Richard Juien-Dah Pan (born October 28, 1965) is an American Democratic politician and physician who served in the California State Senate from 2014 to 2022, representing the 6th Senate district, which encompassed parts of Sacramento and Yolo counties. He is a practicing pediatrician and professor at the University of California, Davis. He is the U.S. representative-elect for California's 6th congressional district, having defeated incumbent Kevin Kiley in the 2026 election.

== Early life and education ==
Pan was born to a Taiwanese American immigrant family in Yonkers, New York. He was raised in the Pittsburgh, Pennsylvania suburb of Mt. Lebanon. After graduating from Mt. Lebanon High School, he earned a bachelor's degree from Johns Hopkins University, a Doctor of Medicine from the University of Pittsburgh, and a Master of Public Health from Harvard University. He completed his pediatric residency at Massachusetts General Hospital also serving as Chief Resident and a fellowship at Children's Hospital Boston in child advocacy and primary care research.

Pan was a professor at the University of California, Davis where he led the pediatric residency program and founded Communities and Physicians Together, a service learning curriculum that placed physicians-in-training with community settings to learn about social determinants of health.

== Political career ==
Prior to being elected to the State Senate in 2014, he was a member of the California State Assembly representing the 5th Assembly District, and after the 2010 redistricting, the 9th Assembly District. Pan was Chair of the California Asian American & Pacific Islander Legislative Caucus from 2020–2022.

Following a measles outbreak that began in California and infected 131 people, Pan and Senator Ben Allen introduced California Senate Bill 277 in 2015, which eliminated philosophical and religious beliefs exemptions to vaccine requirements for California school children. The bill passed and was signed into law by Governor Jerry Brown. Pan authored laws to expand newborn screening for severe combined immunodeficiency syndrome (AB395 in 2011), adrenoleukodystrophy (AB1559 in 2014) and all conditions recommended by the federal DHHS Recommended Universal Screening Panel (SB1095 in 2016). Pan authored legislation to extend the California Children's Services Program managed care carve-out (AB301 in 2011) and to establish the Medi-Cal Children's Health Advisory Board to guide Medi-Cal policy affecting children (AB357 in 2014). In 2021 he authored a law (SB 742) that makes illegal to "harass, intimidate, injure or obstruct" people who are on their way to get a vaccination; the law was inspired by an incident in January when protesters targeted and briefly shut down a mass vaccination site in Los Angeles.

In 2022, together with Senator Scott Wiener, Pan introduced Senate Bill 866, which would have allowed minors aged 15 and older to give consent to receive FDA-approved vaccinations for themselves. The bill did not become law.

Pan announced that he would run for mayor of Sacramento in June 2023. He dropped out of the race after coming in third in the March 5, 2024 primary.

On October 14, 2025, Pan announced his intention to run for Congress. Following the passage of Proposition 50, Pan announced his candidacy for the 2026 election in the 6th district on November 5. He advanced to the general election after placing second in the primary on June 9, 2026. Pan defeated incumbent Kevin Kiley, who ran as an independent, in the November 3, 2026 general election.

== Personal life ==
Pan is married to Wen Li-Wang, who is a dentist. They live in Sacramento, California, and have two children.

== Electoral history ==
Electoral history of Richard Pan
Year	Office		Party	Primary			General			Result	Swing	Ref.
Year	Office		Party	Total	%	P.	Total	%	P.	Result	Swing	Ref.
2026	U.S. House	6th	Democratic	45,008	23.17	2nd	Counting ongoing			Won	—	
Source: Secretary of State of California | Statewide Election Results

U.S. House of Representatives
Preceded by Kevin Kiley	Member-elect of the U.S. House of Representatives from California's 6th congressional district Taking office 2027	Elect
