= Lorna Jean Moorhead =

- Born: November 5, 1975 (age 51); Carmichael, California, U.S.
- Occupation: Author
- Writing career
- Genres: Multiple sclerosis Health advocacy
- Notable works: Coffee in the Cereal: The First Year with Multiple Sclerosis, Phone in the Fridge: Five Years with Multiple Sclerosis

Lorna Jean Moorhead (born November 5, 1975) is an American author, health columnist and health advocate. She is one of the first writers on the subject of women's health issues pertaining to multiple sclerosis.

== Biography ==
Moorhead was born in Carmichael, California. Her mother served as a member of the California State Assembly.

At the age of 23, she was diagnosed with relapsing remitting multiple sclerosis.

Moorhead is the author of two books, Coffee in the Cereal: The First Year with Multiple Sclerosis (2002) and Phone in the Fridge: Five Years with Multiple Sclerosis (2006), as well as many articles and blogs concerning multiple sclerosis and health advocacy.

In 2009, Moorhead was showcased in Hoi Polli II in recognition of her literary accomplishments.

Moorhead's books are recommended for MS patients by the Christopher & Dana Reeve Foundation Paralysis Resource Center, Multiple Sclerosis Society of Canada BC Division and many other MS related organizations.

Her book Coffee in the Cereal was required reading for a class at Stanford University.

=== Health Advocacy ===
In 2000, she founded MS MOMS, "a California non-profit organization for women and mothers with Multiple Sclerosis". She was motivated to establish MS MOMS was a lack of support for parents with Multiple Sclerosis. She requested support from the National Multiple Sclerosis Society, though they did not have any programs specifically designed to assist with women's issues, parenting with multiple sclerosis, or maintaining relationships at the time. MS MOMS commonly participates with Renaissance fairs for fundraising and advertising.

In addition to founding MS MOMS, Moorhead has written many articles.

=== Published articles ===
- Herbs for Multiple Sclerosis: Catnip, Chamomile, and Cayenne Can Help Ease Symptoms
- Explaining Illness to Your Children
- HealingWell.com Articles"
  - Herbs for MS
  - MS: The Silent Partner
  - Telling Your Kids You Have MS
  - A Woman's Touch: MS and Femininity
  - Slurry Speech and MS

=== Coffee in the Cereal: The First Year with Multiple Sclerosis ===
Coffee in the Cereal: The First Year with Multiple Sclerosis was first published in 2002 by Pathfinder Publishing. It was later edited and republished in 2003. It was edited again and had a significant update of content, as well as a new ISBN, in 2010.

Lorna began writing Coffee in the Cereal in 2001. She had already successfully published multiple articles and had a "burning desire" to write a book about learning to live with Multiple Sclerosis. She focused the content of the book on the issues she experienced within her first year of having Multiple Sclerosis.

=== Phone in the Fridge: Five Years with Multiple Sclerosis ===
Phone in the Fridge: Five Years with Multiple Sclerosis was first published in 2006 by Pathfinder Publishing.
