= Rico Oller =

American politician from California (1958–2025)

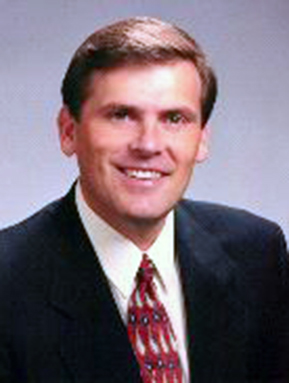

Member of the California Senate from the 1st district
- In office December 4, 2000 – November 30, 2004
- Preceded by: Tim Leslie
- Succeeded by: Dave Cox

Member of the California State Assembly from the 4th district
- In office December 2, 1996 – November 30, 2000
- Preceded by: David Knowles
- Succeeded by: Tim Leslie

Personal details
- Born: July 16, 1958 Fresno, California, U.S.
- Died: September 12, 2025 (aged 67) San Andreas, California, U.S.
- Party: Republican
- Spouse: Londa
- Children: 4

Thomas "Rico" Oller (July 16, 1958 – September 12, 2025) was an American politician from California. A Republican, he served in the California State Assembly, representing the 4th District from 1996 to 2000, and the California State Senate, representing the 1st district from 2000 to 2004.

== Background ==
Born in Fresno, California, Oller graduated from California State University, Stanislaus in 1980. In 1981, Oller started his building materials business. He died in San Andreas, California, on September 12, 2025, at the age of 67.

== Political career ==
In 2004, Oller ran for Congress in California's 3rd congressional district, but narrowly lost the Republican primary to former California Attorney General Dan Lungren. On January 10, 2008, Oller again ran for Congress, this time in California's 4th congressional district, for a seat being vacated by retiring Congressman John Doolittle. He faced opposition from former Congressman Doug Ose. On March 4, 2008, Oller dropped out of the race when California State Senator Tom McClintock (R-Thousand Oaks) announced that he was running for Doolittle's seat. In a statement, Oller said his decision was "a bitter pill indeed for me to swallow." But, he said he was endorsing McClintock to prevent the election of Ose, whom he labeled as "an unarguably liberal Republican." Oller ran for the newly former 5th Assembly District in 2012, facing Madera County Supervisor Frank Bigelow in the November general election. Oller lost to Bigelow by 5.7% in an upset.

== Legislative record ==
Oller fought against the expansion of Smog Check II and authored legislation to abolish the program. He opposed the use of MTBE (methyl tertiary-butyl ether) in fuel. He also passed legislation to protect the endangered Sierra Nevada bighorn sheep. He convened an oversight hearing into the spread of noxious weeds across California and carried legislation to promote the reactivation of the Auburn Dam.

Oller was named Legislator of the Year by California Small Business Association and American Electronics Association. He also received an award from Women's Safety Alliance for dedication to safety and the 2000 "Defender of Freedom" award from the National Rifle Association of America.

California Senate
| Preceded by Tim Leslie | California State Senator; 1st district December 4, 2000 – November 30, 2004 | Succeeded by Dave Cox |
California Assembly
| Preceded by David Knowles | California State Assemblyman; 4th district December 2, 1996 – November 30, 2000 | Succeeded by Tim Leslie |
