= Big Sur Multi-Agency Advisory Council =

Local council in Big Sur, California

The Big Sur Multi-Agency Advisory Council was formed in 1986 to provide citizens with the opportunity to communicate with public agencies about their activities in the Big Sur area. The council is composed of citizen and agency representatives, and local, state, and federal elected officials in the Big Sur area. Meetings occur once a quarter at the Big Sur Lodge Conference Room. Members are residents and business owners in the Big Sur region of California. Member agencies include the Big Sur Chamber of Commerce, Coast Property Owners' Association, Monterey County Planning Department, Monterey County Board of Supervisors, Monterey Peninsula Regional Park District, California Coastal Commission, Caltrans, California Department of Parks and Recreation, Monterey Bay National Marine Sanctuary, United States Forest Service, State Assembly member Robert Rivas, State Senator Bill Monning, and Congressman Jimmy Panetta.

The organization works to resolve issues like the lack of rest rooms along the coast, illegal camping and fires, traffic, and inadequate cell phone service. The lack of cell phone service figured in the drowning of 18-year-old Braxton Stuntz of Carmel when he fell into a blow hole at Garrapata State Park in January, 2019. Witnesses were unable to contact emergency services. Stuntz' father told news media that the lack of cell phone service "significantly hampered the recovery efforts." Sean James, the Monterey Sector superintendent for California State Parks, confirmed that visitors may be unaware of the lack of cell service while expecting to be able to contact emergency services.
