= John Laird (American politician) =

American politician (born 1950)

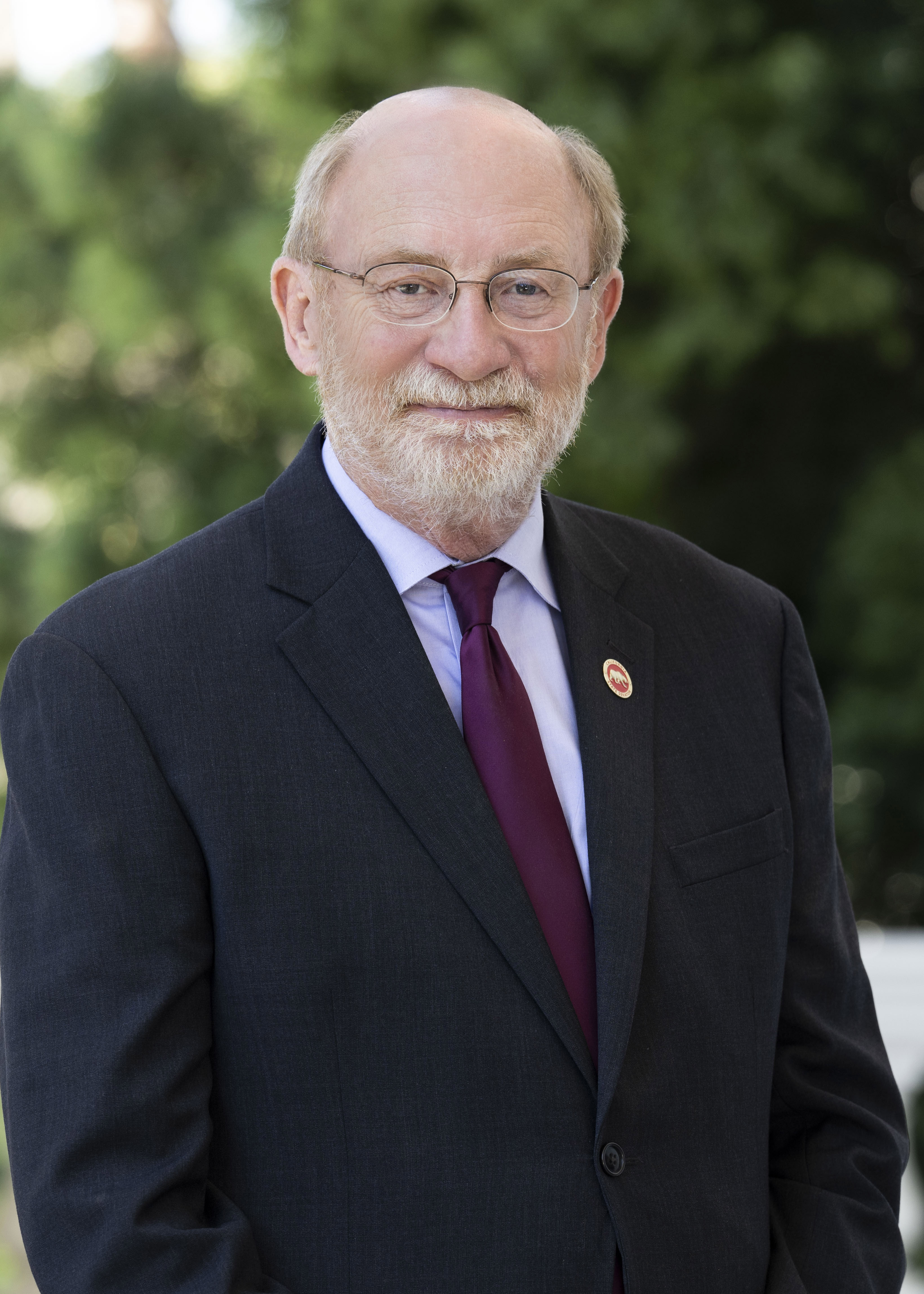
- Official portrait, 2023

Member of the California Senate from the 17th district
- Incumbent
- Assumed office December 7, 2020
- Preceded by: Bill Monning

Secretary of the California Natural Resources Agency
- In office January 5, 2011 – January 11, 2019
- Governor: Jerry Brown
- Preceded by: Lester Snow
- Succeeded by: Wade Crowfoot

Member of the California State Assembly from the 27th district
- In office December 2, 2002 – November 30, 2008
- Preceded by: Fred Keeley
- Succeeded by: Bill Monning

Mayor of Santa Cruz
- In office 1987–1988
- Preceded by: Jane Weed
- Succeeded by: Mardi Wormhoudt
- In office 1983–1984
- Preceded by: Bruce van Allen
- Succeeded by: Mardi Wormhoudt

Personal details
- Born: March 29, 1950 (age 76) Santa Rosa, California, U.S.
- Party: Democratic
- Other political affiliations: Democratic Socialists of America (c. 1980s)
- Spouse: John Flores
- Education: University of California Santa Cruz
- Website: Laird for Senate

John Laird (born March 29, 1950) is an American politician serving as a member of the California State Senate for the 17th district. A Democrat, Laird was secretary of the California Natural Resources Agency from 2011 to 2019 and represented the 27th district in the California State Assembly from 2002 to 2008. The 27th district included parts of Santa Clara, Santa Cruz and Monterey counties.

Laird, along with Mark Leno of San Francisco, was one of the first two openly gay men to serve in the California Legislature. In 1983, Laird became one of the United States' first openly gay mayors, when he took over the mayoralty of the city of Santa Cruz, California.

== Early life and education ==
Laird was born in Santa Rosa, California, and raised in Vallejo, California. His parents were both educators. He graduated from Adlai Stevenson College of the University of California, Santa Cruz in 1972 with an A.B. in politics. His undergraduate thesis was on the history of water development in California.

== Career ==
Laird served for two years on the district staff of United States Representative Jerome Waldie and worked during the summer of 1974 for Representative Bill Gunter of Florida in his run for the U.S. Senate. Laird then returned to Santa Cruz and joined the staff of the Santa Cruz County Administrator in 1974. He also served in the personnel and social services departments.

=== Santa Cruz City Council and mayor ===
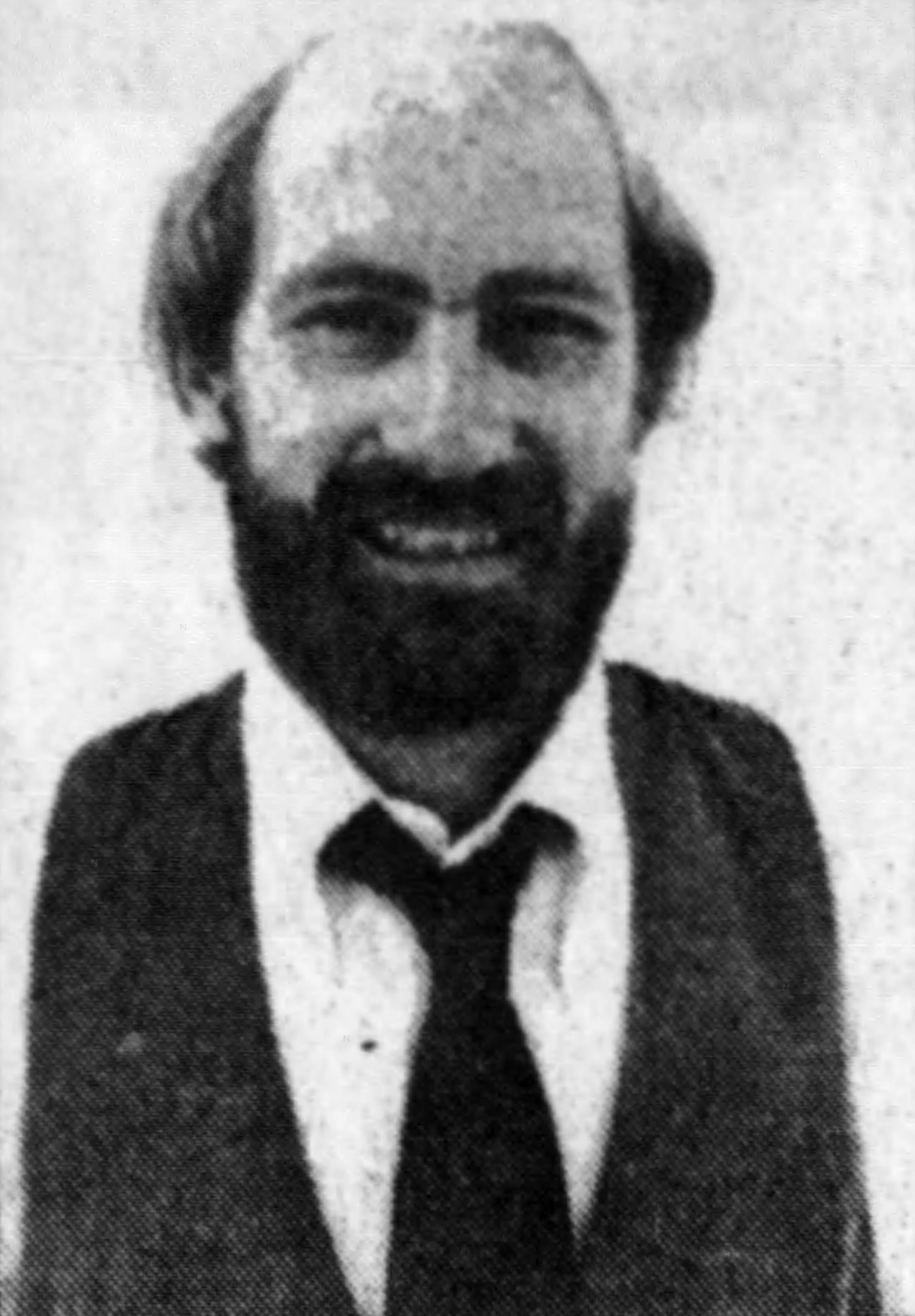
Laird c. 1981

In 1981, Laird received the most votes in a field of eight for a seat on the Santa Cruz City Council. He was re-elected as top vote-getter in 1985, serving until term limits ended his Council service in 1990. Laird was elected by the council to one-year terms as mayor in 1983–84 and 1987–88. During his time on the council, he worked with the environmental organization Save Our Shores to lead local governments in the fight against proposed offshore oil drilling and in favor of the designation of the Monterey Bay National Marine Sanctuary.

Around this time, he was a member of the Democratic Socialist Organizing Committee and its successor, the Democratic Socialists of America, although he "abhor[ed] labels" and preferred the term "progressive" to describe himself.

=== California State Assembly ===
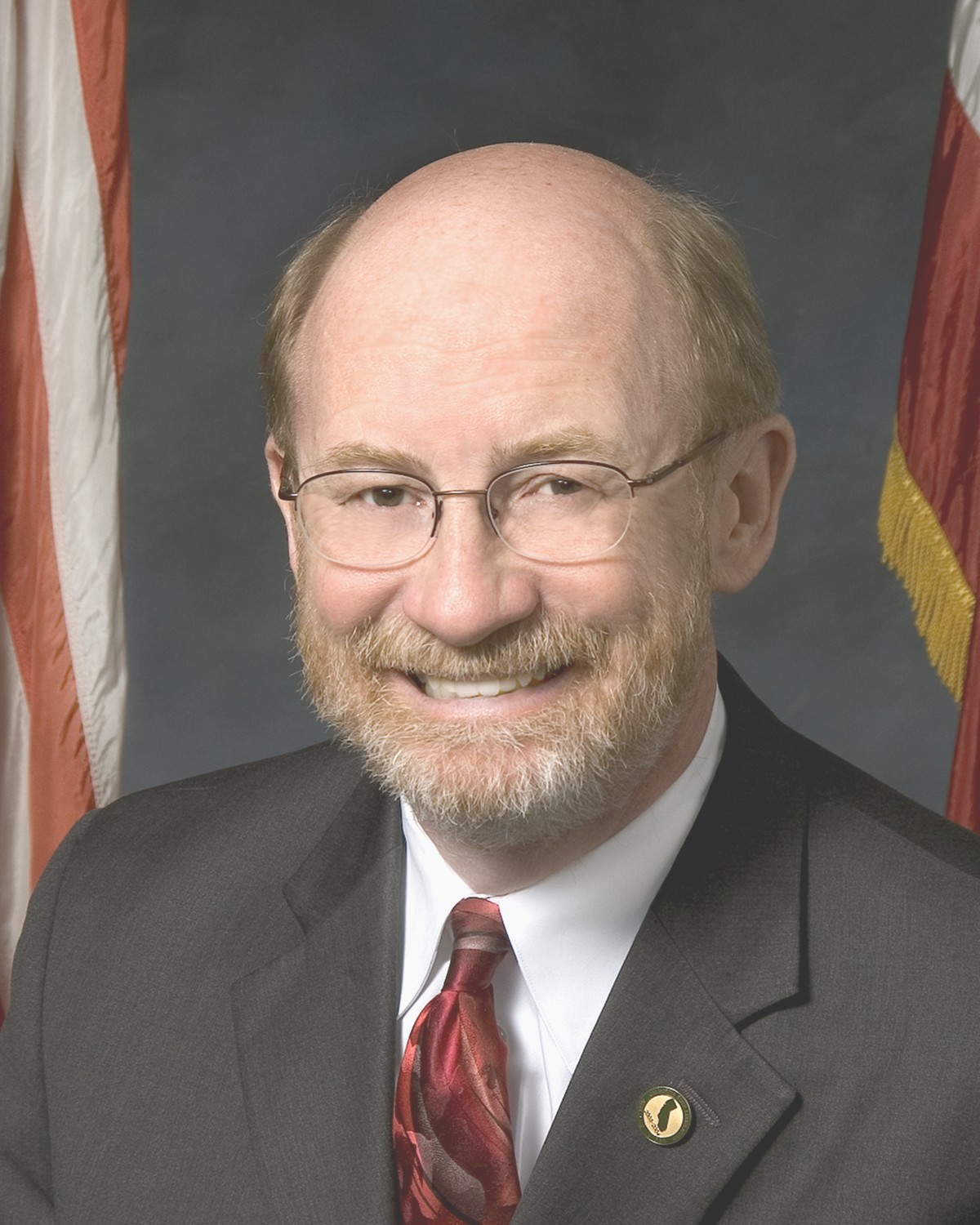
Portrait of Laird during his tenure in the State Assembly

He ran unopposed in the 2002 Democratic primary and easily won election to the California Assembly. Laird was re-elected to the Assembly in 2004 and 2006 before being termed out in 2008. While serving the maximum three terms in the Assembly, Laird authored 82 bills that were signed into law.

Over the years, his election campaigns have often won the backing of the Gay & Lesbian Victory Fund.

=== 2010 State Senate run ===
Laird ran for the 15th district California State Senate seat previously held by Republican Abel Maldonado, whom Governor Arnold Schwarzenegger appointed lieutenant governor in November 2009. He lost to Republican state Assemblyman Sam Blakeslee in a special primary on June 22, 2010, and (when neither won a majority in the primary) subsequently in the special general election on August 17, 2010. Laird trailed Blakeslee by a 7.59% margin in the primary and lost by a 3.93% margin in the general.

=== California resources secretary ===
Laird was appointed by Governor Jerry Brown on January 5, 2011, as California's secretary for natural resources. In the Brown administration, Laird oversaw a $10 billion budget and 25 statewide departments, commissions and conservancies. He served in this post throughout Brown's last two of four terms as governor (2011–2019).

=== California State Senate ===
In January 2019, Laird announced his intention to run for the 17th district in 2020. He pledged to focus on a range of issues if elected, from managing the impact of climate change and wildfires, to protecting California's ocean policies, supporting the middle class and expanding access to health care, education and affordable housing. Laird was elected on November 3, 2020, after defeating Republican Vicki Nohrden, 64.7% to 35.3%.

During his first term (2020–2024), Laird authored 59 bills signed into law – addressing fentanyl overdose reversal drugs, survival benefits for families of fallen officers, services for foster youth who attend community college, support for older Californians living with HIV, and protections against excessive rents for mobile home residents, and requiring propane cylinders sold in the state to be refillable or reusable by 2028.

In December 2021, the California Citizens Redistricting Commission adopted new state Assembly and Senate district maps. The redrawn 17th Senate District spans the northern Central Coast, including the entirety of Santa Cruz, San Benito and Monterey counties and most of San Luis Obispo County. Previously, District 17 included sections of Santa Clara County and did not include San Benito County or the Salinas Valley.

On March 7, 2023, Laird announced his campaign for a second term in the state Senate.

==== 2024 State Senate campaign ====
In November 2024, Laird was re-elected to the state Senate with 67.4% of the vote to 32.6% for Republican Tony Virrueta. Laird was sworn in on December 2, 2024, to what will be his last term in the Senate due to term limits.

=== Community activism ===
Laird has been active in the Santa Cruz community, serving as vice chair of the City Charter Review Committee, a founder of the Santa Cruz Community Credit Union, and a board member of the Santa Cruz Area Chamber of Commerce. He has been active on a variety of community boards.

He has been active with the LGBTQ+ community, as a columnist for the Lavender Reader, a commentator on "Closet Free Radio" on UC Santa Cruz's KZSC station, and a founding member of the International Network of Gay and Lesbian Officials, and was an original board member of BAYMEC, the gay and lesbian political action committee for Monterey, San Mateo, Santa Clara, and Santa Cruz counties. In the Assembly, he chaired the California Legislative LGBT Caucus.

Laird was a founding member of the Santa Cruz AIDS Project. He served as its executive director from 1991 to 1994. He also has served on the Santa Cruz Community Foundation's Advisory Committee for the Lesbian and Gay Grants Partnership.

Laird was an elected member of the Cabrillo College Board of Trustees from 1994 to 2002.

== Personal life ==
Laird has been a long-time resident of Santa Cruz with his spouse John Flores. He is fluent in Spanish.

== Electoral history ==
=== California State Assembly ===
2002 California State Assembly 27th district election
Primary election
| Party | Candidate | Votes | % |
|---|---|---|---|
| Democratic | John Laird | 39,684 | 100.0 |
| Total votes | | 39,684 | 100.0 |
General election
| Democratic | John Laird | 77,212 | 61.4 |
| Republican | Chuck Carter | 44,444 | 35.2 |
| Libertarian | Gordon Sachtjen | 4,294 | 3.4 |
| Total votes | | 125,950 | 100.0 |
| Democratic hold | | | |

2004 California State Assembly 27th district election
Primary election
| Party | Candidate | Votes | % |
|---|---|---|---|
| Democratic | John Laird (incumbent) | 55,231 | 100.0 |
| Total votes | | 55,231 | 100.0 |
General election
| Democratic | John Laird (incumbent) | 129,410 | 68.7 |
| Republican | Jack D. Barlich | 59,076 | 31.3 |
| Total votes | | 188,486 | 100.0 |
| Democratic hold | | | |

2006 California State Assembly 27th district election
Primary election
| Party | Candidate | Votes | % |
|---|---|---|---|
| Democratic | John Laird (incumbent) | 45,360 | 100.0 |
| Total votes | | 45,360 | 100.0 |
General election
| Democratic | John Laird (incumbent) | 99,530 | 70.2 |
| Republican | Michael Morrison | 42,411 | 29.8 |
| Total votes | | 141,941 | 100.0 |
| Democratic hold | | | |

=== California State Senate ===
2020 California State Senate 17th district election
Primary election
| Party | Candidate | Votes | % |
|---|---|---|---|
| Democratic | John Laird | 138,986 | 44.4 |
| Republican | Vicki Nohrden | 98,649 | 31.5 |
| Democratic | Maria Cadenas | 65,525 | 20.9 |
| Democratic | John M. Nevill | 10,040 | 3.2 |
| Total votes | | 313,200 | 100.0 |
General election
| Democratic | John Laird | 320,090 | 64.7 |
| Republican | Vicki Nohrden | 174,587 | 35.3 |
| Total votes | | 494,677 | 100.0 |
| Democratic hold | | | |

2024 California State Senate 17th district election
Primary election
| Party | Candidate | Votes | % |
|---|---|---|---|
| Democratic | John Laird (incumbent) | 143,912 | 64.5 |
| Republican | Tony Virrueta | 48,829 | 21.9 |
| Republican | Eric Tao | 25,845 | 11.6 |
| Libertarian | Michael Oxford | 4,591 | 2.1 |
| Total votes | | 223,177 | 100.0 |
General election
| Democratic | John Laird (incumbent) | 269,862 | 65.0 |
| Republican | Tony Virrueta | 144,992 | 35.0 |
| Total votes | | 414,854 | 100.0 |
| Democratic hold | | | |

== Footnotes ==
Political offices
| Preceded by Bruce Van Allen | Mayor of Santa Cruz; 1983–1984 | Succeeded by Mardi Wormhoudt |
| Preceded by Jane Weed | Mayor of Santa Cruz; 1987–1988 | Succeeded by Mardi Wormhoudt |
California Assembly
| Preceded by Fred Keeley | California State Assembly, District 27; 2002–2008 | Succeeded by Bill Monning |
