= California's 53rd district =

California's 53rd district may refer to:

- California's 53rd congressional district
- California's 53rd State Assembly district
