= George Runner =

American politician (born 1952)

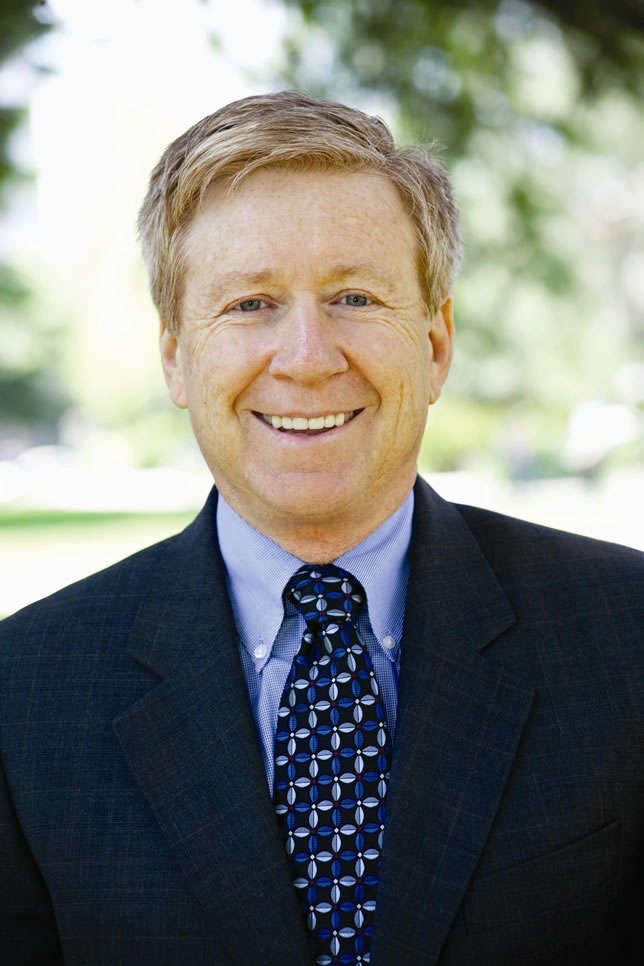
- Official portrait, 2011

Member of the California State Board of Equalization
- In office January 3, 2011 – January 7, 2019
- Preceded by: Sean Wallentine
- Succeeded by: Ted Gaines
- Constituency: 1st district (2015–2019); 2nd district (2011–2015)

California State Senate Republican Caucus Chair
- In office December 17, 2004 – July 31, 2009
- Preceded by: Chuck Poochigian
- Succeeded by: Bob Huff

Member of the California Senate from the 17th district
- In office December 6, 2004 – December 21, 2010
- Preceded by: Pete Knight
- Succeeded by: Sharon Runner

Member of the California State Assembly from the 36th district
- In office December 2, 1996 – December 2, 2002
- Preceded by: Pete Knight
- Succeeded by: Sharon Runner

Personal details
- Born: March 25, 1952 (age 74) Scotia, New York, U.S.
- Party: Republican
- Spouse: Sharon Yvonne Oden (m. 1973; died 2016)
- Children: Micah, Rebekah
- Website: Official website

George C. Runner Jr. (born March 25, 1952) is an American politician from California who served on the California State Board of Equalization, the only publicly elected tax commission in the United States. A Republican, he represented the Board's 2nd District from 2011 to 2015 and the renumbered 1st District from 2015 to 2019.

From 2004 to 2010, he was a California State Senator representing the 17th Senate District, and was the Republican Caucus Chair (the Senate's second-highest Republican leadership post) from 2004 to 2009. From 1996 to 2002, he was a California State Assemblyman representing the 36th Assembly District, which at the time consisted of portions of Los Angeles County.

== Early life ==
Born in Scotia, New York, Runner moved with his family to Lancaster, California as a young child. After attending local public schools in Lancaster, Runner earned a Bachelor's Degree in Business Management from the University of Redlands and a graduate certificate in Management from Azusa Pacific University.

== Private school founding ==
With his wife Sharon, George Runner founded the Desert Christian Schools.

We wanted a school for not only everyone else's children, but for our own children, where we knew they were going to hear about God in an exciting way; a place where their faith was not just some parallel subject matter, but was integrated effectively throughout history, math, science and English.

== Local politics ==
In 1992, Runner was elected to the Lancaster City Council. He served as Lancaster's Vice Mayor from 1994–95 and as Mayor of Lancaster from 1995 to 1996. During his mayoral term, the California Business Journal named Lancaster the number one mid-size city with which to do business.

== Legislative politics ==
In 1996, Runner was elected to represent the 36th Assembly District and served in the State Assembly for three terms, from 1996 to 2002. During this time of service, Runner served as Vice Chair of the Assembly Budget Committee.

In 2004, he was elected to the Senate to represent the 17th Senate District.

Runner served in 2007-2008 as the Chair of the Senate Republican Caucus. He also served as Vice Chair of the Senate Banking, Finance, and Insurance Committee, Vice Chair of the Senate Environmental Quality Committee, and as a member of the Senate Appropriations Committee, Senate Revenue and Taxation Committee, and the Senate Select Committee on Defense and Aerospace Industries.

During his legislative career, Runner was named Legislator of the Year by:

- The California State Sheriffs Association
- Crime Victims United
- California Sexual Assault Investigators Association
- Coalition of Chief Probation Officers
- California Coalition of Directors of Environmental Health
- California Community College Trustees
- California Building Industry Association

He also received the Pursuit of Justice Award from the Association of Deputy District Attorneys–Los Angeles County.

=== Amber alert ===
In 2002, Runner authored California's Amber alert system, which has successfully utilized the Emergency Alert System to involve the general public in the search for abducted children and has aided in numerous successful parent-child reunions.

=== Jessica's Law ===
In 2006, along with his wife, then-Assemblywoman Sharon Runner, George Runner authored Proposition 83, California's version of Jessica's Law. The measure passed with the support of 71% of California voters, and passed in 57 of California's 58 counties.

Jessica's Law ensures that all sexual offenders who are convicted of activity with children under the age of 14 are put into a prison with a mandatory minimum sentence of 15 years or 25 years to life. It eliminates all "first-offense" sexual offense provisions from California law.

It also eliminates all "good-time" credits for sexual offenders serving prison terms; under the authored provisions they are required to serve their entire sentence and will not be released for good behavior. The law requires that sex offenders who are released from prison wear a GPS bracelet for life. It also creates a 2,000-foot (615 meter) zone around schools and parks in which registered sex offenders are prohibited from residing.

=== Ronald Reagan Day ===
On February 3, 2010, Runner introduced SB 944, the nation's first Ronald Reagan Day legislation.

On July 19, 2010, Governor Arnold Schwarzenegger signed the bill into law, making California the first state in the union to have a permanent Ronald Reagan Day. Ronald Reagan Day would be celebrated each February 6 as a "day of special significance" in California, which would not be a state holiday, nor would give any workers a day off, but rather would be a day that schools "are encouraged to conduct exercises remembering the life of Ronald Reagan, recognizing his accomplishments, and familiarizing pupils with the contributions he made" to California. Ronald Reagan Day is California's third day of special significance honoring a specific person, after John Muir Day, and Harvey Milk Day.

=== Blue Alert ===
In 2010, Runner authored California's Blue Alert system, which authorizes the California Highway Patrol to use the Emergency Alert System when a peace officer has been killed, seriously wounded, or assaulted with a deadly weapon.

== Taxpayer advocacy ==
Since 2009, Runner has served with Americans for Prosperity as a taxpayer advocate on local tax issues in California.

== Board of Equalization ==
In February 2009, Runner announced his candidacy for the District 2 seat on the Board of Equalization (BOE).

In his bid for the Republican nomination for the BOE, Runner was endorsed by the Howard Jarvis Taxpayers Association, the California Republican Assembly, the Santa Clarita Valley Tea Party, radio talk show hosts John and Ken, former Governor Pete Wilson, and former Republican Gubernatorial Nominee Bill Simon, among others.

Runner won the Republican nomination for BOE after defeating Assemblyman Alan Nakanishi and incumbent BOE Member Barbara Alby in the June 2010 primary. Runner is the first person to defeat an incumbent BOE member's reelection bid since 1978 and only the fifth person to do so in California history. Runner won the November 2010 general election for the seat, defeating Democrat tax attorney Chris Parker. Alby inexplicably resigned on December 31, 2010, four days before Runner was to be sworn in.

Consequently, Runner's Chief of Staff, Sean Wallentine, was sworn in as acting BOE Member until Runner could be sworn in on January 3, 2011, at which point Wallentine became Runner's Chief Deputy at the BOE.

During his time on the Board, Runner has sought to improve California's tax policies and practices and to create and retain more private sector jobs in that state. Among his accomplishments, Runner cites helping end a requirement that new businesses provide a security deposit to the Board, resulting in the return of hundreds of millions of dollars' worth of security back to business owners; leading a successful effort to reform an inefficient use tax collection program aimed at small businesses; and clarifying that farmers who purchase solar equipment are eligible for the same tax exemptions as those who purchase diesel generators.

Runner is a leader in the fight against the state's controversial fire tax; he supports a class action lawsuit that seeks to overturn the tax and return millions of dollars back to taxpayers.

In February 2014, Runner announced that he would seek re-election to a second term, citing early endorsements from Congressman and Majority Whip Kevin McCarthy, the Howard Jarvis Taxpayers Association, the California Association of Highway Patrolmen, CDF Firefighters, among others.

As a result of redistricting, he ran in the first district, which was being vacated by Democrat Betty Yee. He easily won re-election, besting Democrat Chris Parker by wide margins in both the June primary and November general elections. Democrat Fiona Ma won his seat in the second district.

In February 2018, his colleagues selected him to serve as the Board's Chairman.

== Family ==
He married Sharon Yvonne Oden in 1973. She succeeded him as the 36th District Assemblymember in 2002. Senator George Runner and Assemblywoman Sharon Runner were the first husband and wife to serve concurrently in the California State Legislature, doing so from 2004 to 2008. She succeeded him as Senator in 2011. Sharon Runner died at her home on July 14, 2016, due to "respiratory complications." She was survived by her husband, two children (Micah and Rebekah (who serves in the U.S. Coast Guard) and their spouses, and four grandchildren.

Major League Baseball player Casey Fien is Runner's nephew.

Political offices
Preceded by William J. "Pete" Knight	California State Assemblymember; 36th District; December 2, 1996 – November 30, 2002	Succeeded by Sharon Runner
Preceded by William J. "Pete" Knight	California State Senator; 17th District; December 6, 2004 – December 21, 2010	Succeeded by Sharon Runner
Preceded by Sean Wallentine	California State Board of Equalization; Board Member; January 3, 2011 – January 9, 2019	Succeeded by Ted Gaines
