= Trinity Classical Academy =

Location
- Santa Clarita, California 91355; United States
- 34.4505°N 118.5788°W

Information
- Type: Private, classical Christian
- Established: 2001
- Head of School: Liz Caddow
- Grades: K–12
- Enrollment: 506
- Athletics conference: CIF Southern Section; Heritage League
- Team name: Knights
- Website: www.trinityclassicalacademy.com

Trinity Classical Academy is a classical Christian school in Valencia, Santa Clarita, California. It was founded in 2001 and offers education for K-12. It is committed to teaching a Christian worldview in all subject areas, and upholds biblical inerrancy in its statement of faith.

Trinity Classical Academy is accredited by the Western Association of Schools and Colleges, and is a member of the Association of Classical and Christian Schools. It claims to be the "fastest growing classical, Christian school" in the United States.

The Trinity Knights compete in the Heritage League of the CIF-SS. The girls' basketball team won the 5-A state championship in 2021. Former San Francisco Giants catcher Trevor Brown is coach of the baseball team.

In 2021 and 2022 Trinity was fined by the Los Angeles County Department of Public Health for not following COVID-19 regulations: once for allowing maskless students to engage in outdoor activities without adequate physical distancing, and three times for refusing access to a health inspector.
