= B. T. Collins =

American politician (1940–1993)

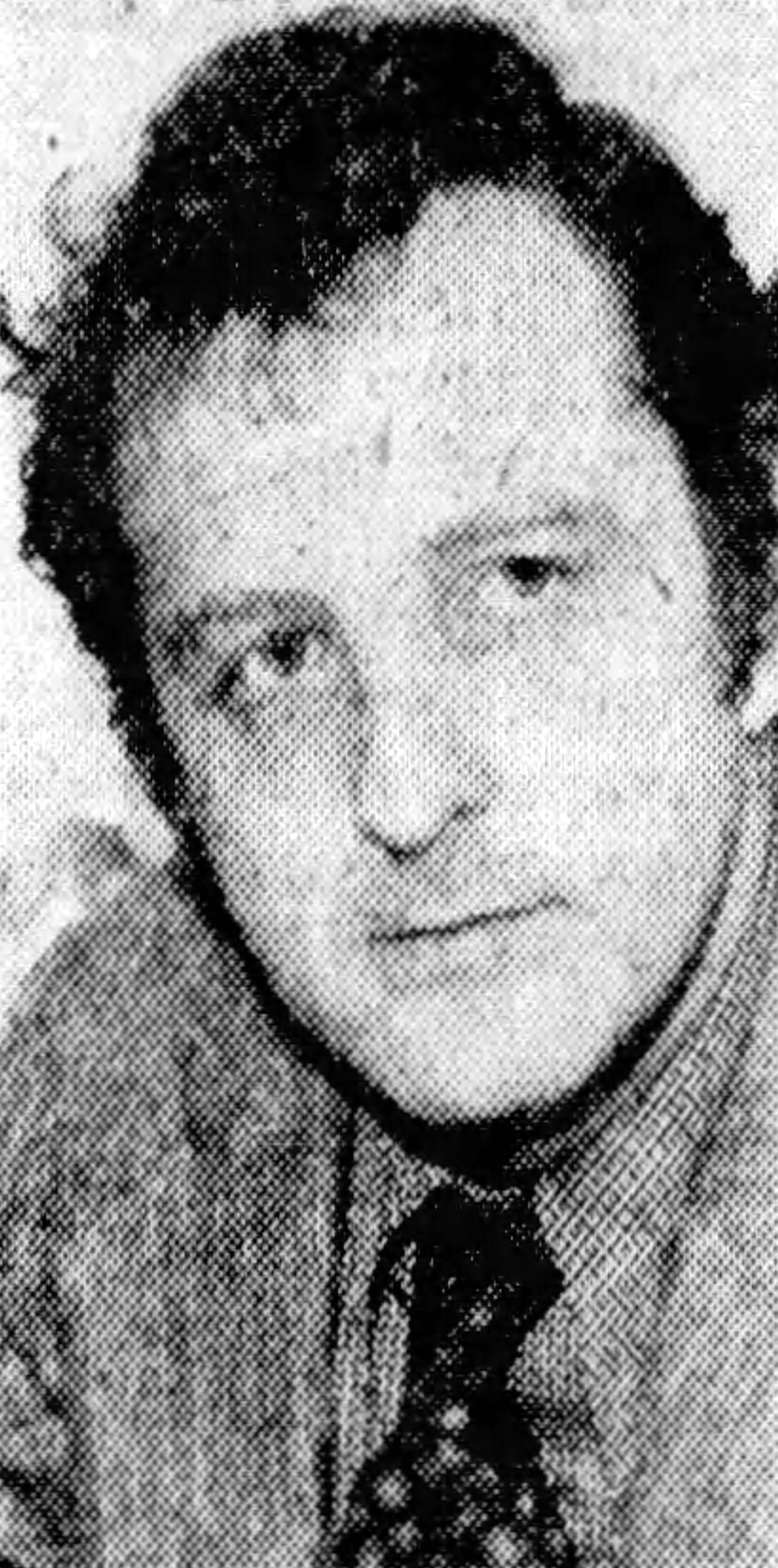
- Collins c. 1976

Member of the California State Assembly from the 5th district
- In office September 18, 1991 – March 19, 1993
- Preceded by: Tim Leslie
- Succeeded by: Barbara Alby

Chief of Staff to the Governor of California
- In office October 7, 1981 – January 3, 1983
- Governor: Jerry Brown
- Preceded by: Gray Davis
- Succeeded by: Steven Merksamer

Director of the California Conservation Corps
- In office January 13, 1979 – October 7, 1981
- Appointed by: Jerry Brown
- Preceded by: LeRoy Chatfield
- Succeeded by: John Dugan

Personal details
- Born: October 17, 1940 Mt. Vernon, New York, U.S.
- Died: March 19, 1993 (aged 52) Sacramento, California, U.S.
- Party: Republican
- Education: Santa Clara University

Military service
- Allegiance: United States
- Branch/service: United States Army
- Rank: Captain
- Battles/wars: Vietnam War

Brien Thomas "B. T." Collins (October 17, 1940 – March 19, 1993) was an American politician from California and a member of the Republican party.

== Early years ==
Born in New York City, Collins served as a Green Beret Captain during the Vietnam War and lost his right arm and right leg to a grenade attack in 1967. Upon returning to the United States, Collins enrolled at Santa Clara University, earning a B.A. in 1970 and a J.D. in 1973.

== Executive branch ==
In 1979, Collins was appointed by Democratic Governor Jerry Brown as Director of the California Conservation Corps. During his California Conservation Corps service, Collins gained notoriety for drinking a beaker of malathion to demonstrate his belief that it was safe.

Although a Democrat, Brown nevertheless appointed the conservative Republican Collins to replace Gray Davis as his chief of staff, a position Collins held from 1981 until Brown left office in 1983.

Collins served as chief deputy to Republican California State Treasurer Tom Hayes from 1989 until 1991, when Hayes left office and Republican Governor Pete Wilson appointed Collins as director of the California Youth Authority.

== State Assembly ==
After Sacramento-area Republican Tim Leslie won a 1991 special election to the California State Senate to replace John Doolittle, who had been elected to Congress, Wilson encouraged Collins to run for Leslie's vacant seat in the State Assembly. Collins won a special election that September for the Sacramento-area 5th District against fellow Republican Barbara Alby, and narrowly beat her again in the 1992 GOP primary.

== Death ==
Collins died of a sudden heart attack March 19, 1993 in Sacramento while serving his second term in the State Assembly. Alby won the special election to replace him.

Several sites in Sacramento have been named in his honor, including the BT Collins Juvenile Justice Center in Sacramento. When the Sacramento Army Depot was redesignated as an Army Reserve Center in the mid-1990s, it was renamed the B.T. Collins Army Reserve Center.

There is also a park in the City of Folsom named the B.T. Collins City Park located at 828 Willow Creek Drive, Folsom, California. The men's restroom in the Santa Clara University School of Law library was named the "B.T. Collins Memorial Latrine" in his honor; it features a plaque over the urinal with a quote from Collins: "If it ain't in Gilbert's, it ain't the Law."

== Electoral history ==
Member, California State Assembly: 1991-1993
Year	Office	Democrat	Votes	Pct	Republican	Votes	Pct			
1991	California State Assembly; District 5 (Special Election)	none			B.T. Collins 50.2% Barbara Alby 49.8%	19,785	62.1%	David McCann	12,091	37.9%
1992	California State Assembly; District 5	Joan Barry 65% Jack Robbins 35%	65,787	41.2%	B.T. Collins 52% Barbara Alby 48%	93,833	58.8%			

California Assembly
Preceded by Tim Leslie	California State Assembly, 5th District; September 18, 1991–March 19, 1993	Succeeded by Barbara Alby
