= Sean Wallentine =

American politician (born 1970)

Member of the California State Board of Equalization from the 2nd District
- In office December 31, 2010 – January 3, 2011
- Preceded by: Barbara Alby
- Succeeded by: George Runner

Personal details
- Born: September 26, 1970 (age 56) Lynwood, California
- Party: Republican
- Spouse: Doria (Morrison) Wallentine
- Children: Caleb, Joshua, Ezra
- Education: UCLA

Military service
- Branch/service: U.S. Marine Corps
- Years of service: 1988–1994
- Rank: Sergeant
- Battles/wars: Gulf War

Sean Wallentine (born September 26, 1970) is a Republican former acting Member of the California State Board of Equalization, representing the 2nd District, holding office for three days from Friday, December 31, 2010 to Monday, January 3, 2011. Consequently, he is the record-holder for the shortest tenure of a California constitutional officer, surpassing Governor Milton Latham, who held the record (with five days' tenure) for 150 years.

== Early life ==
Born in Lynwood, California, Wallentine served as a member of the United States Marine Corps Reserve from 1988 to 1994. During his time with the Marine Corps, he was on active duty during Operation Desert Shield and Operation Desert Storm. In 1994, Wallentine completed his service in the Marine Corps and also graduated from UCLA, earning his Bachelor of Arts in history.

== Career ==
=== State Assembly and campaigns ===
Upon graduating from UCLA, Wallentine joined the victorious campaign of California State Assembly candidate Jim Morrissey and became a member of Morrissey's staff as his Legislative Director in the California State Capitol. He joined the Dole-Kemp campaign for President in 1996. In 1997, Wallentine became chief of staff to Assemblyman Roy Ashburn. During his tenure there, he also served as a consultant for Chris Mitchum for Assembly in 1998 and as an associate with Steve Presson Associates in 2000.

=== State Senate ===
Eight and a half years later, Wallentine became chief of staff to State Senator Bob Dutton, where he served for 15 months before taking the same position for State Senator George Runner three months before Runner was elected to the Board of Equalization. Wallentine worked with Morrissey, Ashburn, Dutton, and Runner on enabling greater job creation in the private sector, reforming welfare, increasing criminal penalties (with particular emphasis on child predators), and increasing government accountability by cutting regulations and reducing bureaucracy.

=== Board of Equalization ===
After the resignation of Barbara Alby on December 31, 2010, Wallentine was sworn in as acting Member of the Board of Equalization to serve until Runner took office on January 3, 2011, at which point he became Runner's Chief Deputy at the Board. Consequently, Wallentine became the record-holder for the shortest tenure of a California constitutional officer, surpassing Governor Milton Latham, who held the record for 150 years.

During his tenure in office, Wallentine released an assessment practices survey report for Nevada County and announced emergency rainstorm tax relief in Mariposa County.

== Family ==
Wallentine is married to the former Doria Morrison, who previously worked for State Senate Republican Leader Jim Brulte, State Senator Tim Leslie, and Assemblyman Tom Bordonaro. Sean and Doria Wallentine live in Sacramento with their three sons: Caleb, Joshua and Ezra.

Political offices
Preceded by Barbara Alby	Member, California State Board of Equalization; 2nd District; December 31, 2010 – January 3, 2011	Succeeded by George Runner
