= George Nakano =

American politician

Member of the California State Assembly from the 53rd district
- In office December 7, 1998 - November 30, 2004
- Preceded by: Debra Bowen
- Succeeded by: Mike Gordon

Personal details
- Born: November 24, 1935 (age 90) Los Angeles, California
- Party: Democratic
- Spouse: Helen
- Children: 2

Military service
- Branch/service: Air National Guard

George Nakano (born November 24, 1935) served as a California State Assemblyman for the 53rd district from 1998 until 2004. During his time in the Assembly, Nakano was chosen to serve as the chairman of the Democratic caucus. In 2006, Nakano sought the State Senate seat of his Assembly predecessor, Debra Bowen, who was running for the secretary of state. Nakano lost to fellow Assembly colleague Jenny Oropeza by a margin of 53% to 47%.

Prior to his service in the Assembly, Nakano served as a Torrance, California city councilmember for 14 years. In 1994, Nakano lost a senate primary to State Senate veteran Ralph C. Dills.

Nakano was born in a poor East Los Angeles neighborhood. He spent time in the Jerome and Tule Lake internment camps during World War II, following the signing of Executive Order 9066. He served in the California Air National Guard for six years before being honorably discharged as a staff sergeant in 1960. Nakano achieved the rank of 5th dan in kendo.

Nakano attended El Camino College before going to California State University, Los Angeles for his Bachelor of Science degree. He also received a master's degree in education from California State University, Los Angeles.

California Assembly
Preceded by Debra Bowen	California State Assembly, 53rd District; 1998 – 2004	Succeeded by Mike Gordon
