= Elmer S. Rigdon =

American politician

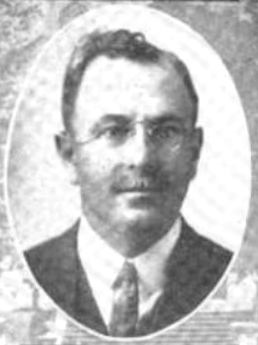

Member of the California Senate from the 17th district
- In office January 8, 1917 - December 13, 1922
- Preceded by: Archibald E. Campbell
- Succeeded by: Ralph Hughes

Member of the California State Assembly from the 53rd district
- In office January 4, 1915 - January 8, 1917
- Preceded by: Abram B. Green
- Succeeded by: Carlton W. Greene

Personal details
- Born: Elmer Scott Rigdon; June 16, 1868 Cambria, California
- Died: December 13, 1922 (aged 54) San Francisco, California
- Party: Democratic
- Spouse: Alica
- Children: 1
- Occupation: California State Senate member

Elmer Scott Rigdon (June 16, 1868 – December 13, 1922) was an American politician. He was a member of the California State Senate from Cambria, California. He was the key proponent for building the Carmel-San Simeon Highway along the Big Sur coast. He was a member of the California Senate Committee on Roads and Highways and during World War I promoted the military necessity of defending California's coast. He persuaded the legislature to approve the project. In 1919, the legislature approved submission of a bond measure to voters.

== Life and career ==
He was the son of Rufus Rigdon and Indiana Scott Rigdon. His parents homesteaded 145 acres (59 ha) in Cambria during the 1860s. Elmer Rigdon became a rancher and timber harvester. He also owned a brickyard in Cambria and the Bank Mine on San Simeon Creek. He extracted quicksilver from the mine from 1903 to 1906, when he sold his interest. He was elected to the California State Assembly in 1914 and to the State Senate in 1916.

Dr. John L. D. Roberts, who founded Seaside, California, had a strong interest in building a road along the California central coast. In 1897, he walked the entire stretch of rocky coast from Monterey to San Luis Obispo in five days and mapped out the course of the future road. He photographed the land and became the first surveyor of the route. In 1915, he presented the results of his survey and photographic work to a joint session of the California legislature. Roberts initially promoted the coastal highway to allow access to a region of spectacular beauty, but failed to obtain funding. Rigdon embraced the necessity of building the road. As a member of the California Senate Committee on Roads and Highways during World War I, he promoted the military necessity of defending California's coast and persuaded the legislature to support the project. The $1.5 million bond issue was approved by voters, but construction was delayed by World War I. Federal funds were appropriated and in 1921 voters approved additional state funds.

== Death and legacy ==
Rigdon died in office in San Francisco on December 13, 1922, before the highway was completed. At the dedication of the highway on June 27, 1937, his wife dedicated a silver fir to her husband's memory. A small park and drinking fountain in a turnout between Vicente Creek Bridge and Big Creek Bridge, 4 miles (6.4 km) north of Lucia. was dedicated as the Elmer Rigdon Memorial Drinking Fountain.
