= Desert Christian Schools (California) =

Location
- 44662 15th Street West (main); 44514 20th St West (high school); Lancaster, California 93534; United States

Information
- Motto: 1 Peter 3:15-18
- Denomination: Non-Denominational
- Established: 1977
- Director: Joshua DeVore
- Grades: Preschool–12th
- Gender: Coeducational
- Average class size: 30
- Colors: Blue, Black, and White
- Slogan: Providing a God-Centered Christian Education; Ready with the Truth (in promotions); Discover the Difference (in promotions)
- Athletics: yes (high school and middle school only)
- Athletics conference: Heritage League
- Mascot: Knights
- Team name: Knights
- Publication: AlumKnights (formerly)
- Newspaper: DCS Knightly News
- Website: www.desertchristian.com

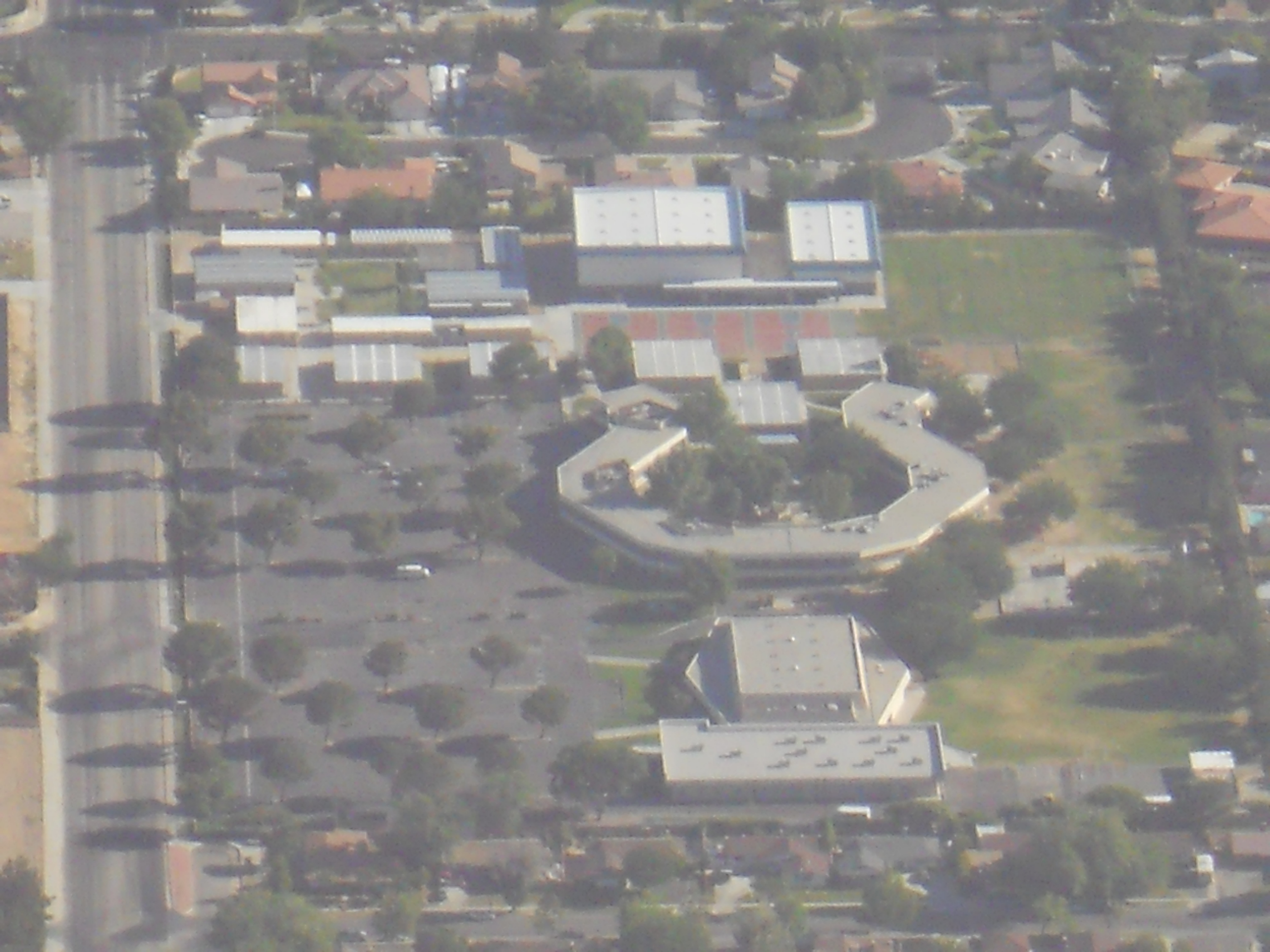
Aerial photo of the main campus. The Runner Activity Center opened in c.2009.

Desert Christian Schools, or DCS, or simply just Desert Christian, is a private Christian school in Lancaster, California. Since September 5, 2025, DCS shares both their properties with Grace Chapel for the main campus, and City Church for the high school campus. DCS uses RenWeb (now FACTS) as their school management system.

== History ==
A group of leaders of the First Baptist Church in Lancaster, California led by George and Sharon Runner broke ground on a new school in 1976. The Family Learning Center opened its doors in 1977. Its first year included preschool classrooms, one kindergarten class, and after school care. The Learning Village Grade School opened in 1979 with the addition of first and second grades. By 1984, the school had expanded to include preschool, elementary and middle school, and by 1988, the infrastructure was complete with the addition of high school classes and an enrollment of 1300 students. It was at this time the name was changed to Desert Christian Schools, a name that more succinctly described the role of the schools as a Christian education institution in the Antelope Valley.

The school has been accredited by the Association of Christian Schools International and the Western Association of Schools and Colleges and has been awarded the AV's Best Private School distinction over 20 times. It currently is the 2020 AV's Best Private School, an award voted upon by readers of the valley newspaper.

== Campus ==
Desert Christian Elementary School and Middle school are located on a 15-acre (61,000 m^{2}) site on 15th Street West. Desert Christian High School is located at 44514 20th St West, about 1.2 miles (1.9 km) from the main campus.

== Elementary school ==
Desert Christian Elementary School, or DCES, is Desert Christian's elementary school which is located on the main campus. The principal of DCES is Shannon Case.

== Middle school ==
Desert Christian Middle School, or DCMS, is Desert Christian's middle school which is located on the main campus. The principal of DCMS is Lisa Costello.

== High school ==
Desert Christian High School, or DCHS, is Desert Christian's high school. DCHS began in 1988 at the main campus, before moving 2 times and ending up at 2340 W Avenue J8 from c.1999 to June 2025. On March 3, 2025, it was announced that DCHS would be moving to 44514 20th St West (City Church) as part of an ongoing expansion which includes adding a coffee shop and a football stadium. Construction began around Late Spring/Early Summer of 2025, and phase 1 of the project opened on September 5, 2025. On December 13, 2025, the high school's coffee shop, named Amate Coffee, officially opened. The principal of DCHS is Caleb Smith.

=== AP/Dual Credit Courses ===
DCHS offers Advanced Placement classes as well as Dual Credit Classes affording students the opportunity to earn college credits while still in high school. This program is led by Regina Bloemendaal.

=== Athletics ===
Since 2023, the Desert Christian Knights Athletics program contains 11 (12 when volleyball is separated into 2 or 10 if cheer is not counted) sports teams, and participates in the Heritage League. The director of the program is Marc Rondeau.

==== Fall Sports ====
- Football (est. 2004; Varsity only)
- Girls Volleyball (est. 1995; Varsity/JV/Frosh [lower classmen team])
- Cross Country (est. 1988)

==== Winter Sports ====
- Soccer (est; 1988; Varsity only)
- Basketball (Varsity only)

==== Spring Sports ====
- Baseball (JV/Varsity)
- Softball (Varsity only)
- Track (est. 2002)
- Swim (est. 2023)
- Boys Volleyball (Varsity only)

Cheer runs from fall to winter, with competition happening around February.

== After School Care (ES and MS only) ==
Peach Factory is the name of Desert Christian's before and after-school care for children kindergarten through eighth grade.
