= Sharon Runner =

American politician (1954–2016)

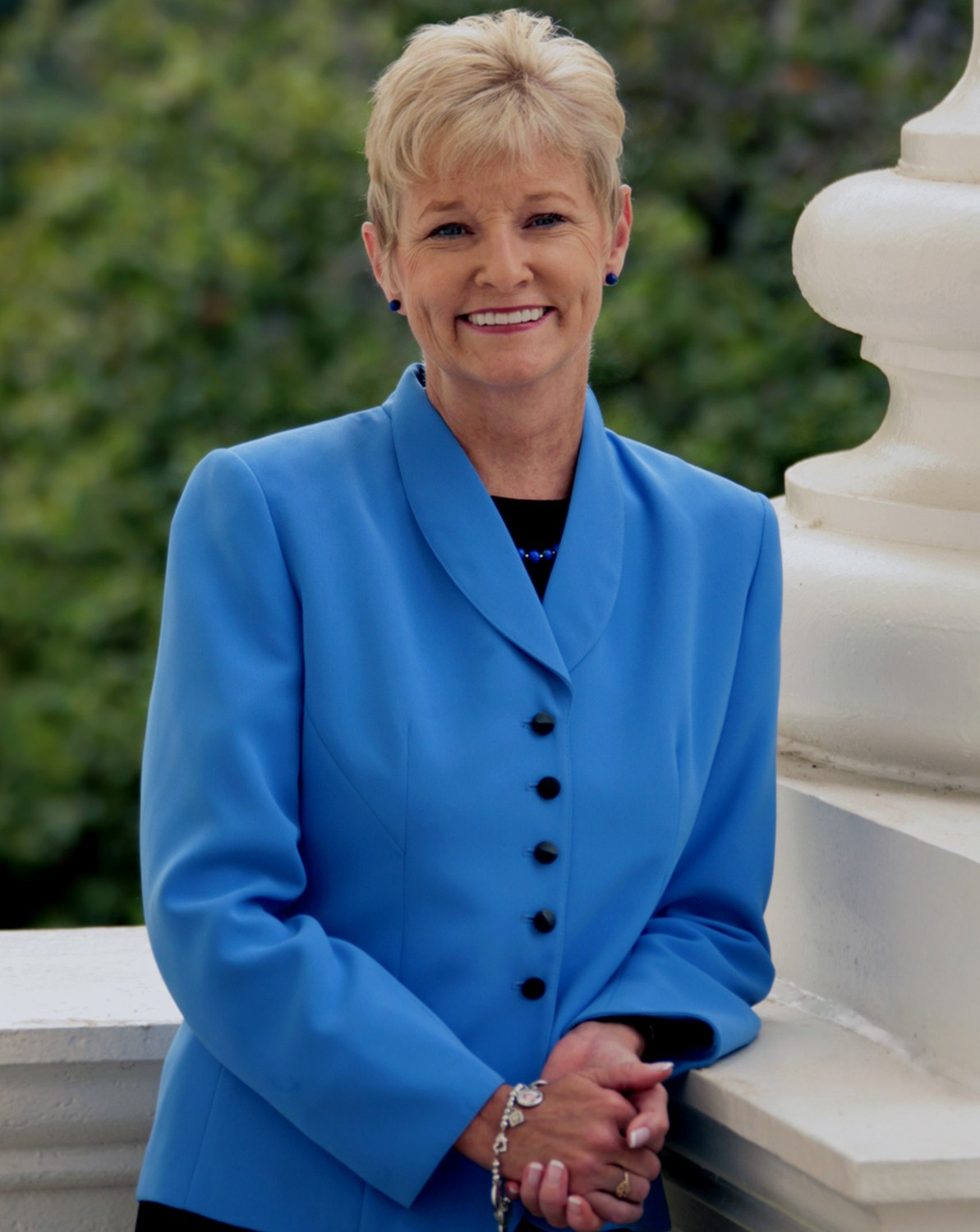
- Official portrait, 2007

Member of the California State Senate
- In office March 19, 2015 – July 14, 2016
- Preceded by: Steve Knight
- Succeeded by: Scott Wilk
- Constituency: 21st district
- In office February 18, 2011 – December 3, 2012
- Preceded by: George Runner
- Succeeded by: Bill Monning (redistricted)
- Constituency: 17th district

Member of the California State Assembly from the 36th district
- In office December 2, 2002 – December 1, 2008
- Preceded by: George Runner
- Succeeded by: Steve Knight

Personal details
- Born: Sharon Yvonne Oden; May 17, 1954 Los Angeles, California
- Died: July 14, 2016 (aged 62) Lancaster, California
- Party: Republican
- Spouse: George Runner (m. 1973–2016) (her death)
- Education: Antelope Valley College
- Profession: Businesswoman

Sharon Yvonne Runner (née Oden; May 17, 1954 – July 14, 2016) was an American politician. She was a Republican California State Senator, who represented the 21st Senate District at the time of her death, and previously represented the 17th Senate District from 2011 to 2012. She was also a member of the California State Assembly from 2002 to 2008, representing the 36th district. She was the wife of California State Board of Equalization Member George Runner. From 2004 to 2008, then-Senator George Runner and then-Assemblywoman Sharon Runner were the first husband and wife in California history to serve concurrently in the California State Legislature.

== Early life ==
Born Sharon Yvonne Oden in Los Angeles, California and raised in the Antelope Valley, Runner graduated from Antelope Valley High School and attended Antelope Valley College.

== Political career ==
Runner was an officer for the Antelope Valley Republican Assembly and remained active in many Republican groups in the Antelope Valley, including the Palmdale and High Desert Republican Women's Clubs, until her death. She served on the board of California Women Lead, a bi-partisan organization that encourages and empowers women running for public office. She served as President of the board of California's Women's Leadership Association for 2011–12.

During the 2004 Presidential election, Runner served as the California Women's Coalition Chair for the Bush/Cheney Campaign. She was chosen as a delegate to the 2000 and 2004 Republican National Conventions. She worked on several statewide campaigns including Governor Pete Wilson, California Gubernatorial Recall Election, Governor Arnold Schwarzenegger, and Meg Whitman for Governor 2010.

In 2009, Runner was appointed by Governor Arnold Schwarzenegger to the California Unemployment Insurance Appeals Board. She served on the board until December 22, 2010. In 2013 Runner began working part-time for the California State Senate Republican Caucus conducting community outreach events. She also ran "The Runner Group," a public relations/marketing company she founded in 1994.

=== Assembly career ===
In 2002, Runner was elected to represent the 36th Assembly District and served in the State Assembly for three terms, from 2002 to 2008.

While in the Assembly she served on the Veteran's Committee; Housing Committee; Select Committees dealing with Foster Care; the Committee on Drug and Alcohol Abuse; as well as the Task Force on the Environment, Energy, and the Economy. She also held key fiscal leadership positions, serving as the Vice-Chair of the Appropriations Committee and as a member of the Budget Committee and Budget Subcommittee on Education.

During her first term in office, Runner was appointed as Assistant Republican Leader by former Assembly Republican Leader Kevin McCarthy.

==== Jessica's Law ====
In 2006, along with her husband, Senator George Runner, Sharon Runner authored Proposition 83, California's version of Jessica's Law. The measure passed with the support of 71% of California voters, and passed in 57 of California's 58 counties.

Jessica's Law ensures that all sexual offenders who are convicted of activity with children under the age of 14 are put into prison with a mandatory minimum sentence of 15 years or 25 years to life. It eliminates all "first-offense" sexual offense provisions from California law.

It also eliminates all "good-time" credits for sexual offenders serving prison terms; under the authored provisions they are required to serve their entire sentence and will not be released for good behavior. The law requires that sex offenders who are released from prison wear a GPS bracelet for life.

It also creates a 2,000-foot (615-meter) zone around schools and parks in which registered sex offenders are prohibited from residing.

=== Senate career ===
Runner ran for election to the California State Senate, representing the 17th District. The seat was left vacant by her husband, George Runner, who was elected to the State Board of Equalization in November 2010. The primary election took place on February 15, 2011, she defeated Democrat Darren Parker 66%–34% to avoid a runoff.

To focus on her recovery from a double lung transplant necessitated by her limited scleroderma, she chose to not seek re-election in 2012 and was succeeded by Steve Knight in the renumbered 21st Senate District.

A special election for the 21st Senate District, vacated by Steve Knight who was elected to Congress in November 2014, was held on March 17, 2015. After a successful recruitment effort, Runner decided to enter the race. She was the only candidate on the ballot, and easily won reelection to the Senate with 100% of the vote. Runner was sworn into the State Senate on March 19, 2015, where she would serve until her death the following year.

== Community involvement ==
In 1977, Runner co-founded Desert Christian Schools with her husband, George Runner. It has since grown to become one of the largest private schools in California with nearly 1,700 students on three separate campuses. She served on the Board until her death. Prior to Desert Christian Schools, Runner worked as a licensed realtor with Red Carpet Real Estate Company where she was named "Realtor of the Year."

She volunteered her time on several boards and committees including the United Way, Antelope Valley Hospital Gift Foundation, Antelope Valley Crime Task Force, Healthy Homes Advisory Council, and Care Net, a pregnancy resource center. She also spent five years on the board of directors for the Lancaster Chamber of Commerce. In 1998, California Governor Pete Wilson appointed Runner to serve on the Antelope Valley Fair board of directors, where she oversaw the operations of the 50th Agriculture District and managed its multimillion-dollar budget. She held this position until 2002.

She was involved with her church, Grace Chapel Church in Lancaster, for over 30 years.

== Awards and recognitions ==
In 2013, Runner was awarded the Marian Bergeson Lifetime Achievement Award for her work helping women run for office.

In November 2014 Runner received the Spirit of Leadership Award by the Scleroderma Foundation of Southern California for her advocacy in increasing funding to find a cure for Scleroderma.

== Personal life ==
She married George Runner in 1973. They had a son, Micah, daughter-in-law, Sandy, daughter, Rebekah (who serves in the U.S. Coast Guard), son-in-law, James, and four grandchildren. Through her marriage, Runner was an aunt to Major League Baseball player Casey Fien.

== Health and death ==
Runner was diagnosed with the limited systemic form of scleroderma, an autoimmune disease affecting her lungs, in 1984 at the age of 30. On February 24, 2012, Runner underwent a successful double-lung transplant at the Ronald Reagan UCLA Medical Center. She was released from the hospital ten days later. To focus on her recovery, Runner decided not to seek re-election in the 2012 race for the California Senate.

Runner was a member of the Scleroderma Foundation's Legislative Committee, where she worked to obtain federal funding for scleroderma research. She also sat on the Advisory Committee for Sierra Donor Services, a donor procurement organization in Sacramento, California.

Runner worked and connected regularly with lung transplant patients. In 2014, she was selected as a rider on the 11th annual Donate Life Rose Parade Float along with 29 other donor recipients.

Runner died at her home on July 14, 2016, due to "respiratory complications."

Political offices
Preceded by George Runner	California State Assemblymember; 36th District; December 2, 2002 – November 30, 2008	Succeeded by Steve Knight
Preceded by George Runner	California State Senator; 17th District; February 18, 2011 – December 3, 2012	Succeeded by Bill Monning
Preceded by Steve Knight	California State Senator; 21st District; March 19, 2015 – July 14, 2016	Succeeded by Scott Wilk
