= Mike Gordon (politician) =

American politician

Member of the California State Assembly from the 53rd district
- In office December 6, 2004 - June 25, 2005
- Preceded by: George Nakano
- Succeeded by: Ted Lieu

Personal details
- Born: November 15, 1957 Lynwood, California
- Died: June 25, 2005 (aged 47) El Segundo, California
- Party: Democratic
- Spouse: Denise
- Children: 4

Mike Gordon (November 15, 1957 – June 25, 2005) was an American politician who served as a member of the California State Assembly. After his swearing in in December 2004, he was diagnosed with a brain tumor in March and died in June 2005. Prior to his time in the Assembly, he served as the mayor of El Segundo, CA from 1996 until 2004. He also served as the executive director of the California Democratic Party from 1983 until 1985. He was a principal in the El Segundo-based political fund-raising firm Gordon & Schwenkmeyer, which has many prominent Democrats among its clients.

In 2004, Gordon left the office of mayor of El Segundo to run for State Assembly. He won by a close margin over Redondo Beach mayor Greg Hill.

Political offices
Preceded by George Nakano	Assemblymember, 53rd Assembly District; December 6, 2004 - June 25, 2005	Succeeded by Ted Lieu
