= Freddie Rodriguez =

American politician

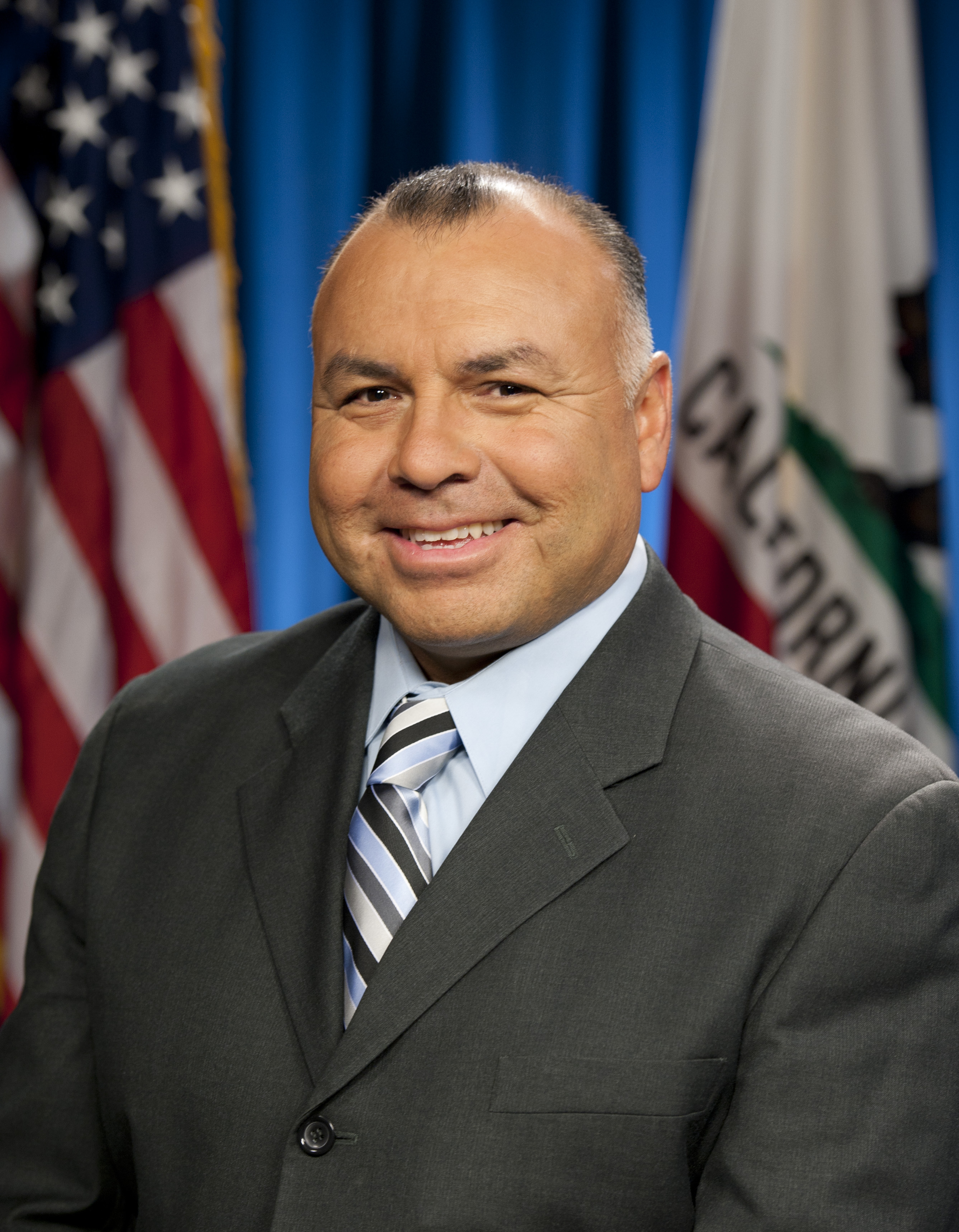

Member of the California State Assembly
- In office October 11, 2013 – November 30, 2024
- Preceded by: Norma Torres
- Succeeded by: Michelle Rodriguez
- Constituency: 52nd district (2013–2022); 53rd district (2022–2024)

Personal details
- Born: September 8, 1965 (age 60) Pomona, California, U.S.
- Party: Democratic
- Spouse: Michelle Rodriguez
- Children: 4

Freddie Rodriguez (born September 8, 1965) is an American politician and emergency medical technician who served in the California State Assembly for the 53rd district, which encompasses part of the Pomona Valley. A Democrat, he was previously a member of the Pomona City Council.

== Political career ==
Rodriguez worked as a full-time emergency medical technician for thirty years prior to being elected to the assembly, holding an EMT certificate from Mt. San Antonio College, and continues to work for American Medical Response on a part-time basis.

=== California State Assembly ===
Rodriguez was first elected to the assembly in a 2013 special election to replace then-Assemblymember Norma Torres, who was elected to the California State Senate in a special election. He narrowly defeated independent Ontario Mayor Paul Leon.

Rodriguez is term-limited and could not run for re-election in 2024. His wife, Michelle, advanced to the general election alongside a Republican.

=== 2024 Pomona mayoral campaign ===
In 2024, Rodriguez ran in the Pomona mayoral election. He lost to incumbent Mayor Tim Sandoval, placing second with 27.98% of the vote.

== Electoral history ==
=== 2013 (special) ===
California's 52nd State Assembly district special election, 2013
Primary election
| Party | Candidate | Votes | % |
|---|---|---|---|
| No party preference | Paul S. Leon | 4,219 | 24.9 |
| Democratic | Freddie Rodriguez | 3,758 | 22.2 |
| Republican | Dorothy F. Pineda | 2,453 | 14.5 |
| Democratic | Jason A. Rothman | 1,545 | 9.1 |
| Democratic | Tom Haughey | 1,482 | 8.7 |
| Democratic | Danielle Soto | 1,259 | 7.4 |
| Democratic | Doris Louise Wallace | 887 | 5.2 |
| Democratic | Paul Vincent Avila | 752 | 4.4 |
| Democratic | Manuel Saucedo | 597 | 3.5 |
| Total votes | | 16,952 | 100.0 |
General election
| Democratic | Freddie Rodriguez | 7,630 | 51.3 |
| No party preference | Paul S. Leon | 7,230 | 48.7 |
| Total votes | | 14,860 | 100.0 |
| Democratic hold | | | |

=== 2014 ===
California's 52nd State Assembly district election, 2014
Primary election
| Party | Candidate | Votes | % |
|---|---|---|---|
| Democratic | Freddie Rodriguez (incumbent) | 11,543 | 55.2 |
| Republican | Dorothy F. Pineda | 9,368 | 44.8 |
| Total votes | | 20,911 | 100.0 |
General election
| Democratic | Freddie Rodriguez (incumbent) | 27,877 | 58.9 |
| Republican | Dorothy F. Pineda | 19,470 | 41.1 |
| Total votes | | 47,347 | 100.0 |
| Democratic hold | | | |

=== 2016 ===
California's 52nd State Assembly district election, 2016
Primary election
| Party | Candidate | Votes | % |
|---|---|---|---|
| Democratic | Freddie Rodriguez (incumbent) | 33,830 | 63.9 |
| Democratic | Paul Vincent Avila | 18,943 | 35.8 |
| Republican | Toni Holle (write-in) | 196 | 0.4 |
| Total votes | | 52,969 | 100.0 |
General election
| Democratic | Freddie Rodriguez (incumbent) | 64,836 | 59.1 |
| Democratic | Paul Vincent Avila | 44,865 | 40.9 |
| Total votes | | 109,701 | 100.0 |
| Democratic hold | | | |

=== 2018 ===
California's 52nd State Assembly district election, 2018
Primary election
| Party | Candidate | Votes | % |
|---|---|---|---|
| Democratic | Freddie Rodriguez (incumbent) | 21,736 | 48.0 |
| Republican | Toni Holle | 16,087 | 35.5 |
| Democratic | Frank C. Guzman | 6,297 | 13.9 |
| Libertarian | Ben W. Gibbons | 1,205 | 2.7 |
| Total votes | | 45,325 | 100.0 |
General election
| Democratic | Freddie Rodriguez (incumbent) | 70,507 | 68.6 |
| Republican | Toni Holle | 32,273 | 31.4 |
| Total votes | | 102,780 | 100.0 |
| Democratic hold | | | |

=== 2020 ===
California's 52nd State Assembly district election, 2020
Primary election
| Party | Candidate | Votes | % |
|---|---|---|---|
| Democratic | Freddie Rodriguez (incumbent) | 47,539 | 68.9 |
| Republican | Toni Holle | 21,499 | 31.1 |
| Democratic | Jesus Gonzalez (write-in) | 18 | 0.0 |
| Total votes | | 69,056 | 100.0 |
General election
| Democratic | Freddie Rodriguez (incumbent) | 112,165 | 68.3 |
| Republican | Toni Holle | 52,022 | 31.7 |
| Total votes | | 164,187 | 100.0 |
| Democratic hold | | | |

=== 2022 ===
California's 53rd State Assembly district election, 2022
Primary election
| Party | Candidate | Votes | % |
|---|---|---|---|
| Democratic | Freddie Rodriguez (incumbent) | 27,179 | 60.6 |
| Republican | Toni Holle | 17,646 | 39.4 |
| Total votes | | 44,825 | 100% |
General election
| Democratic | Freddie Rodriguez (incumbent) | 49,221 | 60.1 |
| Republican | Toni Holle | 32,684 | 39.9 |
| Total votes | | 81,905 | 100% |
| Democratic hold | | | |

=== 2024 ===
Pomona mayoral election, 2024
| Candidate | Votes | % |
|---|---|---|
| Tim Sandoval (incumbent) | 7,841 | 52.72 |
| Freddie Rodriguez | 4,162 | 27.98 |
| Veronica Cabrera | 1,713 | 11.52 |
| Gustavo Ramirez | 1,158 | 7.79 |
| Total votes | = | 100% |
