= Betsy Butler =

American politician

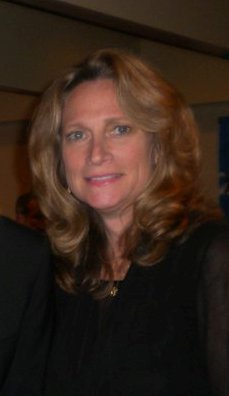
- Butler in 2011

Member of the California State Assembly from the 53rd district
- In office December 6, 2010 – November 30, 2012
- Preceded by: Ted Lieu
- Succeeded by: John Pérez

Personal details
- Born: June 14, 1963 (age 63) Sacramento, California, U.S.
- Party: Democratic
- Education: San Diego State University; University of California, Los Angeles
- Website: http://betsybutler.com

Betsy Butler (born June 14, 1963) is an American politician who served in the California State Assembly. She is a Democrat. Butler is the former Executive Director of the Women's Law Center. She serves as Chair of the California Commission on Aging, appointed in 2015 by the President pro tempore of the California State Senate, Kevin de León, and elected chair in 2018 and again in 2019. She also serves on the Los Angeles County Probation Commission, appointed by Los Angeles County Supervisor Hilda Solis in 2016. Prior to being elected to the State Assembly, Butler was a fundraiser for the California League of Conservation Voters and the Consumer Attorneys of California. She began her career in public service with Lt. Governor Leo T. McCarthy and was an appointee of President Bill Clinton in the International Trade Administration at the U.S. Department of Commerce in Washington, D.C. She has been a board member of Equality California, the Gay Men's Chorus of Los Angeles, and the Planned Parenthood Advocacy Project Los Angeles County.

== Early life ==
Butler was born in Sacramento, California and graduated from Del Campo High School. She is a graduate of San Diego State University and from the executive program at the University of California, Los Angeles.

== Political career ==
Butler was elected to the California State Assembly in 2010 to what was then the 53rd Assembly District.

Under the 2011 redistricting lines, the 53rd Assembly District changed significantly and Butler announced she would run for re-election in 2011 for the new open 50th Assembly District which includes Santa Monica, West Hollywood, Malibu and Beverly Hills. She narrowly lost reelection to Richard Bloom.

== Legislative measures ==
=== Banning Bisphenol A ===
Authored by Butler and signed into law by Governor Jerry Brown, AB 1319 – The Toxin-Free Infants and Toddlers Act — prohibited the manufacture, sale or distribution of baby bottles and sippy cups that contain Bisphenol A (BPA).

=== Issues relating to senior citizens ===
Butler also authored, and had signed into law, bills to protect the elderly against identity theft (AB 332) and to allow seniors and dependent adults to publicly speak out against their abusers (AB 2149).

=== Veteran issues ===
During her term in the Assembly, Butler was named the 2011 Legislator of the Year by the Vietnam Veterans of America and the 2012 Legislator of the Year by the American Veterans (AMVETS) AB 2371, AB 2490 and AB 1940.

=== Consumer protection ===
Governor Brown also signed Butler's legislation protecting consumers from fraudulent businesses (AB 2118) and green growth legislation designed to increase the use of electric and hybrid vehicles (AB 475).

=== Worker safety ===
In 2012 Butler introduced AB 2346, The Farm Worker Safety Act, to safeguard California farmworkers from abusive work conditions and ensure shade and water is readily available. The measure was vetoed by the governor.

=== Environmental ===
Butler introduced AB 972 to place a moratorium on hydraulic fracking.
