= Santa Clarita Christian School =

Location
- 27249 Luther Drive; Santa Clarita, California 91351; United States
- 34.4137°N 118.4653°W

Information
- Type: Christian school
- Established: 1982
- Grades: K-12
- Enrollment: 508 (2019-20)
- Campus: Suburban
- Colors: Red, White and Black
- Athletics conference: CIF Southern Section; Heritage League
- Team name: Cardinals
- Affiliation: Baptist
- Website: Santa Clarita Christian School

Santa Clarita Christian School (SCCS) is a private Christian school in Santa Clarita, California, United States. It serves students from kindergarten to 12th grade. It is a ministry of the Santa Clarita Baptist Church, and competes in the Heritage League athletic conference.

In 2022, the L.A. Times reported that the school had been cited seven times and sent a cease and desist by the Los Angeles County Department of Public Health for repeated COVID-19 related violations, including denying access to a health inspector.
