= Heritage League =

The Heritage League is a high school athletic league that is part of the CIF Southern Section. The league currently sponsors eight-man football.

== Member schools ==
- Desert Christian School (Lancaster)
- Faith Baptist School (Canoga Park)
- Lancaster Baptist School (Lancaster)
- The Palmdale Aerospace Academy (Palmdale)
- Palmdale Academy Charter School (Palmdale)
- Santa Clarita Christian School
- St. Monica Academy (Montrose)
- Trinity Classical Academy (Valencia)
- Valley Torah High School (Valley Village)
- Vasquez High School (Acton)
