= Trevor Brown (baseball) =

American baseball player

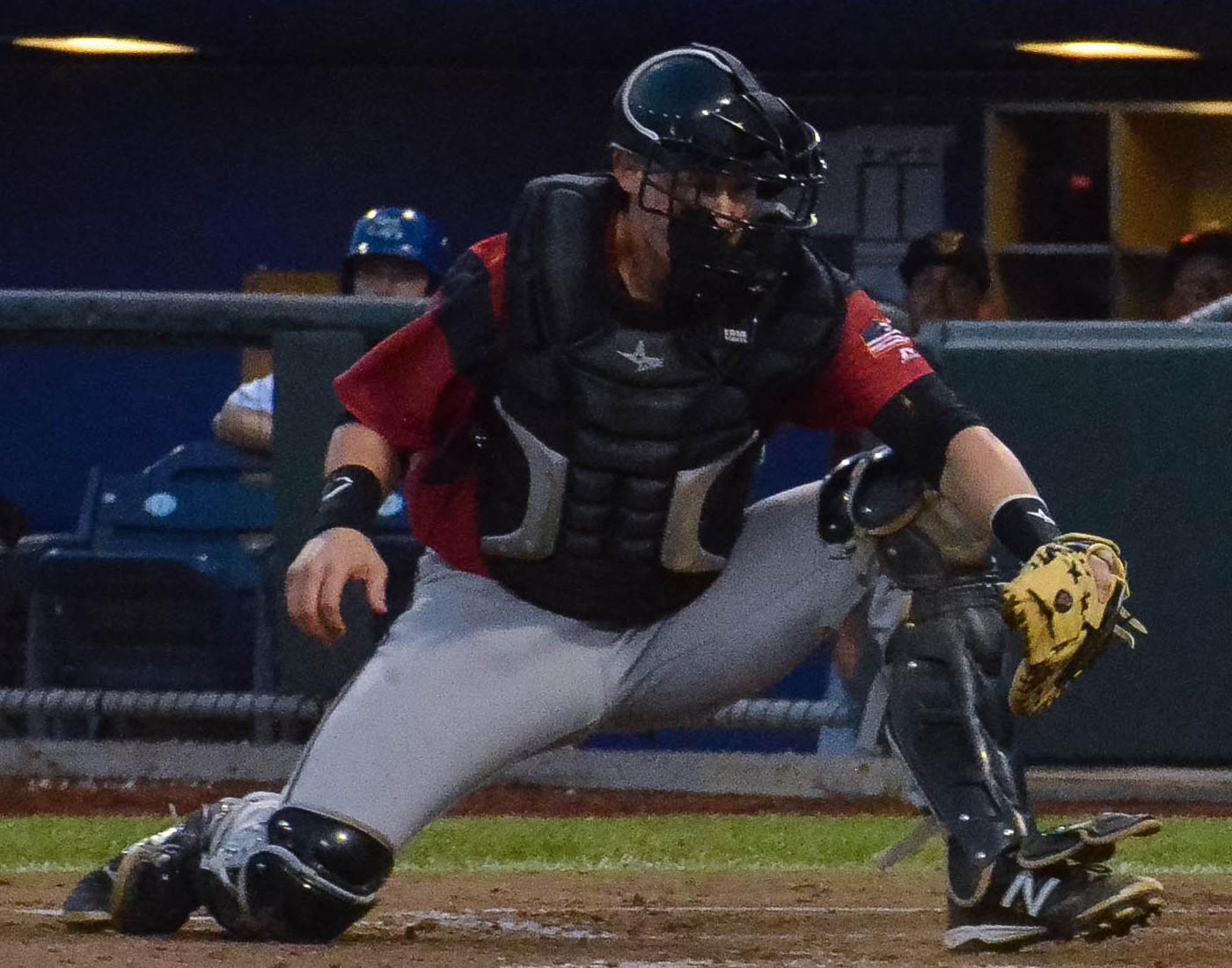
- Brown playing for the Sacramento River Cats in 2015
- Catcher
- Born: November 15, 1991 (age 34); Santa Clarita, California, U.S.
- Batted: Right Threw: Right

MLB debut
- September 19, 2015, for the San Francisco Giants

Last MLB appearance
- September 27, 2016, for the San Francisco Giants

MLB statistics (through 2016 season)
- Batting average: .237
- Home runs: 6
- Runs batted in: 24
- Stats at Baseball Reference

Teams
- San Francisco Giants (2015–2016)

Trevor Michael Brown (born November 15, 1991) is an American former professional baseball catcher. He played in Major League Baseball (MLB) for the San Francisco Giants.

== Early life ==
While in high school Brown worked for two years at In-N-Out. He graduated from Hart High School in Santa Clarita, California. Brown played college baseball for three years at the University of California, Los Angeles (UCLA), playing at catcher, first base, second base, third base, and right field.

== Career ==
Brown was drafted by the San Francisco Giants in the 10th round of the 2012 Major League Baseball draft. He primarily played second base at Augusta and San Jose in 2013. He switched to catcher in 2014 and split time between San Jose and AAA Fresno. He spent the 2015 season catching for AAA Sacramento before receiving his major league call-up.

Brown was called up to the majors for the first time on September 16, 2015, and made his major league debut on September 19. He got his first major league hit in his third start, an RBI double off Tyson Ross of the San Diego Padres, on September 22, 2015. Brown appeared in 13 games for the Giants, with 12 starts, batting .231 with 5 RBIs.

In 2016 Spring Training, Brown hit .324 (11-for-34) with nine RBIs in 17 games and was voted winner of the Barney Nugent Award, given to a player in his first big league camp whose performance best exemplifies the Giants spirit. Brown was named to the Giants' 2016 opening day roster as the backup catcher. On April 8, 2016, Brown hit his first major league home run, a game-tying two-run shot in the eighth inning off Chris Hatcher of the Los Angeles Dodgers that was the first Giants hit of the game. On April 12, 2016, Brown hit two home runs playing against the Colorado Rockies, becoming the first Giant to hit home runs for his first three hits in a season since Kevin Mitchell in 1991. He was outrighted to AAA on October 2, 2017.

On Saturday, June 9, 2018, Brown was released by the Giants after having played in only nine games in AAA for the Sacramento River Cats.

On Sunday, June 10, 2018, Brown re-signed with the Giants to a minor-league contract. He was released on September 28, 2018.

In January 2022, Brown became coach of the Trinity Classical Academy baseball team.

== Personal life ==
Brown is a Christian.
