= Michelle Rodriguez (politician) =

American politician

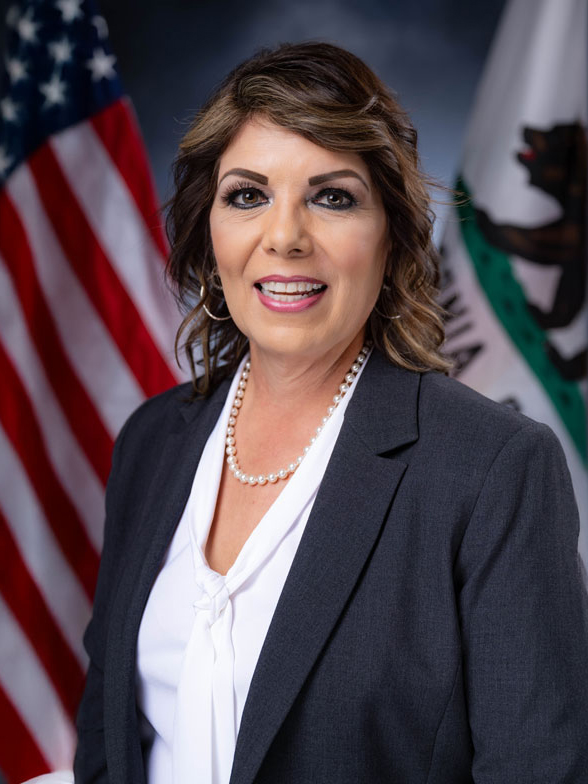
- Official portrait, 2024

Member of the California State Assembly from the 53rd district
- Incumbent
- Assumed office December 5, 2024
- Preceded by: Freddie Rodriguez

Personal details
- Born: February 25, 1969 (age 57) Ontario, California
- Party: Democratic
- Spouse: Freddie Rodriguez
- Children: 4
- Education: Northwest College

Michelle Rodriguez (born April 17, 1979) is an American politician in the California State Assembly representing the 53rd district. Elected in 2024 to succeed her husband, Freddie Rodriguez, she previously served on the California Commission on Peace Officer Standards and Training.

== Early life and education ==
Rodriguez was born and raised in Ontario, California. She graduated from Northwest College.

== Career ==
In 2024, Rodriguez ran for the California State Assembly to succeed her husband, Freddie Rodriguez, who was term-limited. Backed by strong business support, Michelle emerged as the frontrunner, defeating a Republican opponent in the general election. Her victory also blocked Robert Torres, son of Norma Torres, from claiming the Assembly seat that previously held by his mother. Her legislative priorities included advancing universal healthcare, addressing homelessness, and improving education.

== Personal life ==
Rodriguez lives in Pomona with her husband, former Assemblymember Freddie Rodriguez. The couple have four children.

== Electoral history ==
2024 California State Assembly 53rd district election
Primary election
| Party | Candidate | Votes | % |
|---|---|---|---|
| Republican | Nick Wilson | 23,050 | 43.0 |
| Democratic | Michelle Rodriguez | 10,835 | 20.2 |
| Democratic | Robert S. Torres | 8,894 | 16.6 |
| Democratic | Javier Hernandez | 8,422 | 15.7 |
| Democratic | Carlos Goytia | 2,358 | 4.4 |
| Total votes | | 53,559 | 100.0 |
General election
| Democratic | Michelle Rodriguez | 83,371 | 57.6 |
| Republican | Nick Wilson | 61,380 | 42.4 |
| Total votes | | 144,751 | 100.0 |
| Democratic hold | | | |
