= Casey Fien =

American baseball player (born 1983)

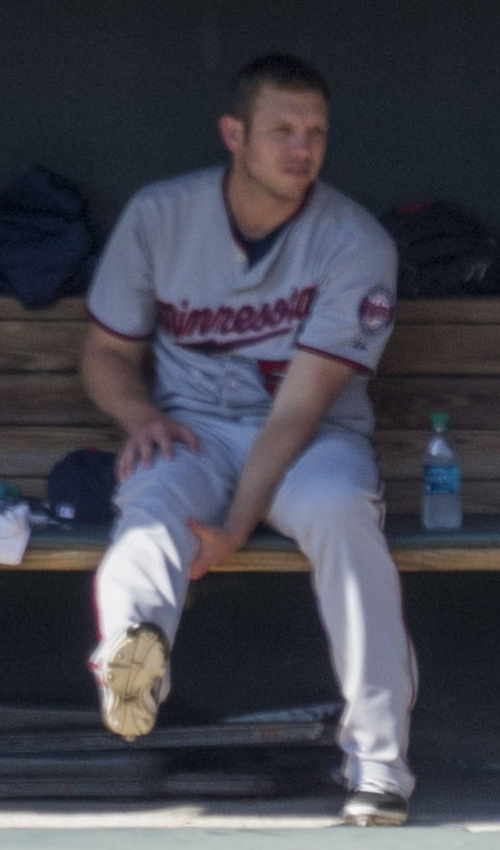
- Fien with the Minnesota Twins in 2015
- Pitcher
- Born: October 21, 1983 (age 42); Santa Rosa, California, U.S.
- Batted: Right Threw: Right

MLB debut
- July 26, 2009, for the Detroit Tigers

Last MLB appearance
- June 20, 2017, for the Philadelphia Phillies

MLB statistics
- Win–loss record: 17–18
- Earned run average: 4.42
- Strikeouts: 251
- Stats at Baseball Reference

Teams
- Detroit Tigers (2009–2010); Minnesota Twins (2012–2016); Los Angeles Dodgers (2016); Seattle Mariners (2017); Philadelphia Phillies (2017)

Casey Michael Fien (/fiːn/ feen; born October 21, 1983), is an American former professional baseball pitcher. He played in Major League Baseball (MLB) for the Detroit Tigers, Minnesota Twins, Los Angeles Dodgers, Seattle Mariners, and Philadelphia Phillies.

== Career ==
Fien attended John F. Kennedy High School in La Palma, California. For college, he attended William Penn University, Golden West College, and Cal Poly San Luis Obispo. At Cal Poly, he was roommates with fellow MLB pitcher Bud Norris.

=== Detroit Tigers ===
The Detroit Tigers selected Fien in the 20th round of the 2006 MLB draft. He was called up by the Tigers on July 24, 2009, from the Toledo Mud Hens to replace Eddie Bonine.

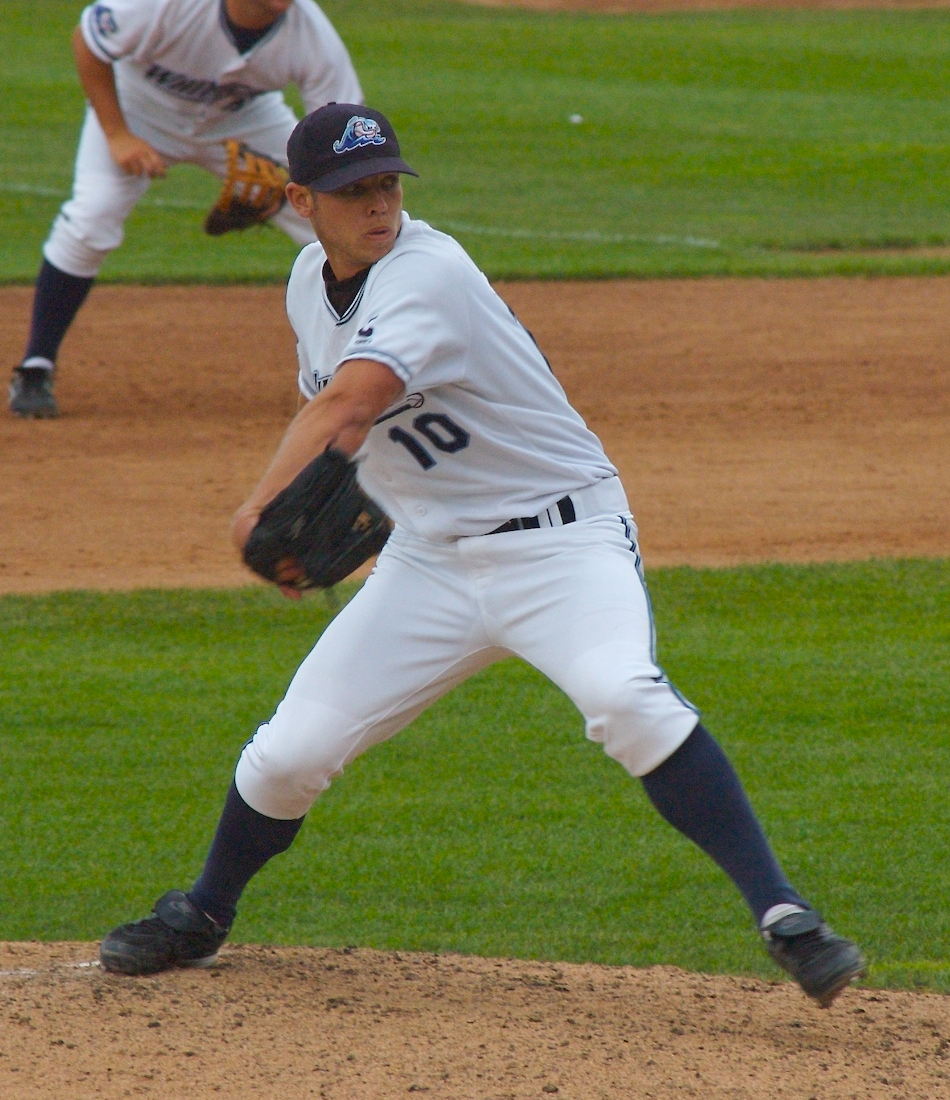
Fien pitching for the West Michigan Whitecaps in 2007.

On February 23, 2010, Fien was designated for assignment to make roster room for the newly acquired Johnny Damon. On March 1, 2010, he was selected off waivers by the Boston Red Sox, and then selected again by the Toronto Blue Jays on March 4. The Blue Jays released him on March 18 and he rejoined the Tigers on March 20.

On June 29, 2010, he was purchased from Triple-A to replace Joel Zumaya, who was placed on the 15-day disabled list. He was sent back down to Toledo on June 3. They called him back up on July 20. He was again sent back down to Toledo on July 21. He was designated for assignment on July 25, he cleared waivers and was sent outright to Triple-A Toledo Mud Hens on July 28. He elected free agency after the season on October 6.

=== Houston Astros ===
On November 5, 2010, Fien signed a minor league contract with the Houston Astros. He was released on August 2.

=== Minnesota Twins ===
On January 3, 2012, Fien signed a minor league contract with the Minnesota Twins.

On July 4, 2012, Fien was called up to the majors from the Triple A Rochester Red Wings, after the Twins optioned Nick Blackburn.

On July 8, 2012, Fien made his debut with the Twins, pitching a scoreless 8th inning against the Texas Rangers.

He finished 2012 making appearances in 35 games for the Twins, finishing the year with a 2–1 record and 4.30 ERA with 32 strikeouts.

In 2013, Fien finished the year with a 5–2 record and a 3.92 ERA in 73 appearances for the Twins, striking out 73 and walking 12.

On May 5, 2016, Fien was designated for assignment by the Twins.

=== Los Angeles Dodgers ===
On May 7, 2016, Fien was claimed off waivers by the Los Angeles Dodgers. He joined the Dodgers bullpen on May 28, after spending several weeks with the AAA Oklahoma City Dodgers. He was designated for assignment on September 10, 2016. On September 13, 2016, Fien cleared waivers and was assigned to Triple-A Oklahoma City. In 25 games for the Dodgers he had a 4.21 ERA. He elected free agency after the season on October 5.

=== Seattle Mariners ===
On December 3, 2016, Fien signed a one-year deal with the Seattle Mariners. After 5 appearances early in the season, Fien was outrighted off the 40 man roster on April 12. He had his contract selected to the major league roster again on April 26. He was designated for assignment on May 2, he cleared waivers and was sent outright to Triple-A Tacoma Rainiers the next day.

=== Philadelphia Phillies ===
On May 9, 2017, the Philadelphia Phillies acquired Fien via trade from the Seattle Mariners for cash consideration and assigned him to the AAA Lehigh Valley IronPigs. He had his contract selected to the major league roster on June 8. He was released on September 1, 2017

== Family ==
Fien is the nephew of Republican California State Senators George and Sharon Runner, the first husband and wife in California history to serve concurrently in the California State Legislature when George was a Senator and Sharon an Assemblywoman.
