= Bill Monning =

American politician (born 1951)

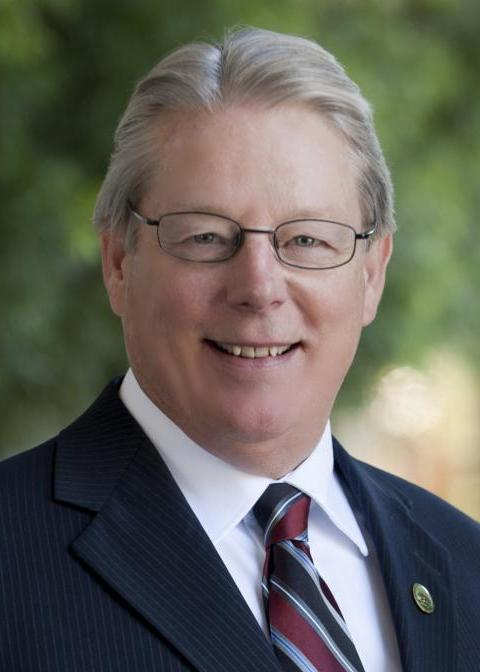
- Official portrait, 2017

Majority Leader of the California Senate
- In office December 17, 2014 – January 7, 2019
- Preceded by: Ellen Corbett
- Succeeded by: Robert Hertzberg

Member of the California State Senate from the 17th district
- In office December 3, 2012 – November 30, 2020
- Preceded by: Sharon Runner (Redistricted)
- Succeeded by: John Laird

Member of the California State Assembly from the 27th district
- In office December 1, 2008 – November 30, 2012
- Preceded by: John Laird
- Succeeded by: Nora Campos

Personal details
- Born: William Wheeler Monning; April 2, 1951 (age 75) Los Angeles, California
- Party: Democratic
- Spouse: Dana Kent
- Education: University of California, Berkeley (BA); University of San Francisco (JD)
- Website: billmonning.com
- Bill Monning Voice recorded in 2017

William Wheeler Monning (born April 2, 1951) is an American politician who was elected to the California State Senate in 2012. A Democrat, he served in the 17th Senate District which encompasses the Central Coast. Monning was reelected to the Senate in 2016 for a second and final term ending in November, 2020. Education, the environment and public health are areas of particular interest to Monning.

Before his election to the State Senate in 2012, Monning served in the California State Assembly, representing the 27th Assembly District.

== Early life and education ==
Bill Monning was born and raised in Southern California. He attended Flintridge Preparatory School from fifth to twelfth grade and participated in athletics including football, basketball, baseball and swimming. His college years were spent in the San Francisco Bay Area where he attended the University of California, Berkeley from 1969 to 1972 and the University of San Francisco School of Law from 1973 to 1976. During this time he also did volunteer work for the United Farm Workers legal department and participated in marches and other activities with farm workers' movements in Delano, Salinas and Modesto, meeting other activists including Jerry Cohen, Cesar Chavez and Dolores Huerta. These experiences with the UFW were influential, "working with the legal department as a volunteer . . . really solidified my interest and purpose in attending law school."

Monning received a B.A. at the University of California, Berkeley and a J.D. degree from the University of San Francisco School of Law. He served as a Senior Fulbright Specialist, receiving Fulbright scholarships to teach and research in Peru and Chile. Additionally, he was a member of the Monterey County Court-directed mediation panel and served for four years as executive director of the Nobel Peace Prize winning organization, International Physicians for the Prevention of Nuclear War.

== Career as attorney ==
After entering the California State Bar, Monning first worked as a staff attorney for the United Farm Workers of America, AFL-CIO (1976–1978). He then became Directing Attorney for California Rural Legal Assistance, Migrant Farm Worker Project (1978–1982). From 1982 through 1987 Monning was the Director of the Salvadoran Medical Relief Fund, and from 1987 through 1991 he was executive director for the International Physicians for the Prevention of Nuclear War (IPPNW). From 1993 until his election to the State Assembly in 2008 he worked in private practice (Labor and Employment law) and taught at both the Monterey Institute of International Studies (currently Middlebury Institute of International Studies) as professor of International Negotiation and Conflict Resolution and as a professor at the Monterey College of Law. Monning is also the former president and co-founder of Global Majority, Inc.

== Career as politician ==
Our advocacy is more critical now than ever before. I've heard people talk about (California) secession ... I counter that, I get the sentiment, but no, we should take our country back.

— People's Rally for Unity and Equality in Carmel, CA January 21, 2017

In 2008 Bill Monning ran for and won the California State District 27 Assembly seat being vacated by termed out John Laird. When asked in an interview with the National Lawyers Guild about why he decided to run for the Assembly in 2008, Monning cited California's structural budget limitations saying California was, "only one of three states in the union that require a 2/3 vote in both houses to pass a budget." This limitation made it difficult to secure adequate funding for such needs as healthcare and education. Monning hoped to work with community groups and other legislators to effect reform in this and other areas including electoral, campaign finance and economic justice.

In 2012 Monning was elected to the California State Senate after the incumbent, Sam Blakeslee, R-San Luis Obispo, chose not to run in the newly drawn 17th Senate district. Monning became Senate Majority leader in 2014 when he was appointed by then State Senate President pro tempore Kevin de León, D-Los Angeles. Monning was reelected to the Senate in 2016 for a second and final term.

In 2016 Monning seriously considered running to fill the seat being vacated by retiring Congressmen Sam Farr but felt he could be more effective in working on climate policy and other important issues as a leader in Sacramento as opposed to being a member of the minority party in Washington.

Monning served as Majority Leader of the California State Senate from 2015 to 2019. In 2019 California Senate President pro tempore Toni Atkins appointed Monning to the California Coastal Conservancy and designated him as California State Senate Majority Leader Emeritus.

He termed-out at the end of his eight years in the State Senate on November 30, 2020. He remains an active member of the State Bar of California and does work as a mediator, trainer, and consultant.

=== Electoral history ===
California State Assembly District 27 election, 2008
| Party | Candidate | Votes | % |
|---|---|---|---|
| Democratic | Bill Monning | 127,102 | 66.0 |
| Republican | Robert Murray | 48,107 | 25.0 |
| Libertarian | Mark Hinkle | 17,435 | 9.0 |
| Total votes | | 192,644 | 100 |
| Turnout | | | |
| Democratic hold | | | |

California State Assembly District 27 election, 2010
| Party | Candidate | Votes | % |
|---|---|---|---|
| Democratic | Bill Monning | 102,124 | 66.8 |
| Republican | Linda Black | 50,831 | 33.2 |
| Total votes | | 152,955 | 100 |
| Turnout | | | |
| Democratic hold | | | |

California State Senate District 17 election, General Election, 2012
| Party | Candidate | Votes | % |
|---|---|---|---|
| Democratic | Bill Monning | 236,213 | 63.3 |
| Republican | Larry Beaman | 136,836 | 36.7 |
| Total votes | | 373,049 | 100 |
| Turnout | | | |
| Democratic hold | | | |

California State Senate District 17 election, General Election, 2016
| Party | Candidate | Votes | % |
|---|---|---|---|
| Democratic | Bill Monning | 268,806 | 65.5 |
| Republican | Palmer Kain | 141,339 | 34.5 |
| Total votes | | 410,145 | 100 |
| Turnout | | | |
| Democratic hold | | | |

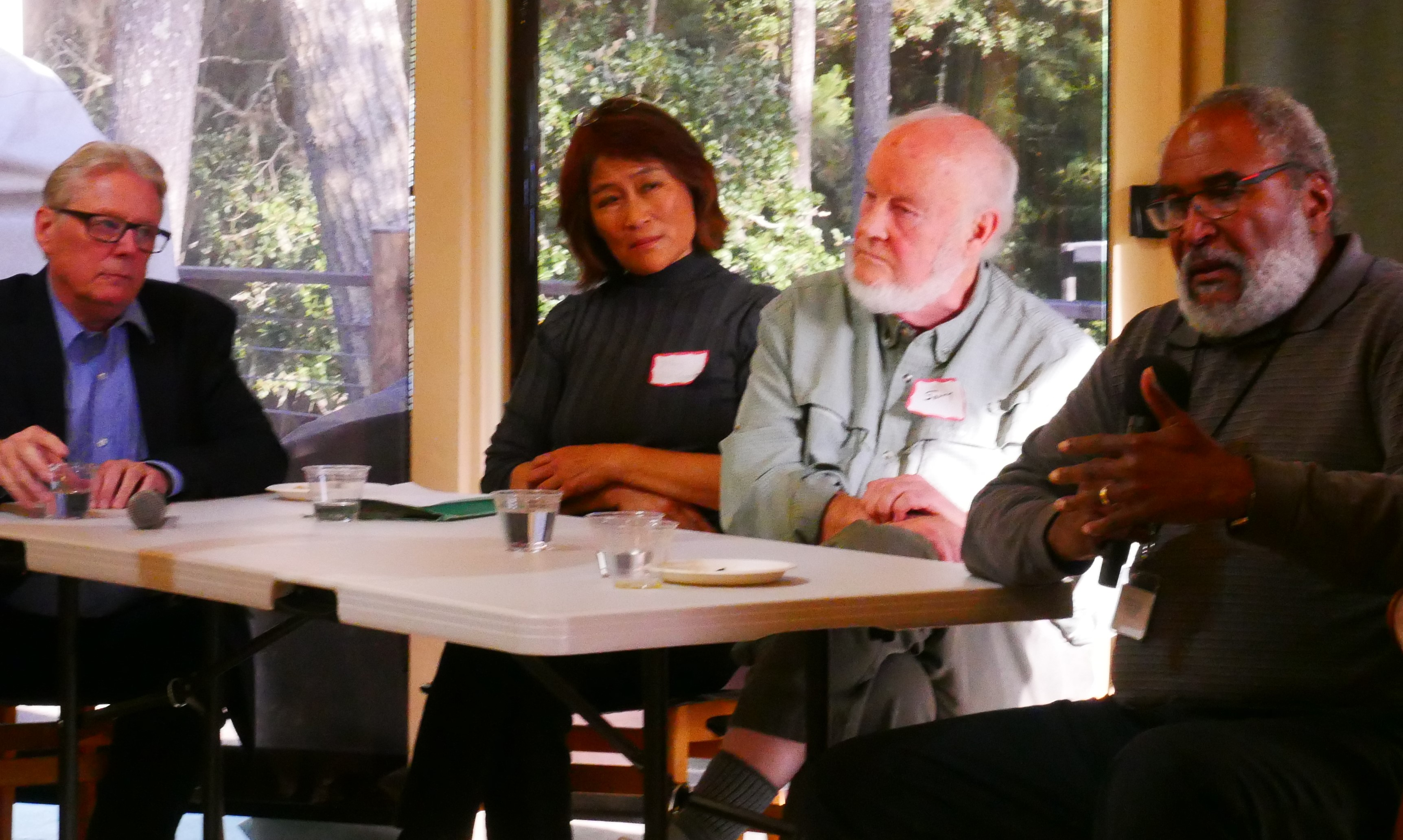
Bill Monning, Mary Hsla-Coron, Jerry Cohen and Mel Mason - panel discussion "What can we learn from 1960's activism to inform today's resistance movements?"

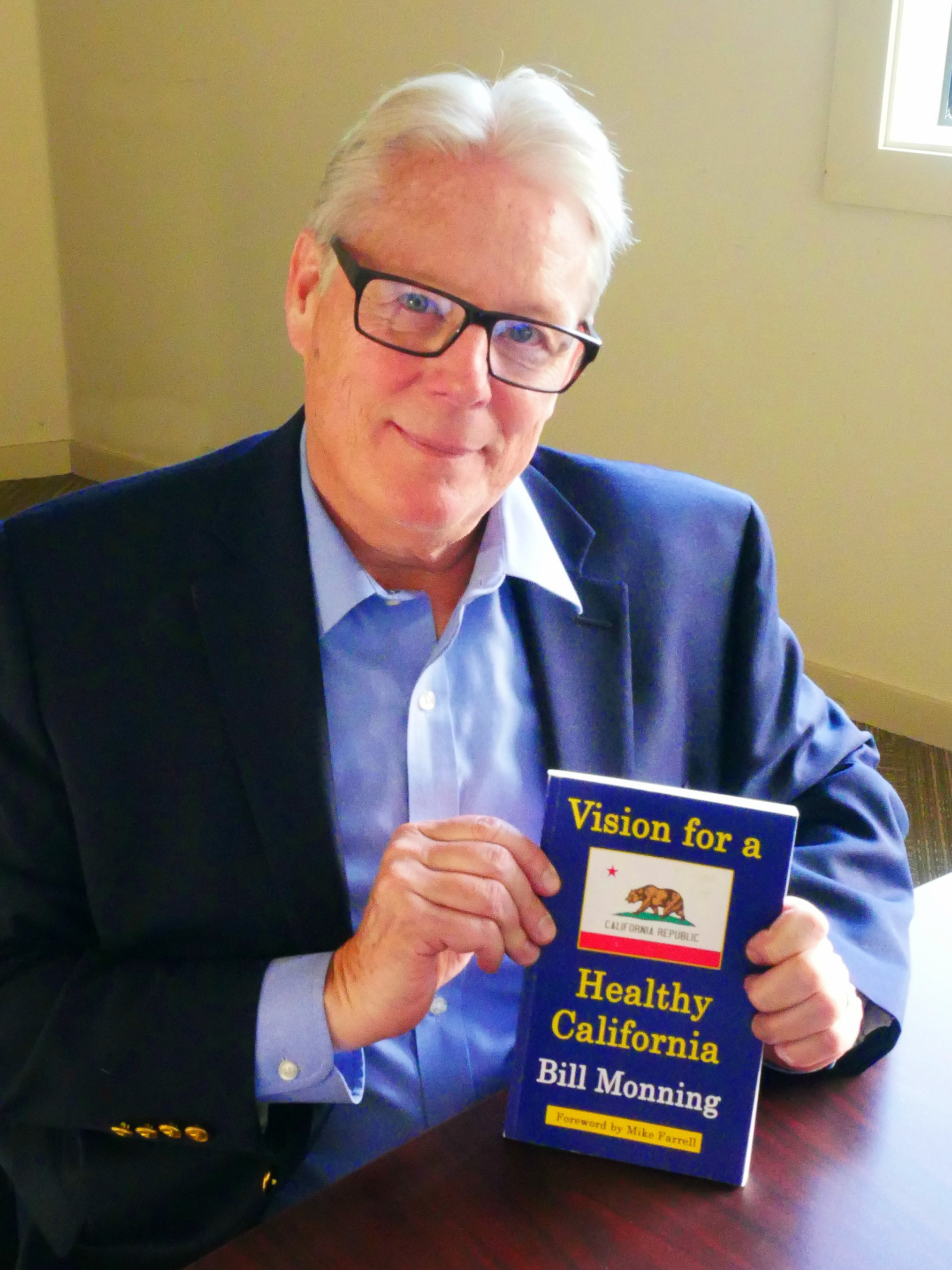
Monning with book - Vision for a Healthy California

Bill Monning March for Science 2017 Monterey, CA

Recorded at a peace rally in Carmel, CA 2017

== Legislation ==
=== Soda tax (SB 622) ===
On February 22, 2013, he introduced SB 622, which would impose a 12 cent tax on each can of soda, as well as create the Children's Health Promotion Fund, which would direct the money the tax raised to childhood obesity-preventing measures such as improving the quality of school lunches. About three months later, the bill died in committee.

=== Farmworker Protection ===
Monning authored a bill to protect California farm workers from sexual harassment and violence. Signed by Governor Jerry Brown on September 28, 2014, SB 1087 followed a 2013 investigation by Univision, UC Berkeley's Investigative Reporting Program FRONTLINE, and the Center for Investigative Reporting. The investigation found that hundreds of female agriculture workers said they had been harassed and assaulted in the fields with minimal response from their supervisors or from law enforcement. The law took effect on January 1, 2015. "Female farmworkers are among the most vulnerable and invisible of the state's farm worker population," said Monning. "[SB 1087] will require sexual harassment prevention training for farm labor contractors, supervisors, and employees, and is the first step to help protect these workers from unwanted sexual advances and sexual violence."

Senator Monning successfully authored another bill, SB 168 in 2013, to help agricultural workers get back wages and penalties owed by state-licensed farm labor contractors. According to Monning, some California contractors had fraudulently dissolved and moved their assets to new corporations, leaving farm workers without anyone to file a claim against. "This measure is modeled after previous legislation in the garment manufacturing and car wash industries to address fraudulent successor business scams," said Monning "The workers most affected and victimized by such unscrupulous practices are farm workers."

=== Death with Dignity ===
In 2015 Monning co-sponsored, with Lois Wolk (D-Davis), SB 128, the California End of Life Option Act. The bill was modeled after Oregon's Death With Dignity Act (1994). The law authorizes adults with six months or less to live to request a doctor's prescription for life-ending medication. It passed the California Senate easily, but stalled in the Assembly. In a legislative session in September dedicated to healthcare, several amendments were introduced, and eventually the bill passed in the Assembly 42–33, and the Senate 23-14 It was co-authored by Assembly Member Susan Talamantes Eggman (D-Stockton). California governor Jerry Brown signed the California End of Life Option Act on October 5, 2015, and it went into effect on June 9, 2016. California thus became the fifth state to pass a Death With Dignity law. In a 2018 interview with the Monterey County Weekly Monning claimed that the End of Life Option Act was "one of his greatest legislative achievements". He was very moved by the testimony of terminally ill people in Sacramento, "They knew that they weren't going to be able to benefit from it (the Act), and yet they still came, facing their terminal conditions, making sure that those who followed them would have options that they didn't have".

=== Climate Change ===
Senator Monning believes climate change is the largest long-term threat to humanity and that it will also negatively affect public health and coastal communities. In the 2015–2016 legislative session Senator Monning co-authored Senate Bill 350, the Clean Energy and Pollution Reduction Act of 2015. This complex bill was intended to increase the state's energy efficiency, reduce petroleum use in vehicles and set new standards for California's Renewable Portfolio Standard (RPS). Under this bill the state of California would be required to generate half of its electricity from renewable sources by 2030. The bill was signed by Governor Jerry Brown October 7, 2015. Other sponsors of the bill were primary sponsor Senator Kevin de León, Senator Loni Hancock, Senator Mark Leno, Assemblyman Das Williams and Assemblyman Kevin McCarty.

=== Drinking Water Fund ===
Monning authored the Safe, Clean, Affordable Drinking Water Act of 2019 (SB 200) making available $1.3 billion over ten years in funding for community projects though California State Water Resources Control Board. The bill was signed into law in July 2019, making some 300 community with limited access to clean water eligible for funding to help them build or maintain new wells and water treatment facilities.

== Personal life ==
He and his wife, Dana T. Kent, a family physician, reside in Carmel, California. They have two daughters and three grandchildren.

== Bibliography ==
- Vision for a Healthy California, Foreword by Mike Farrell, Gui Mundo Publishing Company, 2010, ISBN 978-0983030805
- Voices of Change: The People's Oral History Project Interviews with Monterey County Activists and Organizers 1934–2015, Author Gary Karnes, foreword by Senator Bill Monning, Co-authors Karen Araujo and Juan Martinez, Park Place Publications, January 15, 2016, ISBN 978-1943887002

California Senate
| Preceded by Ellen Corbett | Majority Leader of the California Senate; 2014–2019 | Succeeded by Robert Hertzberg |
