= Barbara Alby =

American politician (1946–2012)

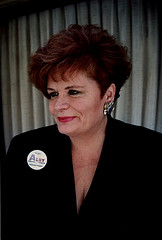
- A portrait of Barbara Alby

California State Board of Equalization Board Member, 2nd District
- In office March 10, 2010 – December 31, 2010
- Governor: Arnold Schwarzenegger
- Preceded by: Bill Leonard
- Succeeded by: Sean Wallentine

Member of the California State Assembly from the 5th district
- In office July 30, 1993 – November 30, 1998
- Preceded by: B. T. Collins
- Succeeded by: Dave Cox

Personal details
- Born: August 9, 1946 Sacramento, California, U.S.
- Died: December 9, 2012 (aged 66) Folsom, California, U.S.
- Party: Republican
- Spouse: Dennis Alby
- Children: 5
- Profession: Politician

Barbara Alby (August 9, 1946 – December 9, 2012) was an American politician who lived in Fair Oaks, California and was a member of the Republican Party.

== Early life ==
Barbara Alby was born on August 9, 1946 in the Town and Country area of Sacramento, California. She was the oldest of four siblings. Her father was a butcher in local grocery stores. Her parents divorced when she was 16 years old. She attended St. Philomene's grade school and Loretto High School. She then transferred to Encina High School. She was a member of the class of 1964, but did not graduate.

Alby moved to Wisconsin with her second husband and she lived there for eight years. She received her high school diploma from a night school in Wisconsin. Alby dropped out of the University of Wisconsin–Madison. She went on welfare at the age of 19 until her benefits were cut.

== Personal life ==
Alby married twice. She eloped with her first husband at the age of 17 in 1964. She had two daughters with her first husband. She married her second husband, Dennis Alby and had three children.

== Career ==
She first sought elective office in 1991, running in a special election for the Sacramento-based 5th district in the California State Assembly. She lost that race to fellow Republican B. T. Collins, onetime Chief of Staff to Democratic former Gov. Jerry Brown, and narrowly lost to him again in the 1992 Republican primary. After Collins died, Alby won a 1993 special election to succeed him and occupied the Assembly seat until 1998 when term limits forced her from office. In 1996, she wrote legislation for Megan's Law in California. In 1998 she ran for the U.S. House of Representatives, attempting to succeed veteran Democrat Vic Fazio in the Sacramento-based 3rd district after Fazio retired after redistricting made the district more politically competitive. Alby lost the Republican primary to moderate businessman Doug Ose by 20 points.

Later, Alby assumed the position of chief deputy to Board of Equalization Member Bill Leonard. She occupied that post until Leonard resigned in March 2010, at which point she became the Acting Board Member for the seat—during the middle of the period for candidates to file paperwork to appear on the ballot to fill the Board seat in the June primary election, so with just days for candidates to qualify to appear on the ballot, Leonard enabled Alby to run as "Acting Board Member" on the ballot.

During the June 2010 primary election, Alby became embroiled in controversy when the Capitol Weekly newspaper revealed that Indian casinos had spent nearly $200,000 on Alby's behalf in the election. Beside Indian casinos, the largest contributors to Alby's campaign were Alby herself, Senator Roy Ashburn, and Bill Leonard, her former boss.

Alby resigned as acting Board of Equalization member on December 31, 2010, and was succeeded by acting Board Member Sean Wallentine.

== Death ==
Barbara Alby died of a heart attack the morning of December 9, 2012.

California Assembly
Preceded by B. T. Collins	California State Assemblymember; 5th District; 1993–1998	Succeeded by Dave Cox
Political offices
Preceded by Bill Leonard	California State Board of Equalization Member; 2nd District; 2010	Succeeded by Sean Wallentine
