= Santa Cruz AIDS Project =

California non-profit organization

- Type: Non-profit organization
- Founded: 1985, Santa Cruz
- Headquarters: 542 Ocean St Suite I, Santa Cruz, CA 95060
- Number of employees: 4+ Staff, 20+ volunteers
- Website: www.scapsite.org/

Santa Cruz AIDS Project (SCAP) is a non-profit organization based in Santa Cruz, California which offers free client services for those who are HIV positive, as well as a variety of services for HIV prevention, including education and HIV testing.

SCAP also has created some programs around the harm reduction model, seeking ways to reduce or make more safe harmful behaviors amongst populations that are at high risk for contracting HIV, such as the homeless and sex workers.

== Mission statement ==
"The Santa Cruz AIDS Project was founded in 1985 by a group of dedicated volunteers with the mission to lead a community response to the ever-changing HIV/AIDS pandemic, to enhance the quality of life through powerful support programs, to advocate effectively for the health and dignity of those living with HIV, and to reduce the spreads of HIV through results-oriented and measured education and prevention programs that are tailored to specific at-risk community groups and focused on the health of Santa Cruz County."
