= California's 17th senatorial district =

American legislative district

California's 17th State Senate district
Current senator
John Laird; D–Santa Cruz
- Population (2010) • Voting age • Citizen voting age: 931,341; 724,678; 615,065
- Demographics: 56.49% White; 2.33% Black; 30.95% Latino; 8.06% Asian; 0.95% Native American; 0.39% Hawaiian/Pacific Islander; 0.30% other; 0.53% remainder of multiracial
- Registered voters: 567,749
- Registration: 46.61% Democratic; 23.90% Republican; 23.72% No party preference

California's 17th senatorial district is one of 40 California State Senate districts. It is currently represented by Democrat John Laird of Santa Cruz.

== District profile ==
The district encompasses the Big Sur section of the Central Coast, including Santa Cruz, San Benito, and Monterey Counties, along with northern San Luis Obispo County.

== Election results from statewide races ==
Year	Office	Results
2021	Recall	No 65.1 – 34.9%
2020	President	Biden 66.8 – 30.8%
2018	Governor	Newsom 63.8 – 36.2%
2018	Senator	Feinstein 54.0 – 46.0%
2016	President	Clinton 63.4 – 29.6%
2016	Senator	Harris 67.0 – 33.0%
2014	Governor	Brown 66.0 – 34.0%
2012	President	Obama 62.8 – 33.9%
2012	Senator	Feinstein 65.1 – 34.9%

== List of senators representing the district ==
Due to redistricting, the 17th district has been moved around different parts of the state. The current iteration resulted from the 2021 redistricting by the California Citizens Redistricting Commission.

Senators	Party	Years served	Counties represented	Notes
Charles Dent Reynolds	Democratic	January 8, 1883 – January 5, 1885	Calaveras, Tuolumne	
Andrew B. Beauvais	Republican	January 5, 1885 – January 3, 1887	Calaveras, Tuolumne	
Henry Vrooman	Republican	January 3, 1887 – January 7, 1889	Alameda	
William E. Dargie	Republican	January 7, 1889 – January 2, 1893	Alameda	
William J. Dunn	Democratic	January 2, 1893 – January 4, 1897	San Francisco	
Samuel Braunhart	Democratic	January 4, 1897 – June 28, 1900	San Francisco	Resigned to become a member of the San Francisco Board of Supervisors.
Vacant		June 28, 1900 – January 1, 1901	San Francisco	
Joseph M. Plunkett	Democratic	January 1, 1901 – January 2, 1905	San Francisco	
Frank A. Markey	Republican	January 2, 1905 – January 4, 1909	San Francisco	
Thomas F. Finn	Republican	January 4, 1909 – January 6, 1913	San Francisco	
Archibald E. Campbell	Democratic	January 6, 1913 – January 8, 1917	Monterey, San Benito, San Luis Obispo	
Elmer S. Rigdon	Democratic	January 8, 1917 – December 13, 1922	Monterey, San Luis Obispo	Died in office.
Vacant		December 13, 1922 – March 5, 1923	Monterey, San Luis Obispo	
Ralph Leon Hughes	Republican	March 5, 1923 – January 5, 1925	Monterey, San Luis Obispo	Sworn in after winning special election.
C. C. Baker	Republican	January 5, 1925 – January 2, 1933	Monterey, San Luis Obispo	
William Richard Sharkey	Republican	January 2, 1933 – January 4, 1937	Contra Costa	
Truman H. DeLap	Republican	January 4, 1937 – January 3, 1949	Contra Costa	
George Miller Jr.	Democratic	January 3, 1949 – January 2, 1967	Contra Costa	
Donald L. Grunsky	Republican	January 2, 1967 – November 30, 1976	Monterey, San Benito, San Luis Obispo, Santa Cruz	
Bob Nimmo	Republican	December 6, 1976 – November 30, 1980	Monterey, San Benito, Santa Barbara, Santa Cruz	
Henry J. Mello	Democratic	December 1, 1980 – November 30, 1992	Monterey, San Benito, Santa Barbara, Santa Cruz	
Henry J. Mello	Democratic	December 1, 1980 – November 30, 1992	Monterey, San Benito, Santa Clara, Santa Cruz	
Don Rogers	Republican	December 15, 1992 – November 30, 1996	Inyo, Kern, Los Angeles, San Bernardino	Took his seat in the 17th State Senate district after resigning from the 16th State Senate district.
William J. Knight	Republican	December 2, 1996 – May 7, 2004	Inyo, Kern, Los Angeles, San Bernardino	Died in office.
Vacant		May 7, 2004 – December 6, 2004	Inyo, Kern, Los Angeles, San Bernardino	
George Runner	Republican	December 6, 2004 – December 21, 2010	Kern, Los Angeles, San Bernardino, Ventura	Resigned from the State Senate.
Vacant		December 21, 2010 – February 18, 2011	Kern, Los Angeles, San Bernardino, Ventura	
Sharon Runner	Republican	February 18, 2011 – November 30, 2012	Kern, Los Angeles, San Bernardino, Ventura	Sworn in after winning special election.
Bill Monning	Democratic	December 3, 2012 – November 30, 2020	Monterey, San Luis Obispo, Santa Clara, Santa Cruz	
John Laird	Democratic	December 7, 2020 – present	Monterey, San Luis Obispo, Santa Clara, Santa Cruz	

== Election results (1990-present) ==
=== 2024 ===
2024 California State Senate 17th district election
Primary election
Party	Candidate	Votes	%
Democratic	John Laird (incumbent)	143,912	64.5
Republican	Tony Virrueta	48,829	21.9
Republican	Eric Tao	25,845	11.6
Libertarian	Michael Oxford	4,591	2.1
Total votes		223,177	100.0
General election
Democratic	John Laird (incumbent)	269,862	65.0
Republican	Tony Virrueta	144,992	35.0
Total votes		414,854	100.0
Democratic hold			

=== 2020 ===
2020 California State Senate 17th district election
Primary election
Party	Candidate	Votes	%
Democratic	John Laird	138,986	44.4
Republican	Vicki Nohrden	98,649	31.5
Democratic	Maria Cadenas	65,525	20.9
Democratic	John M. Nevill	10,040	3.2
Total votes		313,200	100.0
General election
Democratic	John Laird	320,090	64.7
Republican	Vicki Nohrden	174,587	35.3
Total votes		494,677	100.0
Democratic hold			

=== 2016 ===
2016 California State Senate 17th district election
Primary election
Party	Candidate	Votes	%
Democratic	Bill Monning (incumbent)	185,586	68.8
Republican	Palmer Kain	84,142	31.2
Total votes		269,728	100.0
General election
Democratic	Bill Monning (incumbent)	268,806	65.5
Republican	Palmer Kain	141,339	34.5
Total votes		410,145	100.0
Democratic hold			

=== 2012 ===
2012 California State Senate 17th district election
Primary election
Party	Candidate	Votes	%
Democratic	Bill Monning	110,890	59.4
Republican	Larry Beaman	75,713	40.6
Total votes		186,603	100.0
General election
Democratic	Bill Monning	236,213	63.3
Republican	Larry Beaman	136,836	36.7
Total votes		373,049	100.0
Democratic gain from Republican			

=== 2011 (special) ===
2011 California State Senate 17th district special election Vacancy resulting from the resignation of George Runner
Party	Candidate	Votes	%
Republican	Sharon Runner	44,238	65.3
Democratic	Darren W. Parker	23,534	34.7
Total votes		67,772	100.0
Republican hold			

=== 2008 ===
2008 California State Senate 17th district election
Party	Candidate	Votes	%
Republican	George Runner (incumbent)	182,295	54.8
Democratic	Bruce McFarland	150,060	45.2
Total votes		332,355	100.0
Republican hold			

=== 2004 ===
2004 California State Senate 17th district election
Party	Candidate	Votes	%
Republican	George Runner	179,992	59.7
Democratic	Jonathan Daniel Kraut	109,037	36.2
Libertarian	John S. Ballard	12,479	4.1
Total votes		301,508	100.0
Republican hold			

=== 2000 ===
2000 California State Senate 17th district election
Party	Candidate	Votes	%
Republican	William J. Knight (incumbent)	172,723	64.4
Democratic	Richard Lott	84,427	31.5
Libertarian	John R. Gibson	7,667	2.9
Natural Law	Douglas R. Wallack	3,543	1.3
Total votes		268,360	100.0
Republican hold			

=== 1996 ===
1996 California State Senate 17th district election
Party	Candidate	Votes	%
Republican	William J. Knight	163,531	66.6
Democratic	Steven A. Figueroa	61,962	33.4
Total votes		225,493	100.0
Republican hold			

=== 1992 ===
1992 California State Senate 17th district election
Party	Candidate	Votes	%
Republican	Don Rogers (incumbent)	136,298	52.2
Democratic	William M. Olenick	101,715	38.9
Libertarian	Fred Heiser	23,340	8.9
Total votes		261,353	100.0
Republican gain from Democratic			

== See also ==
- California State Senate
- California State Senate districts
- Districts in California
