= California's 53rd State Assembly district =

American legislative district

Current assemblymember
Michelle Rodriguez; D–Pomona
- Population (2020): | population = 475,714
- Demographics: 14.26% White; 5.23% Black; 66.16% Latino; 11.35% Asian; 0.23% Native American; 0.17% Hawaiian/Pacific Islander; 2.09% other; 0.37% remainder of multiracial

California's 53rd State Assembly district is one of 80 California State Assembly districts. Since 2024, it is represented by Democrat Michelle Rodriguez of Pomona.

== District profile ==
Since the 2021 California redistricting, the district includes Pomona, Montclair, and much of Chino, Ontario, and Upland.

Los Angeles County – 1.6% San Bernardino County – 14.7%

- Pomona – 100%
- Chino – 90.3%
- Montclair – 100%
- Ontario - 86.7%
- Upland - 49.1%

== Election results from statewide races ==
Year	Office	Results
2021	Recall	No 83.8 – 16.2%
2020	President	Biden 78.6 - 17.6%
2018	Governor	Newsom 84.6 – 15.4%
2018	Senator	Feinstein 53.9 – 46.1%
2016	President	Clinton 84.8 – 9.6%
2016	Senator	Harris 52.7 – 47.3%
2014	Governor	Brown 85.2 – 14.8%
2012	President	Obama 84.6 – 12.6%
2012	Senator	Feinstein 86.0 – 14.0%

== List of assembly members representing the district ==
Due to redistricting, the 53rd district has been moved around different parts of the state. The current iteration resulted from the 2021 redistricting by the California Citizens Redistricting Commission.

Assembly members	Party	Years served	Counties represented	Notes
Frank J. Moffitt	Democratic Party	January 5, 1885 – January 3, 1887	Alameda	
M. D. Hyde	Republican	January 3, 1887 – January 5, 1891	Alameda	
J. G. McCall	Republican	January 5, 1891 – January 2, 1893	Alameda	
Phelps Ralph Adams	Democratic	January 2, 1893 – January 7, 1895	Santa Cruz	
B. S. Osborn	Republican	January 7, 1895 – January 4, 1897	Santa Cruz	
Frank Aldridge	Democratic	January 4, 1897 – January 2, 1899	Santa Cruz	
George G. Radcliff	Republican	January 2, 1899 – January 5, 1903	Santa Cruz	
Henry Ward Brown	Republican	January 5, 1903 – January 2, 1905	San Mateo	
Richard H. Jury	Republican	January 2, 1905 – January 4, 1909	San Mateo	
Hjalmar Edwin Holmquist	Republican	January 4, 1909 – January 2, 1911	San Mateo	
Henry Ward Brown	Republican	January 2, 1911 – January 6, 1913	San Mateo	
Abram B. Green	Republican	January 6, 1913 – January 4, 1915	San Luis Obispo	
Elmer S. Rigdon	Democratic	January 4, 1915 – January 8, 1917	San Luis Obispo	
Carlton W. Greene	Republican	January 8, 1917 – January 8, 1923	San Luis Obispo	
Alexander McMillan	Democratic	January 8, 1923 – January 5, 1925	San Luis Obispo	
Samuel V. Wright	Republican	January 5, 1925 – January 3, 1927	San Luis Obispo	
Chris N. Jespersen	Republican	January 3, 1927 – January 5, 1931	San Luis Obispo	
Frederick F. Houser	Republican	January 5, 1931 – January 2, 1933	Los Angeles	
E. Valsaine Latham	Republican	January 2, 1933 – January 2, 1939	Los Angeles	
Frederick F. Houser	Republican	January 2, 1939 – January 4, 1943	Los Angeles	
Lothrop Smith	Republican	January 4, 1943 – January 8, 1945	Los Angeles	
Montivel A. Burke	Republican	January 8, 1945 – January 7, 1963	Los Angeles	
Mervyn Dymally	Democratic	January 7, 1963 – January 2, 1967	Los Angeles	
Bill Greene	Democratic	January 2, 1967 – November 30, 1974	Los Angeles	
Paul Bannai	Republican	December 2, 1974 – November 30, 1980	Los Angeles	
Richard Floyd	Democratic	December 1, 1980 – November 30, 1992	Los Angeles	
Debra Bowen	Democratic	December 7, 1992 – November 30, 1998	Los Angeles	
George Nakano	Democratic	December 7, 1998 – November 30, 2004	Los Angeles	
Mike Gordon	Democratic	December 6, 2004 – June 25, 2005	Los Angeles	Died in office from a brain tumor.
Vacant		June 25, 2005 – September 21, 2005	Los Angeles	
Ted Lieu	Democratic	September 21, 2005 – November 30, 2010	Los Angeles	Sworn in after winning special election to fill the vacancy left by the passing of Gordon.
Betsy Butler	Democratic	December 6, 2010 – November 30, 2012	Los Angeles	
John Pérez	Democratic	December 3, 2012 – November 30, 2014	Los Angeles	
Miguel Santiago	Democratic	December 1, 2014 – November 30, 2022	Los Angeles	
Freddie Rodriguez	Democratic	December 5, 2022 – November 30, 2024	Los Angeles, San Bernardino	
Michelle Rodriguez	Democratic	December 2, 2024 – present	Los Angeles, San Bernardino	

== Election results (1990–present) ==
=== 2024 ===
2024 California State Assembly 53rd district election
Primary election
Party	Candidate	Votes	%
Republican	Nick Wilson	23,050	43.0
Democratic	Michelle Rodriguez	10,835	20.2
Democratic	Robert S. Torres	8,894	16.6
Democratic	Javier Hernandez	8,422	15.7
Democratic	Carlos Goytia	2,348	4.4
Total votes		53,549	100.0
General election
Democratic	Michelle Rodriguez	83,371	57.6
Republican	Nick Wilson	61,380	42.4
Total votes		144,751	100.0
Democratic hold			

=== 2022 ===
2022 California State Assembly 53rd district election
Primary election
Party	Candidate	Votes	%
Democratic	Freddie Rodriguez (incumbent)	27,179	60.6
Republican	Toni Holle	17,646	39.4
Total votes		44,825	100.0
General election
Democratic	Freddie Rodriguez (incumbent)	49,221	60.1
Republican	Toni Holle	32,684	39.9
Total votes		81,905	100.0
Democratic hold			

=== 2020 ===
2020 California State Assembly 53rd district election
Primary election
Party	Candidate	Votes	%
Democratic	Miguel Santiago (incumbent)	35,515	62.9
Democratic	Godfrey Santos Plata	20,923	37.1
Total votes		56,438	100.0
General election
Democratic	Miguel Santiago (incumbent)	63,776	56.3
Democratic	Godfrey Santos Plata	49,580	43.7
Total votes		113,356	100.0
Democratic hold			

=== 2018 ===
2018 California State Assembly 53rd district election
Primary election
Party	Candidate	Votes	%
Democratic	Miguel Santiago (incumbent)	24,134	69.0
Democratic	Kevin Hee Young Jang	5,779	16.5
Libertarian	Michael A. Lewis	2,710	7.7
Democratic	Rae Elisabeth Henry	2,367	6.8
Total votes		34,990	100.0
General election
Democratic	Miguel Santiago (incumbent)	57,388	71.4
Democratic	Kevin Hee Young Jang	23,002	28.6
Total votes		80,390	100.0
Democratic hold			

=== 2016 ===
2016 California State Assembly 53rd district election
Primary election
Party	Candidate	Votes	%
Democratic	Miguel Santiago (incumbent)	22,254	45.1
Democratic	Sandra Mendoza	20,388	41.3
Democratic	Kevin H. Jang	6,688	13.6
Total votes		49,330	100.0
General election
Democratic	Miguel Santiago (incumbent)	50,958	58.2
Democratic	Sandra Mendoza	36,583	41.8
Total votes		87,541	100.0
Democratic hold			

=== 2014 ===
2014 California State Assembly 53rd district election
Primary election
Party	Candidate	Votes	%
Democratic	Miguel Santiago	9,387	56.1
Democratic	Sandra Mendoza	3,953	23.6
Democratic	Michelle "Hope" Walker	1,964	11.7
Democratic	Michael "Mike" Aldapa	1,423	8.5
Total votes		16,727	100.0
General election
Democratic	Miguel Santiago	20,472	63.5
Democratic	Sandra Mendoza	11,753	36.5
Total votes		32,225	100.0
Democratic hold			

=== 2012 ===
2012 California State Assembly 53rd district election
Primary election
Party	Candidate	Votes	%
Democratic	John Pérez (incumbent)	10,051	58.5
Republican	Jose Trinidad Aguilar	2,889	16.8
Democratic	Michael "Mike" Aldapa	2,494	14.5
Democratic	Roger A. Young	1,738	10.1
Total votes		17,172	100.0
General election
Democratic	John Pérez (incumbent)	61,651	82.8
Republican	Jose Trinidad Aguilar	12,803	17.2
Total votes		74,454	100.0
Democratic hold			

=== 2010 ===
2010 California State Assembly 53rd district election
Party	Candidate	Votes	%
Democratic	Betsy Butler	73,344	50.3
Republican	Nathan Mintz	62,770	43.0
Green	Lisa Ann Green	6,526	4.4
Libertarian	Ethan Musulin	3,446	2.3
Total votes		146,086	100.0
Democratic hold			

=== 2008 ===
2008 California State Assembly 53rd district election
Party	Candidate	Votes	%
Democratic	Ted Lieu (incumbent)	127,117	67.3
Republican	Thomas Vidal	61,692	32.7
Total votes		188,809	100.0
Democratic hold			

=== 2006 ===
2006 California State Assembly 53rd district election
Party	Candidate	Votes	%
Democratic	Ted Lieu (incumbent)	75,491	58.5
Republican	Mary Ford	47,534	36.8
Green	Peter Thottam	3,070	2.4
Peace and Freedom	Karl Abrams	2,997	2.3
Total votes		129,092	100.0
Democratic hold			

=== 2005 (special) ===
2005 California State Assembly 53rd district special election Vacancy resulting from the death of Mike Gordon
Party	Candidate	Votes	%
Democratic	Ted Lieu	25,285	59.9
Republican	Mary Ford	8,108	19.2
Republican	Paul Nowatka	4,928	11.7
Republican	Greg Hill	2,109	5.0
Republican	Paul Whitehead	912	2.2
Peace and Freedom	James Smith	843	2.0
Total votes		42,185	100.0
Democratic hold			

=== 2004 ===
2004 California State Assembly 53rd district election
Party	Candidate	Votes	%
Democratic	Mike Gordon	95,156	50.4
Republican	Greg Hill	79,505	42.1
Libertarian	Ethan M. Boivie	8,942	4.7
Peace and Freedom	James R. Smith	5,028	2.7
Total votes		188,631	100.0
Democratic hold			

=== 2002 ===
2002 California State Assembly 53rd district election
Party	Candidate	Votes	%
Democratic	George Nakano (incumbent)	69,135	61.3
Republican	Linda P. Wilson	43,589	38.7
Total votes		112,724	100.0
Democratic hold			

=== 2000 ===
2000 California State Assembly 53rd district election
Party	Candidate	Votes	%
Democratic	George Nakano (incumbent)	104,431	64.3
Republican	Gerald N. Felano	53,017	32.7
Libertarian	Phil Howitt	4,852	3.0
Total votes		162,300	100.0
Democratic hold			

=== 1998 ===
1998 California State Assembly 53rd district election
Party	Candidate	Votes	%
Democratic	George Nakano	75,159	60.6
Republican	Bill Eggers	48,880	39.4
Total votes		123,959	100.0
Democratic hold			

=== 1996 ===
1996 California State Assembly 53rd district election
Party	Candidate	Votes	%
Democratic	Debra Bowen (incumbent)	88,238	57.7
Republican	Dan Walker	64,761	42.3
Total votes		152,999	100.0
Democratic hold			

=== 1994 ===
1994 California State Assembly 53rd district election
Party	Candidate	Votes	%
Democratic	Debra Bowen (incumbent)	66,114	51.2
Republican	Julian Sirull	56,906	44.0
Libertarian	William N. Gaillard	3,539	2.7
Peace and Freedom	J. Kevin Bishop	2,644	2.0
Total votes		129,203	100.0
Democratic hold			

=== 1992 ===
1992 California State Assembly 53rd district election
Party	Candidate	Votes	%
Democratic	Debra Bowen	95,703	54.1
Republican	W. Brad Parton	72,870	41.2
Libertarian	William N. Gaillard	8,248	4.7
Total votes		176,821	100.0
Democratic hold			

=== 1990 ===
1990 California State Assembly 53rd district election
Party	Candidate	Votes	%
Democratic	Richard Floyd (incumbent)	35,440	60.3
Republican	Kevin B. Davis	23,372	39.7
Total votes		58,812	100.0
Democratic hold			

== See also ==
- California State Assembly
- California State Assembly districts
- Districts in California
