= Julia Brownley =

American politician (born 1952)

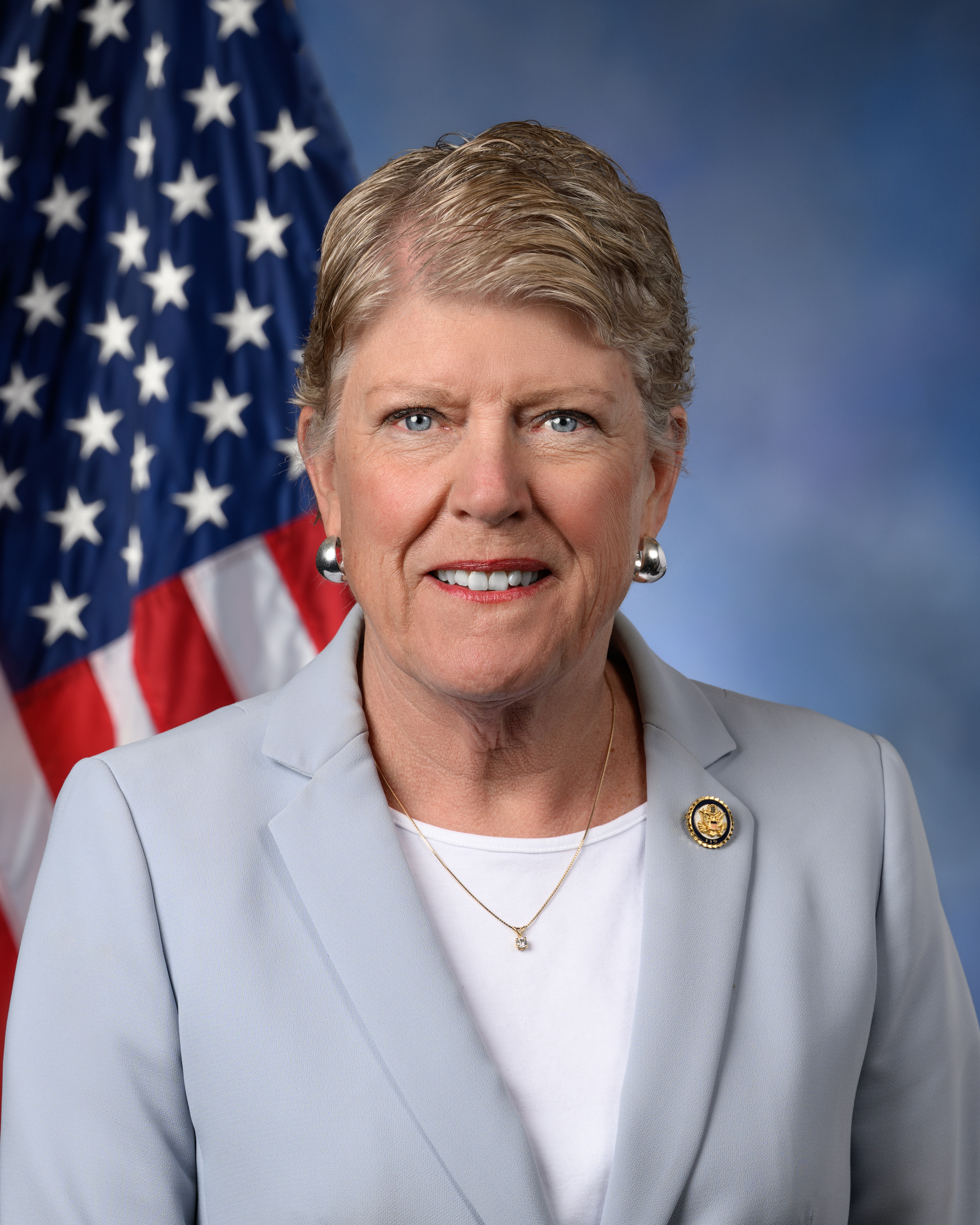
- Official portrait, 2025

Member of the U.S. House of Representatives from California's 26th district
- Incumbent
- Assumed office January 3, 2013
- Preceded by: Elton Gallegly (redistricted)

Member of the California State Assembly from the 41st district
- In office December 4, 2006 – November 30, 2012
- Preceded by: Fran Pavley
- Succeeded by: Chris Holden

Personal details
- Born: Julia Andrews Brownley; August 28, 1952 (age 74) Aiken, South Carolina, U.S.
- Party: Democratic
- Children: 2
- Education: George Washington University (BA); American University (MBA)
- Website: House website Campaign website
- Brownley's voice Brownley supporting the READ Act. Recorded October 26, 2015

Julia Andrews Brownley (born August 28, 1952) is an American businesswoman and politician who has been the United States representative for California's 26th congressional district since 2013. A Democrat, she served in the California State Assembly from 2006 to 2012. Before her political career, she worked in marketing and sales.

== Early life, education, and career ==
Brownley grew up in Virginia, and attended Fairfax Hall, a girls' boarding school in Waynesboro, for four years. Brownley received a bachelor's degree in political science from Mount Vernon College for Women of George Washington University in 1975 and a master's degree in business administration from American University in 1979.

Brownley served on the Santa Monica-Malibu Unified School District Board of Education from 1994 to 2006. During her time on the school board, she served three terms as president.

== California State Assembly (2007–2013) ==
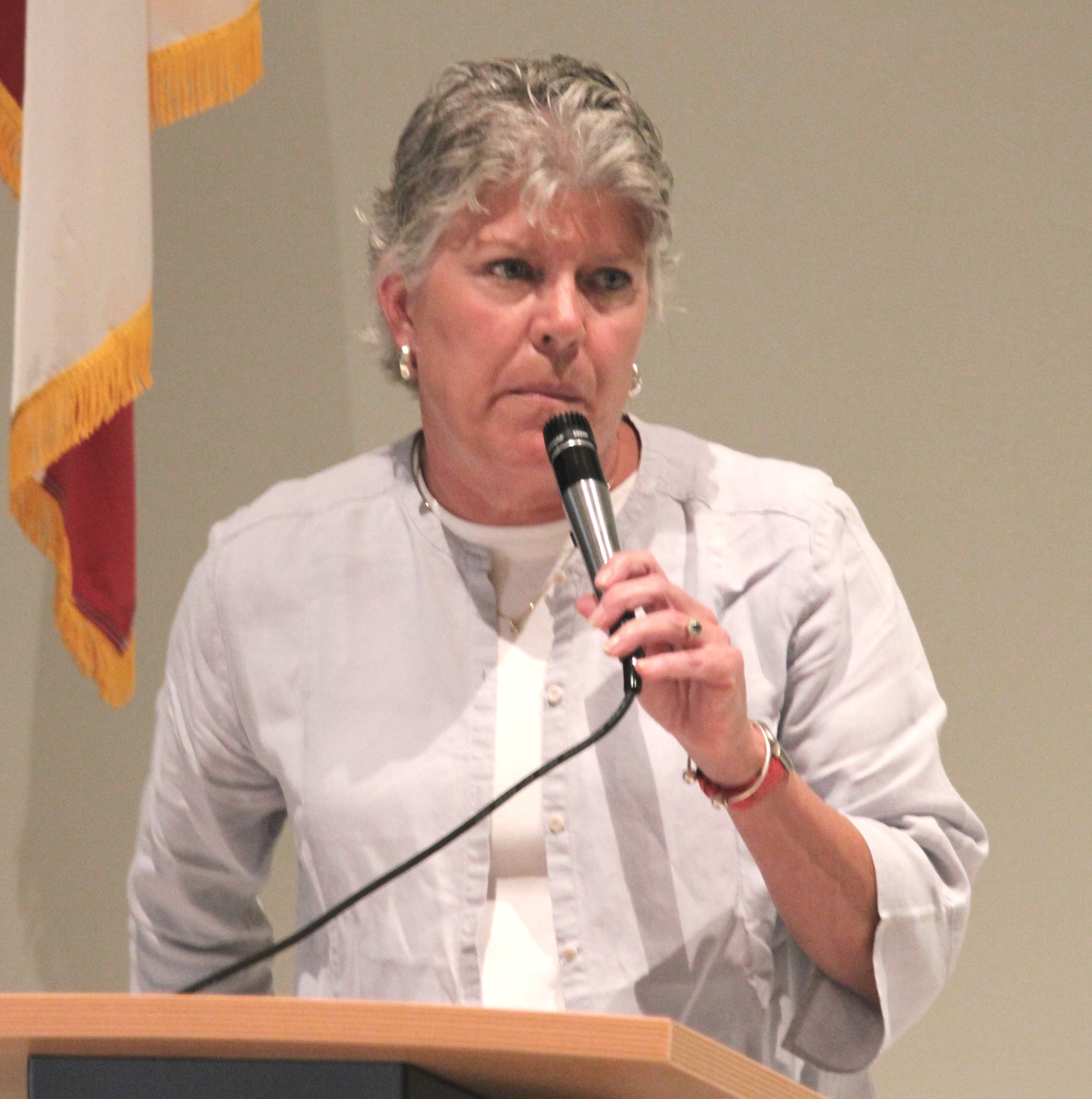
Brownley during her tenure in the California State Assembly

=== Elections ===
In 2006, Brownley ran for the California State Assembly in California's 41st Assembly district which included Santa Monica. She won a five-way Democratic primary with 35% of the vote and the general election with 62% of the vote. In 2008, she was reelected with 66% of the vote. In 2010, she was reelected to a third term with 59% of the vote. Brownley was term-limited in 2012, having served the maximum of three terms in the Assembly permitted under California law.

She was endorsed by the League of Conservation Voters.

=== Tenure ===
In 2010, Brownley authored a bill that would have banned all plastic shopping bags. It did not pass.

=== Committee assignments ===
Brownley served on the following California State Assembly committees:

- Aging and Long-Term Care Committee
- Education Committee (chair)
- Higher Education Committee
- Judiciary Committee
- Legislative Budget Committee
- Natural Resources Joint Legislative Budget Committee
- Select Committee on Community Colleges

== U.S. House of Representatives (2013–present) ==
=== Elections ===
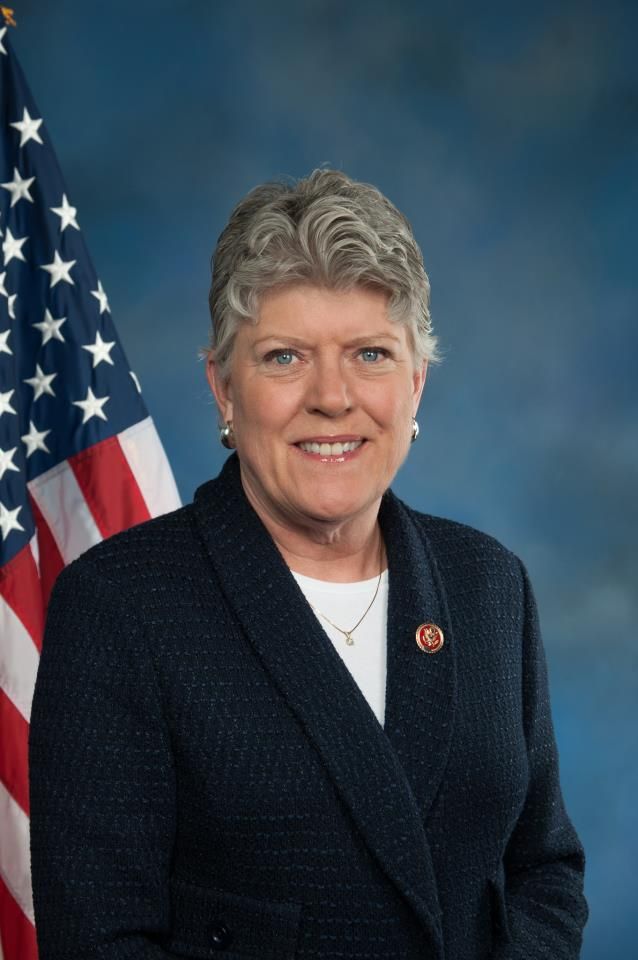
Brownley's freshman portrait

==== 2012 ====
In February 2012, Brownley announced her candidacy for California's 26th congressional district. The district had previously been the 24th district, represented by 13-term Republican Elton Gallegly. In the general election, Brownley defeated Republican state senator Tony Strickland, 53%–47%. She was endorsed by Emily's List and Planned Parenthood.

==== 2014 ====
Brownley was narrowly reelected over Republican state assemblyman Jeff Gorell in the general election. She is a member of the Democratic Congressional Campaign Committee's Frontline Program, which is designed to help protect vulnerable Democratic incumbents. After Republican candidates garnered over 50% of the vote in the June blanket primary, the Cook Political Report changed the rating of the race from "Leans Democratic" to "Toss-up". The race did become close, making for closer scrutiny of the results. Initial results showed Brownley winning 51% to 49%, with about 4,000 votes separating the candidates.

==== 2026 ====
On January 8, 2026, Brownley announced she would not seek reelection and would retire from the House of Representatives in 2027. She did not cite a reason for her retirement, but said "Serving our community and our country has been the honor of my lifetime. Every step of this journey has been shaped by the people I represent, by their resilience, their determination, and their belief that government can and should work for the common good," in a statement to the Los Angeles Times.

=== Political positions ===
Brownley supports the DREAM Act, the Affordable Care Act, and same-sex marriage. She has advocated increased insurance company regulation, job training funds, toxic cleanup, and increased public education funding. Since her election to Congress, Brownley has voted with the Democratic Party 93% of the time. On November 19, 2015, she voted for HR 4038, American SAFE Act of 2015, legislation that would effectively halt the resettlement of refugees from Syria and Iraq to the United States.

On November 10, 2026, Brownley missed the House vote on the impeachment of Pete Hegseth as Secretary of Defense. Brownley claimed that the voting window closed early before she had a chance to vote, though the vote was scheduled for 15 minutes and lasted 27 minutes.

=== Committee assignments ===
For the 119th Congress:

- Committee on Natural Resources
  - Subcommittee on Water, Wildlife and Fisheries
- Committee on Transportation and Infrastructure
  - Subcommittee on Aviation
  - Subcommittee on Highways and Transit
  - Subcommittee on Water Resources and Environment
- Committee on Veterans' Affairs
  - Subcommittee on Health (Ranking Member)

=== Caucus memberships ===
- Black Maternal Health Caucus
- Blue Collar Caucus
- California Public Higher Education Caucus
- Compost Caucus (Co-Chair and Co-Founder)
- Congressional Arts Caucus
- Congressional California Coastal Caucus (Co-Chair)
- Congressional Caucus on Global Migration
- Congressional Caucus on India and Indian-Americans
- Congressional Caucus to End the Youth Vaping Epidemic
- Congressional Coalition on Adoption
- Congressional Community Health Centers Caucus
- Congressional Dyslexia Caucus (Co-Chair)
- Congressional Equality Caucus
- Congressional Food Safety Caucus
- Congressional Freethought Caucus
- Congressional Solar Caucus
- Congressional Ukraine Caucus
- House Baltic Caucus
- New Democrat Coalition
- Rare Disease Caucus
- Reproductive Freedom Caucus
  - VA, Servicemembers, & Veterans Task Force Chair

== Political positions ==
=== Abortion ===
Brownley strongly opposed the 2022 overturning of Roe v. Wade, calling the decision "unprecedented, deeply disappointing, and ideologically driven".

=== Food and agriculture ===
Brownley supports federal funding for alternative proteins, including plant-based and cultivated meat. In 2021, Brownley and Representative Jim McGovern led a letter by 46 members of Congress requesting $200 million for alternative proteins research in an upcoming budget reconciliation package. In 2023, Brownley authored the Producing Real Opportunities for Technology and Entrepreneurs Investing in Nutrition (PROTEIN) Act, which would have established alternative protein job training programs and research centers at universities and the Department of Agriculture.

In March 2024, Brownley joined a letter to President Biden encouraging the administration to follow through with a proposal to increase plant-based food offerings across federal facilities. In August 2024, she led a letter alongside Representative Adam Schiff urging the Federal Bureau of Prisons to increase plant-based meal options for federal prisoners.

=== Israel–Palestine ===
Brownley voted to provide Israel with support following the October 7 attacks. Brownley has stated her support for Israel and Israeli sovereignty, as well as her belief in Israel's right to exist as a Jewish state. In 2026, Brownley voted in favor of an amendment to halt certain U.S. funds appropriated for Israeli military operations, citing a need for a "course correction" regarding the state of affairs within the Middle East region. Brownley found Prime Minister Benjamin Netanyahu's course of action to have "deeply undermined" the right to dignity and self-determination of the Palestinian people, as well as lacking in efforts towards the advancement of regional peace and security, having rather "recklessly escalated tensions" that "left both Israelis and Palestinians less safe."

== Electoral history ==
=== 2024 ===
United States House of Representatives elections, 2024
Primary election
Party	Candidate	Votes	%
Democratic	Julia Brownley (incumbent)	84,997	51.4
Republican	Michael Koslow	55,908	33.8
Republican	Bruce Boyer	17,707	10.7
Democratic	Chris Anstead	6,841	4.1
Total votes		165,453	100.0
General election
Democratic	Julia Brownley (incumbent)	187,393	56.1
Republican	Michael Koslow	146,913	43.9
Total votes		334,306	100.0
Democratic hold			

=== 2022 ===
United States House of Representatives elections, 2022
Party	Candidate	Votes	%
Democratic	Julia Brownley (incumbent)	134,575	54.5%
Republican	Matt Jacobs	112,214	45.5%
Total votes		246,789	100%
Democratic hold			

=== 2020 ===
United States House of Representatives elections, 2020
Party	Candidate	Votes	%
Democratic	Julia Brownley (incumbent)	208,856	60.6%
Republican	Ronda Baldwin-Kennedy	135,877	39.4%
Total votes		344,733	100%
Democratic hold			

=== 2018 ===
United States House of Representatives elections, 2018
Party	Candidate	Votes	%
Democratic	Julia Brownley (incumbent)	110,804	61.9%
Republican	Antonio Sabàto Jr.	73,416	38.1%
Total votes		184,220	100%
Democratic hold			

=== 2016 ===
United States House of Representatives elections, 2016
Party	Candidate	Votes	%
Democratic	Julia Brownley (incumbent)	169,248	60.4%
Republican	Rafael A. Dagnesses	111,059	39.6%
Total votes		280,307	100%
Democratic hold			

=== 2014 ===
California's 26th congressional district election, 2014
Primary election
Party	Candidate	Votes	%
Democratic	Julia Brownley (incumbent)	38,854	45.5%
Republican	Jeff Gorell	38,021	44.5%
Republican	Rafael Alberto Dagnesses	6,536	7.7%
No party preference	Douglas Kmiec	1,980	2.3%
Total votes		85,391	100%
General election
Democratic	Julia Brownley (incumbent)	87,176	51.3%
Republican	Jeff Gorell	82,653	48.7%
Total votes		169,829	100%
Democratic hold			

=== 2012 ===
California's 26th congressional district election, 2012
Primary election
Party	Candidate	Votes	%
Republican	Tony Strickland	49,043	44.1%
Democratic	Julia Brownley	29,892	26.9%
No party preference	Linda Parks	20,301	18.3%
Democratic	Jess Herrera	7,244	6.5%
Democratic	David Cruz Thayne	2,809	2.5%
Democratic	Alex Maxwell Goldberg	1,880	1.7%
Total votes		111,169	100%
General election
Democratic	Julia Brownley	139,072	52.7%
Republican	Tony Strickland	124,863	47.3%
Total votes		263,935	100%
Democratic gain from Republican			

== Personal life ==
Brownley is divorced and has two children. She is an Episcopalian.

== See also ==
- Women in the United States House of Representatives

U.S. House of Representatives
Preceded by David Dreier	Member of the U.S. House of Representatives from California's 26th congressional district 2013–present	Incumbent
U.S. order of precedence (ceremonial)
Preceded by Ami Bera	United States representatives by seniority 101st	Succeeded by Joaquin Castro
