= Jeff Gorell =

American politician (born 1970)

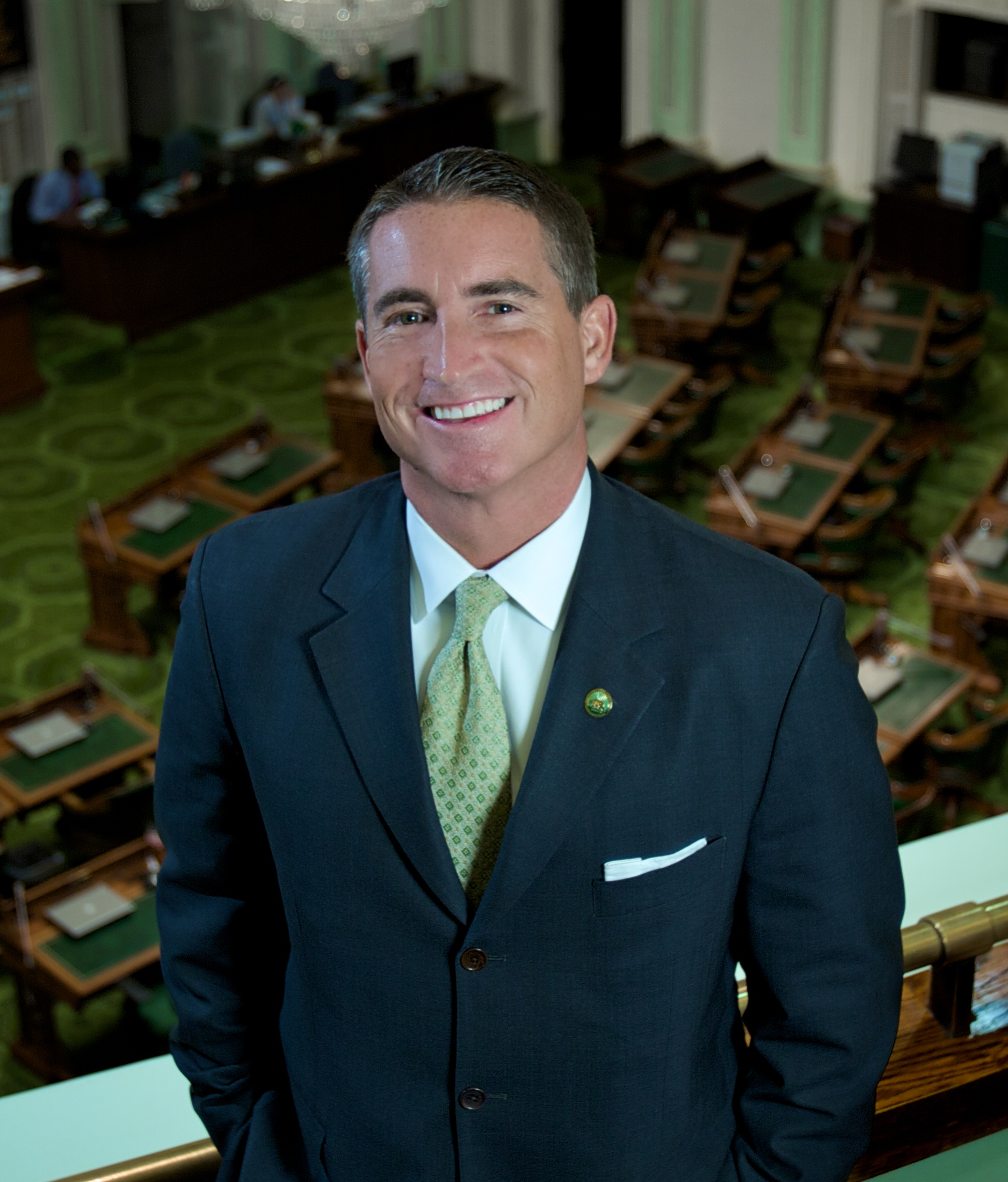

Chair of Ventura County
- Incumbent
- Assumed office January 13, 2026
- Preceded by: Janice S. Parvin

Vice Chair of Ventura County
- In office January 14, 2025 – January 13, 2026
- Preceded by: Janice S. Parvin
- Succeeded by: Vianey Lopez

Member of the Ventura County Board of Supervisors from District 2
- Incumbent
- Assumed office January 10, 2023
- Preceded by: Linda Parks

Member of the California State Assembly from the 44th district
- In office December 6, 2010 – December 1, 2014
- Preceded by: Audra Strickland
- Succeeded by: Jacqui Irwin

Personal details
- Born: Jeffrey Frederick Gorell; November 6, 1970 (age 56) Alexandria, Virginia
- Party: Republican
- Spouse: Angelina Gorell (married June 2025) Laura Klassen (div. 2018)
- Children: Jack; Steven
- Education: University of California, Davis
- Profession: Attorney; Business Owner; University Professor
- Awards: Defense Meritorious Service Medal; Navy Commendation Medal; Navy Expeditionary Medal

Military service
- Allegiance: United States of America
- Branch/service: United States Navy
- Years of service: 1999-present
- Rank: Navy Captain
- Unit: United States Indo-Pacific Command
- Battles/wars: War in Afghanistan

Jeffrey Frederick Gorell (born November 6, 1970), an American politician who has served as a member of the Ventura County Board of Supervisors, 2nd District, since 2022. He was elected to the California State Legislature to serve as Assembly Member for the 37th Assembly District in California, representing most of Ventura County. After the decennial redistricting in 2011, he was re-elected to represent the new 44th Assembly District and served as Vice-Chairman of the Assembly Budget Committee. In 2014, he was a candidate for the U.S. House of Representatives in California's 26th congressional district. He served as the Deputy Mayor of the City of Los Angeles for Homeland Security and Public Safety. He is notable for being the first California legislator called to active duty since World War II. During his deployment, fourteen bills were sponsored in his name.

== Early life and education ==
Gorell earned his Bachelor of Arts degree in history from the University of California, Davis in 1992. He obtained his Juris Doctor from the University of the Pacific's McGeorge School of Law in 1998, and earned a certificate in international legal studies at University of Salzburg studying under Associate Justice of the U.S. Supreme Court Anthony Kennedy. Gorell is the grandson of a Seabee who served in Guam during World War II and the son of a career naval officer and Vietnam veteran.

== Career ==
Before his election to the California State Assembly, Gorell was a regional public affairs firm co-owner, Paladin Principle LLC, based in Ventura County. He advised clients and served as the company's legal counsel. He was also a member of the California Lutheran University faculty, teaching undergraduate and graduate-level politics and public policy as an adjunct professor.

From 1993 to 1996, Gorell served as an advisor, writer, and deputy press secretary to former California Governor Pete Wilson, working to develop the administration's message on such state policy changes as "Three Strikes," state welfare reform, manufacturers' investment tax credits, "Megan's Law," and class size reduction. Gorell left the Wilson Administration to serve as a spokesperson for various California businesses, including as Director of Communications for the California Manufacturers and Technology Association (CMTA) from 1996 to 1999. He advocated before the legislature and Capitol press corps for pro-business legislation in the areas of taxes, regulations, workers compensation, tort reform, and trade law.

=== Deputy District Attorney (1999-2006) ===
As a Deputy District Attorney for the County of Ventura from 1999–2006, Gorell gained experience in preventing youth violence. He served as a trial prosecutor in the major narcotics, violent felony units, and juvenile crime units.

=== California Assembly (2010-2014) ===
Gorell defeated Robert Howell in the June 8, 2010, primary election, earning 89% of the vote. He then defeated Democrat Ferial Masry in the November 2 general election. He was the only Republican running for Assembly in 2010 to receive an endorsement from the California Federation of Labor, one of the state's prominent labor unions. He also received the endorsement of the Chamber of Commerce. On October 9, 2010, Gorell was endorsed by the Ventura County Star newspaper. Gorell is considered a moderate Republican.

Just before the November 2 general election, Gorell announced that he was being mobilized for duty by the United States Navy Reserve and deployed to Afghanistan on March 18, 2011. He noted that he would still be able to sponsor legislation and would not be drawing an assembly salary while serving overseas. Once elected, he became the first California legislator called to active duty since World War II. The Camarillo Acorn reports that "Fourteen bills were introduced in Gorell's name while he was away, and six of those bills were co-authored by Democrats."

In the state's first primary election under the new top-two open primary on June 5, 2012, Gorell received 58.1% of the vote, beating Eileen MacEnery, who received 23.3% of the vote, and Thomas Mullens, who received 18.6% of the vote. In the November 6, 2012, general election, Gorell went on to defeat MacEnery after receiving 52.9% of the vote.

==== Legislation ====
In early 2014, he introduced paperwork to begin a ballot measure that would end the high-speed rail development in California, arguing that "California cannot afford to pay for a high-speed train system that will cost more than $100 billion at a time when prisoners are being released from prisons and taxpayers are being asked to dig deeper into their own pockets to pay for basic service." He served on several committees. In 2014, Gorell introduced the Drone Privacy Protection Bill, which would ban warrant-less spying by police drones in many cases. The bill passed both houses of the California legislature, but was vetoed by Governor Jerry Brown.

=== 2014 congressional election ===
In November 2013, Gorell announced he would challenge Democratic U.S. Congresswoman Julia Brownley for California's 26th congressional district, based in Ventura County. He and Brownley advanced past the June 3 blanket primary and faced each other in the general election. The Cook Political Report rated the race a "Toss-up."

According to Stuart Rothenberg of Roll Call, Gorell is a "self-described moderate Republican": pro-choice, believes the Defense of Marriage Act was unconstitutional, and supports immigration reform, including paths to citizenship for those already here. He was endorsed by former State Senator Tony Strickland.

In the November 4 election, he lost to Brownley by a narrow margin.

=== Ventura County Board of Supervisors ===
He was elected to the Ventura County Board of Supervisors, District 2, in 2022, succeeding Linda Parks. In January 2026 he was elected Chair.

== Military service ==
A third-generation member of the U.S. Navy, Gorell serves as a Navy Captain in the United States Navy Reserve. Within days of the September 11 attacks in 2001, he was recalled to active duty to support Operation Enduring Freedom. He spent a one-year deployment in the Persian Gulf and Afghanistan. He was decorated for leadership and meritorious actions in a combat zone. He led multiple combat cameramen teams into the mountains of Afghanistan to embed with small Special Forces teams.

Gorell was mobilized for his second tour in support of Operation Enduring Freedom in Afghanistan in March 2011. He was embedded with U.S. Marines as an intelligence officer at Camp Leatherneck in Helmand, Afghanistan. He returned home and to his work in the California State Legislature in March 2012. In 2023, he was selected to command NR United States Indo-Pacific Command Joint Intelligence Operations Center Headquarters, Pearl Harbor, HI, a joint unit of 150 reserve personnel.

== Personal life ==
Gorell resides in Thousand Oaks, California, is married to Angelina Gorell, and has two sons from a previous marriage, Jack and Steven. In 2019, Fox Network put in development City Hall, an hour-long Los Angeles-set drama from writer Bruce Romans (Deputy, The Punisher), The Nacelle Company, and Fox Entertainment-owned SideCar Content Accelerator. Gorell will serve as an executive producer.
