= Linda Park (disambiguation) =

Linda Park (born 1978) is a South Korean-born American actress.

Linda Park may also refer to:

- Linda Park (comics), fictional character in the DC Comics universe
- Linda Sue Park (born 1960), American author of teen fiction

== See also ==
- Linda Parks (born 1957), American politician in California
