= Tony Strickland =

American politician (born 1970)

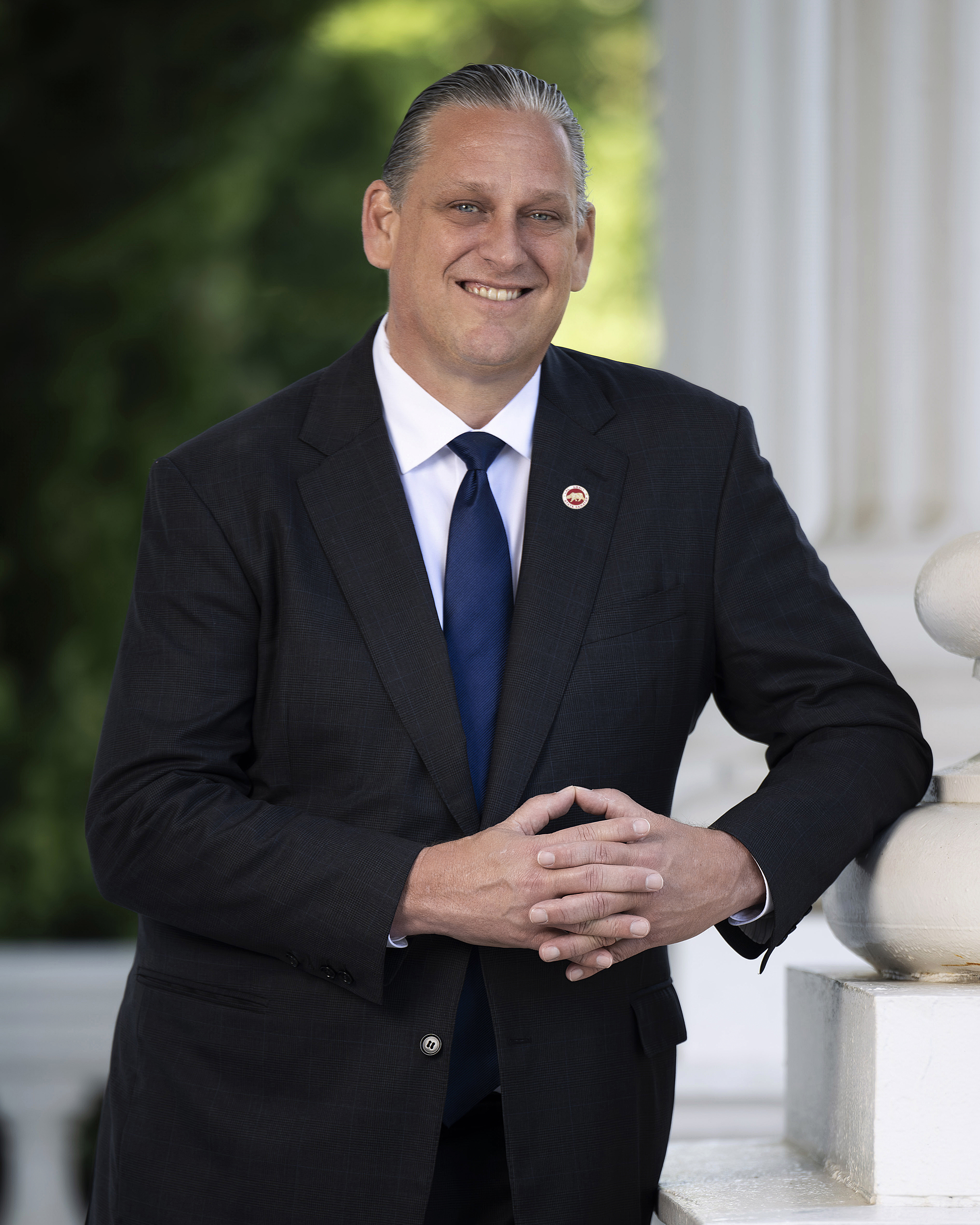
- Official portrait, 2025

Member of the California State Senate
- Incumbent
- Assumed office March 11, 2025
- Preceded by: Janet Nguyen
- Succeeded by: Chris Duncan (elect)
- Constituency: 36th district
- In office December 1, 2008 – December 3, 2012
- Preceded by: Tom McClintock
- Succeeded by: Hannah-Beth Jackson
- Constituency: 19th district

66th mayor of Huntington Beach
- In office December 6, 2022 – December 6, 2023
- Preceded by: Barbara Delgleize
- Succeeded by: Gracey Van Der Mark

Member of the Huntington Beach City Council for the at-large district
- In office December 6, 2022 – March 10, 2025
- Preceded by: Kim Carr
- Succeeded by: Andrew Gruel

Member of the California State Assembly from the 37th district
- In office December 7, 1998 – November 30, 2004
- Preceded by: Nao Takasugi
- Succeeded by: Audra Strickland

Personal details
- Born: February 17, 1970 (age 56) Fort Ord, California, U.S.
- Party: Republican
- Spouses: Audra Strickland (m. 1998; div. 2015) Carla Dispalatro Strickland (m. 2019)
- Children: 2
- Education: Whittier College (BA)

Anthony A. Strickland (born February 17, 1970) is an American politician who is a California state senator representing the 36th district since 2025. A member of the Republican Party, he previously represented the 19th district from 2008 to 2012.

He was a member of the Huntington Beach City Council from 2022 to 2025 and was Mayor of Huntington Beach from 2022 to 2023. During his tenure as mayor, he was involved in conflicts with the state of California due to his opposition to new housing.

He was also a state assemblyman representing the 37th district from 1998 to 2004. He owns a political and business consulting firm. He is the president and CEO of Strong America, an advocacy group and super PAC.

== Early life, education, and early political career ==
Strickland was born at Fort Ord, California, when his father was stationed there as a soldier in the United States Army. Don Strickland met his wife, Antonie, when he was stationed in Germany. The family moved to Ventura County in 1973. Strickland earned his Bachelor of Arts in political science at Whittier College, where he earned the Leadership and Service Award and was a Nixon Scholar.

From 1996 to 1997, Strickland served on the staff of Assemblyman Tom McClintock.

== Political career ==
=== California Assembly ===
Strickland was first elected to the Assembly in 1998 with 49% of the vote in a three-way race.

In 1998, Strickland distributed flyers in his campaign claiming Camarillo mayor Charlotte Craven endorsed him. Strickland was not endorsed by Craven and the mayor requested that Strickland remove her name from the flyer. With Craven's name removed, only one elected official, Mike Markey, had endorsed Strickland.

In 1998, the Strickland campaign had a complaint filed against it alleging that a mailer sent out by an independent group attacking Strickland's opponent coordinated with the campaign. The complaint was made by the president of the West Valley Republican Club, Michael Chulak. He claimed that the mailer was illegal because it was sent out "at the behest" of the Strickland campaign. The mailer was sent out by a Sacramento-based gun owner's group on Strickland's behalf.

He was re-elected in 2000 with 51% of the vote, again in a three-way race. He was re-elected to a third term with 63.1% of the vote in 2002. Term limits prevented Strickland from seeking a fourth term in 2004. Audra Strickland, his then-wife, decided to run for the seat and won (she was re-elected in 2006 and 2008).

=== 2006 run for state controller ===
In 2006 Strickland ran for state controller. He won 41% of the vote in a four-way primary, besting state senator Abel Maldonado, his nearest opponent, who received 37.0% of the vote. Strickland was defeated by John Chiang in the general election by a 50.7%-40.2% margin.

=== California Senate ===
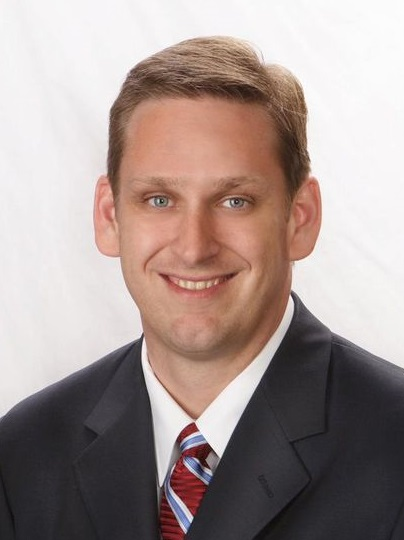
Strickland while serving as a California State Senator in 2014.

Strickland ran in California's 19th district against the Democratic nominee, former state assemblywoman Hannah-Beth Jackson. Senate District 19 includes areas of Santa Barbara, Ventura, and Los Angeles counties. The race was highly competitive and the closest state Senate race in California that year.

The race was also contentious, with critics of Strickland upset at the alleged misrepresentations of his business background. On various campaign literature, the Strickland campaign portrayed Strickland as a vice president of Green Wave Energy Solutions, LLC—even though Strickland has worked in politics his entire adult life, and Green Wave Energy Solutions LLC has not done any business in California.

Jackson conceded just five days before Strickland was sworn into the Senate. He had won the election by 900 votes. With Strickland's 2008 election to the State Senate and his wife, Audra, simultaneously winning re-election to the State Assembly, the Stricklands became the second husband and wife to serve concurrently in the California State Legislature (after Senator George Runner and Assemblywoman Sharon Runner).

=== 2010 state controller election ===
In the June 2010 primary, Strickland won 60% of the vote to gain the Republican nomination for state controller, setting up a rematch of the 2006 controller election between Strickland and Chiang, who was unopposed in his bid for the Democratic nomination for re-election as state controller. In the general election, Strickland lost again to Chiang, this time by a wider margin: Chiang received 55% of the vote, while Strickland received 36%.

=== 2012 congressional election ===
In January 2012, Strickland announced his candidacy in the newly redrawn California's 26th congressional district, based in Ventura County. Strickland was defeated by Democrat Julia Brownley on November 6, 2012.

=== 2014 congressional election ===
Congressman Howard "Buck" McKeon, who represented California's 25th congressional district since 1993, retired and endorsed Strickland. He was also endorsed by former Republican candidate for president, Mitt Romney, and vice presidential candidate Paul Ryan. He ran against then California state senator Steve Knight on November 4, 2014, and was defeated. California's 25th congressional district covers northern parts of Los Angeles County and parts of Ventura County. It includes the cities of Santa Clarita, Simi Valley, Palmdale, and Lancaster, and the northern part of the San Fernando Valley.

=== Campaign finance penalties ===
In December 1999, the California secretary of state sued Strickland for failing to report $116,140 in late contributions, in violation of the California Political Reform Act of 1974. He was fined $6,000.

In April 2010, the California Fair Political Practices Commission (FPPC) decided that Strickland and Strickland for State Senate, a member of the California State Senate, and his candidate-controlled committee sent out a mass mailing without the name of the committee on the outside of the mailing. The commission levied a $3,000 fine.

In May 2016, Strickland agreed to pay a $40,000 fine to settle a FPPC investigation that determined that he laundered campaign donations during his 2010 run for state controller. The commission found that Strickland had routed campaign contributions through the Ventura County Republican Party and Stanislaus County Republican Central Committee, in an effort to evade state limits on campaign contributions. The Commission said that Strickland did not cooperate with the investigation. Strickland accepted responsibility for eight violations, but said that he did not personally solicit the donations to the party organizations.

=== Trump support ===
During the 2016 Republican Party presidential primaries, Strickland supported Donald Trump, and he was a Trump delegate at the 2016 Republican National Convention. In May 2016, Strickland was also named the California chairman of the "Committee for American Sovereignty," a pro-Trump super PAC.

=== Huntington Beach city council ===
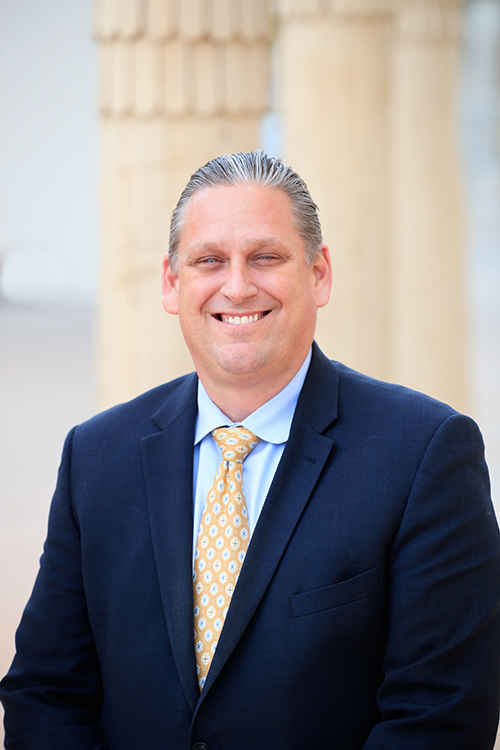
Strickland during his tenure as mayor of Huntington Beach in 2022.

Strickland was elected to the Huntington Beach city council in November 2022. Strickland and three other conservative candidates (Grace Van Der Mark, Casey McKeon and Pat Burns) campaigned as a slate, and all four won election to the council, forming a new conservative majority.

==== Term as mayor ====
Strickland spent a one-year term as mayor of Huntington Beach. He was sworn in on December 7, 2022. In its December 2022 vote, the new conservative-majority council chose Strickland as mayor on a 4–3 vote, with Van Der Mark being elected mayor pro tempore on a 4–3 vote. On December 6, 2023, on a 4–3 vote, Strickland was succeeded by Van Der Mark, and the pro tem position went to Burns. In both 2022 and 2023, the council voted 4–3 to set aside previous council resolutions under which the pro tem post was granted to the longest-serving councilmember who had not served as mayor in the past four years. During the 2023 vote, Strickland made the motion to set aside this previous custom of selecting the pro tem based on seniority.

Strickland remains a member of the city council.

==== Housing issues ====
As a city councilmember and as mayor, Strickland staunchly opposed increasing housing supply. During his tenure, the city stopped accepting applications for accessory dwelling units, which prompted California attorney general Rob Bonta to sue the city, alleging that the city was violating the California HOME Act (SB 9), a state law requiring municipalities to allow greater housing supply. The city also sued the state of California, alleging that the state's Regional Housing Needs Assessment infringed on the city's authority; a federal judge denied the city's request for a temporary restraining order blocking the application of state housing law. Bonta said that Huntington Beach's suit was a "baseless and obstructionist attempt by the city to defy state housing laws."

Strickland says that he supports affordable housing but Huntington Beach is "95% built out" and he will not support "anything that guts our suburban coastal community." In 2023, he claimed that "high rise high density urbanization" was being "forced" on the city.

In 2024, Strickland supported a ballot initiative to allow California cities to impose rent control on new apartments. Strickland said he did not support rent control as a policy, but would support the initiative because it would enable local governments to impose steep requirements on new housing which would block new housing construction.

== Career as political consultant ==
In October 2015, Strickland announced the formation of Strong America, a super PAC of which he is president and CEO.

== Personal life ==
Strickland has one daughter and one son with his first wife, Audra Strickland, whom he married in 1998. The couple divorced in 2015. He married his second wife, Carla Dispalatro Strickland, on February 17, 2019.

=== Properties ===
Strickland and his wife live in a four-bedroom 1,800 square-feet condominium on the west side of Huntington Beach that she purchased for $319,000 in 2000. The unit is publicly listed as a state mandated affordable housing unit. Given that Strickland lives in affordable housing, his staunch opposition to affordable housing mandates prompted accusations of hypocrisy.

Strickland also owns a home in Moorpark in Ventura County.

== Electoral history ==
Tony Strickland electoral history

2000 California State Assembly 37th district election
Primary election
Party	Candidate	Votes	%
Republican	Tony Strickland (incumbent)	50,966	100.0
Total votes		50,966	100.0
General election
Republican	Tony Strickland (incumbent)	71,572	51.3
Democratic	Roz McGrath	64,691	46.4
Libertarian	Willard Michlin	3,306	2.3
Total votes		139,569	100.0
Republican hold			

2002 California State Assembly 37th district election
Primary election
Party	Candidate	Votes	%
Republican	Tony Strickland (incumbent)	37,437	88.6
Republican	James F. Duzick	4,833	11.4
Total votes		42,270	100.0
General election
Republican	Tony Strickland (incumbent)	74,876	63.1
Democratic	Bruce J. Thomas	43,806	36.9
Total votes		118,682	100.0
Republican hold			

2006 California State Controller election
Primary election
Party	Candidate	Votes	%
Republican	Tony Strickland	689,071	40.7
Republican	Abel Maldonado	626,559	37.0
Republican	Jim Stieringer	210,691	12.4
Republican	Bret Davis	91,760	5.4
Republican	David Harris	76,310	4.5
Total votes		1,694,391	100.0
General election
Democratic	John Chiang	4,232,313	50.7
Republican	Tony Strickland	3,360,611	40.2
Green	Laura Wells	260,047	3.2
Peace and Freedom	Elizabeth Cervantes Barron	212,383	2.5
Libertarian	Donna Tello	188,934	2.2
American Independent	Warren Campbell	106,761	1.2
Total votes		8,361,049	100.0
Democratic hold			

2008 California State Senate 19th district election
Primary election
Party	Candidate	Votes	%
Republican	Tony Strickland	62,037	100.0
Total votes		62,037	100.0
General election
Republican	Tony Strickland	207,976	50.2
Democratic	Hannah-Beth Jackson	207,119	49.8
Independent	Peter Winfield Diederich (write-in)	14	0.0
Total votes		415,109	100.0
Republican hold			

2010 California State Controller election
Primary election
Party	Candidate	Votes	%
Republican	Tony Strickland	1,221,033	60.1
Republican	David Evans	812,303	39.9
Total votes		2,033,336	100.0
General election
Democratic	John Chiang (incumbent)	5,325,357	55.2
Republican	Tony Strickland	3,487,014	36.1
Libertarian	Andrew Favor	292,441	3.1
Peace and Freedom	Karen Martinez	209,638	2.2
Green	Ross D. Frankel	191,282	1.9
American Independent	Lawrence G. Beliz	154,145	1.5
Total votes		9,659,877	100.0
Democratic hold			

2012 California's 26th congressional district election
Primary election
Party	Candidate	Votes	%
Republican	Tony Strickland	49,043	44.1
Democratic	Julia Brownley	29,892	26.9
No party preference	Linda Parks	20,301	18.3
Democratic	Jess Herrera	7,244	6.5
Democratic	David Cruz Thayne	2,809	2.5
Democratic	Alex Maxwell Goldberg	1,880	1.7
Total votes		111,169	100.0
General election
Democratic	Julia Brownley	139,072	52.7
Republican	Tony Strickland	124,863	47.3
Total votes		263,935	100.0
Democratic gain from Republican			

2014 California's 25th congressional district election
Primary election
Party	Candidate	Votes	%
Republican	Tony Strickland	19,090	29.6
Republican	Steve Knight	18,327	28.4
Democratic	Lee Rogers	14,315	22.2
Democratic	Evan "Ivan" Thomas	6,149	9.5
Republican	Troy Castagna	3,805	5.9
Libertarian	David Koster Bruce	1,214	1.9
No party preference	Michael Mussack	933	1.4
Republican	Navraj Singh	699	1.1
Total votes		64,532	100.0
General election
Republican	Steve Knight	60,847	53.3
Republican	Tony Strickland	53,225	46.7
Total votes		114,072	100.0
Republican hold			

2022 Huntington Beach City Council election
Party	Candidate	Votes	%
Nonpartisan	Pat Burns	37,266	13.6
Nonpartisan	Tony Strickland	36,805	13.4
Nonpartisan	Gracey Van Der Mark	33,833	12.3
Nonpartisan	Casey McKeon	33,455	12.2
Nonpartisan	Gina Clayton-Tarvin	21,630	7.9
Nonpartisan	Jill Hardy	20,788	7.6
Nonpartisan	Kenneth Inouye	20,029	7.3
Nonpartisan	Oscar D. Rodriguez	18,602	6.8
Nonpartisan	Brian Burley	12,555	4.6
Nonpartisan	William "Billy" O'Connell	7,903	2.9
Nonpartisan	David Clifford	6,614	2.4
Nonpartisan	Vera Fair	6,325	2.3
Nonpartisan	Mike Vogler	5,153	1.9
Nonpartisan	Bobby Britton	4,639	1.7
Nonpartisan	Gabrielle Samiy	4,052	1.5
Nonpartisan	Amory Hanson	1,792	0.7
Nonpartisan	Jeffrey Hansler	1,774	0.7
Nonpartisan	Robert V. Reider	978	0.4
Total votes		274,193	100.0

2025 California State Senate 36th district special election
Party	Candidate	Votes	%
Republican	Tony Strickland	81,133	51.3
Democratic	Jimmy D. Pham	43,730	27.7
Democratic	Julie Diep	22,647	14.3
Republican	John Briscoe	10,588	6.7
Total votes		158,098	100.0
Republican hold			

California Senate
Preceded by Janet Nguyen	California State Senator, 36th District; March 11, 2025 – present	Incumbent
Preceded by Tom McClintock	California State Senator, 19th district December 1, 2008 – November 30, 2012	Succeeded by Hannah-Beth Jackson
California Assembly
Preceded by Nao Takasugi	California State Assemblyman, 37th District; December 7, 1998 – November 30, 2004	Succeeded by Audra Strickland
