= Audra Strickland =

American politician

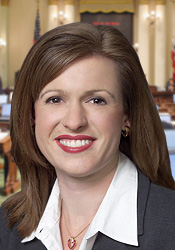

Member of the California State Assembly from the 37th district
- In office December 6, 2004 – December 6, 2010
- Preceded by: Tony Strickland
- Succeeded by: Jeff Gorell

Personal details
- Born: July 10, 1974 (age 52) Newport Beach, California
- Party: Republican
- Spouse: Tony Strickland (m. 1998; div. 2015)
- Children: 2
- Education: University of California, Irvine

Audra Strickland (born July 10, 1974) is an American politician who served as a member of the California State Assembly for the 37th district from December 6, 2004 to November 30, 2010. She succeeded her then-husband, Tony Strickland, who was term-limited. Before serving in the Assembly, she was a junior high school teacher for a year at Temple Christian School in Ventura, California.

== Education ==
While earning her Bachelor of Arts degree in political science, Strickland served as president of the Ronald Reagan Republican Club at the University of California, Irvine. She was a California State Assembly Fellow for Assemblyman Bill Campbell. Also, She worked for former Assembly Speaker Curt Pringle and Assemblyman Chuck Poochigian.

== Career ==
Audra Strickland filed to run for Secretary of State in 2010. Strickland ended her quest for Secretary of State and announced her intention to run for Ventura County Treasurer Tax Collector. The Ventura County Board of Supervisors adopted California Government Code 27000.7, which requires financial educational requirements for county tax treasurers. Strickland did not meet those requirements and had to drop out of the race.

In February 2010, Audra Strickland announced her intention to run for Ventura County Supervisor of the 2nd District, which consisted primarily of the city of Thousand Oaks, and included Oak Park and the Santa Rosa Valley. On June 8, 2010, Strickland failed in her bid, with County Supervisor Linda Parks re-elected by a large margin.

== Personal ==
Audra lives in Moorpark, California with her two children. Her former husband, Tony Strickland, became Mayor of Huntington Beach, California, in December 2022.
