= California's 26th congressional district =

U.S. House district for California

Coordinates: 34.2°N 117.8°W

- Interactive map of district boundaries
- Representative: Julia Brownley; D–Westlake Village
- Population (2025): 745,101
- Median household income: $121,459
- Ethnicity: 42.9% Hispanic; 42.4% White; 8.3% Asian; 3.8% Two or more races; 1.7% Black; 0.9% other
- Cook PVI: D+8

California 26th congressional district is a congressional district in the U.S. state of California currently represented by Democrat Julia Brownley.

The district is located on the South Coast, comprising most of Ventura County as well as a small portion of Los Angeles County. Cities in the district include Camarillo, Oxnard, Santa Paula, Thousand Oaks, Westlake Village, Moorpark, and part of Simi Valley. In 2022, the district lost Ojai and most of Ventura and added Calabasas, Agoura Hills, and the sparsely populated northern half of Ventura County.

From 2003 to 2013, the district spanned the foothills of the San Gabriel Valley from La Cañada Flintridge to Rancho Cucamonga. David Dreier, a Republican, represented the district during this period.

== Recent election results from statewide races ==
=== 2023–2027 boundaries ===
Year	Office	Results
2008	President	Obama 55% - 44%
2010	Governor	Whitman 51% - 44%
2010	Lt. Governor	Maldonado 45% - 43%
2010	Secretary of State	Dunn 47% - 45%
2010	Attorney General	Cooley 55% - 38%
2010	Treasurer	Lockyer 50% - 44%
2010	Controller	Strickland 47% - 45%
2012	President	Obama 53% - 47%
2014	Governor	Brown 52% - 48%
2016	President	Clinton 56% - 38%
2018	Governor	Newsom 55% - 45%
2018	Attorney General	Becerra 56% - 44%
2020	President	Biden 59% - 39%
2022	Senate (Reg.)	Padilla 55% - 45%
2022	Governor	Newsom 54% - 46%
2022	Lt. Governor	Kounalakis 54% - 46%
2022	Secretary of State	Weber 54% - 46%
2022	Attorney General	Bonta 53% - 47%
2022	Treasurer	Ma 53% - 47%
2022	Controller	Cohen 50.1% - 49.9%
2024	President	Harris 55% - 42%
2024	Senate (Reg.)	Schiff 54% - 46%

== Composition ==
FIPS County Code	County	Seat	Population
37	Los Angeles	Los Angeles	9,663,345
111	Ventura	Ventura	829,590

=== Cities and CDPs with 10,000 or more people ===
- Oxnard – 202,063
- Thousand Oaks – 126,966
- Simi Valley – 126,356
- Ventura – 110,763
- Camarillo – 70,741
- Moorpark – 36,284
- Santa Paula – 30,657
- Calabasas – 23,241
- Port Hueneme – 21,954
- Agoura Hills – 20,299
- Fillmore – 16,419
- Oak Park – 13,898

=== 2,500 – 10,000 people ===
- Westlake Village – 8,029
- El Rio – 7,037
- Casa Conejo – 3,627
- Santa Rosa Valley – 3,312
- Channel Islands Beach – 2,870
- Piru – 2,587

== List of members representing the district ==
Member	Party	Term	Cong ress(es)	Electoral history	Counties
District created January 3, 1953
Sam Yorty (Los Angeles)	Democratic	January 3, 1953 – January 3, 1955	83rd	Redistricted from the 14th district and re-elected in 1952. Retired to run for U.S. Senator.	Los Angeles
James Roosevelt (Los Angeles)	Democratic	January 3, 1955 – September 30, 1965	84th 85th 86th 87th 88th 89th	Elected in 1954. Re-elected in 1956. Re-elected in 1958. Re-elected in 1960. Re-elected in 1962. Re-elected in 1964. Resigned to become U.S. delegate to UNESCO.	Los Angeles
Vacant		September 30, 1965 – December 15, 1965	89th		Los Angeles
Thomas M. Rees (Los Angeles)	Democratic	December 15, 1965 – January 3, 1975	89th 90th 91st 92nd 93rd	Elected to finish Roosevelt's term. Re-elected in 1966. Re-elected in 1968; Re-elected in 1970. Re-elected in 1972. Redistricted to the 23rd district.	Los Angeles
John H. Rousselot (San Marino)	Republican	January 3, 1975 – January 3, 1983	94th 95th 96th 97th	Redistricted from the 24th district and re-elected in 1974. Re-elected in 1976. Re-elected in 1978. Re-elected in 1980. Redistricted to the 30th district and lost.	Los Angeles
Howard Berman (Los Angeles)	Democratic	January 3, 1983 – January 3, 1993	98th 99th 100th 101st 102nd	Re-elected in 1982. Re-elected in 1984. Re-elected in 1986. Re-elected in 1988. Re-elected in 1990. Re-elected in 1992. Re-elected in 1994. Re-elected in 1996. Re-elected in 1998. Re-elected in 2000. Redistricted to the 28th district.	Los Angeles (central San Fernando Valley)
Howard Berman (Los Angeles)	Democratic	January 3, 1993 – January 3, 2003	103rd 104th 105th 106th 107th	Re-elected in 1982. Re-elected in 1984. Re-elected in 1986. Re-elected in 1988. Re-elected in 1990. Re-elected in 1992. Re-elected in 1994. Re-elected in 1996. Re-elected in 1998. Re-elected in 2000. Redistricted to the 28th district.	Los Angeles (San Fernando)
David Dreier (San Dimas)	Republican	January 3, 2003 – January 3, 2013	108th 109th 110th 111th 112th	Redistricted from the 28th district and re-elected in 2002. Re-elected in 2004. Re-elected in 2006. Re-elected in 2008. Re-elected in 2010. Retired.	2003–2013 Los Angeles (eastern suburbs), San Bernardino (western suburbs)
Julia Brownley (Westlake Village)	Democratic	January 3, 2013 – present	113th 114th 115th 116th 117th 118th 119th	Elected in 2012. Re-elected in 2014. Re-elected in 2016. Re-elected in 2018. Re-elected in 2020. Re-elected in 2022. Re-elected in 2024. Retiring at the end of term.	2013–2023 Central Coast including Oxnard and Thousand Oaks
Julia Brownley (Westlake Village)	Democratic	January 3, 2013 – present	113th 114th 115th 116th 117th 118th 119th	Elected in 2012. Re-elected in 2014. Re-elected in 2016. Re-elected in 2018. Re-elected in 2020. Re-elected in 2022. Re-elected in 2024. Retiring at the end of term.	2023–2027
Jacqui Irwin (Thousand Oaks)	Democratic	Assuming office on January 3, 2027		Elected in 2026.	

== Election results ==
=== 1952 ===
1952 election
Party	Candidate	Votes	%
Democratic	Sam Yorty (incumbent)	157,973	88
Progressive	Horace V. Alexander	21,465	12
Total votes		179,438	100.0
Turnout			
Democratic hold			

=== 1954 ===
1954 election
Party	Candidate	Votes	%
Democratic	James Roosevelt	94,261	60.1
Republican	Theodore R. "Ted" Owings	62,585	39.9
Total votes		156,856	100.0
Turnout			
Democratic hold			

=== 1956 ===
United States House of Representatives elections, 1956
Party	Candidate	Votes	%
Democratic	James Roosevelt (incumbent)	133,036	68.8
Republican	Edward H. Gibbons	60,230	31.2
Total votes		193,266	100.0
Turnout			
Democratic hold			

=== 1958 ===
1958 election
Party	Candidate	Votes	%
Democratic	James Roosevelt (incumbent)	125,495	72.2
Republican	Crispus Wright	48,248	27.8
Total votes		173,743	100.0
Turnout			
Democratic hold			

=== 1960 ===
1960 election
Party	Candidate	Votes	%
Democratic	James Roosevelt (incumbent)	150,318	73.4
Republican	William E. McIntyre	54,540	26.6
Total votes		204,818	100.0
Turnout			
Democratic hold			

=== 1962 ===
1962 election
Party	Candidate	Votes	%
Democratic	James Roosevelt (incumbent)	112,162	68.3
Republican	Daniel Beltz	52,063	31.7
Total votes		164,225	100.0
Turnout			
Democratic hold			

=== 1964 ===
1964 election
Party	Candidate	Votes	%
Democratic	James Roosevelt (incumbent)	136,025	70.3
Republican	Gil Seton	57,209	29.7
Total votes		193,234	100.0
Turnout			
Democratic hold			

=== 1965 (Special) ===
1965 special election
Party	Candidate	Votes	%
Democratic	Thomas M. Rees		59.4
Republican	Edward M. Marshall		40.6
Total votes		{{{votes}}}	100.0
Turnout			
Democratic hold			

=== 1966 ===
1966 election
Party	Candidate	Votes	%
Democratic	Thomas M. Rees (incumbent)	103,289	62.3
Republican	Irving Teichner	62,441	37.7
Total votes		165,730	100.0
Turnout			
Democratic hold			

=== 1968 ===
1968 election
Party	Candidate	Votes	%
Democratic	Thomas M. Rees (incumbent)	132,447	65.5
Republican	Irving Teichner	63,393	31.3
Peace and Freedom	Jack Weinberg	6,394	3.2
Total votes		202,234	100.0
Turnout			
Democratic hold			

=== 1970 ===
1970 election
Party	Candidate	Votes	%
Democratic	Thomas M. Rees (incumbent)	130,499	71.3
Republican	Nathaniel Jay Friedman	47,260	25.8
Peace and Freedom	Lewis B. McCammon	3,677	2.0
American Independent	Howard E. Hallinan	1,639	0.9
Total votes		183,075	100.0
Turnout			
Democratic hold			

=== 1972 ===
1972 election
Party	Candidate	Votes	%
Democratic	Thomas M. Rees (incumbent)	160,932	68.6
Republican	Philip Robert Rutta	65,473	27.9
Peace and Freedom	Mike Timko	8,094	3.5
Total votes		234,499	100.0
Turnout			
Democratic hold			

=== 1974 ===
1974 election
Party	Candidate	Votes	%
Republican	John H. Rousselot (inc.)	80,782	58.9
Democratic	Paul A. Conforti	56,487	41.1
Total votes		137,269	100.0
Turnout			
Republican hold			

=== 1976 ===
1976 election
Party	Candidate	Votes	%
Republican	John H. Rousselot (inc.)	112,619	65.6
Democratic	Latta Bruce	59,093	34.4
Total votes		171,712	100.0
Turnout			
Republican hold			

=== 1978 ===
1978 election
Party	Candidate	Votes	%
Republican	John H. Rousselot (inc.)	113,059	100.0
Turnout			
Republican hold			

=== 1980 ===
1980 election
Party	Candidate	Votes	%
Republican	John H. Rousselot (inc.)	116,715	70.9
Democratic	Joseph Louis Lisoni	40,099	24.4
Libertarian	William "B. J." Wagener	7,700	4.7
Total votes		164,514	100.0
Turnout			
Republican hold			

=== 1982 ===
1982 election
Party	Candidate	Votes	%
Democratic	Howard Berman	97,383	59.6
Republican	Hal Phillips	66,072	40.4
Total votes		163,455	100.0
Turnout			
Democratic gain from Republican			

=== 1984 ===
1984 election
Party	Candidate	Votes	%
Democratic	Howard Berman (incumbent)	117,080	62.8
Republican	Miriam Ojeda	69,372	37.2
Total votes		186,452	100.0
Turnout			
Democratic hold			

=== 1986 ===
1986 election
Party	Candidate	Votes	%
Democratic	Howard Berman (incumbent)	98,091	65.1
Republican	Robert M. Kerns	52,662	34.9
Total votes		150,753	100.0
Turnout			
Democratic hold			

=== 1988 ===
1988 election
Party	Candidate	Votes	%
Democratic	Howard Berman (incumbent)	126,930	70.3
Republican	Gerald C. "Brodie" Broderson	53,518	29.7
Total votes		180,448	100.0
Turnout			
Democratic hold			

=== 1990 ===
1990 election
Party	Candidate	Votes	%
Democratic	Howard Berman (incumbent)	78,031	61.1
Republican	Roy Dahlson	44,492	34.8
Libertarian	Bernard Zimring	5,268	4.1
Total votes		127,791	100.0
Turnout			
Democratic hold			

=== 1992 ===
1992 election
Party	Candidate	Votes	%
Democratic	Howard Berman (incumbent)	73,807	61.0
Republican	Gary E. Forsch	36,453	30.2
Peace and Freedom	Margery Hinds	7,180	5.9
Libertarian	Bernard Zimring	3,468	2.9
Total votes		120,908	100.0
Turnout			
Democratic hold			

=== 1994 ===
1994 election
Party	Candidate	Votes	%
Democratic	Howard Berman (incumbent)	55,145	62.57
Republican	Gary E. Forsch	28,423	32.25
Libertarian	Erich D. Miller	4,570	5.19
Total votes		88,138	100.0
Turnout			
Democratic hold			

=== 1996 ===
1996 election
Party	Candidate	Votes	%
Democratic	Howard Berman (incumbent)	67,525	65.9
Republican	Bill Glass	29,332	28.7
Libertarian	Scott Fritschler	3,539	3.4
Natural Law	Gary Hearne	2,119	2.0
Total votes		195,545	100.0
Turnout			
Democratic hold			

=== 1998 ===
1998 election
Party	Candidate	Votes	%
Democratic	Howard Berman (incumbent)	69,000	82.47
Libertarian	Juan Carlos Ros	6,556	7.84
Green	Maria Armoudian	4,858	5.81
Natural Law	David L. Cossak	3,248	3.88
Total votes		83,662	100.0
Turnout			
Democratic hold			

=== 2000 ===
2000 election
Party	Candidate	Votes	%
Democratic	Howard Berman (incumbent)	96,500	84.1
Libertarian	Bill Farley	13,052	11.4
Natural Law	David L. Cossak	5,229	4.5
No party	Robert Edwards (write-in)	5	0.0
Total votes		114,786	100.0
Turnout			
Democratic hold			

=== 2002 ===
2002 election
Party	Candidate	Votes	%
Republican	David Dreier (incumbent)	95,360	63.8
Democratic	Marjorie Musser Mikels	50,081	33.5
Libertarian	Randall Weissbuch	4,089	2.7
Total votes		149,530	100.0
Turnout			
Republican hold			

=== 2004 ===
2004 election
Party	Candidate	Votes	%
Republican	David Dreier (incumbent)	134,596	51.6
Democratic	Cynthia Matthews	107,522	46.8
Libertarian	Randall Weissbuch	9,089	1.6
Total votes		251,207	100.0
Turnout			
Republican hold			

=== 2006 ===
2006 election
Party	Candidate	Votes	%
Republican	David Dreier (incumbent)	102,028	48.29%
Democratic	Cynthia Matthews	99,878	47.27%
Libertarian	Ted Brown	5,887	2.79%
American Independent	Elliott Graham	3,503	1.65%
Total votes		211,296	100.0
Turnout			
Republican hold			

=== 2008 ===
2008 election
Party	Candidate	Votes	%
Republican	David Dreier (incumbent)	140,615	52.7
Democratic	Russ Warner	108,039	40.4
Libertarian	Ted Brown	18,476	6.9
Total votes		267,130	100.0
Turnout			
Republican hold			

=== 2010 ===
2010 election
Party	Candidate	Votes	%
Republican	David Dreier (incumbent)	112,774	54.13
Democratic	Russ Warner	76,093	36.52
American Independent	David L. Miller	12,784	6.14
Libertarian	Randall Weissbuch	6,696	3.21
Total votes		208,347	100.00
Turnout			
Republican hold			

=== 2012 ===
2012 election
Primary election
Party	Candidate	Votes	%
Republican	Tony Strickland	49,043	44.1
Democratic	Julia Brownley	29,892	26.9
No party preference	Linda Parks	20,301	18.3
Democratic	Jess Herrera	7,244	6.5
Democratic	David Cruz Thayne	2,809	2.5
Democratic	Alex Maxwell Goldberg	1,880	1.7
Total votes		111,169	100.0
General election
Democratic	Julia Brownley	139,072	53%
Republican	Tony Strickland	124,863	47%
Total votes		263,935	100%
Democratic gain from Republican			

=== 2014 ===
2014 election
Party	Candidate	Votes	%
Democratic	Julia Brownley (incumbent)	87,176	51%
Republican	Jeff Gorell	82,653	49%
Total votes		169,829	100%
Democratic hold			

=== 2016 ===
2016 election
Party	Candidate	Votes	%
Democratic	Julia Brownley (incumbent)	169,248	60%
Republican	Rafael A. Dagnesses	111,059	40%
Total votes		280,307	100%
Democratic hold			

=== 2018 ===
2018 election
Party	Candidate	Votes	%
Democratic	Julia Brownley (incumbent)	110,804	60%
Republican	Antonio Sabato Jr.	73,416	39%
Total votes		184,220	100%
Democratic hold			

=== 2020 ===
2020 election
Party	Candidate	Votes	%
Democratic	Julia Brownley (incumbent)	208,856	60.6
Republican	Ronda Baldwin-Kennedy	135,877	39.4
Total votes		344,733	100.0

=== 2022 ===
2022 election
Party	Candidate	Votes	%
Democratic	Julia Brownley (incumbent)	134,575	54.5
Republican	Matt Jacobs	112,214	45.5
Total votes		246,789	100.0

=== 2024 ===
2024 election
Party	Candidate	Votes	%
Democratic	Julia Brownley (incumbent)	187,393	56.1
Republican	Michael Koslow	146,913	43.9
Total votes		334,306	100.0

== Historical district boundaries ==
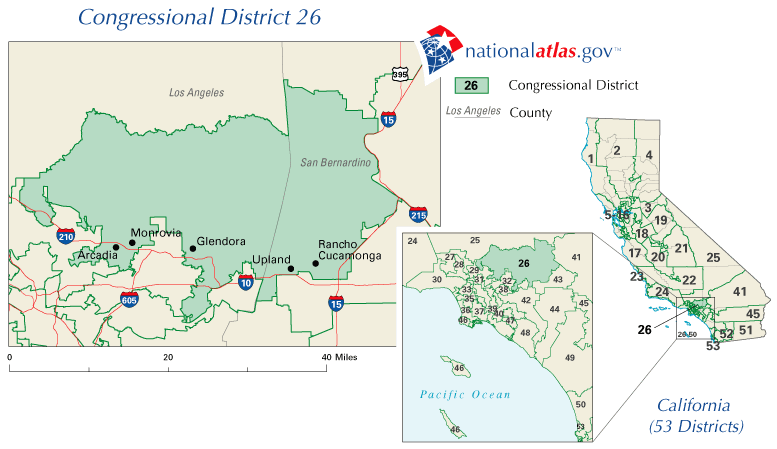
2003 - 2013

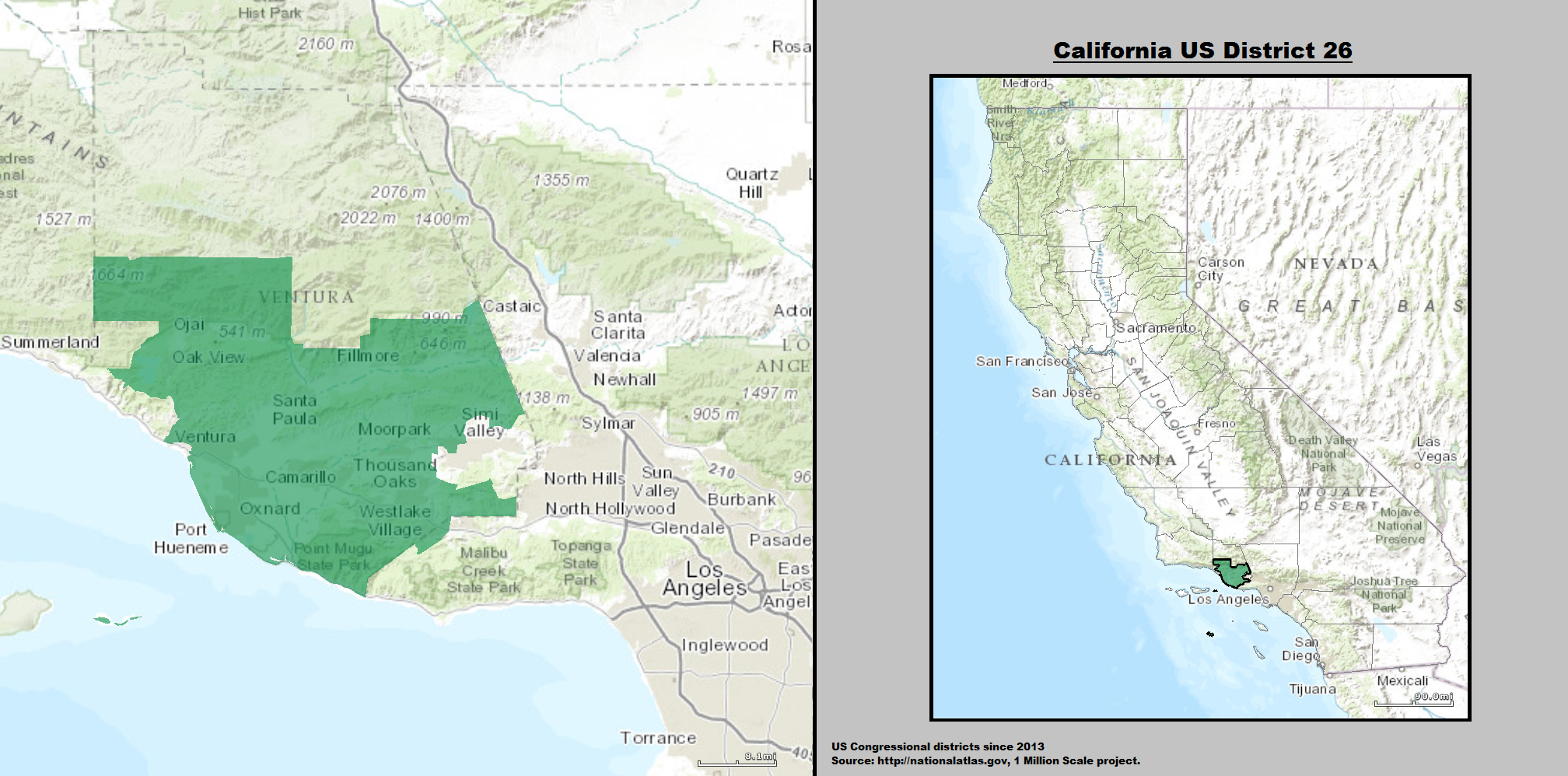
2013 - 2023

== See also ==
- List of United States congressional districts
- California's congressional districts
