= John Chiang (California politician) =

American politician (born 1962)

- 江俊輝
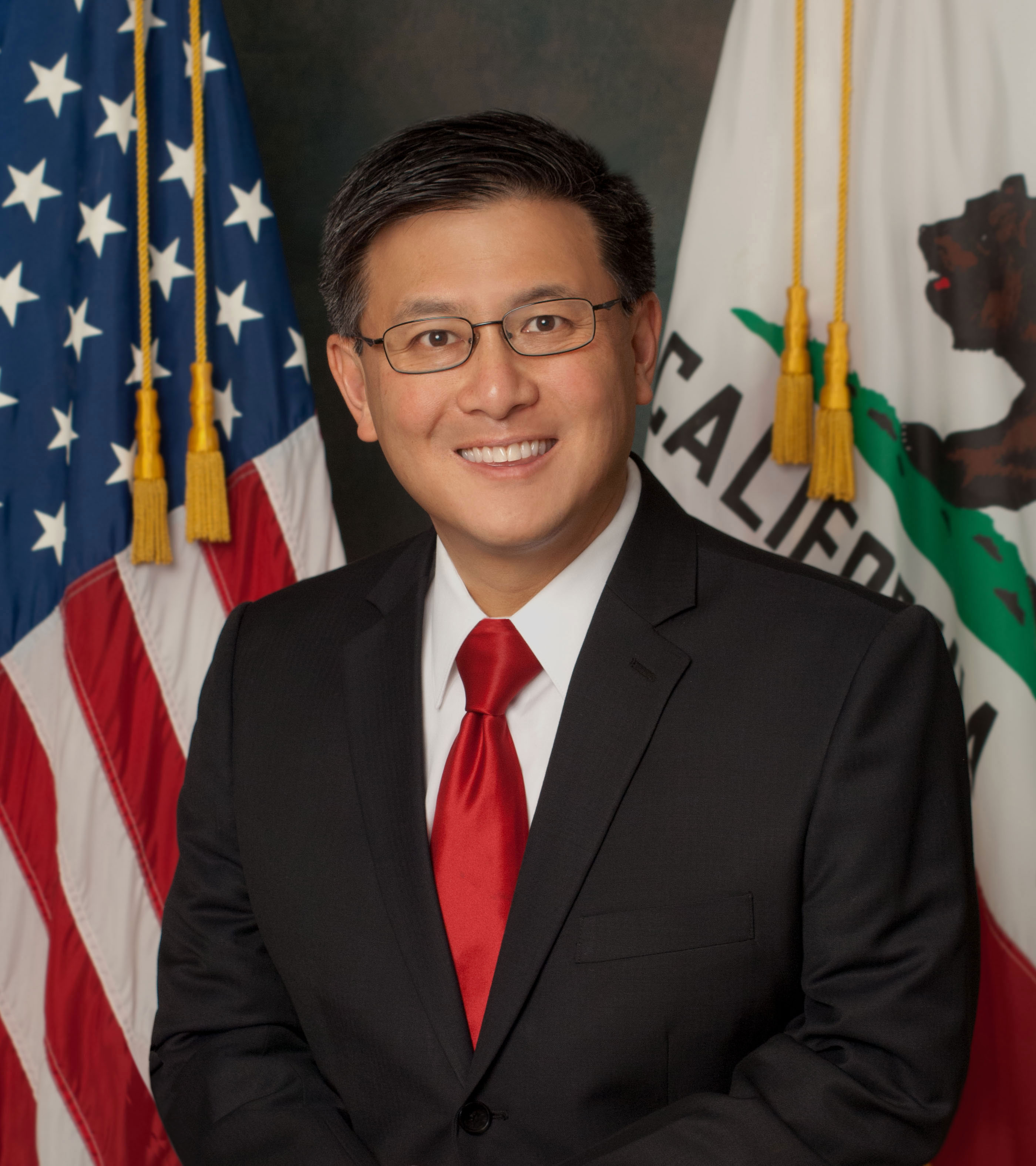
- Official portrait, 2015

33rd Treasurer of California
- In office January 5, 2015 – January 7, 2019
- Governor: Jerry Brown
- Preceded by: Bill Lockyer
- Succeeded by: Fiona Ma

31st Controller of California
- In office January 8, 2007 – January 5, 2015
- Governor: Arnold Schwarzenegger; Jerry Brown
- Preceded by: Steve Westly
- Succeeded by: Betty Yee

Member of the California State Board of Equalization from the 4th district
- In office January 3, 1997 – January 3, 2007
- Preceded by: Brad Sherman
- Succeeded by: Judy Chu

Personal details
- Born: July 31, 1962 (age 64) New York City, U.S.
- Party: Democratic
- Spouse: Terry Chi (m. 2005; div. 2018)
- Relatives: Joyce Chiang (sister)
- Education: University of South Florida (BS); Georgetown University (JD)

Chinese name
- Traditional Chinese: 江俊輝
- Simplified Chinese: 江俊辉
Transcriptions
Standard Mandarin
- Hanyu Pinyin: Jiāng Jùnhuī
- Wade–Giles: Chiang Chün-hui

John Chiang (Chinese: 江俊輝; born July 31, 1962) is an American politician who served as the 33rd Treasurer of California from 2015 to 2019. A member of the Democratic Party, he previously served as the 31st Controller of California from 2007 to 2015 and on the California State Board of Equalization from 1997 to 2007.

On May 17, 2016, Chiang announced his campaign for Governor of California in the 2018 election. He did not qualify for the general election, placing fifth in the non-partisan primary.

== Early life and education ==
Chiang was born to Taiwanese parents who immigrated to the United States. Chiang's father, Chiang Mu-tung (江牧東), a Pingtung County native of Hakka descent from Neipu, relocated to the United States in 1950 to pursue graduate studies at Cleveland State University, after graduating with a degree in chemical engineering from National Taiwan University. Chiang's mother, Shen Yin-hsiang (沈吟香), was a Tainan native, who studied abroad in Japan before immigrating to the United States to pursue further studies. Chiang's parents met at the University of Notre Dame, and soon married.

Chiang was born in New York City on July 31, 1962 and grew up in the Chicago suburbs. He attended Carl Sandburg High School where he served as student body vice-president alongside student body president Dave Jones. Lifelong friends, Chiang and Jones would run again together in 2010 on the California Democratic slate, with Chiang winning reelection as State Controller and Jones being elected Insurance Commissioner, and again in 2014, with Chiang being elected State Treasurer and Jones winning reelection as Insurance Commissioner. Both would go down in defeat in the 2018 primary, with Chiang coming in fifth place for Governor of California and Jones coming in third place for State Attorney General of California.

Chiang graduated with honors with a degree in finance from the University of South Florida and has a J.D. degree from the Georgetown University Law Center. His decision to pursue law was influenced by his maternal grandfather, Shen Rong (沈榮), who was a prominent lawyer in Taiwan.

== Early career ==
In 1987, Chiang moved to Los Angeles, where he got involved with the Democratic Party of the San Fernando Valley and the West LA Democratic Club.

Chiang began his career as a tax law specialist for the IRS. He worked as an attorney for then-California State Controller Gray Davis, and also worked on the staff of California Senator Barbara Boxer.

In 1997, Chiang was appointed to the California Board of Equalization after incumbent Brad Sherman resigned, having been elected to the U.S. House of Representatives. In 1998, Chiang was elected to the office; he was re-elected to a second four-year term in 2002-2006. He was Chair for three years and represented the Fourth District, primarily serving southern Los Angeles County.

== California State Controller (2007–2015) ==
Chiang ran for California State Controller in 2006. He won the Democratic primary with 53% of the vote, defeating State Senator Joe Dunn. In the general election, he defeated Republican state assemblyman Tony Strickland by over 870,000 votes. Chiang took office on January Monday 8, 2007.

Chiang ran for a second term in 2010. He was unopposed in the Democratic primary. In the general election, he had a rematch with Strickland, who had been elected to the state senate in the intervening period. Chiang defeated Strickland again, by more than 1.8 million votes.

=== Health benefits for retired state employees ===
In May 2007, Chiang released a report that found that the state of California "would have to pay an additional $2.2 billion annually" over 30 years in order to pay for health benefits for all currently retired state employees and current state employees who will be retiring. Chiang's actions were praised as having "gotten a needed discussion reignited".

=== Seizing unclaimed property ===
In June 2007, a U.S. district judge banned the State Controller's office from seizing unclaimed property because the State was not giving "fair notice to the owner and public". Because a ban could cause the State to lose $300 million per year in revenue, Chiang took steps to improve the notification of people whose assets were about to be seized, including sending them notices, and to improve the ability of people to recover their assets once seized. In October 2007, the U.S. District Judge found that Chiang's measures "satisfie[d] constitutional due process" and lifted his ban.

=== State worker salaries ===
In July 2008, former Governor Arnold Schwarzenegger was reported to be planning to "slash the pay of more than 200,000 state workers to the federal minimum of $6.55 per hour," among other measures, due to a lack of an approved state budget. Chiang defied the order, characterizing Schwarzenegger's idea as "a poorly devised strategy to put pressure on the Legislature to enact a budget" and stated that he would continue to pay state workers their full salaries. He issued IOUs for everything from contractors’ payments to tax refunds. Chiang claimed that he had "both constitutional and statutory authority" to continue payments and that Schwarzenegger was trying to make Chiang "do something that's improper and illegal". He received support from the Democratic leadership in the state Senate and Assembly. When Schwarzenegger issued a formal executive order, Chiang sent a formal letter to Schwarzenegger "reiterating his position". At a rally of state workers in Los Angeles, Chiang called them "innocent victims of a political struggle".

=== Bureau of State Audits review ===
In a report issued in May 2014, California's Bureau of State Audits (BSA) concluded that ""The number and magnitude of errors we found indicate the Controller’s Office lacks a sufficient review process to prevent and detect significant errors." A Sacramento news station added up the mistakes, calculating that BSA had reported $31.65 billion in errors. The controller’s office concurred with the BSA assessment, saying that the problems were due to high staff turnover, challenges in recruiting qualified staff, budget cuts, inadequate funding, and late, erroneous data from numerous state agencies.

== California State Treasurer (2015–2019) ==
Chiang was elected California State Treasurer in 2014, defeating Republican businessman Greg Conlon by more than 1.2 million votes, 58.8% to 41.2%. He was officially sworn into office specifically on January Monday 5, 2015, formally succeeding the retiring term-limited Democratic incumbent Bill Lockyer. Chiang did not run for reelection in 2018.

=== Wells Fargo ===
Chiang imposed a 12-month ban from investment work on Wells Fargo in September 2016, barring the bank from underwriting California's state debt for a year. This was in response to the federal report announcing that Wells Fargo employees had opened up to 2 million unauthorized accounts in an attempt to raise Wells Fargo profits. However, just 8 months later, Wells Fargo won a competitive bid to sell $636 million of general obligations in California. This is due to a state law that requires Chiang to accept only the lowest bid at an auction. A spokesman for Chiang said they "were pleased with the price," and "it does not reflect our feelings about their behavior toward their customers."

== 2018 gubernatorial bid ==
On May 17, 2016, Chiang announced his intentions to run for Governor of California in 2018. In polls conducted in January and February 2018, he only garnered 11% support. He was eliminated in the jungle primary when he placed fifth with 655,920 votes (9.4%).

== Personal life ==
Chiang has two younger brothers, Roger and Bob, and one sister, Joyce, who was murdered in 1999. Chiang is a Roman Catholic and cites his faith for his opposition to the death penalty. In 2016, he and his wife separated after a decade of marriage. They had no children together.

== Electoral history ==
California State Board of Equalization 4th District Democratic primary election, 1998
Party	Candidate	Votes	%
Democratic	John Chiang (appointed incumbent)	217,715	34.57
Democratic	Jose Fernandez	150,020	23.82
Democratic	Tyrone Vahedi	92,336	14.66
Democratic	Craig "Tax Freeze" Freis	65,256	10.36
Democratic	Gregorio Alejandro Armanta	53,130	8.44
Democratic	Gil Eisner	51,369	8.16

California State Board of Equalization 4th District election, 1998
Party	Candidate	Votes	%
Democratic	John Chiang (appointed incumbent)	881,724	60.23
Republican	Joe Adams, Jr.	437,171	29.86
Green	Glenn Trujillo Bailey	58,480	3.99
Peace and Freedom	Shirley Rachel Isaacson	45,104	3.08
Libertarian	William Jennings	41,514	2.84

California State Board of Equalization 4th District election, 2002
Party	Candidate	Votes	%
Democratic	John Chiang (incumbent)	863,369	63.6
Republican	Glen Forsch	410,312	30.2
Libertarian	Kenneth Weissman	85,434	6.2

California State Controller Democratic primary election, 2006
Party	Candidate	Votes	%
Democratic	John Chiang	1,157,760	53.3
Democratic	Joe Dunn	1,014,451	46.7

California State Controller election, 2006
Party	Candidate	Votes	%
Democratic	John Chiang	4,232,313	50.7
Republican	Tony Strickland	3,360,611	40.2
Green	Laura Wells	260,047	3.2
Peace and Freedom	Elizabeth Cervantes Barron	212,383	2.5
Libertarian	Donna Tello	188,934	2.2
American Independent	Warren Mark Campbell	106,761	1.2

California State Controller election, 2010
Party	Candidate	Votes	%
Democratic	John Chiang (incumbent)	5,325,357	55.2
Republican	Tony Strickland	3,487,014	36.1
Libertarian	Andrew "Andy" Favor	292,441	3.1
Peace and Freedom	Karen Martinez	209,638	2.2
Green	Ross Frankel	191,282	1.9
American Independent	Lawrence Beliz	154,145	1.5

2014 California State Treasurer primary election
Party	Candidate	Votes	%
Democratic	John Chiang	2,250,098	55.0
Republican	Greg Conlon	1,571,532	38.4
Green	Ellen Brown	270,388	6.6

2014 California State Treasurer general election
Party	Candidate	Votes	%
Democratic	John Chiang	4,176,793	58.8
Republican	Greg Conlon	2,925,895	41.2

2018 California gubernatorial primary
Party	Candidate	Votes	%
Democratic	Gavin Newsom	2,343,792	33.7%
Republican	John H. Cox	1,766,488	25.4%
Democratic	Antonio Villaraigosa	926,394	13.3%
Republican	Travis Allen	658,798	9.5%
Democratic	John Chiang	655,920	9.4%
Democratic	Delaine Eastin	234,869	3.4%
Democratic	Amanda Renteria	93,446	1.3%
Republican	Robert C. Newman II	44,674	0.6%
Democratic	Michael Shellenberger	31,692	0.5%
Republican	Peter Y. Liu	27,336	0.4%
Republican	Yvonne Girard	21,840	0.3%
Peace and Freedom	Gloria La Riva	19,075	0.3%
Democratic	J. Bribiesca	18,586	0.3%
Green	Josh Jones	16,131	0.2%
Libertarian	Zoltan Istvan	14,462	0.2%
Democratic	Albert Caesar Mezzetti	12,026	0.2%
Libertarian	Nickolas Wildstar	11,566	0.2%
Democratic	Robert Davidson Griffis	11,103	0.2%
Democratic	Akinyemi Agbede	9,380	0.1%
Democratic	Thomas Jefferson Cares	8,937	0.1%
Green	Christopher N. Carlson	7,302	0.1%
Democratic	Klement Tinaj	5,368	0.1%
No party preference	Hakan "Hawk" Mikado	5,346	0.1%
No party preference	Johnny Wattenburg	4,973	0.1%
No party preference	Desmond Silveira	4,633	0.1%
No party preference	Shubham Goel	4,020	0.1%
No party preference	Jeffrey Edward Taylor	3,973	0.1%
Green	Veronika Fimbres (write-in)	62	0.0%
No party preference	Arman Soltani (write-in)	32	0.0%
No party preference	Peter Crawford Valentino (write-in)	21	0.0%
Republican	K. Pearce (write-in)	8	0.0%
No party preference	Armando M. Arreola (write-in)	1	0.0%
Total votes		6,862,254	100%

Political offices
Preceded by Brad Sherman	Member of the California State Board of Equalization from the 4th district 1997–2007	Succeeded by Judy Chu
Preceded by Steve Westly	Controller of California; 2007–2015	Succeeded by Betty Yee
Preceded by Bill Lockyer	Treasurer of California; 2015–2019	Succeeded by Fiona Ma
