= 2006 California State Controller election =

- November 7, 2006
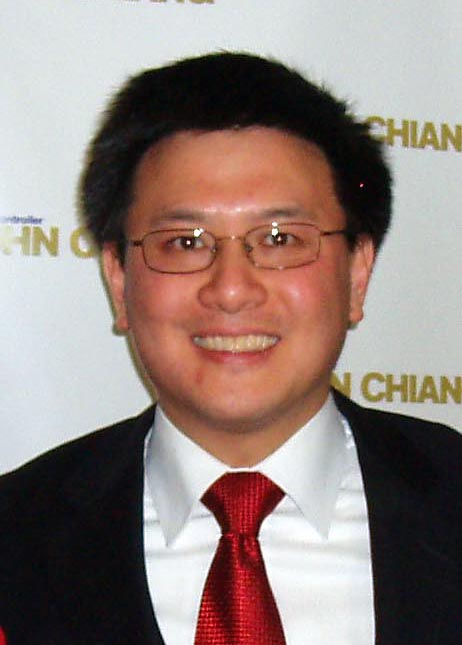

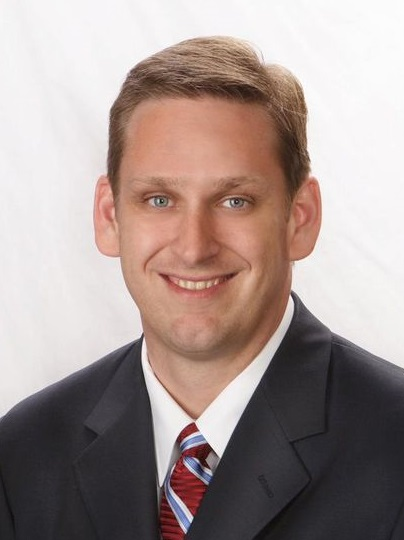
Nominee	John Chiang	Tony Strickland
Party	Democratic	Republican
Popular vote	4,232,313	3,360,611
Percentage	50.62%	40.19%
- County results Chiang: 40–50% 50–60% 60–70% 70–80% Strickland: 40–50% 50–60% 60–70%
Controller before election
Steve Westly
Democratic
Elected Controller
John Chiang
Democratic

The 2006 California State Controller election occurred on November 7, 2006. The primary elections took place on June 6, 2006. Board of Equalization Chair John Chiang, the Democratic nominee, defeated the Republican nominee, Assemblyman Tony Strickland, for the office previously held by Democrat Steve Westly, who ran for governor.

== Primary results ==
A bar graph of statewide results in this contest are available at https://web.archive.org/web/20070517222238/http://primary2006.ss.ca.gov/Returns/ctl/00.htm.

Results by county are available here and here.

=== Democratic ===
California State Controller Democratic primary, 2006
Candidate	Votes	%
John Chiang	1,157,760	53.30
Joe Dunn	1,014,451	46.70
Total votes	2,172,211	100.00

=== Republican ===
California State Controller Republican primary, 2006
Candidate	Votes	%
Tony Strickland	689,071	40.67
Abel Maldonado	626,559	37.98
Jim Stieringer	210,691	12.43
Bret Davis	91,760	5.42
David Harris	76,310	4.50
Total votes	1,694,391	100.00

=== Others ===
California State Controller primary, 2006 (Others)
Party	Candidate	Votes	%
Green	Laura Wells	32,092	100.00
American Independent	Warren Campbell	30,632	100.00
Libertarian	Donna Tello	16,700	100.00
Peace and Freedom	Elizabeth Cervantes Barron	4,047	100.00

== Results ==
California State Controller election, 2006
Party	Candidate	Votes	%
Democratic	John Chiang	4,232,313	50.62
Republican	Tony Strickland	3,360,611	40.19
Green	Laura Wells	260,047	3.11
Peace and Freedom	Elizabeth Cervantes Barron	212,383	2.54
Libertarian	Donna Tello	188,934	2.26
American Independent	Warren Campbell	106,761	1.28
Invalid or blank votes		538,010	6.05
Total votes		8,361,049	100.00
Turnout			39.29
Democratic hold			

=== Results by county ===
Results from the Secretary of State of California:

County	Chiang	Votes	Strickland	Votes	Wells	Votes	Tello	Votes	Barron	Votes	Campbell	Votes
San Francisco	74.4%	171,170	13.6%	31,265	6.7%	15,288	2.3%	5,436	2.2%	5,184	0.8%	1,914
Alameda	69.2%	270,660	21.1%	82,330	5.1%	20,048	1.9%	7,448	1.8%	7,401	0.9%	3,652
Marin	64.6%	64,585	26.2%	26,160	5.0%	4,952	1.5%	1,540	2.2%	2,282	0.5%	549
Santa Cruz	62.5%	53,633	24.9%	21,362	6.3%	5,398	2.4%	2,068	2.8%	2,429	1.1%	987
San Mateo	61.9%	120,634	28.2%	54,876	4.1%	7,865	2.6%	5,149	2.2%	4,374	1.0%	2,088
Yolo	60.1%	31,636	32.4%	17,017	3.7%	1,951	1.7%	914	1.5%	821	0.6%	338
Sonoma	59.5%	99,046	28.9%	48,153	5.3%	8,735	2.8%	4,672	2.5%	4,297	1.0%	1,797
Los Angeles	57.6%	1,089,306	32.9%	621,387	2.8%	53,797	3.4%	63,723	2.1%	41,583	1.2%	23,669
Santa Clara	57.1%	233,076	32.5%	132,570	3.9%	15,887	2.2%	9,116	2.9%	12,015	1.4%	5,850
Contra Costa	57.0%	165,894	35.3%	102,723	3.1%	9,012	1.5%	4,642	1.9%	5,604	1.2%	3,522
Solano	56.6%	57,241	35.8%	36,158	2.6%	2,551	1.9%	1,966	1.8%	1,921	1.3%	1,343
Mendocino	55.0%	16,264	29.5%	8,709	7.8%	2,306	3.1%	933	3.1%	924	1.5%	462
Monterey	54.0%	46,017	36.0%	30,722	3.6%	3,037	2.4%	2,125	2.4%	2,051	1.6%	1,409
Napa	53.2%	21,710	36.4%	14,859	4.1%	1,700	2.5%	1,046	2.5%	1,025	1.3%	544
Imperial	51.8%	11,234	34.3%	7,441	2.3%	513	7.1%	1,549	2.4%	523	2.1%	459
Sacramento	51.8%	181,890	41.3%	144,901	2.6%	8,806	1.5%	5,539	1.7%	6,161	1.1%	4,079
Humboldt	49.7%	23,001	35.3%	16,335	8.1%	3,733	2.7%	1,274	2.9%	1,334	1.3%	612
Lake	49.6%	9,344	38.5%	7,248	4.4%	816	3.1%	600	2.6%	493	1.8%	346
San Diego	48.4%	362,343	44.7%	334,607	2.1%	15,917	1.8%	13,679	2.1%	16,106	0.9%	7,296
San Joaquin	48.2%	65,203	43.5%	58,840	2.1%	2,949	2.9%	3,903	1.9%	2,687	1.4%	1,934
Alpine	47.6%	238	40.6%	203	4.6%	23	2.3%	12	3.4%	17	1.5%	8
Merced	47.1%	19,263	45.1%	18,418	1.7%	707	3.2%	1,281	1.8%	772	1.1%	486
San Benito	46.8%	6,479	41.6%	5,760	3.3%	471	3.8%	526	2.7%	379	1.8%	253
Stanislaus	46.5%	47,275	46.6%	47,371	1.6%	1,713	2.5%	2,536	1.5%	1,599	1.3%	1,349
Santa Barbara	44.0%	50,931	45.2%	52,228	3.9%	4,500	2.6%	3,017	3.1%	3,686	1.2%	1,410
Nevada	43.7%	18,223	48.1%	20,062	4.2%	1,767	1.1%	472	2.3%	966	0.6%	284
Fresno	43.7%	74,781	48.8%	83,517	1.9%	3,301	2.9%	4,872	1.8%	3,245	0.9%	1,589
Del Norte	42.6%	2,774	46.8%	3,046	3.4%	225	2.2%	145	2.7%	180	2.3%	150
Ventura	41.3%	88,769	51.3%	110,132	2.3%	5,012	1.9%	4,219	2.3%	4,995	0.9%	1,944
Mono	40.9%	1,485	47.5%	1,726	4.4%	159	2.3%	85	3.8%	139	1.1%	42
Tuolumne	40.7%	8,388	51.5%	10,622	2.9%	592	1.6%	346	2.0%	426	1.3%	274
San Bernardino	40.4%	134,620	49.6%	165,498	2.4%	8,147	3.2%	10,615	2.5%	8,384	1.9%	6,477
Amador	40.2%	5,860	52.4%	7,649	2.8%	405	1.1%	166	1.9%	280	1.6%	239
Mariposa	40.0%	2,989	51.8%	3,868	3.2%	237	1.4%	109	2.1%	161	1.5%	113
Trinity	39.9%	2,219	45.9%	2,554	5.8%	326	2.8%	157	4.1%	230	1.5%	86
San Luis Obispo	39.8%	36,817	51.6%	47,712	3.5%	3,172	1.6%	1,507	2.3%	2,180	1.2%	1,159
Plumas	39.6%	3,417	52.9%	4,573	2.8%	236	1.3%	121	2.0%	176	1.4%	122
Calaveras	39.4%	6,884	51.5%	9,010	3.2%	551	1.7%	310	2.7%	473	1.5%	271
Butte	39.2%	26,252	50.1%	33,587	4.1%	2,735	2.2%	1,537	2.6%	1,734	1.8%	1,219
Riverside	39.1%	145,586	52.0%	193,518	2.3%	8,635	2.8%	10,397	2.2%	8,538	1.6%	6,051
Kings	38.7%	8,711	55.1%	12,410	1.3%	307	2.3%	496	1.3%	306	1.3%	297
Siskiyou	38.0%	6,138	52.9%	8,542	2.8%	469	1.5%	254	3.0%	474	1.8%	297
El Dorado	38.0%	25,016	54.7%	36,005	3.1%	2,012	1.0%	710	2.2%	1,449	1.0%	715
Placer	37.8%	45,028	55.2%	65,781	2.5%	2,995	1.4%	1,684	2.0%	2,498	1.1%	1,364
Kern	37.7%	55,538	54.6%	80,558	1.7%	2,523	2.5%	3,627	1.8%	2,773	1.7%	2,644
Colusa	37.6%	1,794	55.8%	2,667	1.5%	73	2.0%	97	1.3%	63	1.8%	90
Tulare	37.3%	25,288	56.5%	38,351	1.6%	1,109	1.8%	1,268	1.3%	908	1.5%	1,031
Madera	36.8%	10,844	55.9%	16,498	1.9%	554	2.4%	691	1.7%	520	1.3%	412
Sierra	35.4%	553	53.4%	834	4.6%	71	1.5%	25	4.1%	63	1.0%	17
Inyo	35.2%	2,196	54.0%	3,367	4.4%	271	2.0%	129	2.9%	177	1.5%	99
Yuba	35.1%	4,784	54.9%	7,477	3.0%	407	2.0%	273	2.4%	339	2.6%	356
Sutter	35.0%	8,130	57.8%	13,407	1.7%	417	2.2%	505	1.8%	422	1.5%	351
Orange	33.1%	231,448	57.2%	400,206	2.6%	18,271	3.0%	20,999	2.6%	18,784	1.5%	10,702
Tehama	32.3%	5,691	58.4%	10,297	2.4%	424	2.4%	433	2.2%	406	2.3%	410
Shasta	31.7%	18,087	59.6%	34,073	2.4%	1,413	1.7%	1,020	2.6%	1,431	2.0%	1,193
Glenn	31.5%	2,292	60.3%	4,388	1.9%	140	2.4%	172	1.9%	143	2.0%	153
Lassen	31.4%	2,624	57.9%	4,849	3.6%	298	1.9%	163	3.1%	267	2.1%	180
Modoc	28.1%	1,014	60.5%	2,184	3.3%	118	2.3%	85	3.8%	136	2.0%	74

== See also ==
- California state elections, 2006
- State of California
- California State Controller
