= Killing of Joyce Chiang =

American lawyer

Joyce Chiang
- 江宜玲
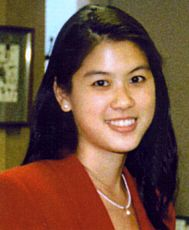
- Born: December 7, 1970; Chicago, Illinois, U.S.
- Died: c. January 9, 1999 (aged 28); Washington, D.C., U.S.
- Education: Smith College (BA); Georgetown University (JD)
- Relatives: John Chiang (brother)

Joyce Chiang (Chinese: 江宜玲; December 7, 1970 – c. January 9, 1999) was an American attorney with the U.S. Immigration and Naturalization Service who disappeared on January 9, 1999, in Washington, D.C., and was later found dead. The story of her disappearance and the discovery of her remains in the Potomac River, which drew only local news coverage at the time, was rediscovered and received some national attention in the wake of the similar disappearance of Chandra Levy in May 2001. Police initially promoted the idea that she had committed suicide, but a decade later said she had been the victim of a robbery-related homicide. They identified two suspects but no one was charged with the crime. Chiang was the sister of future California State Treasurer John Chiang.

== Life ==
Joyce Chiang was one of four children and the only daughter of Taiwanese immigrants raised in Chicago and in Southern California. Her three brothers are John Chiang, who became Controller of the State of California in 2007 and Treasurer of California in 2015; Robert Chiang; and Roger Chiang, who is currently the Executive In Charge at the television show America's Most Wanted, and in 1999, lived with Joyce and was working for the U.S. Department of Housing and Urban Development.

Chiang attended Smith College, where she was student government president in 1992. She graduated from the evening division of Georgetown University Law School in 1995, while working for Congressman Howard Berman as an immigration advisor. After earning her Juris Doctor (J.D.) degree, she worked in the General Counsel's office of the Immigration and Naturalization Service.

== Disappearance and death ==
On January 9, 1999, the day of Chiang's disappearance, she had met with several friends for a movie and dinner, and one of those friends offered her a ride home. Chiang asked her friend to make one quick stop at the Starbucks at the intersection of Connecticut Avenue NW and R Street NW. Chiang told her friend that she would walk the four blocks home from the coffee shop, but she never made it to her apartment. Her brother Roger was her roommate and reported her missing. Because Chiang was a federal employee, the FBI took the lead in investigating the case.

A couple walking through Anacostia Park the next day found Chiang's billfold and turned it in to park police, who filed it in the park's lost and found. Four days later, the couple recognized Chiang's photo in media coverage and alerted the FBI, who arranged a search of the park and discovered her apartment keys, video and grocery cards, and gloves. The jacket in which Chiang was last seen was also found, torn down the back.

During the three-month span in which she was missing, a candlelight vigil was held every Saturday night in Dupont Circle. Her brother Roger was instrumental in several televised and print appeals for more information on her case and disappearance.

Three months after the disappearance and 8 miles (13 kilometers) away, a canoeist on the Potomac River found a badly decomposed body later identified through DNA analysis as Chiang's. The cause of death could not be determined, and for more than 12 years it was considered a cold case.

== Speculated connection with Chandra Levy disappearance and promotion of suicide theory ==
In addition to the Congressional intern connection, Chiang had lived only four blocks away from where Chandra Levy would later take up residency, in Dupont Circle. Both were young, brunette women of petite stature. The Starbucks where Chiang was last seen was later frequented by Levy. These similarities have led to various theories that both women were killed by the same person, although the Congressman-in-sex-scandal aspect of Levy's case, coupled with the long time that passed before her body was found, led to more media interest.

In 2001, at the height of the media frenzy surrounding the disappearance of Chandra Levy, police attempted to discourage a serial killer theory by stating that Chiang had committed suicide. Chiang's family turned to the media to dispel that notion.

== Later developments in 2011 ==
In January 2011, WTTG-Fox 5 reported that the police had solved Chiang's murder, identifying two suspects who had attempted to rob her on the night she disappeared.

In May 2011, D.C. police held a press conference in which they said that Chiang had not committed suicide, but was instead the victim of a homicide, and said the case was now considered closed. They said that one suspect was in prison in Maryland for a different offense, and another suspect was living in Guyana, which has no extradition treaty with the U.S. According to WTTG-Fox 5, an unnamed "source familiar with the case has identified the men as Steve Allen and Neil Joaquin, two men who worked as a team abducting people off the street with the intention of robbing them." Partly based on similarities to another attack committed by the two men after Chiang's disappearance, police hypothesized that the men drove Chiang to the Anacostia River (which eventually leads to the Potomac). On the day of the press conference, the crime-fighting television show host John Walsh stated that the men either threw Chiang into the river, or Chiang attempted to escape but slipped on the icy river bank and drowned. The police did not confirm or deny Walsh's theories, nor were any charges filed. Chiang's family expressed thanks for reopening the consideration of the cold case and for giving the family closure by announcing the new conclusion.

== Remembrances ==
The Joyce Chiang Memorial Scholarship was established with the help of her family, to support one student each year with an internship at the Asian American Justice Center (AAJC) in Washington, D.C.

The Joyce Chiang Memorial Award was established at Georgetown University Law Center by her friends and colleagues. It supports "an evening student with a demonstrable commitment to public service."

== See also ==
- List of unsolved murders (1980–1999)
