= 2014 California State Treasurer election =

- November 4, 2014
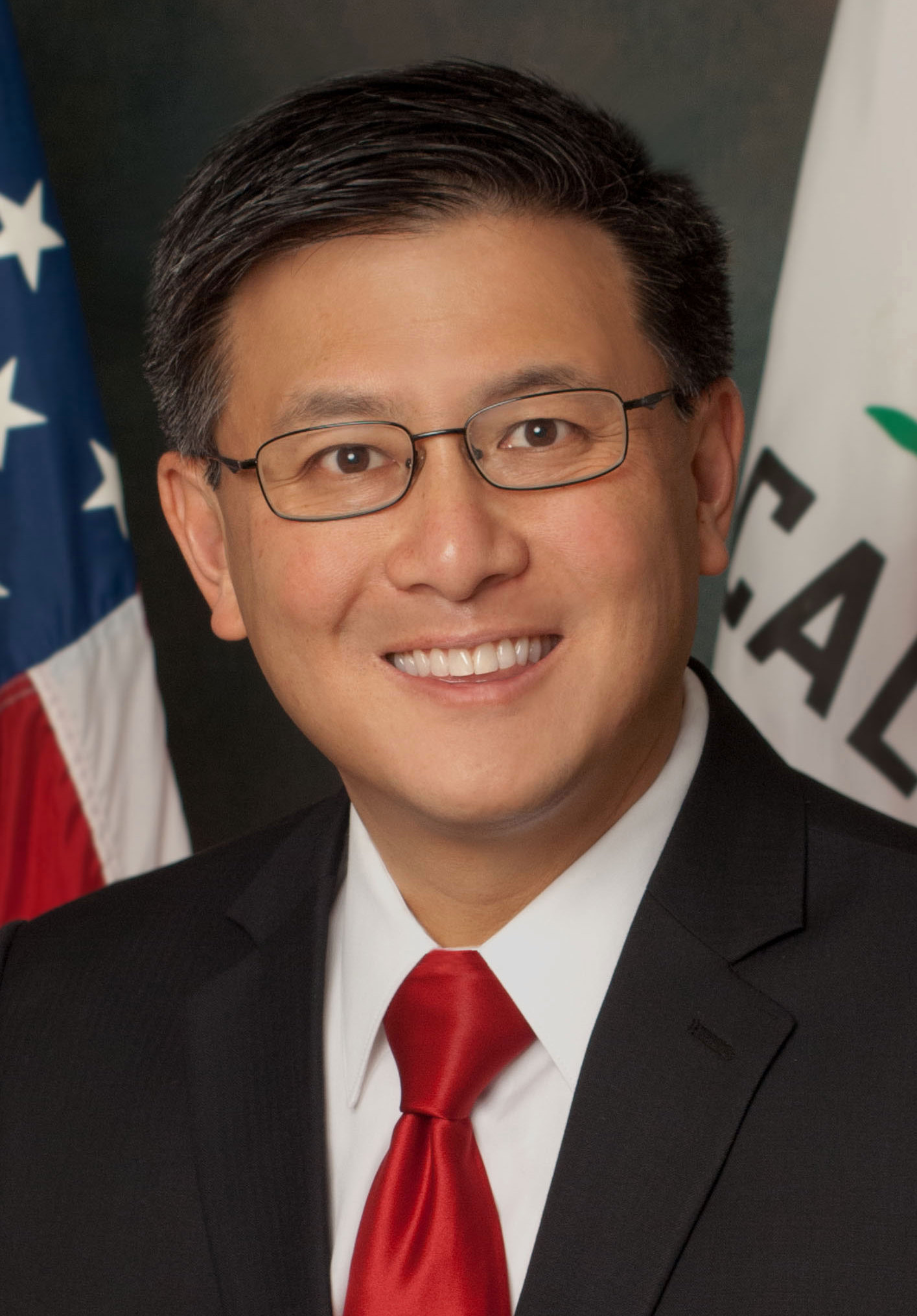

Nominee	John Chiang	Greg Conlon
Party	Democratic	Republican
Popular vote	4,176,793	2,925,895
Percentage	58.81%	41.19%
- County results Chiang: 50–60% 60–70% 70–80% 80–90% Conlon: 50–60% 60–70%
State Treasurer before election
Bill Lockyer
Democratic
Elected State Treasurer
John Chiang
Democratic

The 2014 California State Treasurer election was held on November 4, 2014, to elect the State Treasurer of California. Incumbent Democratic Treasurer Bill Lockyer was term-limited and ineligible to run for re-election to a third term in office.

A primary election was held on June 3, 2014. Under California's nonpartisan blanket primary law, all candidates appear on the same ballot, regardless of party. In the primary, voters may vote for any candidate, regardless of their party affiliation. The top two finishers — regardless of party — advance to the general election in November, even if a candidate manages to receive a majority of the votes cast in the primary election. Washington is the only other state with this system, a so-called "top two primary" (Louisiana has a similar "jungle primary"). Democrat John Chiang and Republican Greg Conlon finished first and second, respectively, and contested the general election, which Chiang won.

== Primary election ==
=== Candidates ===
==== Democratic Party ====
===== Declared =====
- John Chiang, California State Controller

==== Republican Party ====
===== Declared =====
- Greg Conlon, businessman, Certified Public Accountant, nominee for California State Treasurer in 2002, and nominee for California's 12th congressional district in 2008

==== Green Party ====
===== Declared =====
- Ellen Brown, attorney and writer

=== Results ===
Results by county Chiang: 40–50%; 50–60%; 60–70%; 70–80%; Conlon: 40–50%; 50–60%; 60–70%

Blanket primary results
Party	Candidate	Votes	%
Democratic	John Chiang	2,250,098	54.99
Republican	Greg Conlon	1,571,532	38.40
Green	Ellen Brown	270,388	6.61
Total votes		4,092,018	100.00

==== By county ====
County	John Chiang Democratic		Greg Conlon Republican		Ellen Brown Green		Margin		Total
County	#	%	#	%	#	%	#	%	Total
Alameda	131,829	71.33%	34,978	18.93%	18,000	9.74%	96,851	52.41%	184,807
Alpine	268	58.64%	146	31.95%	43	9.41%	122	26.70%	457
Amador	4,096	45.05%	4,398	48.37%	599	6.59%	-302	-3.32%	9,093
Butte	17,356	44.24%	18,659	47.56%	3,217	8.20%	-1,303	-3.32%	39,232
Calaveras	5,026	43.14%	5,797	49.76%	827	7.10%	-771	-6.62%	11,650
Colusa	1,217	38.77%	1,757	55.97%	165	5.26%	-540	-17.20%	3,139
Contra Costa	87,657	61.70%	44,230	31.13%	10,176	7.16%	43,427	30.57%	142,063
Del Norte	2,555	46.92%	2,461	45.19%	430	7.90%	94	1.73%	5,446
El Dorado	17,670	44.32%	19,869	49.83%	2,333	5.85%	-2,199	-5.52%	39,872
Fresno	49,453	48.24%	48,636	47.44%	4,424	4.32%	817	0.80%	102,513
Glenn	1,763	34.36%	3,015	58.76%	353	6.88%	-1,252	-24.40%	5,131
Humboldt	13,471	52.61%	8,740	34.13%	3,396	13.26%	4,731	18.48%	25,607
Imperial	9,458	58.83%	5,282	32.86%	1,336	8.31%	4,176	25.98%	16,076
Inyo	1,554	42.62%	1,837	50.38%	255	6.99%	-283	-7.76%	3,646
Kern	25,307	37.04%	39,620	58.00%	3,388	4.96%	-14,313	-20.95%	68,315
Kings	5,631	39.19%	8,135	56.62%	602	4.19%	-2,504	-17.43%	14,368
Lake	7,349	51.63%	5,067	35.60%	1,818	12.77%	2,282	16.03%	14,234
Lassen	2,196	40.05%	2,979	54.33%	308	5.62%	-783	-14.28%	5,483
Los Angeles	463,273	63.22%	223,371	30.48%	46,199	6.30%	239,902	32.74%	732,843
Madera	6,978	37.91%	10,594	57.56%	833	4.53%	-3,616	-19.65%	18,405
Marin	37,341	68.94%	12,406	22.90%	4,421	8.16%	24,935	46.03%	54,168
Mariposa	1,862	40.48%	2,394	52.04%	344	7.48%	-532	-11.57%	4,600
Mendocino	8,747	57.81%	4,029	26.63%	2,355	15.56%	4,718	31.18%	15,131
Merced	9,958	47.67%	9,657	46.23%	1,274	6.10%	301	1.44%	20,889
Modoc	782	30.90%	1,549	61.20%	200	7.90%	-767	-30.30%	2,531
Mono	1,367	48.63%	1,218	43.33%	226	8.04%	149	5.30%	2,811
Monterey	29,882	60.44%	15,946	32.25%	3,610	7.30%	13,936	28.19%	49,438
Napa	14,919	57.66%	8,847	34.19%	2,109	8.15%	6,072	23.47%	25,875
Nevada	11,805	46.57%	11,298	44.57%	2,246	8.86%	507	2.00%	25,349
Orange	127,148	40.09%	173,717	54.77%	16,325	5.15%	-46,569	-14.68%	317,190
Placer	30,846	46.25%	32,785	49.16%	3,064	4.59%	-1,939	-2.91%	66,695
Plumas	2,076	42.69%	2,487	51.14%	300	6.17%	-411	-8.45%	4,863
Riverside	81,087	44.90%	89,930	49.79%	9,596	5.31%	-8,843	-4.90%	180,613
Sacramento	113,825	61.65%	60,956	33.02%	9,841	5.33%	52,869	28.64%	184,622
San Benito	3,660	52.29%	2,819	40.27%	521	7.44%	841	12.01%	7,000
San Bernardino	66,482	44.23%	74,906	49.83%	8,925	5.94%	-8,424	-5.60%	150,313
San Diego	191,322	48.69%	182,286	46.39%	19,355	4.93%	9,036	2.30%	392,963
San Francisco	86,903	75.67%	15,042	13.10%	12,893	11.23%	71,861	62.58%	114,838
San Joaquin	40,548	52.62%	32,077	41.63%	4,430	5.75%	8,471	10.99%	77,055
San Luis Obispo	29,375	50.31%	25,821	44.22%	3,197	5.47%	3,554	6.09%	58,393
San Mateo	56,752	64.76%	23,790	27.15%	7,091	8.09%	32,962	37.61%	87,633
Santa Barbara	34,091	50.34%	29,278	43.23%	4,350	6.42%	4,813	7.11%	67,719
Santa Clara	153,212	64.19%	66,102	27.69%	19,389	8.12%	87,110	36.49%	238,703
Santa Cruz	29,363	64.99%	11,062	24.48%	4,756	10.53%	18,301	40.51%	45,181
Shasta	11,023	38.35%	15,680	54.55%	2,039	7.09%	-4,657	-16.20%	28,742
Sierra	505	41.36%	616	50.45%	100	8.19%	-111	-9.09%	1,221
Siskiyou	4,425	42.81%	5,066	49.01%	845	8.18%	-641	-6.20%	10,336
Solano	31,311	60.37%	17,264	33.28%	3,294	6.35%	14,047	27.08%	51,869
Sonoma	58,451	63.66%	23,929	26.06%	9,441	10.28%	34,522	37.60%	91,821
Stanislaus	25,137	48.86%	23,492	45.66%	2,819	5.48%	1,645	3.20%	51,448
Sutter	5,852	40.64%	7,810	54.24%	738	5.13%	-1,958	-13.60%	14,400
Tehama	4,364	35.59%	7,052	57.51%	846	6.90%	-2,688	-21.92%	12,262
Trinity	1,531	44.07%	1,518	43.70%	425	12.23%	13	0.37%	3,474
Tulare	15,447	37.05%	24,454	58.66%	1,786	4.28%	-9,007	-21.61%	41,687
Tuolumne	4,994	43.97%	5,599	49.29%	766	6.74%	-605	-5.33%	11,359
Ventura	46,180	47.36%	46,173	47.35%	5,164	5.30%	7	0.01%	97,517
Yolo	20,053	65.53%	8,549	27.94%	1,999	6.53%	11,504	37.59%	30,601
Yuba	3,365	40.41%	4,357	52.32%	606	7.28%	-992	-11.91%	8,328
Totals	2,250,098	54.99%	1,571,532	38.40%	270,388	6.61%	678,566	16.58%	4,092,018

== General election ==
=== Polling ===
Poll source	Date(s) administered	Sample size	Margin of error	John Chiang (D)	Greg Conlon (R)	Undecided
GQR/American Viewpoint	October 22–29, 2014	1,162	± 3.3%	52%	34%	14%
Field Poll	October 15–28, 2014	941	± 3.4%	46%	35%	19%
Field Poll	October 27–31, 2014	467	± 4.8%	52%	26%	22%

=== Results ===
2014 California State Treasurer election
Party	Candidate	Votes	%
Democratic	John Chiang	4,176,793	58.81
Republican	Greg Conlon	2,925,895	41.19
Total votes		7,102,688	100.00
Democratic hold			

==== By county ====
County	John Chiang Democratic		Greg Conlon Republican		Margin		Total votes cast
County	#	%	#	%	#	%	Total votes cast
Alameda	272,615	79.15%	71,802	20.85%	200,813	58.31%	344,417
Alpine	279	61.05%	178	38.95%	101	22.10%	457
Amador	5,795	46.13%	6,767	53.87%	-972	-7.74%	12,562
Butte	27,915	47.05%	31,410	52.95%	-3,495	-5.89%	59,325
Calaveras	6,861	44.83%	8,442	55.17%	-1,581	-10.33%	15,303
Colusa	1,687	41.48%	2,380	58.52%	-693	-17.04%	4,067
Contra Costa	157,989	64.52%	86,895	35.48%	71,094	29.03%	244,884
Del Norte	3,520	51.58%	3,304	48.42%	216	3.17%	6,824
El Dorado	27,028	45.22%	32,745	54.78%	-5,717	-9.56%	59,773
Fresno	79,667	50.66%	77,599	49.34%	2,068	1.31%	157,266
Glenn	1,965	33.58%	3,886	66.42%	-1,921	-32.83%	5,851
Humboldt	22,635	62.99%	13,298	37.01%	9,337	25.98%	35,933
Imperial	13,064	63.00%	7,671	37.00%	5,393	26.01%	20,735
Inyo	2,343	44.01%	2,981	55.99%	-638	-11.98%	5,324
Kern	53,462	40.42%	78,792	59.58%	-25,330	-19.15%	132,254
Kings	9,742	44.20%	12,297	55.80%	-2,555	-11.59%	22,039
Lake	9,853	58.00%	7,136	42.00%	2,717	15.99%	16,989
Lassen	2,517	37.36%	4,220	62.64%	-1,703	-25.28%	6,737
Los Angeles	949,745	66.93%	469,300	33.07%	480,445	33.86%	1,419,045
Madera	11,028	41.63%	15,462	58.37%	-4,434	-16.74%	26,490
Marin	61,410	73.96%	21,616	26.04%	39,794	47.93%	83,026
Mariposa	2,686	41.65%	3,763	58.35%	-1,077	-16.70%	6,449
Mendocino	15,967	68.30%	7,412	31.70%	8,555	36.59%	23,379
Merced	18,668	51.16%	17,821	48.84%	847	2.32%	36,489
Modoc	876	31.22%	1,930	68.78%	-1,054	-37.56%	2,806
Mono	1,535	51.01%	1,474	48.99%	61	2.03%	3,009
Monterey	47,112	65.32%	25,018	34.68%	22,094	30.63%	72,130
Napa	22,680	62.12%	13,829	37.88%	8,851	24.24%	36,509
Nevada	19,761	52.95%	17,561	47.05%	2,200	5.89%	37,322
Orange	262,238	43.20%	344,787	56.80%	-82,549	-13.60%	607,025
Placer	48,984	44.28%	61,651	55.72%	-12,667	-11.45%	110,635
Plumas	3,033	44.01%	3,858	55.99%	-825	-11.97%	6,891
Riverside	161,317	46.97%	182,133	53.03%	-20,816	-6.06%	343,450
Sacramento	199,898	63.03%	117,245	36.97%	82,653	26.06%	317,143
San Benito	7,719	58.40%	5,499	41.60%	2,220	16.80%	13,218
San Bernardino	136,785	48.45%	145,535	51.55%	-8,750	-3.10%	282,320
San Diego	341,430	52.22%	312,406	47.78%	29,024	4.44%	653,836
San Francisco	175,961	83.94%	33,665	16.06%	142,296	67.88%	209,626
San Joaquin	62,218	54.46%	52,032	45.54%	10,186	8.92%	114,250
San Luis Obispo	43,434	52.04%	40,024	47.96%	3,410	4.09%	83,458
San Mateo	107,241	69.47%	47,126	30.53%	60,115	38.94%	154,367
Santa Barbara	59,031	55.29%	47,738	44.71%	11,293	10.58%	106,769
Santa Clara	258,453	68.13%	120,893	31.87%	137,560	36.26%	379,346
Santa Cruz	52,399	74.95%	17,516	25.05%	34,883	49.89%	69,915
Shasta	20,485	37.01%	34,862	62.99%	-14,377	-25.98%	55,347
Sierra	662	44.58%	823	55.42%	-161	-10.84%	1,485
Siskiyou	5,969	44.31%	7,501	55.69%	-1,532	-11.37%	13,470
Solano	54,685	62.52%	32,790	37.48%	21,895	25.03%	87,475
Sonoma	96,953	70.05%	41,448	29.95%	55,505	40.10%	138,401
Stanislaus	43,655	49.21%	45,061	50.79%	-1,406	-1.58%	88,716
Sutter	8,296	41.53%	11,680	58.47%	-3,384	-16.94%	19,976
Tehama	5,296	34.79%	9,927	65.21%	-4,631	-30.42%	15,223
Trinity	1,831	48.07%	1,978	51.93%	-147	-3.86%	3,809
Tulare	24,572	40.04%	36,790	59.96%	-12,218	-19.91%	61,362
Tuolumne	7,572	45.43%	9,095	54.57%	-1,523	-9.14%	16,667
Ventura	100,708	51.75%	93,903	48.25%	6,805	3.50%	194,611
Yolo	30,443	68.85%	13,776	31.15%	16,667	37.69%	44,219
Yuba	5,120	41.68%	7,164	58.32%	-2,044	-16.64%	12,284
Total	4,176,793	58.81%	2,925,895	41.19%	1,250,898	17.61%	7,102,688
