= Joe Dunn (California politician) =

American politician (born 1958)

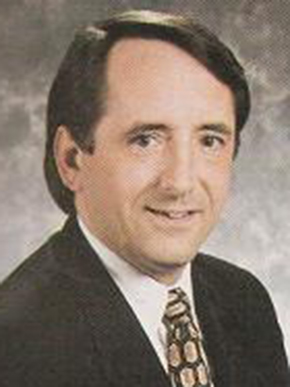

Member of the California Senate from the 34th district
- In office December 7, 1998 – November 4, 2006
- Preceded by: Rob Hurtt
- Succeeded by: Lou Correa

Personal details
- Born: September 5, 1958 (age 67) St. Paul, Minnesota, U.S.
- Party: Democratic
- Spouse: Diane
- Children: 2
- Education: College of St. Thomas; University of Minnesota Law School

Joseph Lawrence Dunn (born September 5, 1958) is an American former California State Senator who represented California's 34th Senate District in central Orange County from 1998 to 2006.

== Early life and career ==
Dunn was born in St. Paul, Minnesota and graduated from the College of St. Thomas and University of Minnesota Law School.

== California State Senate ==
As senator, Dunn led the state's investigation into Enron's involvement in the 2000–2001 energy crisis. He was first elected to the state Senate in 1998, when he unseated incumbent Republican Rob Hurtt by a 51% to 49% margin. Dunn was reelected in 2002. He ran for the Democratic nomination for Controller in 2006 but lost by 53% to 47% to John Chiang, who would then go on to win the general.

In October 2006, Dunn was appointed as CEO of the California Medical Association.

== State Bar of California ==
In 2010, Dunn was selected as the Executive Director of the State Bar of California. On November 13, 2014, the State Bar issued a statement saying that Dunn's employment as Executive Director had been terminated by the Board of Trustees. According to the Courthouse New Service, Dunn then filed a whistleblower lawsuit against the State Bar challenging the termination because he had exposed malfeasance and "egregious improprieties." The State Bar denied Dunn's allegations, saying the "Board received a complaint from a high-level employee raising serious, wide-ranging allegations about ... Dunn and certain State Bar employees." In January 2016, The Recorder released a report indicating that State Bar, while under Dunn's leadership, incurred excessive international travel expenses for trips to El Salvador, Mexico, Guatemala, Nicaragua, Peru and Mongolia. Dunn's allegations against the State Bar were diverted to an arbitration proceeding under terms of his contract. In March 2017, Arbitrator Edward Infante issued a ruling that exonerated the State Bar, which had said it fired Dunn in 2014 for misleading the agency's board about critical policy matters.

In July 2022, the State Bar filed disciplinary charges against Dunn, alleging three counts of moral turpitude during his time heading the organization and seeking his disbarment. In 2025, the State Bar Court of California suspended him from practicing law for 30 days, and the Supreme Court of California declined to hear his appeal.

Dunn is a founding partner of The Senators (Ret.) Firm, LLP, "a law and political consulting firm where [the founders]...exert a powerful influence on national and statewide issues."

California Senate
Preceded by Rob Hurtt	California State Senate, 34th District; December 7, 1998 - November 4, 2006	Succeeded by Lou Correa
