= American SAFE Act of 2015 =

Legislative proposal in the United States

SAFE Act
- Long title: American Security Against Foreign Enemies Act of 2015
- Acronyms (colloquial): SAFE
- Nicknames: American SAFE Act of 2015
- Announced in: the 114th United States Congress
- Sponsored by: Michael McCaul
- Number of co-sponsors: 103

Codification
- Agencies affected: FBI, Department of Homeland Security, National Intelligence Program

Legislative history
- Introduced in the House as H.R. 4038 by Michael McCaul (R–TX) on November 17, 2015

The SAFE Act (full title American Security Against Foreign Enemies Act of 2015) was a United States legislative proposal for Syrian and Iraqi refugees that would require extra background investigation before entry into the US.

Additional procedure to authorize admission for each refugee

- The Federal Bureau of Investigation (FBI) certifies they received a background investigation sufficient to determine whether the refugee is a U.S. security threat, to both the Department of Homeland Security (DHS) and the Director of National Intelligence.
- The Department of Homeland Security, FBI and Director of National Intelligence unanimously certify to Congress that the refugee not such a threat.

The bill was first introduced in the House on November 17, 2015, H.R. 4038 by Michael McCaul. It was passed by the House, but on January 20, 2016, it failed cloture in the senate (also known as a filibuster.)

== Background ==
The SAFE Act was created in response to the November 2015 Paris attacks, out of concern that ISIL terrorists would enter the United States posing as refugees fleeing Syria.

== Criticism ==
FBI Director James Comey said the SAFE Act "seeks to micromanage the process in a way that is counter-productive to national security, to our humanitarian obligation, and the overall ability to focus on Homeland Security".

Vice-President of the European Commission Federica Mogherini pointed out that the Paris attackers were EU citizens, not Syrian refugees.

Barack Obama threatened to veto the legislation if passed.
