= 2010 California State Controller election =

- November 2, 2010
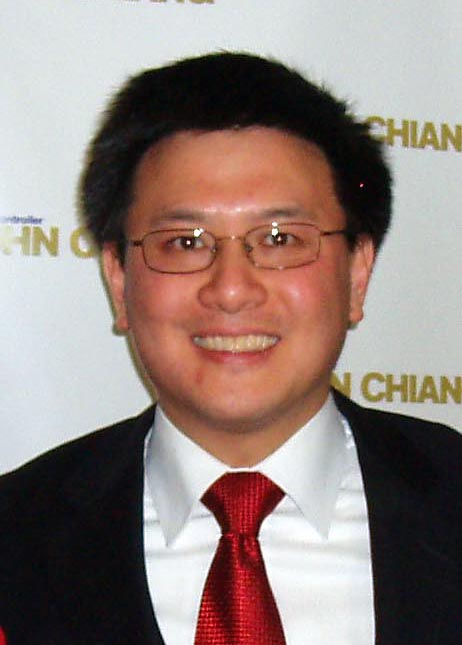

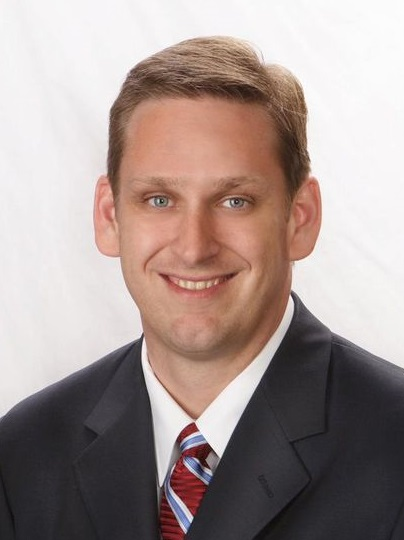
| Nominee | John Chiang | Tony Strickland |
| Party | Democratic | Republican |
| Popular vote | 5,325,357 | 3,487,014 |
| Percentage | 55.13% | 36.10% |
- Chiang: 40–50% 50–60% 60–70% 70–80% 80–90% Strickland: 40–50% 50–60%
Controller before election
John Chiang
Democratic
Elected Controller
John Chiang
Democratic

The 2010 California State Controller election was held on November 2, 2010, to choose the State Controller of California. The primary election was held on June 8, 2010. Incumbent John Chiang won reelection.

== Candidates ==
The following were certified by the California Secretary of State as candidates in the primary election for State Controller. Candidates who won their respective primaries and qualified for the general election are shown in bold.

=== American Independent ===
- **Lawrence Beliz**, businessman
- Nathan Johnson

=== Democratic ===
- **John Chiang**, incumbent State Controller

=== Green ===
- **Ross D. Frankel**, accountant

=== Libertarian ===
- **Andrew "Andy" Favor**, certified public accountant

=== Peace and Freedom ===
- **Karen Martinez**

=== Republican ===
- **David Evans**, certified public accountant
- **Tony Strickland**, state senator and nominee in 2006

== Primary results ==
=== American Independent ===
California American Independent State Controller primary, 2010
| Candidate | Votes | % |
|---|---|---|
| Lawrence Beliz | **24,436** | **56.3** |
| Nathan Johnson | 18,977 | 43.7 |
| Total votes | **43,413** | **100.0** |
| Turnout | {{{votes}}} | % |

=== Republican ===
California Republican State Controller primary, 2010
| Candidate | Votes | % |
|---|---|---|
| Tony Strickland | **1,221,033** | **60.1** |
| David Evans | 812,303 | 39.9 |
| Total votes | **2,033,336** | **100.00** |
| Turnout | {{{votes}}} | % |

=== Others ===
California Secretary of State primary, 2010 (others)
| Party | Candidate | Votes | % |
|---|---|---|---|
| **Democratic** | **John Chiang (incumbent)** | **2,064,419** | **100.0** |
| **Green** | **Ross D. Frankel** | **20,816** | **100.0** |
| **Libertarian** | **Andrew "Andy" Favor** | **18,249** | **100.0** |
| **Peace and Freedom** | **Karen Martinez** | **3,850** | **100.0** |

== General results ==
California State Controller election, 2010
| Party | Candidate | Votes | % | ±% |
|---|---|---|---|---|
| **Democratic** | **John Chiang (incumbent)** | **5,325,357** | **55.13%** | **+4.51%** |
| Republican | Tony Strickland | 3,487,014 | 36.10% | −4.09% |
| Libertarian | Andrew Favor | 292,441 | 3.03% | +0.77% |
| Peace and Freedom | Karen Martinez | 209,638 | 2.17% | −0.37% |
| Green | Ross D. Frankel | 191,282 | 1.98% | −1.13% |
| American Independent | Lawrence G. Beliz | 154,145 | 1.59% | +0.31% |
| Total votes | | **9,659,877** | **100.0%** | |
| Democratic **hold** | | | | |
