= Elizabeth Cervantes Barron =

American politician (1938–2020)

- Born: March 14, 1938; Los Angeles, California, U.S.
- Died: February 10, 2020 (aged 81)
- Occupation: Politician
- Political party: Peace and Freedom
- Children: 3

Elizabeth Cervantes Barron (March 14, 1938 – February 10, 2020) was a frequent candidate for political offices on the Peace and Freedom Party ticket.

== Personal life ==
Cervantes Barron was born in Los Angeles, California, and was the mother of three children.

== Political career ==
Cervantes Barron ran for U.S. Representative from California in 1974. In 1978 she became the party's "all time top vote getter" when she ran for California State Controller, getting 300,000 votes.

In 1980 she ran for United States Vice President as the running mate of Maureen Smith, winning more than 18,000 votes. She ran for United States Senator from California in 1994, winning 255,301 votes, but lost to Dianne Feinstein. She was the Peace and Freedom Party candidate for California State Controller in 2006, receiving 212,383 votes, 2.5% of the total.

Party political offices
Preceded by Benjamin Spock (People's Party)	Peace and Freedom nominee for Vice President of the United States; 1980	Succeeded by Bill Thorn
