= Linda Parks =

American politician

Ventura County Supervisor, Second District
- In office 2003 – 2022

Mayor and Councilmember, Thousand Oaks
- In office 1996–2002

Personal details
- Born: February 21, 1957 (age 69) Los Angeles, California
- Party: Independent
- Spouse: Allan Parks
- Education: California Polytechnic State University; University of Washington
- Website: Campaign Site

Linda Parks (born February 21, 1957) is an American politician who served as the Ventura County, California, Supervisor representing the second district from January 2003 to December 2022. She previously served as the Mayor, Councilmember, and a Planning Commissioner for the City of Thousand Oaks.

== Early life, education, and early career ==
Linda Parks was born in Los Angeles, California at UCLA. Her mother managed a bookstore and her father, Gene Moss, was a writer, actor, and the voice of Smokey Bear. Parks earned her Bachelor of Arts in political science at California Polytechnic State University, San Luis Obispo in 1980. Parks earned her Masters in Urban Planning from the University of Washington 1982.

Parks worked as a transportation planner for private, public and non-profit companies including, Transportation Management Services, Commuter Transportation Service, and the City of Ventura with her transportation planning work included in the 1984 Summer Olympics and the Getty Museum.

Parks began her efforts to preserve the 2,800 acre Ahmanson Ranch from development in 1987 which culminated in the land's purchase by the State of California in 2003.

== Local level political career ==
=== Thousand Oaks Planning Commission ===
She was appointed to the Thousand Oaks Planning Commission in 1993 and cast votes in favor of the Amgen Campus, and the Promenade Shopping Center. During this period she wrote and organized the successful signature drive for the "Parks Initiative" that was made into law in the City of Thousand Oaks protecting city parks and open space by vote of the people. During her tenure, she helped found a hands-on children's museum called the Discovery Center.

=== Thousand Oaks City Council ===
Parks was elected to the City Council in 1996 with the highest number of votes in the city's history. She started a slow-growth movement leading efforts to protect Ahmanson Ranch in unincorporated Ventura County, successfully fighting an effort to put a golf course in Hill Canyon and to preserve the Lang Ranch ancient oak grove in Thousand Oaks. While on the Council, she wrote the City's first campaign finance ordinance.

In 1998 she teamed up with Steve Bennett and Richard Francis to lead the successful initiative drives for SOAR, Save Open-space and Agricultural Resources. SOAR stopped urban sprawl in Ventura County by preserving farmland and open space by vote of the people and voter-approved urban boundaries around eight of Ventura County's ten cities. She is currently the Executive Director of SOAR.

Parks ran for re-election in 2000 with the late Edward Masry, the environmental attorney featured in the movie Erin Brockovich. She again won with the highest numbers of votes in the city's history.

=== Ventura County Board of Supervisors ===
Parks ran for a seat on the Ventura County Board of Supervisors in 2002 while voluntarily limiting her campaign contributions to $500 per person; at that time, there were no limits to the amount of money a candidate could accept. Her opponent, Randy Hoffman, accepted $90,000 from a single developer in the county. Her win helped usher in the County's campaign finance ordinance which put a maximum limit on contributions. When she joined the Board of Supervisors, the County budget was in the red and Supervisor Parks changed that by ensuring Ventura County doesn't spend what it doesn't have by establishing a policy to grow reserves to 15%.

She successfully established the Santa Rosa Valley Municipal Advisory Council and added synchronized traffic signals to Santa Rosa Valley Road and opened the long-awaited Santa Rosa Valley Park using park bond money.

Parks was re-elected in 2006, established two more Municipal Advisory Councils, one in Somis and one in Casa Conejo, and a Fire Safe Council. She led the way to convert an appointed water and sanitation district to an all-elected body (Triunfo Water and Sanitation District) making it accountable to the ratepayers. Parks began providing a Ventura County Veteran Services office out of her office in Thousand Oaks.

She also led the effort to bring the County's Human Services Agency including employment service assistance to the Under One Roof building owned by Community Conscience in Thousand Oaks. She was key to getting the East County Jail reopened, which kept Thousand Oaks and Simi Valley deputies on their beats instead of having to drive detainees to the jail in Ventura, increasing public safety. She has championed mental health services for the severely mentally ill as a 15-year member of the Ventura County Behavioral Health Advisory Board.

In 2010, Parks ran for re-election and faced termed out Assemblymember Audra Strickland. Despite Parks being a registered Republican at the time, the Ventura County Republican Central Committee funded Strickland's campaign in "member communications" to Republican households, which skirted the County's campaign contribution limit of $700 per person. Despite being substantially outspent, Parks defeated Strickland in a landslide victory, running ahead by more than 20 percentage points, 21,827 votes to 13,789. Following this, the Board revised its campaign finance ordinance to close the "member communications" loophole.

Parks ran unopposed for re-election to Ventura County Supervisor in 2014 and 2018.

Parks’ accomplishments as a Supervisor include establishing a Mental Health and Safety Task Force in the wake of the Borderline mass shooting in Thousand Oaks. The report brought forward several recommendations for enhancing services and safety protocols. Other accomplishments include organizing several county-wide Senior Summits to plan for the growing senior adult population. She brought funding for job training programs, therapeutic services for disabled youth, increased access to services for veterans, and established a jail task force that reduced recidivism for people with mental illness. In 2018, she started Growing Works, an innovative drought tolerant plant nursery providing job training, employment, and horticultural therapy to people with mental health challenges. She has also taken a leadership role in providing transportation alternatives that have reduced congested roadways, including leading the effort to help college students with free bus fare, and started the Kanan Shuttle, a free popular bus route with students and residents in Oak Park. Along with Thousand Oaks Councilmember Claudia Bill-de la Peña, she co-chaired of the Santa Monica Mountains Bicycle Tourism Roundtable that led to a bike lane she championed installed on Potrero Road in Hidden Valley that she was able to name in honor of Michael P. Nosco. She organized a 'Unity in the Community' event to promote peace, respect, and acceptance in response to anti-Semitic graffiti and hate messages found in Oak Park, Agoura Hills and Newbury Park.

She fought to protect the public from harmful pollutants and developed County guidelines that require testing water and soil near the contaminated Boeing Santa Susana Field Laboratory (aka Rocketdyne). She opposed a federal proposal for new off-shore drilling. As a member of the Santa Monica Mountains Conservancy, she was part of the effort to bring a wildlife bridge at Liberty Canyon called the Wallis Annenberg Wildlife Crossing. She established a policy to eliminate the use of anticoagulant rodenticides by the County because they harm non-targeted wildlife. In early 2019, she initiated a first of its kind wildlife corridor overlay zone that was added into Ventura County's General Plan to protect major linkages for wildlife migration. Parks set a goal to plant two million trees in unincorporated areas by 2040, with the County of Ventura planting 1,000 trees a year. She also was Vice Chair of the Clean Power Alliance and led it to have the most 100% clean energy customers in the nation. Supervisor Parks also helped establish the largest buffer in the nation between oil wells and schools.

She has won numerous awards, including the national Small Business Administration's Phoenix Award for Outstanding Contributions to Disaster Recovery by a Public Official for her work helping recovery after the Woolsey Fire, and the Ventura County District Attorney's Justice for Victim's Assistance Award for her assistance to victims and families devastated by the tragic Borderline Bar and Grill mass shooting.

The "Linda Parks Courtyard" at Ahmanson Ranch (aka Upper Las Virgenes Open Space Preserve) has been named in her honor by the Santa Monica Mountains Conservancy, and "Linda Parks Park" has been named in her honor by the County of Ventura for her efforts to bring the park, Growing Works, and housing and treatment for people with mental illness to the 1736 S. Lewis Rd County property in Camarillo, California.

== 2012 Congressional Election ==
Parks launched her campaign for the newly redrawn California's 26th congressional district in January 2012, following the announcement that Republican Congressman Elton Gallegly would not seek re-election. With the open primary, where the top two candidates advance to the November elections regardless of political party affiliation, Parks re-registered as 'no party preference' to be independent of the polarizing political parties. The Los Angeles Times endorsed Linda Parks over the other 5 candidates running for the 26th California Congressional District. Though she won the popular vote in her 2nd Supervisorial District and received over 18% of the vote, she lost in the larger 26th Congressional District.

Parks has the distinction of having had hundreds of thousands of dollars spent in campaigns against her by both parties, the Republican Party in 2010 and the Democratic Party in 2012. She termed out from the Board of Supervisors December 30, 2022.
