= 2010 California elections =

November 2010 California elections
- November 2, 2010
- Registered: 17,285,883
- Turnout: 59.59% (▼19.83 pp)

Elections were held in California on November 2, 2010.

On a year marked by a strong Republican wave nationwide, the State of California elected Democrats to the state's top offices of Governor, Lieutenant Governor, State Controller, State Treasurer, Superintendent of Public Education, Insurance Commissioner and United States Senator. On November 24, 2010, the California Democratic Party set a record for winning every statewide elected office in California in a single election when the last outstanding race - the one for Attorney General - was decided in Kamala Harris's favor. Because fellow Democrat Dianne Feinstein holds the other Senate seat that was not up for election in 2010, the Democrats held every statewide elected office in California beginning in 2011.

== United States Senate ==
Results by county Boxer: 40–50%; 50–60%; 60–70%; 70–80%; Fiorina: 40–50%; 50–60%; 60–70%; 70–80%

United States Senate election in California, 2010
Party	Candidate	Votes	%
Democratic	Barbara Boxer (incumbent)	5,218,441	52.2
Republican	Carly Fiorina	4,217,366	42.2
Libertarian	Gail Lightfoot	175,242	1.8
Peace and Freedom	Marsha Feinland	135,093	1.4
Green	Duane Roberts	128,510	1.2
American Independent	Edward Noonan	125,441	1.2
Independent	James E. Harris (write-in)	41	0.0
Independent	Connor Vlakancic (write-in)	11	0.0
Independent	Jerry Leon Carroll (write-in)	10	0.0
Independent	Hans J. Kugler (write-in)	5	0.0
Total votes		10,000,160	100.0
Democratic hold			

== United States House of Representatives ==
Results map Democratic hold Republican hold

United States House of Representatives elections in California, 2010
Party	Votes	Percentage	Seats	+/–
Democratic	5,137,507	53.4%	34	0
Republican	4,182,957	43.4%	19	0
Others	307,857	3.2%	0	0
Valid votes	9,628,321			
Invalid or blank votes				
Totals		100.0%	53	0
Voter turnout				

== Constitutional officers ==
=== Governor ===
Results by county Brown: 40–50%; 50–60%; 60–70%; 70–80%; Whitman: 40–50%; 50–60%; 60–70%

2010 California gubernatorial election
Party	Candidate	Votes	%
Democratic	Jerry Brown	5,417,731	53.8
Republican	Meg Whitman	4,120,020	40.9
American Independent	Chelene Nightingale	165,928	1.7
Libertarian	Dale Ogden	150,547	1.5
Green	Laura Wells	128,419	1.3
Peace and Freedom	Carlos Alvarez	92,637	0.9
Libertarian	Cassandra Lieurance (write-in)	285	0.0
Independent	Lea Sherman (write-in)	43	0.0
Independent	Rakesh K. Christian (write-in)	13	0.0
Democratic	Nadia B. Smalley (write-in)	8	0.0
Independent	Hugh Bagley (write-in)	4	0.0
Independent	Rowan Millar (write-in)	4	0.0
Independent	Jacob Vangelisti (write-in)	4	0.0
Democratic	Anselmo Chavez (write-in)	2	0.0
Total votes		10,075,645	100.0
Democratic gain from Republican			

=== Lieutenant Governor ===
Results by county Newsom: 40–50%; 50–60%; 60–70%; 70–80%; Maldonado: 40–50%; 50–60%; 60–70%

2010 California lieutenant governor election
Party	Candidate	Votes	%
Democratic	Gavin Newsom	4,918,158	50.2
Republican	Abel Maldonado (incumbent)	3,820,977	39.0
Libertarian	Pamela Brown	574,640	5.9
American Independent	Jim King	184,899	1.9
Green	James Castillo	163,987	1.6
Peace and Freedom	C. T. Weber	116,350	1.1
Independent	Karen England (write-in)	34,119	0.3
Total votes		9,813,130	100.0
Democratic gain from Republican			

=== Secretary of State ===
Results by county Bowen: 40–50%; 50–60%; 60–70%; 70–80%; Dunn: 40–50%; 50–60%; 60–70%

2010 California Secretary of State election
Party	Candidate	Votes	%
Democratic	Debra Bowen (incumbent)	5,105,600	53.2
Republican	Damon Dunn	3,666,397	38.2
Green	Ann Menasche	286,701	3.0
Libertarian	Christina Tobin	214,353	2.3
Peace and Freedom	Marylou Cabral	164,458	1.7
American Independent	Merton D. Short	162,100	1.6
Total votes		9,599,609	100.0
Democratic hold			

=== State Controller ===
Results by county Chiang: 40–50%; 50–60%; 60–70%; 70–80%; Strickland: 40–50%; 50–60%

2010 California State Controller election
Party	Candidate	Votes	%
Democratic	John Chiang (incumbent)	5,325,657	55.2
Republican	Tony Strickland	3,487,007	36.1
Libertarian	Andrew "Andy" Favor	292,440	3.1
Peace and Freedom	Karen Martinez	209,647	2.2
Green	Ross D. Frankel	191,284	1.9
American Independent	Lawrence G. Beliz	154,147	1.5
Total votes		9,660,182	100.0
Democratic hold			

=== State Treasurer ===
Results by county Lockyer: 40–50%; 50–60%; 60–70%; 70–80%; Walters: 40–50%; 50–60%; 60–70%

2010 California State Treasurer election
Party	Candidate	Votes	%
Democratic	Bill Lockyer (incumbent)	5,433,508	56.5
Republican	Mimi Walters	3,479,712	36.2
Green	Charles "Kit" Crittenden	231,165	2.4
Libertarian	Edward M. Teyssier	218,387	2.2
American Independent	Robert Lauten	135,930	1.4
Peace and Freedom	Debra L. Reiger	125,573	1.3
Total votes		9,624,275	100.0
Democratic hold			

=== Attorney General ===
Results by county Harris: 40–50%; 50–60%; 60–70%; 70–80%; Cooley: 40–50%; 50–60%; 60–70%

2010 California Attorney General election
Party	Candidate	Votes	%
Democratic	Kamala Harris	4,443,070	46.1
Republican	Steve Cooley	4,368,617	45.3
Green	Peter Allen	258,880	2.7
Libertarian	Timothy Hannan	246,584	2.6
American Independent	Diane Templin	169,994	1.7
Peace and Freedom	Robert Evans	160,426	1.6
Total votes		9,647,571	100.0
Democratic hold			

=== Insurance Commissioner ===
Results by county Jones: 40–50%; 50–60%; 60–70%; 70–80%; Villines: 40–50%; 50–60%; 60–70%

2010 California Insurance Commissioner election
Party	Candidate	Votes	%
Democratic	Dave Jones	4,765,693	50.6
Republican	Mike Villines	3,540,610	37.6
Libertarian	Richard Bronstein	372,684	4.0
Peace and Freedom	Dina Padilla	293,512	3.1
Green	William Balderston	252,305	2.6
American Independent	Clay Pedersen	198,352	2.1
Total votes		9,423,156	100.0
Democratic gain from Republican			

=== Superintendent of Public Instruction ===
Results by county Torlakson: 40–50%; 50–60%; 60–70%; Villines: 40–50%; 50–60%; 60–70%

2010 California Superintendent of Public Instruction election
Party	Candidate	Votes	%
Nonpartisan	Tom Torlakson	4,223,116	54.6
Nonpartisan	Larry Aceves	3,476,288	44.9
Nonpartisan	Diane Lenning (write-in)	46,061	0.5
Total votes		7,745,465	100.0
Nonpartisan hold			

== Board of Equalization ==
=== District 1 ===
California's 1st Board of Equalization district election, 2010
Party	Candidate	Votes	%
Democratic	Betty T. Yee (incumbent)	1,617,655	63.1
Republican	Kevin R. Scott	799,316	31.2
Libertarian	Kennita Watson	77,942	3.0
Peace and Freedom	Sherrill Borg	71,189	2.7
Total votes		2,566,102	100.0
Democratic hold			

=== District 2 ===
California's 2nd Board of Equalization district election, 2010
Party	Candidate	Votes	%
Republican	George Runner	1,189,504	50.0
Democratic	Chris Parker	1,019,844	42.9
Libertarian	Willard D. Michlin	112,825	4.7
Peace and Freedom	Toby Mitchell-Sawyer	58,242	2.4
Total votes		2,380,415	100.0
Republican hold			

=== District 3 ===
California's 3rd Board of Equalization district election, 2010
Party	Candidate	Votes	%
Republican	Michelle Steel (incumbent)	1,325,538	54.9
Democratic	Mary Christian Heising	836,057	34.6
Libertarian	Jerry L. Dixon	117,783	4.8
Peace and Freedom	Mary Lou Finley	79,870	3.3
American Independent	Terri Lussenheide	59,513	2.4
Total votes		2,418,761	100.0
Republican hold			

=== District 4 ===
California's 4th Board of Equalization district election, 2010
Party	Candidate	Votes	%
Democratic	Jerome Horton (incumbent)	1,223,906	71.8
American Independent	Shawn Hoffman	215,639	12.6
Libertarian	Peter "Pedro" De Baets	198,575	11.6
Peace and Freedom	Nancy Lawrence	68,577	4.0
Total votes		1,706,697	100.0
Democratic hold			

== Supreme Court ==
Three justices on the Supreme Court of California faced retention in 2010.

=== Justice Cantil-Sakauye retention ===
Retention results by county For: 50–60%; 60–70%; 70–80%; Against: 50–60%

Chief Justice Tani Cantil-Sakauye was appointed by Governor Arnold Schwarzenegger in July 2010 to succeed Ron George.

2010 California Supreme Court Chief Justice Cantil-Sakauye retention
Choice	Votes	%
For	4,772,376	67.05
Against	2,345,611	32.95
Total	7,117,987	100.00
Source: California Secretary of State

=== Justice Chin retention ===
Retention results by county For: 50–60%; 60–70%; 70–80%; Against: 50–60%

Justice Ming Chin was first appointed by Governor Pete Wilson in 1996 to succeed Armand Arabian.

2010 California Supreme Court Justice Chin retention
Choice	Votes	%
For	4,599,967	65.46
Against	2,427,421	34.54
Total	7,027,388	100.00
Source: California Secretary of State

=== Justice Moreno retention ===
Retention results by county For: 50–60%; 60–70%; 70–80%; 80–90%; Against: 50–60%

Justice Carlos Moreno was appointed by Governor Gray Davis in 2001 to succeed Stanley Mosk.

2010 California Supreme Court Justice Moreno retention
Choice	Votes	%
For	4,747,050	67.72
Against	2,262,825	32.28
Total	7,009,875	100.00
Source: California Secretary of State

== State Senate ==
There are 40 seats in the State Senate, the upper house of California's bicameral State Legislature. Voters in the 20 even-numbered districts of the California State Senate will vote for their representatives.

California State Senate elections, 2010
Party	Votes	Percentage	Not up	Incumbents	Open	Before	After
Democratic	2,269,550	55.6	11	9	5	25	25
Republican	1,728,863	42.3	9	1	5	15	15
Libertarian	64,163	1.6	0	0	0	0	0
Green	11,871	0.3	0	0	0	0	0
Peace and Freedom	10,209	0.2	0	0	0	0	0
Independent	10	0.0	0	0	0	0	0
Totals	4,084,666	100.0	20	10	10	40	40

== State Assembly ==
Voters in all 80 of California's State Assembly districts voted for their representatives.

California State Assembly elections, 2010
Party	Votes	Percentage	Seats	+/–
Democratic	5,024,759	54.0	52	+2
Republican	4,084,979	43.9	28	-1
Libertarian	115,709	1.2	0	0
Green	46,599	0.5	0	0
Peace and Freedom	26,809	0.3	0	0
American Independent	4,269	0.1	0	0
Independent	163	0.0	0	-1
Invalid or blank votes			—	—
Valid votes	9,303,287		—	—
Totals		100.0%	80	—
Voter turnout				

== Statewide ballot propositions ==
The following propositions have been approved for the November ballot either through referral by the state legislature or by obtaining 433,971 signatures for proposed statutes and 694,354 signatures for constitutional amendments.

2010 California ballot propositions
Name	Description	Votes				Type
Name	Description	Yes	%	No	%	Type
Proposition 19	Legalizes recreational marijuana for individuals 21 years of age and older and allow local governments to regulate and tax it.	4,643,592	46.54	5,333,230	53.46	Citizen-initiated state statute
Proposition 20	Transfers the power of congressional redistricting from the California State Legislature and the governor to the California Citizens Redistricting Commission.	5,743,069	61.23	3,636,892	38.77	Citizen-initiated constitutional amendment
Proposition 21	Creates an $18 surcharge to vehicle registration fees and dedicating revenue from the surcharge to state parks and wildlife programs.	4,190,643	42.73	5,615,595	57.27	Citizen-initiated state statute
Proposition 22	Prohibits the state from redirecting property tax revenues from local jurisdictions and using fuel tax revenue to pay for transportation bonds, even in the case of a fiscal emergency.	5,733,755	60.62	3,725,014	39.38	Citizen-initiated constitutional amendment
Proposition 23	Freezes the provisions of Assembly Bill 32 (2006) until California's unemployment rate drops to 5.5% or below for four consecutive quarters.	3,733,883	38.46	5,974,564	61.54	Citizen-initiated state statute
Proposition 24	Repeals three business tax breaks passed by the state legislature as part of negotiations of the 2008–10 California budget crisis.	3,947,502	41.91	5,470,477	58.09	Citizen-initiated state statute
Proposition 25	Changes the requirement to pass the state budget from two-thirds to a simple majority vote of the legislature.	5,262,052	55.07	4,292,648	44.93	Citizen-initiated constitutional amendment
Proposition 26	Increases the vote requirement needed to impose certain new taxes and fees by the state legislature and local governments from a simple majority to a two-thirds supermajority vote.	4,923,834	52.41	4,470,234	47.59	Citizen-initiated constitutional amendment
Proposition 27	Repeals Proposition 11 (2008), which authorized the creation of the California Citizens Redistricting Commission.	3,736,443	40.59	5,468,703	59.41	Combined initiated constitutional amendment and state statute
Source: California Secretary of State

Results by county

Amendment 19 results by county
Yes:
- 50–60%
- 60–70%
No:
- 50–60%
- 60–70%

Amendment 20 results by county
Yes:
- 50–60%
- 60–70%
- 70–80%
No:
- 50–60%

Amendment 21 results by county
Yes:
- 50–60%
- 60–70%
No:
- 50–60%
- 60–70%
- 70–80%
- 80–90%

Amendment 22 results by county
Yes:
- 50–60%
- 60–70%
- 70–80%
No:
- 50–60%

Amendment 23 results by county
Yes:
- 50–60%
- 60–70%
No:
- 50–60%
- 60–70%
- 70–80%
- 80–90%

Amendment 24 results by county
Yes:
- 50–60%
No:
- 50–60%
- 60–70%
- 70–80%

Amendment 25 results by county
Yes:
- 50–60%
- 60–70%
- 70–80%
No:
- 50–60%
- 60–70%

Amendment 26 results by county
Yes:
- 50–60%
- 60–70%
No:
- 50–60%
- 60–70%

Amendment 27 results by county
Yes:
- 50–60%
No:
- 50–60%
- 60–70%
- 70–80%

=== Not on the ballot ===
- Proposition 18

This was a legislatively referred state statute that sought to authorize an $11.1 billion bond to upgrade California's water system. On August 9, 2010, the California Legislature postponed the vote on the proposition until 2012.

== See also ==
- 2010 California gubernatorial election
- List of California ballot propositions
- June 2010 California state elections
- Political party strength in U.S. states
- Political party strength in California
- Elections in California
- Districts in California
