= Haim Saban =

Israeli and American media proprietor, investor (born 1944)

- חיים סבן
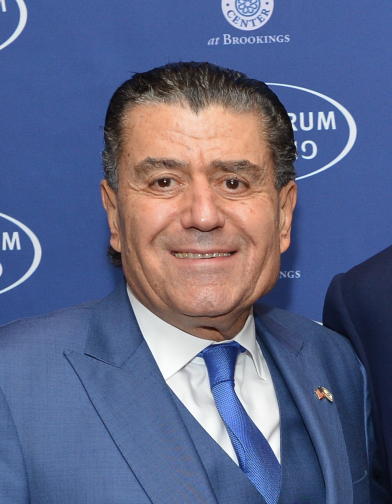
- Saban in December 2013
- Born: October 15, 1944 (age 81); Alexandria, Egypt
- Citizenship: Israel, United States
- Occupations: Businessman, investor; record, film and television producer; CEO of Saban Capital Group
- Political party: Democratic
- Spouse: Cheryl Flor (m. 1987)
- Children: 4
- Website: saban.com

Haim Saban (/səˈbɑːn/; Hebrew: חיים סבן; born October 15, 1944) is an Israeli-American media proprietor, investor, musical composer and producer of records, film, and television. A businessman with interests in financial services, entertainment, and media, he has an estimated net worth of $3.3 billion. Saban is the founder of Saban Entertainment, producer and distributor of children's television programs in the US such as Power Rangers. He headed up consortiums which purchased the broadcasters ProSiebenSat.1 Media and Univision Communications. He is a major donor to the United States Democratic Party and active in pro-Israel political efforts in the United States. In March 2017, Saban was honored with the 2,605th star on the Hollywood Walk of Fame for his achievements in television.

== Early and personal life ==
Haim Saban was born in Alexandria, Egypt, to an Egyptian-Jewish family. In 1956, the Saban family immigrated to Israel, along with most of the Egyptian Jewish community. Saban was sent to a Youth Aliyah boarding school. Expelled for being a troublemaker, he enrolled in a night high school where the principal told him: "You're not cut out for academic studies; you're cut out for making money." He served as a soldier in the Israel Defense Forces.

Saban is married to Cheryl Lynn (Flor) Saban, with whom he has two children. He also has two stepchildren, Tifanie and Heidi Lenhart, an actress. He resides in Beverly Hills, California.

== Music career ==
Saban started his music career in 1966 as a bass player and manager with the rock band The Lions of Judah (Ha'arayot), which was named after the Lion of Judah in Jewish Scripture. Saban did not know how to play the bass but conditioned his work booking the band's performances on becoming their bassist. In 1969, Dave Watts from the British band The Tornados joined The Lions. That year, the band traveled to England, performed in night clubs in London and was signed up by Polydor Records. In July 1969, the band appeared on the BBC TV programme Colour Me Pop. The Lions recorded a single, "Our Love's A Growing Thing", but it was not released in the UK due to financial difficulties. The band returned to Israel and Saban focused on being a music promoter.

In Israel, Saban worked as a tour promoter but found himself deep in debt due to financial losses during the Yom Kippur War. He discovered a young Noam Kaniel and took him to Paris, where Saban produced a string of Kaniel's singles and albums. In 1978, Kaniel recorded the theme for Goldorak, the French-dubbed version of UFO Robot Grendizer, the first anime to be telecast in France. This led to Saban's involvement in American cartoon music.

After moving in 1983 to the United States, Haim Saban and partner Shuki Levy became known for soundtrack compositions for children's television programs of the 1980s. Although Levy and Saban composed for their own properties (such as Kidd Video and Maple Town), they scored for other production companies as well (such as Inspector Gadget, The Mysterious Cities of Gold, M.A.S.K., Dinosaucers, Dragon Quest, He-Man and the Masters of the Universe, She-Ra: Princess of Power, and Jayce and the Wheeled Warriors).

In 1998, The Hollywood Reporter reported that he did not actually compose all the music (totalling 3,700 works in 2008) he is credited for; ten composers threatened to sue and Saban settled out of court.

== Business career ==
=== Saban Entertainment ===
He then became a television producer, founding Saban Entertainment in 1988. In the 1990s, Saban's company became known for the production of Power Rangers, Masked Rider, VR Troopers, and Big Bad Beetleborgs, which were Western adaptations of Japanese tokusatsu shows.

=== Fox Family ===
In 1996, News Corporation's Fox Children's Network and Haim Saban's Saban Entertainment merged to form Fox Kids Worldwide. Also in that year, the company purchased the C&D library from Jean Chalopin.

With the growing shift in children's television from over-the-air programming blocks to cable channels such as Cartoon Network and Nickelodeon, the combined entity (half-owned by Haim Saban himself) sought to launch a competitor that would carry programming from the popular Fox Kids lineup. Eying The Family Channel, News Corp. made an offer to purchase IFE through the Fox Kids Worldwide division in 1997.

On July 23, 2001, Saban announced that he and News Corporation would sell Fox Family Worldwide Inc for $5.3 billion to The Walt Disney Company. and on October 24, 2001, the sale was completed and the network was renamed ABC Family. Saban profited about $1.6 billion from this sale.

=== ProSiebenSat.1 ===
In August 2003, Saban led a consortium, which acquired a controlling stake in the straggling ProSiebenSat.1 Media group from the Kirch Media Group, the then-bankrupt German media conglomerate.

ProSiebenSat.1, is Germany's largest commercial television broadcasting company, which owns five German TV channels, including ProSieben and SAT.1, two of the top three stations in Germany. Collectively, ProSiebenSat.1's channels represented approximately 45% of the German TV advertising market at the time. Saban's ProSiebenSat.1 acquisition was the first time a foreigner took control of a significant German Media company.

Saban oversaw a successful business turnaround of ProSiebenSat.1, recruiting former business rivals, ex-BSkyB chief executive Tony Ball and former BBC Director-General Greg Dyke to the board of the company.

In March 2007, Saban Capital Group and the consortium sold its controlling interest in ProSiebenSat.1 to KKR and Permira, for 22.40 euros a share after originally paying 7.5 euros per share in 2003.

=== Univision ===
On June 27, 2006, Saban Capital Group led a group of investors bidding for Univision Communications, the largest Spanish-language media company in the United States. Other investors in the Saban-led group were Texas Pacific Group of Fort Worth, Texas and Thomas H. Lee Partners. The group was successful in acquiring Univision with a bid valued at $13.7 billion (USD), but sold to private equity firm Searchlight Capital Partners and ex-Viacom finance head Wade Davis in 2020.

=== Saban Music Group ===
In 2019, Saban announced that he had formed the Saban Music Group backed by $500 million of his own capital. The company will focus on global artists, particular Latin American, tapping new artists and acquiring existing businesses.

== Views and opinions ==
Saban, a long-time supporter and donor of many Jewish and pro-Israel causes, has stated his main goal in multiple interviews: "I'm a one-issue guy, and my issue is Israel."

Saban became involved in politics in the mid-1990s when he felt that support for Israel was slipping in the United States. He says his views have shifted over the years:

I used to be a real leftist. I remember Arik Sharon [the leader of Israel's right-wing Likud Party] coming here, to my house, a few months before Camp David, when he was still leader of the opposition. He told me there would be no deal because [Yassir] Arafat would not sign. I told myself that there was nothing to be done—these right-wingers were simply insane. I had no doubt that there would be a deal and the problems would be resolved. History proved that Sharon was right and I was wrong. In matters relating to security, that moved me to the right. Very far to the right...When there is a terrorist attack, I am [Avigdor] Lieberman. Sometimes to the right of Lieberman. For two days I really love Lieberman. But afterward I come back to reality. Look, I don't see a solution today.

Saban has been a consistent donor to the United States Democratic Party according to his mandatory Federal Election Commission filings. Mother Jones, in an analysis of the major donors to the campaigns of 1998 election cycle, ranked Saban 155th among individual donors. Amy Paris noted that Saban's Clinton-era "generosity did not go unrewarded. During the Clinton administration, the entertainment executive served on the President's Export Council, advising the White House on trade issues." The New York Times reported that Haim and his wife "slept in the White House several times during President Clinton's two terms." Saban remains close friends with the former president. Clinton described Saban as a "very good friend and supporter." Saban contributed between $5 million to $10 million to the William J. Clinton Foundation.

During the 2000 presidential election, Saban increased his rank to 5th among individual donors with a combined contribution of $1,250,500. Matthew Yglesias wrote that "Saban was the largest overall contributor to the Democratic National Committee during the 2001–2002 cycle." Saban's donations during that 2001–2002 period exceeded $10 million, the largest donation the DNC has received from a single source up to that time.

In September 2004, Hillary Clinton described Saban as a very good friend, supporter and adviser: "I am grateful for his commitment to Israel, to a just and lasting peace in the Middle East and to my foundation's work, particularly on reconciliation issues." In May 2007, Haim publicly declared his support for Clinton in 2008 presidential election. In June 2007, Saban and Steven Spielberg co-hosted a Hillary Clinton fundraiser at the house of Peter Chernin, the president of News Corporation. According to the Los Angeles Times, the fundraiser brought in over $850,000.

In March 2008, Saban was among a group of major Jewish donors to sign a letter to Democratic Party house leader Nancy Pelosi advising her not to "interfere" in the Democratic presidential primaries. The donors were upset by Pelosi's statement that the party "superdelegates" should heed the will of the majority in selecting a candidate. The donors, who were strong supporters of the DCCC, implied that Pelosi risked losing their financial support in upcoming congressional elections.

In May 2008, it was reported that Haim Saban had offered $1 million to the Young Democrats of America and urged the endorsement of Hillary Clinton as the Democratic nominee for president."

Saban has also made donations to members of the Republican Party including a 2003 contribution to George W. Bush's 2004 re-election campaign.

Saban supported Hillary Clinton for President of the United States in the 2016 U.S. presidential election. Between June 2015 and June 2016, he and his wife donated US$7 million to Priorities USA, a pro-Clinton Super PAC. Saban called Republican candidate Donald Trump "a danger to America".

Saban has said that Keith Ellison, who ran for the leadership of the DNC, "is clearly an anti-Semite and anti-Israel individual." Saban also called Sen. Bernie Sanders (I-VT) "an anti-Israel person."

In 2006, Saban discussed his views on the Middle East and Persian Gulf region in an interview with Haaretz. Commenting on Iran, he said: "When I see Ahmadinejad, I see Hitler. They speak the same language. His motivation is also clear: the return of the Mahdi is a supreme goal. And for a religious person of deep self-persuasion, that supreme goal is worth the liquidation of five and a half million Jews. We cannot allow ourselves that. Nuclear weapons in the hands of a religious leadership that is convinced that the annihilation of Israel will bring about the emergence of a new Muslim caliphate? Israel cannot allow that. This is no game. It's truly an existential danger." At a meeting of the Israeli American Council, he said that if Obama were to strike a "bad deal" with Iran that would put Israel at risk, "I would bomb the living daylights out of these sons of bitches".

In 2005, Saban spent $100,000 to oppose California's 2005 Proposition 77 redistricting reform. Saban contributed $100,000 to pass California's 2008 redistricting reform, Proposition 11, which created a Citizens Redistricting Commission to redraw California's state political boundaries, but not U.S. Congressional districts. Saban contributed $2,000,000 to support Proposition 27, California's proposed 2010 repeal of Proposition 11, the 2008 redistricting reform – the same reform that Haim Saban previously supported with a $100,000 contribution. He joined list of other well-connected, big-money donors to the Democratic Party in supporting Proposition 27.

In 2020, Saban and UAE Ambassador to the United States, Yousef Al Otaiba, collaborated on an op-ed, published June 12 on the front page of Yedioth Ahronoth, addressed to the Israeli public in an effort to halt Israel's planned annexation of parts of the West Bank and create a unified front between the UAE and Israel against the opposing forces of Iran. Al Otaiba credited Saban with advising him where his op-ed should be placed, when it should be placed and that it needed to be translated in Hebrew. The efforts were purported to have helped pave the way to the August 2020 signing of the Abraham Accords, brokered by United States President, Donald Trump, and normalizing ties between Israel and UAE.

In 2024, Saban criticized the Biden administration in an email to them after Biden proposed halting a weapons shipment to Israel during the Gaza war before the Rafah offensive, saying, "Let's not forget there are more Jewish voters who care about Israel than Muslim voters who care about Hamas".

== Philanthropy ==
In 2007, Saban donated $14 million to complete the children's hospital at Soroka Medical Center.

== Other donations ==
=== Saban Center for Middle East Policy ===
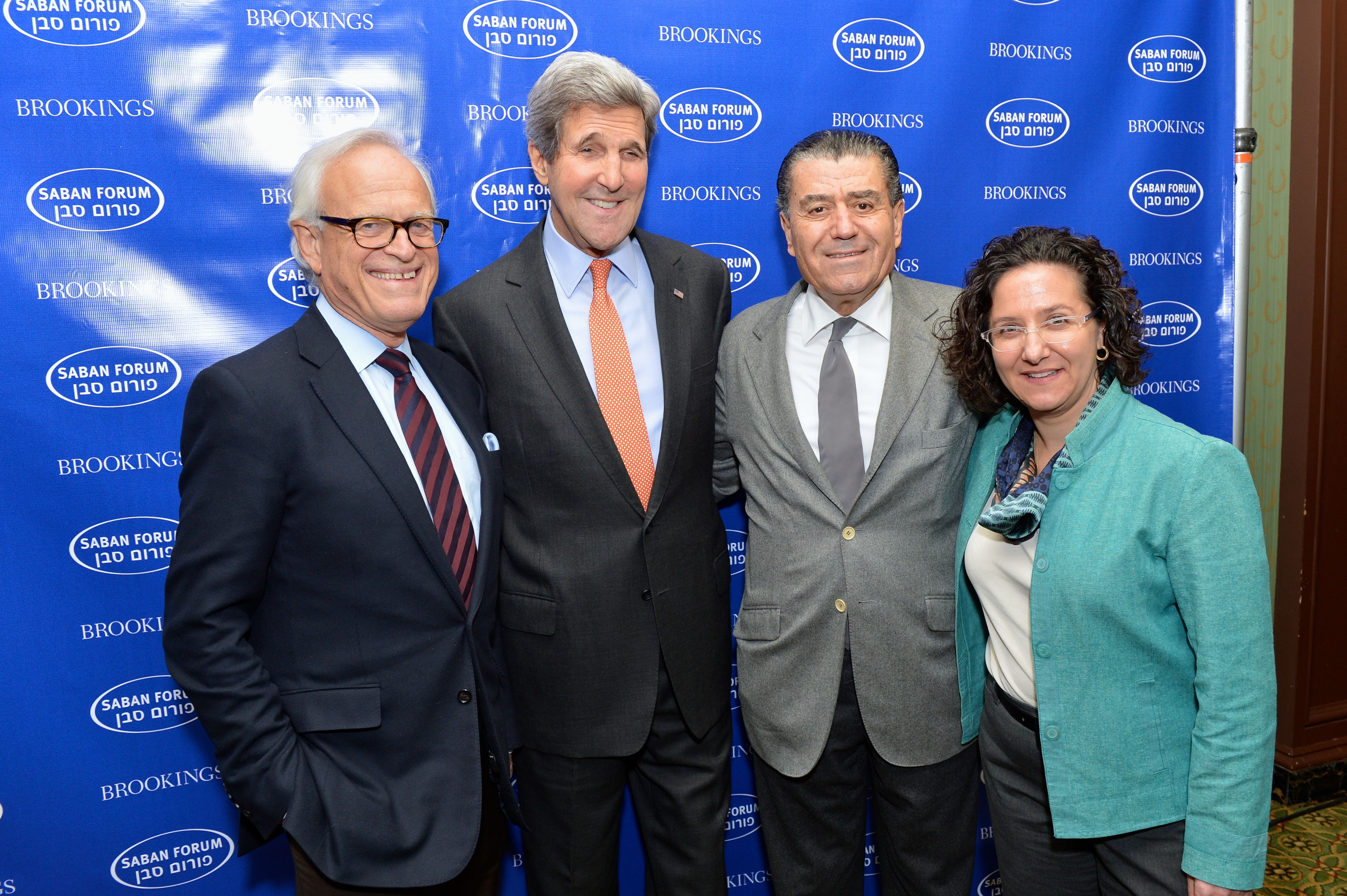
Saban with U.S. Secretary of State John Kerry and Martin Indyk, Washington, D.C., December 7, 2014

In 2002 Saban provided an initial grant of US$13 million and a pledge of additional funds to create the Saban Center for Middle East Policy, a foreign policy think tank based in Washington, D.C. The Saban Center is part of the larger Brookings Institution think tank. The Saban Center aims to provide policy makers in government with information and analysis regarding America's foreign policy in the Middle East. Saban recruited Martin Indyk to direct the center.

=== Saban National Political Leadership Training Seminar ===
Saban sponsors the American-Israel Public Affairs Committee's Saban National Political Leadership Training Seminar, a series of semiannual seminars in Washington to provide college student activists for three days of intensive pro-Israel advocacy training. The seminars provide up to 300 students from a hundred campuses with training in order to "prepare for challenges and opportunities on their campuses and [the students] left Washington prepared to mobilize for legislative and electoral impact during the next school year and into campaign '08." Among the prominent figures to have addressed the seminars are Senator Evan Bayh and Congressman Mark Kirk and academics David Makovsky, Robert Satloff and Dennis Ross.
