= California State Auditor =

Supreme audit institution of the Government of California

Agency overview
- Formed: 1956; 70 years ago
- Preceding agency: Office of the Auditor General (1956-1992)
- Jurisdiction: Government of California
- Headquarters: 621 Capitol Mall, Sacramento, CA 95814
- Agency executive: Grant Parks, State Auditor
- Parent department: Little Hoover Commission
- Website: auditor.ca.gov

The California State Auditor's Office (CSA), formerly known as the Office of the Auditor General and later the Bureau of State Audits (BSA), is the supreme audit institution of the Government of California. It is headed by the State Auditor who is appointed by the Governor to a 4-year term from a list of 3 qualified individuals submitted by the Joint Legislative Audit Committee of the California State Legislature.

California law requires the bureau to examine and report annually upon the financial statements prepared by the executive branch of the state; perform other related assignments, including performance audits, that are mandated by statute; administer the Reporting of Improper Governmental Activities Act; and conduct audits and investigations of public entities requested by the Joint Legislative Audit Committee to the extent that funding is available.

The auditors investigate whistleblower complaints against state agencies and provides the report to the governor and legislature. The agencies have 60 days to report on any disciplinary and corrective actions they take.

The CSA also helps implement the Citizens Redistricting Commission per California Proposition 11 (2008) and California Proposition 20 (2010), primarily by conducting the commissioner recruitment and selection process, and by assisting each new decennial set of commissioners to become fully functional.

Although the bureau is located within the executive branch, state law grants the CSA independence from executive branch oversight. The bureau is overseen by the Little Hoover Commission, an independent state oversight agency.

== List of California state auditors ==
=== California Auditor General's Office (1956–1992) ===
Name	Took office	Left office
William H. Merrifield	May 17, 1956	November 21, 1972
Harvey M. Rose	1973	1975
John H. Williams	1976	1979
Thomas W. Hayes	1979	1989
Kurt R. Sjoberg (acting)	1989	1992

=== California State Auditor's Office (1993–present) ===
Name	Took office	Left office
Kurt R. Sjoberg	1993	2000
Mary P. Noble (acting)	2000	2000
Elaine Howle	2000	December 31, 2021
Michael Tilden	2021	2023
Grant Parks	January 16, 2023	present
