= Redistricting in California =

Redistricting of California's districts for the U.S. House of Representatives

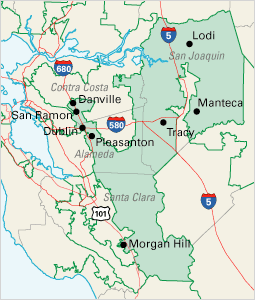
A gerrymandered congressional district, the 11th CD of CA, drawn to favor Republican Richard Pombo. While the Danville area is a traditional Republican stronghold, Morgan Hill is not, and it was added to obtain the proper population numbers for the 11th after Livermore was assigned to the 10th at the behest of the incumbent Democrat, since it contains the Lawrence Livermore National Laboratory (located near the "580" shield) and she sat in the House Energy Committee. The 10th CD is immediately north of the 11 in Contra Costa and Solano Counties See text below and the California's 11th congressional district election, 2006 for an unexpected result that overcame this gerrymander.

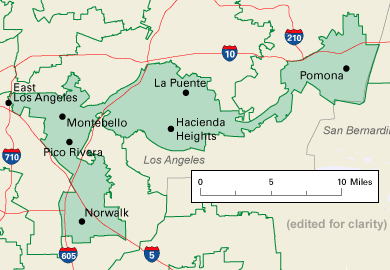
Carved out with the aid of a computer, this congressional district is a product of California's incumbent gerrymandering. This is the district of Democrat Grace Napolitano, who ran unopposed in 2004.

Redistricting in California is the process of redrawing the California State Senate, California Assembly, and federal congressional maps. It is usually done after each decennial census and subsequent reapportionment by the California Citizens Redistricting Commission. California is one of eight states with an independent commission. It was created by voters in 2008 when they passed a proposition to take redistricting power away from the Legislature for state Assembly and Senate districts. In 2010, voters added congressional redistricting to the commission's duties. The commission's makeup is 5 Democrats, 5 Republicans and 4 unaffiliated citizens, chosen from business people, professors, or community leaders.

== History ==
When former Governor Earl Warren mandated one man, one vote by deciding Reynolds v. Sims, the California Senate was badly malapportioned by counties, with the 6 million people in Los Angeles County and the 397 people in Alpine County each represented by one state senator. In 1966 Governor Pat Brown signed a bipartisan gerrymander the state senators had designed to retain as many incumbents as constitutionally possible. The legislature attempted further incumbency protection after the 1970 census, so Governor Ronald Reagan vetoed the bill. With the legislature and governor unable to resolve the impasse, the California Supreme Court ultimately appointed special masters to draw new districts.

=== 1980 census ===
After the 1980 census California became entitled to 45 congressional districts, a growth of two. Democrats controlled both houses of the legislature and the governorship but were feeling vulnerable after former Governor Reagan had won California by a landslide in the 1980 presidential election. Democratic Congressman Phillip Burton and new State Assembly Speaker Willie Brown devised a redistricting plan that would result in five new safe Democratic seats. Congressman Burton would boast that the bizarrely shaped map, which included a 385-sided district, was "My contribution to modern art". Reacting to what was called "one of the most notorious gerrymanders" of the decade, Republicans successfully placed a veto referendum on the primary ballot and California voters overwhelmingly rejected the legislature's redistricting plans in the June 1982 election, the same election that enacted the California Constitution's Victim's Bill of Rights.

A majority of the California Supreme Court justices, however, had been appointed by Governor Jerry Brown and a sharply fractured court ordered the rejected districts to be used in the November election, only because it was "practicable". Democrats won 60% of the congressional seats despite only taking 49.9% of the statewide vote. Democrats still lost the statewide elections, losing the governorship and incumbent Governor Jerry Brown losing his U.S. Senate bid to San Diego Mayor Pete Wilson. Governor Brown responded by calling an extraordinary legislative session, amending a previously passed bill with the redistricting plan that had just been rejected by the electorate, and signing the redistricting plan into law hours before being replaced by Republican George Deukmejian.

=== 1990 census ===
Governor Pete Wilson vetoed the redistricting plan developed by the Democratic legislature after the 1990 census, alleging that it was a partisan gerrymander and would violate the federal Voting Rights Act. Only one of Jerry Brown's chosen Supreme Court justices remained after incensed California voters had removed many of his appointments in recall elections. Governor Wilson asked and the California Supreme Court agreed to appoint special masters to perform the redistricting.

=== 2000 census ===
After the 2000 year census, the legislature was obliged to set new district boundaries, both for the state Assembly and Senate and for federal congressional districts (CDs). The Republican and Democratic parties came to an agreement to gerrymander the boundaries. It was mutually decided that the status quo in terms of balance of power would be preserved. With this goal, districts were assigned to voters in such a way that they were dominated by one or the other party, with few districts that could be considered competitive.

In only a few cases did this require extremely convoluted boundaries, but resulted in preservation of existing strongholds: in the results of the 2004 election, a win by less than 55 percent of the vote was quite rare—only five of eighty Assembly districts, and two of 39 Senate district seats, and no seat was changed in the party of its winner, and neither was any U.S. congressional seat.

=== 2010 census ===
Following the passage of Proposition 11 in 2008, the Independent Redistricting Commission's selection process went underway. After the fourteen members of the commission were chosen, the committee held numerous meetings from February 2011 to January 2012, taking input from citizens representing communities across the state, determining which communities to place in districts. The commission held 34 public input hearings and heard from 2700 speakers, received 245 public appearances by commissioners and over 40,000 public comments and submissions. Mapping lasted throughout the summer of 2011, with drafts released on June 6, 2011. Final maps were released on July 28, 2011, and the commission certified them on August 15 of the same year, putting the maps into effect.

The map had 33 Democratic leaning seats, 14 Republican leaning seats and 6 competitive seats. Democrats ended up flipping four seats in the 2012 United States House of Representatives elections in California.

=== 2020 census ===
After the United States Census Bureau finalized its data and released its reapportionment numbers for the United States House of Representatives, California and six other states were slated to each lose a seat. This was the first time in state history that California lost a seat, as a result of increasingly stagnant population growth.

The Commission did its work under a changed legal landscape. At the Legislature's request to be consistent with new state laws, the Commission reallocated individuals in state prisons to their last known addresses. Also, in prior redistricting cycles, the federal Voting Rights Act required California to seek federal preclearance for redistricting plans affecting several counties, but in 2013, the United States Supreme Court issued a landmark decision rendering a key part of the law unconstitutional. (Shelby County v. Holder) This meant that federal preclearance—which had previously applied to Kings, Merced, Monterey, and Yuba counties—was no longer required.

The Commission held 196 public meetings, including public meetings to solicit information on communities of interest, public meetings to receive feedback on visualizations, and live line-drawing sessions. It also received more than 3,870 verbal comments, input, and suggestions during Commission meetings. The commission also received over 32,410 written comments, input, and suggestions from individuals and groups. Public education and outreach began in October 2020, ending in July 2021 when the commission began mapping. The commission then received datasets, input from locals, and census data in the summer of 2021 and finished its map in December of that year.

The final map resulted in 36 Democratic leaning districts, 11 competitive districts, and 5 Republican districts. Joe Biden won all but seven of California's district in his landslide victory in California, while Gavin Newsom lost fourteen of the same congressional districts in his bid for reelection as California's Governor. House Democrats lost two seats, one of which (the Lake Tahoe-based 3rd) was vacated by incumbent Democrat John Garamendi opting to run in a safer Bay Area district. The other seat lost by Democrats, the 13th, was anchored in Merced and surrounding communities in the Central Valley. Its incumbent, Josh Harder, ran in the Stockton-based 9th district. Republican John Duarte ran for the open seat, clinching the seat by 564 votes against Adam Gray.

In 2024, Gray would enter a rematch against Duarte and end up flipping the 13th by a little over 200 votes. In the 41st, an Asian opportunity seat, incumbent Michelle Steel was unseated by Derek Tran in an upset. Rep. Mike Garcia, was also ousted in the 27th district, a Hispanic-majority seat in northern Los Angeles County. Kamala Harris lost 11 of California's congressional districts in her unsuccessful bid for president.

== Reform attempts ==
Governor Arnold Schwarzenegger proposed placing the redistricting process in the hands of retired judges, which was on the November ballot as an initiative in a special election (called by the Governor on June 14, 2005), Proposition 77. The special election was held on November 8, 2005. However, the initiative was defeated, with 59.5% No votes. All initiatives, including those proposed by the Governor's allies and several independent initiatives, failed.

The United States House of Representatives districts were less competitive than the state districts with only three out of 53 congressional districts being won with less than 60 percent majority.

Considering the 10th CD in the San Francisco Bay Area, in earlier elections the almost evenly divided district was a focus of national attention, owing to its balanced electorate with a slight Republican edge in registration and a Republican advantage in electoral participation. The district had been held since its creation in 1990 by a Republican, Congressman Bill Baker, a former State Assembly member, for whom the district was designed. After several weak challenges to the seat by Democrats, the election was hotly contested in 1996 by a newcomer to politics, Ellen Tauscher, a candidate with sufficient funds of her own to be competitive against the incumbent. Receiving a great amount of grassroots support from local Democratic clubs and votes from moderate Republican women, her defeat of Congressman Baker was considered a great victory for what many consider a "middle of the road" Democrat. Her redrawn district is now "safe" (she won reelection with 75.6 percent of the vote in 2002) and subsequent full-term congressional elections drew no national attention to California.

As desired by the two major parties, in the 2004 elections there was no change of political party in any of the district-elected offices at either the State or Federal level - no member of the State Assembly, State Senator, or U. S. Representative was not of the same party as their predecessor.

Despite the supposed uncertainty for Republican prospects of dominance in the U.S. Congress in the November 2006 elections, no California seats in the House of Representatives were considered to be "in play" by national analysts within several months of the election, although a few Republican-held seats offered at least improved prospects for Democrats during this cycle. Republican Representatives Richard Pombo (11th CA) and John Doolittle (4th CA) each hosted President Bush in October 2006 for fundraisers, a rare event in California (and also rare for Bush in this election cycle) that may have been indicative of perceived insecurities in these seats (these Representatives had strongly supported the Bush Administration).

In an unexpected turn of the 2006 elections in California, Democrat Jerry McNerney, although never having held an elective office, defeated incumbent Republican Richard Pombo, 53% to 47%. In 2004 the same pairing resulted in 62.5% for Pombo. There has been some demographic change in the district in the Pleasanton area, but not sufficient in itself to account for the difference, and the victory is considered by many (given the gerrymander of the district) to be an overwhelming repudiation both of President George W. Bush and of many of the stands taken by Pombo, particularly concerning environmental matters. This district was the sole exception, as none of the remaining 99 federal and state district legislative elections involved a change of party.

Official California preliminary 2006 election returns are available at https://web.archive.org/web/20061109111002/http://www.vote.ss.ca.gov/

A California constitutional amendment to be presented to the electorate and designed to encourage competitive districts (but with significant loopholes included) was passed by the California Senate for transmittal to the Assembly on the last possible day for the 2006 election cycle, with Assembly Democratic legislative functionaries claiming that it was not received in time. Although this could have been corrected with little effort by additional legislation, the issue was killed for the 2006 electoral cycle, with some asserting that the death of the bill was not accidental..

== Consequences ==
Negative results for the effective operation of the political process can be seen directly in California's 2008 budget impasse, extending for 76 days since June 1, with an agreement announced September 15. The high turnover due to term limits combined with "safe" districts makes it more likely that "hard liners" will be elected (via competitive but narrow primary elections) and that the legislators will lack experience in dealing across party lines in a collegial manner — there is now a complete lack of senior leadership capable of creating and enforcing cross-party compromise.

=== Repeating budget crisis ===
California's budget as it stood projected a deficit of over fifteen billion dollars, requiring program cuts and/or additional taxes, as the California budget used to require a 2/3 "supermajority" for passage (after the passage of California Proposition 25 (2010), the 2/3 supermajority is only required for tax increases), the Republican minority could stick to their pledge of no additional taxes without consideration of compromise with Democrats who have pledged to not balance the budget solely by reducing services to children, impoverished citizens, or the elderly. As a substantial portion of the budget is fixed by statute, state constitutional amendment, or by Federal court decisions regarding prison health care there was little room for maneuver in reducing expenditures without adversely affecting programs (such as public transportation and education) or for raising taxes. In fact, the "solution" involved no new taxes (but closing of some loopholes), and minor program cuts, with the bulk of the solution being creative accounting methods (such as accelerating revenue collections) that are likely to make the problem more severe in 2009 if there is not an exceptional (and unexpected) improvement in the economy. Under a veto threat by Governor Schwarzenegger some modifications were made and California in 2008 achieved a budget, almost three months late, with the structural deficit problems deferred until 2009.

Continuing problems were widely recognized in late 2008 with predictions that ongoing construction projects could soon be impacted and projected deficits of up to $42 billion over the next 18 months. The state is projected to exhaust its supply of ready money in mid February, 2009. Tentative agreements were obtained for a balanced budget in July 2009, achieved in part by "borrowing" some six billion dollars from county and city governments, an action further postponing a significant portion of the problem while likely having a severe and impact upon public safety, health, and social services. Lawsuits by the local governments are expected upon budget approval. The solution includes the continued issuing IOUs to vendors at least until October 2009 and reducing state employee's working hours and salary by 15 percent. The Governor's proposal to release some 27,000 prisoners has aroused opposition Since some of the term limited legislators were expecting to run for higher office, the budget of July 2009 (for fiscal year 2010) was divided into 30 bills, allowing candidates to vote no on selected bills so that a yes vote could not be used against them in later primary contests.

In 2011, The California State Parks officials under the direction of Governor Brown proposed the closure of seventy state parks necessitated largely by the failure of Brown's obtaining an early 2011 ballot position for a proposal to extend existing taxes due to expire, due to the opposition of the Republican legislative minority.

=== Little effect upon legislators ===
With the safety of legislative districts prior to 2012, any negative consequences of voter dissatisfaction were highly unlikely while the consequences of breaking with party stances (especially for Republicans) could be severe. In 2004, of the four Republicans who broke with party discipline, two retired and two were defeated in Republican primary contests, while in 2008 a Democratic member of the Assembly was reassigned to a much smaller office remote from the Capitol building, as punishment for her abstention from a vote during the 2008 budget impasse. In February, 2009, the Senate Minority leader was removed from his position by the Republican caucus after brokering a deal to settle the budget issue but failing to deliver the one additional Republican vote needed. It was not until February 20, 2009, that a budget agreement was signed by the governor, under a plan that combines spending reductions, additional taxes, and borrowing against state lottery revenues and removing funds from certain mandated programs, with the price of the bargain being various enabling proposals to be presented to the electorate in a May 2009 special election and in 2010. All of the May 2009 propositions (other than one intended to punish the legislators) were overwhelmingly defeated, throwing the budget crisis back to the legislature, with the Governor continuing to oppose any tax or fee increase (fees may be increased by a simple majority vote). The budget again went substantially past its deadline in June 2009 and the Governor proposed the closure of two hundred state parks. Closure of state parks would save little or no money and the proposal was widely believed to be a ploy to cause pain to California's middle class in order to bring constituent pressure upon the Legislature. Park closure is (as of Fall 2009) now seen as unlikely, but a substantial reduction in admission hours for many parks is now probable. Budget deficits are expected continue in 2010, estimated in January at $20 million, with the resolution under the current political structure expected to have severe impacts upon public education, public transport, corrections, and health and welfare.

== Remedies ==
In a direct response to the conflict of interest inherent in legislative redistricting and the legislature's repeated failures to meet constitutionally required budget deadlines, and after numerous failures of the legislature to present to the voters an amendment to the California Constitution, in 2008 the voters decided on Proposition 11 an Initiative. This proposition removes state office redistricting from the legislature and turns it over to a mixed panel of unelected designates (members of the two largest parties in the state, currently the Democratic and Republican Parties, and unaffiliated voters) whose composition is determined by a complex multi-step nomination, selection, and rejection process (Proposition 11 was passed in the November 2008 election). The initiative process, introduced to California in the "trustbusting" reforms of 1911 allows the circulation of petitions to amend the constitution, which if appropriately written (e.g., concerning only a single subject) and receiving the signatures of a sufficient number of registered voters, directs the measure to be placed before the voters. Proposition 11 was largely formatted under the guidance of Governor Arnold Schwarzenegger. Originally written to include congressional districts these were removed from the proposition at the behest of the dominant political parties.

More drastic remedies include 2009 calls for a California Constitutional Convention, hedged with restraints to prevent runaway changes, including both upfront restraint of topics to be addressed and requirements for final voter approval by the electorate.

== Actual changes (2010) ==
The November elections of 2010 brought more propositions regarding redistricting and gerrymandering. Two propositions were on the ballot. Prop 20 would extend Prop 11 to the redrawing of CDs in addition to the state districts encompassed by Prop 11. Prop 20 passed. Prop 27, put forward by legislators, would have repealed Prop 11 from 2008. Prop 27 failed to pass. The timing of these two propositions is important to the redistricting plans for 2011. The impact of this new system can not be predicted, but any redistricting is likely to change the status quo.

Another proposition in an earlier 2010 election, Proposition 14, passed, creating nonpartisan blanket primaries, in which the top two candidates advance to the general election, regardless of party, with all registered voters allowed to vote for any candidate. This is expected to break down the strength of party extremes. Under the previous rules a candidate successful in either of the dominant parties would likely be politically to the extreme, since primary voters tend to be more active and passionate about such positions. The presence of a larger electorate will (presumably) tend to lead to more moderate candidates succeeding under some theories since non-party (largely "swing voters") would be more "middle of the road". Combined with the redistricting propositions noted above this will likely lead to unexpected effects (owing to the potential for cross-party mischief), and it is generally agreed that some districts may present two Democrats or two Republicans in opposition in the general election. In theory, in a general election, especially if of the same party, the more moderate candidate would be more likely to succeed.

== Actual changes (2012) ==
Although the concept of non-partisan districting was initially promoted by Republicans under the leadership of Governor Arnold Schwarzenegger, the results were highly unfavorable to the party. Redistricting was intended to be guided by the testimony of "communities of interest" and not political parties, but Democrats organized staffers to give testimony while presenting themselves as community members. For example, a lobbyist from Sacramento presented herself as a representative of the Asian community of the San Gabriel Valley. Conversely, the Republicans were "essentially non-entities in the redistricting process."

The U.S. congressional, State Assembly, and State Senate were significantly affected by both the non-partisan redistricting and the open primaries. The redistricting process was originally expected to have minimal effects on the number of congressional seats for each party. Despite Republican areas outpacing Democratic areas in population growth, Democrats gained several seats, while Republicans lost seats. Residents of Little Saigon, the largest Vietnamese community in the U.S., implored the redistricting commission to include them in a single district to remedy decades of vote dilution. Instead, the commission was persuaded by associates of Representative Loretta Sanchez to split Little Saigon in half, combining one half with Long Beach, which is only 1% Vietnamese.

=== Proposition 40 presented ===
An initiative to repeal the non-partisan redistricting in future State Senate elections was confusingly worded and presented ( voting "No" would not continue the current neutral party redistricting to overturn the California State Senate redistricting plan approved by the California Citizens Redistricting Commission and so restoring the status quo ante for that chamber). Thus, presenters of the proposition were defeated (since the measure passed). In other words, the promoters of the referendum were intending it to fail. Owing to widespread support for continuation of neutral redistricting they did not sponsor the usual media effort, and most voters were made aware of the nature of the proposition through various media editorials, these largely in favor of continuing neutral redistricting. A related referendum to nullify the Congressional District Boundaries Plan did not qualify, having received insufficient petition signatures.

== Effect of new election processes (2012) ==
=== California Assembly and State Senate ===
The results in the California Assembly and California State Senate were shocking to the Republicans, as now more than 2/3 of the members of each house are Democrats. Where Republicans could block certain legislation requiring a supermajority (notably those concerning taxes), they no longer have that power, although for any issues in which the Democrats are divided the Republicans will in certain circumstances continue to have significant power. In the following years, Democrats occasionally lost their supermajorities, but always remained close. It has been argued that the Californian standing committee has failed to end gerrymandering.

=== California delegation to the U. S. House of Representatives ===
After the 2000 U.S. census, California gained one seat. The 2010 U.S. census, however, kept the state's apportionment at 53 seats.

The new reapportionment method resulted in a re-numbering of districts, many of which covered areas previously assigned to other numbers. As a consequence, most incumbents ran in newly numbered districts, yet these remained favorable to their re-election. Some incumbent members chose to run within a similar geographic region yet were required to change their residence.

A new open primary system was instituted, where members of any party or of no party could vote for any of the candidates. This allowed unaffiliated voters to cast ballots also. Owing to the results of this system, some incumbents were placed against opponents of their own party in the general election, while a number of others ran against unaffiliated opponents (indicated below by the California Election Code designation DTS, "Decline To State"), commonly referred to as independent (bundled here with a term with similar effect, "NPP" - "No Party Preference").

In the 2012 table row, below, in other than the typical Republican-Democratic party matches the affiliations are noted (e.g. R-R for Republican vs. Republican, D-DTS for Democrat vs. Decline To State). One result of the new procedures was the 15th district defeat of a twenty-term Democratic representative, Pete Stark, by a young and fellow democrat, Dublin councilman and Alameda County prosecutor Eric Swalwell, a same-party turnover that would have been highly unlikely under the previous primary system, which highly favored incumbents. One columnist suggests that competitive and well financed same-party general election challenges could become the new norm for districts of this type.

The demographics of many of the regions have shifted considerably since the turn of the 21st century. While the previous gerrymandered districts would have protected most of the incumbents, the new districting did not offer such protection except incidentally, owing to the non-uniform geographic distribution of various subsections of the electorate. In addition, significant changes in the racial makeup of the electorate, the addition of and turnout by younger voters, and the continued evolutionary changes in voter attitudes toward socially divisive issues all currently tend to favor the Democratic Party, but this is largely due to the current attitudes and policies of the Republican party - those being at least potentially subject to future change. One notable contest that could guide such changes was the election of Republican and Portuguese-descended David Valadao, in a district with registration favorable to the Democrats and against an Hispanic opponent. This contest is arguably the only delegation's House seat win for the Republicans, as all others could be considered to be holds or losses.

Under the previous decade's apportionment and primary system a win by less than 55% was rare. In the 2012 elections, there were eleven such contest victories. The 2014 elections will be informative as to the durability of these conditions, as many first-term representatives will then be running as incumbents, usually an advantage. This typical advantage will likely be affected by the new open primary system in some manner.

Prior to the two major changes in California elections (neutral reapportionment and open primaries), Republicans controlled nineteen of the delegation's House seats, subsequently, only fifteen, a loss of four seats, a significant number considering that nationwide only a total of four additional House seats were lost to the party. The low congressional losses in other states may be due to 2010 Republican gains in various state's legislature control that enabled significant gerrymandering success for the party.

The combination of pre-election retirements and electoral defeats of a total of 14 incumbents has also led to a significant reduction in the overall seniority of the delegation, important in the obtaining of committee chairmanships for the House majority party, "ranking member" status for certain members of the minority party, and for leadership and policy committee positions within the respective party caucuses.

Seven incumbents retired prior to the 2012 election:

- Wally Herger (R, 13 terms)
- Lynn Woolsey (D, 10 terms)
- Dennis Cardoza (D, 5 terms)
- Elton Gallegly (R, 13 terms)
- David Dreier (R, 16 terms)
- Jerry Lewis (R, 17 terms)
- Bob Filner (D, 10 terms)

Seven incumbents lost seats:

- Dan Lungren (R, 4 terms) to a Democrat
- Pete Stark (D, 20 terms) to a fellow Democrat
- Howard Berman (D, 15 terms) to a fellow incumbent Democrat, Brad Sherman (8 terms)
- Brian P. Bilbray (R, 9 terms) to a Democrat
- Mary Bono Mack (R, 6+ terms) to a Democrat
- Laura Richardson (D, 2+ terms) to a fellow incumbent Democrat, Janice Hahn (1 term)
- Joe Baca (D, 5 terms) to a fellow democrat Gloria Negrete McLeod, who was aided by an outside SuperPAC supported by centrist NYC Mayor Michael Bloomberg, but others have pointed out Baca's own flaws as being key to his defeat.

== 2012 Term limits modification (California Assembly and Senate only) ==
In the 2012 June primary election, voters passed (by a 61 percent vote) Proposition 28, despite a well-funded opposition telephone robo-calling effort calling it a "scam". (Propositions are presented to the electorate by the legislature.) In light of the failure of earlier term limit modification attempts it was carefully written to only apply to newly elected legislators and effectively reducing the maximum combined Assembly and Senate service from 14 to 12 years. Previously, an Assembly member could only serve three two-year terms and if achieving a Senate seat, two four-year terms, for a potential service time of 14 years. This proposition allows a member to serve for a total of twelve years in any combination of Assembly and Senate terms. Thus a member initially elected to the Assembly may serve up to six two-year terms, or if initially elected to the Senate, three four-year terms. It is expected that this will ultimately enhance the experience level of Legislators and their focus on the jobs to which they were elected. With more experienced members able to guide and assist new members, and less pressure to "make a mark" quickly, it is hoped that the hasty introduction of lobbyist-written bills will be reduced.

== See also ==
- Elections in California
- 2020 United States census
- 2020 United States redistricting cycle
