= 2010 California Proposition 27 =

Proposition 27
- November 2, 2010
- Eliminate State Redistricting Commission

Results
Choice	Votes	%
Yes	3,736,443	40.59%
No	5,468,703	59.41%
Total votes	9,205,146	100.00%
County results
For
50–60%
Against
70–80%
60–70%
50–60%

Proposition 27 was an unsuccessful ballot proposition on the November 2, 2010 ballot in California, placed there by the initiative process. If approved, this measure would have repealed California Proposition 11 (2008), which authorized the creation of the California Citizens Redistricting Commission to draw the electoral boundaries for State Assembly and State Senate districts. It would also have modified the provision in California law that says that proposed congressional districts can not be subjected to a veto referendum.

According to political journalist Shane Goldmacher, Democratic political strategists said that this initiative was a political tactic to defeat Proposition 20, the Congressional Redistricting Initiative, which was also on the November 2, 2010 ballot: "Democratic political strategists say the best way to ensure a 'no' vote this fall on California Proposition 20 is to confuse the public further with a second ballot measure on the already head spinning topic of political line drawing." This tactic was ultimately unsuccessful, as Proposition 20 passed, extending the commission's power over redistricting to include U.S. House districts.

Proposition 27 and Proposition 20 each had a so-called "poison pill" provision. This meant that if both received a majority vote, the proposition that received the highest majority vote would be the law to go into effect. Since Proposition 20 passed but Proposition 27 did not, neither provision was triggered.

== Ballot title and summary ==
Ballot title:

Financial Accountability in Redistricting Act of 2010"
Initiative Constitutional Amendment and Statute

Official summary:

- Eliminates 14-member redistricting commission selected from applicant pool picked by government auditors.
- Consolidates authority for establishing state Assembly, Senate, and Board of Equalization district boundaries with elected state representatives responsible for drawing congressional districts.
- Reduces budget, and imposes limit on amount legislature may spend, for redistricting.
- Provides that voters will have the authority to reject district boundary maps approved by the legislature.
- Requires populations of all districts for the same office to be exactly the same.

Estimated fiscal impact:

- Possible reduction of state redistricting costs of around $1 million over the next year.
- Likely reduction of state redistricting costs of a few million dollars once every ten years beginning in 2020.

== Constitutional changes ==
If Proposition 27 was approved by California's voters, it would have amended some parts of the California Constitution.

Specifically, it will amend:

- Section 9 of Article II
- Section 1 of Article XXI
- Section 2 of Article XXI
- Section 3 of Article XXI

== Supporters ==
Daniel Lowenstein, the official proponent of the measure, is a professor at UCLA and a former chairman of the California Fair Political Practices Commission.

Although Lowenstein's name was on the application for the initiative, he said that the real sponsors are Democratic members of the U.S. Congress led by Howard Berman and Berman's brother Michael Berman of Berman & D'Agostino Campaigns, a paid consultant for Democrats on redistricting issues. Lowenstein says, "It's Michael and Howard together." Both Daniel Lowenstein and Michael Berman worked on the No on California Proposition 77 (2005) campaign where Mr. Lowenstein was chairman and Mr. Berman was the committee's campaign consultant. California Proposition 77 (2005) was a previous attempt at independent redistricting reform that failed at the ballot box. Mr. Lowenstein also wrote scholarly articles that highlight Michael Berman and his company.

During the 2001 California redistricting process, U.S. congresswoman Loretta Sanchez explained how the pre-Proposition 11 Gerrymandering system worked and Michael Berman's importance in the process. "Twenty thousand is nothing to keep your seat. I spend $2 million [campaigning] every year. If my colleagues are smart, they'll pay their $20,000, and Michael [Berman] will draw the district they can win in. Those who have refused to pay? God help them." Congresswoman Loretta Sanchez did not fund Yes on Proposition 27, but her sister U.S. congresswoman Linda Sanchez was among the members of Congress funding Yes on Proposition 27. However, both Congresswomen Loretta Sanchez and Linda Sanchez did fund the campaign against a previous redistricting measure, California Proposition 77 (2005).

=== Arguments in favor ===
Reasons Lowenstein gives to support his measure include:

- "Under current law, three randomly selected accountants decide who can be one of the fourteen unelected commissioners who head a bureaucracy that wields the power to decide who represents us. This reform will ensure that those who make the decisions are accountable to the voters and that all their decisions are subject to approval by the voters."

Arguments were submitted to the official California Voter Guide on behalf of a "yes" vote on Proposition 27, as were rebuttals to the arguments provided by Prop 27 opponents. The signers of these arguments were:

- Hank Lacayo, president, "Congress of California Seniors"
- Daniel H. Lowenstein
- Mark Murray, the executive director of "Californians Against Waste"

The arguments made by them for publication in the California Voter Guide on behalf of Proposition 27 focus on these themes:

- If the Citizens Redistricting Commission authorized by Proposition 11 is abolished, and legislative redistricting is instead done as it used to be done, by the members of the California State Legislature, this will save "several million dollars every ten years", according to a non-partisan analysis conducted by the California Legislative Analyst's Office.
- California is suffering a host of problems that should be tended to prior to paying attention to how state legislative district lines are drawn
- The members of the Citizens Redistricting Commission are not accountable to voters for the state legislative district boundary lines they draw, whereas the members of the California State Legislature are accountable to voters.
- Proposition 27 allows voters to have the final say if they object to a specific redistricting plan by subjecting that plan to veto referendum.

=== Donors ===
Haim Saban loaned $2 million to the campaign in mid-April. Saban is in the entertainment business and his personal fortune has been helped along by his association with the Mighty Morphin' Power Rangers. Saban also has media holdings in Israel, Europe, Asia and the United States, including a major stake in Univision, a Spanish-language network. Saban's donation to the effort to overturn Proposition 11 has raised eyebrows, because in 2008, he gave $200,000 to the campaign to pass Proposition 11.

Many of the donors were also big-money donors to the Democratic Party. Others, including Haim Saban, Fred Eychaner, George Soros, Edith Wasserman, Louise Gund, Jack C. Bendheim, Kathryn Hall, and George M. Marcus also contributed between $25,000 up to $25 million to the William J. Clinton Foundation.

Many of the donors supporting Proposition 27 were also major contributors opposing California Proposition 77 (2005), seeking to defeat an earlier proposed redistricting plan. AFSCME spent more than $1,000,000 on both Proposition 77 and on Proposition 27. The largest contribution to No on Proposition 77 was $4,000,000 from Stephen Bing's Shangri-La Entertainment Company, a major contributor to 527 political organizations. Stephen Bing is not a contributor to Yes on Proposition 27. However, Stephen Bing was the #1 top political contributor in 2002, joined by Haim Saban (#2), Fred Eychaner (#3), Peter G. Angelos (#8), and Louise Gund (#18), who funded both Yes on Proposition 27 and No on Proposition 77.

Through October 20, 2010, these donors have given $20,000 or more to the "Yes on FAIR, Yes on 27--A Coalition of Entrepreneurs, Working People, Businesses, Community Leaders Such as Karen Bass, and Other Concerned Citizens" campaign committee.

(Updated October 20, 2010)

Donor (affiliation)	Amount
Haim Saban (Saban Capital Group, president)	$2,000,000
American Federation of State, County and Municipal Employees (AFSCME)	$1,250,000
American Federation of Teachers (AFT)	$1,000,000
Working 4 Working Americans (associated with the United Brotherhood of Carpenters & Joiners)	$500,000
Democratic State Central Committee of California	$250,000
California State Council of Service Employees Political Issues Committee (SEIU)	$200,000
Judy Chu TruPAC	$125,000
Charles Calderon for State Assembly Committee	$100,000
George Soros	$100,000
Peter G. Angelos (attorney, Law Offices of Peter G. Angelos and majority owner of the Baltimore Orioles baseball team)	$100,000
Louise Gund	$100,000
Edith Wasserman (Wasserman Foundation, vice-president)	$100,000
Fred Eychaner (Newsweb Corporation, owner)	$100,000
Zenith Insurance (Stanley R. Zax, president/chairman of the board)	$100,000
International Association of Fire Fighters	$100,000
Steven S. Myers (Dolphin Capital Holdings, Inc., chairman/CEO)	$100,000
Jack C. Bendheim (Phibro Animal Health Corp., president)	$50,000
International Brotherhood of Electric Workers (IBEW) Educational Committee	$50,000
International Brotherhood of Electrical Workers (IBEW) Local No. 47	$50,000
California State Association of Electrical Workers	$50,000
California State Pipe Trades Council of the United Association	$50,000
Joseph W. Cotchett (attorney with Cotchett, Piper & McCarthy)	$25,000
Kathryn Hall (Hall Financial Group, investor; former ambassador to Austria, appointed by President Clinton)	$25,000
C. Paul Johnson (Astrale e Tierra Winery, CEO)	$25,000
Stephen Grand (Grand-Sakwa Properties, real estate investor)	$25,000
George M. Marcus (Marcus & Millichap, chairman; University of California regent appointed by former Governor Gray Davis)	$25,000
Stewart Resnick (Roll International Corp., president and chairman)	$25,000
Plumbers & Pipefitters Local 447	$25,000
DRIVE Committee (The Teamsters Union)	$25,000
Santa Ynez Band of Mission Indians	$25,000
Lloyd Thomas Galloway (attorney at Galloway & Associates)	$20,000

Note: "Working 4 Working Americans" is described by Capitol Weekly as "a Washington, D.C.–based, labor-backed group."

=== Donations from individuals ===
The following table lists the individuals that contributed $20,000 or more to the Yes on Prop. 27 campaign. Many of the top individual donors also are big-money donors to the Democratic Party. The table indicates

- the individual donor's name, (ordered by contribution, then by last name)
- the affiliation of the donor,
- the dollar amount contributed to the Yes on Proposition 27 campaign,
- whether the donor's address on record is within California or out-of-state,
- whether the individual also contributed to the No on California Proposition 77 (2005) campaign
- the amount of money given in 2010 to the Democratic Senatorial Campaign Committee (DSCC),
- the amount given in 2010 to the Democratic Congressional Campaign Committee (DCCC),
- the amount given in 2010 to the Democratic National Committee (DNC),
- the amount given to the Clinton Foundation (provided only as a range where K = $1,000 and M = $1,000,000), and
- the amount given to host the 2009 Obama Inauguration,
- the affiliation's position on the OpenSecrets.org Heavy Hitters List of Top All-Time Donors
- the percent of money that the affiliation gives to members of the Democratic Party (from Heavy Hitters List unless otherwise noted).

(Updated October 11, 2010)

Individual	Affiliation	$ amount to Yes on Prop. 27	Donor address in California?	Donor to No on Prop. 77 (2005)?	$ Amount to DSCC (2010)	$ Amount to DCCC (2010)	$ Amount to DNC (2010)	$ Amount to Clinton Foundation	$ Amount to Obama Inauguration	Affiliation's position on OpenSecrets.org Heavy Hitters List	Affiliation's % of contributions given to Democrats
Haim Saban	Saban Capital Group (chairman/CEO)	$2,000,000	Yes	YES	$34,400	$30,400	-	$5M to $10M	-	#85	99%
Peter G. Angelos	Offices of Peter G. Angelos (attorney); Baltimore Orioles baseball team (majority owner)	$100,000	NO	YES	$40,400	-	$30,200	-	-	-	94%
Fred Eychaner	Newsweb Corporation (owner), Alphawood Foundation (founder and chairman)	$100,000	NO	YES	$30,400	-	$15,200	$10M to $25M	$50,000	#100	100%
Louise Gund	Philanthropist, Louise Gund Foundation	$100,000	NO	YES	$30,000	$30,400	-	$50K to $100K	-	-	-
Steven S. Myers	Dolphin Capital Holdings, Inc. (chairman/CEO); SM&A (CEO, Rrtired)	$100,000	Yes	No	-	$30,400	$60,400	-	$300	-	52%
George Soros	Soros Fund Management (chairman)	$100,000	NO	No	-	$20,000	$15,200	$500K to $1M	$200,000 (includes relatives)	-	59% (36% other, non-Repub.)
Edith Wasserman	Retired, Wasserman Foundation (vice-president)	$100,000	Yes	YES	$35,400	$30,400	-	$5M to $10M	-	-	91%
Stanley R. Zax	Zenith Insurance Company (president/chairman of the board)	$100,000	Yes	No	$10,000	$30,400	-	-	-	-	91%
Jack C. Bendheim	Phibro Animal Health Corp. (president)	$50,000	NO	YES	$15,000	$21,300	-	$25K to $50K	-	-	94%
Joseph W. Cotchett	Cotchett, Piper & McCarthy (attorney)	$25,000	Yes	No	$30,400	-	-	-	-	-	99%
Stephen Grand	Grand-Sakwa Properties (real estate investor)	$25,000	Yes	YES	-	-	-	-	-	-	-
Kathryn Hall	Hall Financial Group (investor)	$25,000	NO	YES	$33,600	-	-	$100K to $250K	$50,000	-	100%
C. Paul Johnson	Astrale e Terra, (CEO)	$25,000	Yes	YES	-	-	$30,400	-	$3,000	-	100%
George M. Marcus	Marcus & Millichap (chairman); University of California (regent)	$25,000	Yes	YES	-	$45,600	-	$250K to $500K	$15,000	-	91%
Stewart Resnick	Roll International Corp. (president and chairman)	$25,000	Yes	No	-	-	$15,200	-	-	-	67%
Lloyd Thomas Galloway	Galloway & Associates (attorney)	$20,000	NO	No	-	-	-	-	-	-	100%

Donors Haim Saban and Fred Eychaner received prior attention for their multimillion-dollar donations to the Democratic Party.

Donor Haim Saban ...

- was No. 6 on the 2000 top individual donors list, giving 99% to Democrats with contributions exceeded $1 million
- was No. 2 on the 2002 top individual donors list, giving 100% to Democrats with contributions exceeded $9.3 million
- is No. 27 on the 2010 top individual donors list so far, giving 98% to Democrats

Donor Peter G. Angelos ...

- was No. 18 on the 2008 top individual donors list, giving 99% to Democrats with contributions exceeded $263,000.
- the No. 1 contributor to Nancy Pelosi's 2010 campaign.
- contributed $151,000 to a variety of 527 political committees

Donor Fred Eychaner ...

- is No. 11 on 2010 top individual political donors list, giving 34% to Democrats, 66% to Other, 0% to Republicans; contributions exceeded $265,000
- is No. 7 on 2010 top contributors to 527 organizations providing significant money for EMILY's List
- contributed over $5.77 million to a variety of 527 political committees
- hosted a 2008 fundraiser for then-candidate Barack Obama in his home
- donated the maximum-allowable $10,000 to the Clinton Legal Defense Fund
- was named to the board of trustees of the John F. Kennedy Center for the Performing Arts by President Obama

Donor Louise Gund ...

- was No. 18 on 2002 top individual donors list, giving 100% to Democrats; contributions exceeded $1 million
- is on the board of trustees with Earthjustice, formerly the Earth Justice Legal Defense Fund, or the Sierra Club Legal Defense Fund
- contributed over $1.38 million to a variety of 527 political committees

Donor George Soros ...

- tied for #2 on the 2008 top individual donors to 527 political committees, giving $5,000,000 to a variety of organizations.
- was No. 3 on the 2006 top individual donors to 527 political committees, giving $3,542,500 to a variety of organizations.
- was No. 1 on the 2004 top individual donors to 527 political committees, giving $23,700,000 to a variety of organizations.
- contributed over $32.5 million to a variety of 527 political committees

Donor Kathryn Hall was named ambassador to Austria by President Clinton.

=== Donations from unions ===
Various labor unions have contributed a total $3,325,000 to the Yes on Proposition 27 campaign as of October 21, 2010. The table shows:

- the name of the contributing organization,
- the union's affiliation (sometimes, the contributing organization's name is purposely obscured),
- the amount of money contributed to the Yes on Proposition 27 campaign,
- the union's position on OpenSecrets list of "Heavy Hitters," the largest political donors in the United States at the federal level (the specific position on the list may vary from that published on October 21, 2010)
- the percent of contributions that go to members of the Democratic Party
- the total union campaign contributions to the U.S. Congress Members that are also funding Yes on Proposition 27 (total career contributions exceed $4,133,200)
- whether the union also contributed to the campaign against California Proposition 77 (2005), a previous redistricting proposition
- the amount of money contributed to the William J. Clinton Foundation

(Updated October 21, 2010)

Labor union	Affiliation	$ amount to Yes on Prop. 27	Position on OpenSecrets.org Top Donors List	% dues given to Democrats nationally	Total $ Congress members also funding Prop. 27	Donor to No on Prop. 77 (2005)?	$ amount to Clinton Foundation
American Federation of State, County and Municipal Employees (AFSCME)	AFL-CIO	$1,250,000	#2	98%	$864,200	YES	$250K to $500K
American Federation of Teachers (AFT)	AFL-CIO	$1,000,000	#13	98%	$332,400	No	$100K to $250K
Working for Working Americans	International Brotherhood of Carpenters & Joiners	$500,000	#12	89%	$478,200	No	-
California State Council of Service Employees Political Issues Committee	Service Employees International Union (SEIU)	$200,000	#11	92%	$348,900	YES	$250K to $500
International Association of Fire Fighters	AFL-CIO	$100,000	#47	81%	$182,800	YES	-
International Brotherhood of Electrical Workers (IBEW) Educational Committee	International Brotherhood of Electrical Workers (IBEW), AFL-CIO	$50,000	#7	97%	$784,500	YES	$100K to $250K
International Brotherhood of Electrical Workers (IBEW) Local No. 47	International Brotherhood of Electric Workers (IBEW), AFL-CIO	$50,000	#7	97%	$784,500	No	$100K to $250K
California State Association of Electrical Workers	International Brotherhood of Electric Workers (IBEW)	$50,000	#7	97%	$784,500	No	$100K to $250K
California State Pipe Trades Council of the United Association	Plumbers & Pipefitters Union, AFL-CIO	$50,000	#44	94%	$451,100	No	-
Plumbers & Pipefitters Local 447	Plumbers & Pipefitters Union, AFL-CIO	$25,000	#44	94%	$451,100	No	-
DRIVE Committee	Teamsters Union	$25,000	#10	93%	$691,000	No	-
Plumbers & Steamfitters Union No. 467	Plumbers & Pipefitters Union, AFL-CIO	$10,000	#44	94%	$451,100	No	-

Nationally, the Service Employee International Union (SEIU) ...

- was the No. 1 contributor to 527 political committees in 2004, totaling $53,352,07
- was the No. 1 contributor to 527 political committees in 2006, totaling $32,929,734
- was the No. 1 contributor to 527 political committees in 2008, totaling $36,708,275
- is the #1 contributor to 527 political committees in 2010 (to date), totaling $10,764,321
- spent over $133,000,000 on 527 political committees during the 2004, 2006, 2008, and 2010 election cycles

The California State Council of Service Employees union, part of the SEIU ...

- was ranked the No. 2 overall spender in California politics, attempting to influence voters and public officials, by spending $107,467,272
- was second in spending only to the California Teachers Association (CTA)

=== Politicians who are donors ===
Members of the U.S. Congress who are donors:

Eighteen Democratic members of California's delegation to the U.S. Congress, including Nancy Pelosi, cumulatively gave $175,000 to the initiative effort in February 2010, when the campaign needed funds to pay petition circulators to collect signatures to qualify the measure for the ballot. Proposition 20, the Congressional Redistricting Initiative, which is also on the November 2, 2010 ballot in California is what motivated the round of donations from congressional representatives, according to some pundits.

California has 54 seats in the U.S. Congress. Heading into the November 2, 2010 election, 34 of those seats are held by Democrats. As of October 11, 2001, 18 (nearly 53%) of those incumbent Democratic members of California's delegation to the U.S. Congress had given money to the campaign to urge a "yes" vote on Proposition 27.

No members of the state's other party delegations have, as of October 21, 2010, given money to the "Yes on 27" committee.

The 18 Democratic incumbent Congress members who either gave money directly to the campaign, whose campaign committees gave money, or whose affiliated political action committee gave money to Proposition 27 are listed below. The table indicates ...

- the Congress member's name,
- the member's congressional district,
- the member's party affiliation,
- the amount of money contributed to Yes on Proposition 27,
- whether the Congress member is a current or former member of the Congressional Progressive Caucus,
- whether the Congress member also contributed to the effort opposing a previous redistricting reform, California Proposition 77 (2005),
- the amount of career campaign donations from the unions that also support Proposition 27 (union contributions to these Congress members exceeds $4.1 million),
- the percentage of campaign contributions from outside of California, according to Influence Explorer (a number greater than 50% indicates possible undue influence from out-of-state special interests),
- the percentage of campaign contributions from political action committees (PAC), as opposed to individual donors, according to Influence Explorer (a number greater than 50% indicates possible undue influence by special interests).

(Updated October 21, 2010)

Congress member	California congressional district	Political party	$ amount to Yes on Prop. 27	Congressional Progressive Caucus member?	Donor to No on Prop. 77 (2005)?	Career campaign $ from unions supporting Prop. 27	% contributions from outside California	% contributions from PACs
Howard Berman	CA-28	Democrat	$10,000	No	YES	$126,500	19%	35%
Lois Capps	CA-23	Democrat	$10,000	No	YES	$387,000	11%	48%
Judy Chu	CA-32	Democrat	$225,000+	YES	No	$87,800	4%	31%
Anna Eshoo	CA-14	Democrat	$10,000	No	YES	$158,100	13%	54%
Sam Farr	CA-17	Democrat	$10,000	YES	YES	$354,200	15%	66%
Mike Honda	CA-15	Democrat	$10,000	YES	YES	$206,200	23%	42%
Barbara Lee	CA-9	Democrat	$10,000	YES	YES	$238,100	17%	39%
Zoe Lofgren	CA-16	Democrat	$10,000	No	YES	$191,000	12%	54%
Nancy Pelosi	CA-28	Democrat	$10,000	YES (former)	YES	$347,400	30%	55%
Doris Matsui	CA-5	Democrat	$10,000	No	No	$108,000	44%	56%
George Miller	CA-7	Democrat	$10,000	YES	YES	$427,900	52%	68%
Laura Richardson	CA-9	Democrat	$5,000	YES	No	$155,800	22%	81%
Lucille Roybal-Allard	CA-34	Democrat	$10,000	YES	YES	$288,000	24%	58%
Linda Sánchez	CA-39	Democrat	$25,000	YES	YES	$184,800	27%	57%
Adam Schiff	CA-29	Democrat	$10,000	No	YES	$157,000	13%	41%
Jackie Speier	CA-12	Democrat	$10,000	No	No	$64,500	4%	31%
Diane Watson	CA-33	Democrat	$10,000	YES	YES	$147,000	18%	53%
Lynn Woolsey	CA-6	Democrat	$5,000	YES (co-chair)	YES	$504,200	8%	54%

== Opposition ==
=== Opponents ===
- John Diaz, the editorial page editor of the San Francisco Chronicle, wrote, "The proposed ballot language for the Financial Accountability in Redistricting Act makes the laughably absurd argument that this is about money: That a state facing an "unprecedented economic crisis" with a political leadership that "has failed us" cannot afford the cost of outsourcing this duty to a commission. A more honest title of this initiative, which is being conceived by a small group of Democratic insiders, would be the Incumbent Protection Act."
- The editorial board of the Daily Breeze recommended that the publication's readers refrain from signing the petition to put this measure on the ballot, saying, "...staying in office and party control of seats has become more important than representing the people who gave them those seats in the first place."
- Ian Johnson of The Rose Institute of State and Local Government at Claremont McKenna College said, "The California Democratic redistricting machine is worried. Led by Congressman Howard Berman and his consultant brother Michael, they controlled the state's bipartisan incumbent-protection gerrymander in 2001. Now their control is threatened by an initiative that would place Congressional redistricting within the mandate of the Citizens Redistricting Commission. Congressman Berman and his allies are responding with a misleading measure aimed at confusing voters, apparently conceding that they cannot win the debate on the merits of their views...In one respect, FAIR is a positive sign: when the beneficiaries of the status quo are forced to resort to deception to preserve their positions, it is a sign they are desperate. Clearly, even they can see which way the winds of change are blowing."
- John Kabateck, executive director of the California branch of the National Federation of Independent Business, said, "Enough is enough. Decades of cynical, self-serving behavior from politicians has helped plummet this state into a fiscal and economic abyss. We need to be able to hold our elected officials accountable when they don’t do the job we elected them to do. One way to ensure that politicians remain accountable to voters is by taking the power to draw political district lines from the very politicians who stand to personally benefit from the outcome."

=== Arguments against ===
Arguments were submitted to the official California Voter Guide urging a "no" vote on Proposition 27, as were rebuttals to the arguments provided by Prop 27 supporters. The signers of these arguments were:

- Kathay Feng, executive director of California Common Cause
- Joel Fox, president of the Small Business Action Committee
- Ruben Guerra, president of the Latin Business Association
- Janis R. Hirohama, president of the League of Women Voters of California
- David Pacheco, president of the California branch of the AARP
- Gary Toebben, president of the Los Angeles Area Chamber of Commerce

The themes of the main arguments they make against Proposition 27 (and in favor of Proposition 20) are:

- Proposition 27, if it succeeds in repealing Proposition 11, will protect the power of political incumbents: "POLITICIANS behind Proposition 27 are very angry that voters took away their power to draw districts to guarantee their reelection when VOTERS passed Proposition 11 and established the independent Citizens Redistricting Commission. That’s why the politicians and special interests will spend millions to pass 27 and ELIMINATE THE CITIZENS COMMISSION, comprised of voters from around the state."
- The opponents of Proposition 27 agree wholeheartedly with the supporters of Proposition 27 that California is rife with many problems. However, Proposition 27 opponents say that these problems should be laid squarely at the feet of the very politicians who are trying to undo the California Citizens Redistricting Commission so that the politicians can be put back in charge of deciding where their legislative district boundaries should be drawn after ten years after the U.S. Census:
- The California Citizens Redistricting Commission that Prop 27 seeks to eliminate "is completely transparent and includes Democrats, Republicans and independents and must be representative of all Californians."
- The idea that state legislative incumbents place an excessively high value on being able to control where their legislative district boundaries are drawn every ten years is well-illustrated by a report in the Los Angeles Times that in the redistricting that took place after the 2000 Census, one political consultant was paid over $1,000,000 by allies of incumbent state legislators to draw districts that best protected their ability to win another term. "With Prop. 27, politicians want to return us to the days when legislators hired consultants to draw bizarrely-shaped districts behind closed doors, dividing up cities and communities just to guarantee their reelection."
- The assertions that Proposition 27 supporters make about how Proposition 27 will save money is a way to "mislead voters with ridiculous claims". Rather, Proposition 27 opponents argue, "Proposition 27 is not about saving money. Politicians want safe districts and will spend every taxpayer and special interest dollar they can to bankroll consultants and draw district lines to protect themselves."
- The assertion that Proposition 27 supporters make about how, if voters approve Proposition 27, voters will be able to subject any legislative redistricting plan that the California State Legislature proposes to the veto referendum process is misleading, because voters can already do that: "Voters can ALREADY reject legislative redistricting plans through the referendum process, regardless of Prop. 27."
- The idea put forward by Proposition 27 supporters that members of the California Citizens Redistricting Commission will be able to personally enrich themselves through their service on the board is "mislead[ing]" and "ridiculous": "The voter-approved citizens commission ONLY DRAWS MAPS ONCE EVERY TEN YEARS and commissioners make only a modest stipend per day when they work. That’s why taxpayer and good government groups support the Commission and oppose 27."

=== Donors against ===
There is no committee directly opposing Proposition 27. However, there is a committee called "Yes on 20, No on 27--Hold Politicians Accountable, A Coalition of Taxpayers, Seniors, Good Government Groups, Small Business and Community Organizers", whose aim is to pass Proposition 20, a competing ballot measure, and defeat Proposition 27. Because Proposition 27 contains "poison pill" language countering Proposition 27, any money spent to promote a "Yes" vote on Proposition 20 might be considered money spent to oppose Proposition 27, and vice versa.

Charles T. Munger Jr. and his wife Charlotte Lowell are the primary driving force behind Proposition 20 and are its primary funder. Charles T. Munger Jr. is the son of Charles T. Munger Sr., a vice-president at Berkshire Hathaway.

Donors of $20,000 and over to "Yes on 20, No on 27" through October 21 are listed below. The table shows ...

- the name of the individual or organization,
- the affiliation to another organization,
- the amount of money contributed to "Yes on 20, No on 27",
- whether the donor address is within California.

(updated October 21, 2010)

Individual/organization	Affiliation	$ amount to Yes on Prop. 20 No on Prop. 27	Donor address in California?
Charles T. Munger Jr.	Stanford Linear Accelerator Center (physicist, self-employed)	$11,177,603	YES
Charolette A. Lowell	Attorney, Self-Employed	$956,001	YES
Diane B. Wisely	A. Wisely Properties (executive)	$100,000	YES
California Business Political Action Committee (CALBUSPAC)	California Chamber of Commerce	$85,000	YES
William Bloomfield	Retired	$50,000	YES
Susan L. Groff	Northwest Excavating (contractor)	$50,000	YES
Rebecca Q. Moran	Retired	$50,000	YES
Geoffrey C. Rusack	Attorney	$20,000	YES
Small Business Political Action Committee	-	$20,000	YES

All major donors to "Yes on 20, No on 27" were from California, unlike the donors supporting Proposition 27.

== Editorial opinion ==
Newspaper	Recommended vote on Prop. 27
Bakersfield Californian	NO
Contra Costa Times	NO
Fresno Bee	NO
L.A. Weekly	NO
Lompoc Record	NO
Long Beach Press-Telegram	NO
Los Angeles Daily News	NO
Los Angeles Times	NO
Marin Independent Journal	NO
Monterey Herald	NO
North County Times	NO
Oakland Tribune	NO
Orange County Register	NO
Riverside Press-Enterprise	NO
Sacramento Bee	NO
San Bernardino Sun	NO
San Diego Union-Tribune	NO
San Francisco Bay Guardian	YES
San Francisco Chronicle	NO
San Francisco Examiner	NO
San Gabriel Valley Tribune	NO
San José Mercury-News	NO
Santa Cruz Sentinel	NO
Santa Rosa Press-Democrat	NO
USA TODAY	Implied NO
Ventura County Star	NO

=== Yes on Prop 27 ===
Newspapers that editorialized in favor of Proposition 27 include:

- San Francisco Bay Guardian: "This measure abolishes that panel and would allow the Legislature to draw new lines for both state and federal offices after the 2010 census. We don't love having the Legislature handle that task — but we like the existing, unaccountable, unrepresentative agency even less."

=== No on Prop 27 ===
Newspapers that editorialized against Proposition 27 include:

- Contra Costa Times: "It is telling that there is no coherent argument in the voter's guide in support of Proposition 27; that's because there is none to be made."
- Lompoc Record: "Prop. 27 would abolish the state’s redistricting commission — before it has even had a chance to act — turning the authority for drawing boundaries for state offices back over to politicians. We really shouldn’t have to make an argument for why politicians have no business feathering their own nests, but we will."
- The Long Beach Press-Telegram: "Politicians despise the independent commission because they no longer get to choose their own voters and keep seats safe for their parties. This is particularly true of Democrats because they currently hold more of those seats than Republicans. They fought the redistricting proposal in 2008, and now they're bankrolling Proposition 27 on the November ballot to kill the commission before it has even begun its work. Californians must reject this unconscionable power grab by voting yes on Proposition 20 and no on Proposition 27."
- Los Angeles Daily News: "Independent redistricting is one of the last best hopes for the fixing the state's broken political process."
- The Los Angeles Times: "Proponents of the proposition smugly titled it the Financial Accountability in Redistricting Act, and they argue that it will save money – that California cannot, in this hour of fiscal crisis, afford the 14-member commission and the staff required to carry out its duties. That's fraudulent, and they know it. California's crisis is real, but the citizens commission is an antidote, not a contributor."
- North County Times: "Prop. 27 would abolish the Citizens Redistricting Commission and restore redistricting to the Legislature. Well, the Legislature had that power for decades, and used it to draw districts designed to protect incumbents. Boundaries were crafted not to create balanced districts, but rather districts that tilt heavily toward one party or the other."
- The Orange County Register: "Voters should be careful not to confuse Prop. 20, which we view as the 'good' redistricting proposition, with Prop. 27, the 'bad' redistricting proposition. Prop. 27 would essentially undo the good work of 2008's Prop. 11 for state offices, hamstring Prop. 20 for congressional offices and further entrench the power of politicians to pick their own districts. Prop. 27 would end the establishment of more balanced voting districts before they even are created."
- Riverside Press Enterprise: "California has no reason to backtrack on governmental reforms. The dismal records of state and federal legislators should spur voters to expand changes that can improve government, not toss the whole effort out. Thus in November voters should pass Prop. 20, and reject Prop. 27."
- Sacramento Bee: "Supporters of Proposition 27 make the same arguments they did against Proposition 11, with the added criticism that the panel selection process is over budget. Their case is just as unconvincing this time. The citizen commission holds the promise of creating legislative districts that are more competitive and that will give more California voters a real choice. It should be given the chance to succeed.
- San Bernardino Sun: "Proposition 27 is not drawing as much attention as some of the other statewide measures on the Nov. 2 ballot. That's too bad, because marking No on Proposition 27 might be the most important thing voters can do for California's future." "The campaign finance reports for Proposition 27 tell the story. The vast majority of the $1 million-plus in donations come from current or aspiring Democratic members of Congress and their supporters, who fear losing power."
- San Diego Union-Tribune: "Proposition 27 is about blocking change and protecting the status quo. We urge a no vote."
- San Gabriel Valley Tribune: "But Proposition 27, which citizens will cast their votes on Nov. 2, would be an easy one to paint as the most scurrilous proposition this time around. It would take the excellent redistricting reforms Californians approved as Proposition11 two years ago and trash them, going back to the perfectly awful status quo."
- Santa Cruz Sentinel: "Politicians naturally have been unhappy about losing this power. The Democratic Party, the majority party in our state, is mainly bankrolling Proposition 27, which would end the commission before it has even started. Why? Because some politicians could lose their seats. Others might be forced to run against credible opposition candidates, which could mean they would have to move more toward positions benefiting all Californians, rather than narrow party or special interests."
- Santa Rosa Press Democrat: "The backers of Proposition 27, primarily the state's congressional delegation, included an artificial spending cap so they could claim this is a cost-cutting measure. Don't be fooled. In addition to losing an independent process, there will be ample special interest money, from groups that benefit from the status quo, to more than make up for a tiny cut in public spending on the once-a-decade redistricting process.".
- Ventura County Star: "Proposition 27 would eliminate the citizens’ commission altogether and return all — all — redistricting duties back to the politicians’ cronies in the state Legislature Supporters of Proposition 27 claim it would save money, but we seriously doubt that any meaningful savings would ever materialize if voters let politicians have their way. That's how California got to where we are today."

== Campaign finance complaint ==
Supporters of the Voters FIRST Act for Congress have asked the Fair Political Practices Commission and the Federal Election Commission to investigate whether some members of California's U.S. Congressional delegation are "hiding their controlling involvement in the initiative" in a way that obscures who is really behind it.

== Path to the ballot ==
On December 28, 2009, Daniel Lowenstein filed a request with the Office of the California Attorney General for an official ballot title.

The official ballot title was provided on February 5, 2010.

Signatures to qualify the measure for the ballot were collected by Kimball Petition Management at a cost of $2,820,124.

== Results ==
2010 California Proposition 27
Choice	Votes	%
For	3,736,443	40.59
Against	5,468,703	59.41
Total	9,205,146	100.00
Source: California Secretary of State
