= Charles Munger Jr. =

American physicist and political donor

- Born: 1956 or 1957 (age 69–70)
- Education: Stanford University (BS); University of California, Berkeley (PhD)
- Occupation: Physicist
- Political party: Republican
- Movement: Independent redistricting in California
- Spouse: Mandy Lowell
- Children: 3
- Father: Charlie Munger

Charles Thomas Munger Jr. is an American physicist and political donor, known for his support of nonpartisan redistricting in California. A member of the Republican Party and son of Charlie Munger, he emerged as the principal financial backer of Proposition 77 (2005), Proposition 11 (2008), Proposition 20 (2010), and as an opponent of Proposition 50 (2025).

A key ally of Governor Arnold Schwarzenegger, Munger is considered by many to be responsible for the creation of the California Citizens Redistricting Commission. He was also a major donor supporting Proposition 32 (2012) and opposing Proposition 30 (2012).

From 2012 to 2015, Munger served as chair of the Santa Clara County Republican Party. He resides in Palo Alto, California.
