= 2008–2012 California budget crisis =

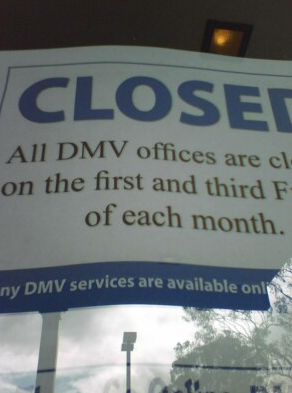
Furlough at a California Department of Motor Vehicles office in 2009

The U.S. state of California had a budget crisis in which it faced a shortfall of at least $11.2 billion, and projected to top $40 billion over the 2009–2010 fiscal years.

== 2008 ==
On September 23, 2008, about three months after its due date, Governor Arnold Schwarzenegger signed the 2008–2009 budget. Worsening financial conditions since 2007 left the state with a substantial budgetary shortfall.

Per the California Constitution at the time, a two-thirds vote in both houses of the California State Legislature was required to pass a budget. In both the original budget negotiations and the attempt to revise the budget, no political party by itself had enough votes to pass a budget. The Democrats in the majority fought to minimize cuts to programs, while most of the minority Republicans refused to accept any tax increase. The original budget was put together by Democrats and some Republicans using spending cuts, internal borrowing, and accounting maneuvers.

In November 2008, Schwarzenegger proposed spending reductions, including the following measures concerning state employees:

- One furlough day per month, equivalent to a reduction in pay of about 5 percent;
- Elimination of the Columbus Day and Lincoln's Birthday holidays;
- Employees who must work on holidays would receive holiday credit for later use, as opposed to receiving time-and-a-half pay;
- Employees would more easily be able to work four ten-hour days per week; and,
- Overtime pay rules would be changed so that leave time would no longer be considered as part of time worked.

In December 2008, Schwarzenegger ordered mandatory furloughs of two days per month for state employees, as well as "layoffs, reductions and other efficiencies" to achieve savings in the General Fund of up to 10%.

== 2009 ==
Labor organizations filed lawsuits and took other actions in an attempt to stop the furloughs of state workers. On Jan. 29, 2009, a Superior Court Judge ruled that Schwarzenegger had emergency furlough power, and on February the 3rd District Court of Appeal in Sacramento said the appeal to the decision came too late and was incomplete, so judges were unable to determine if a halt to state furloughs is legally justified. As part of the furlough, various state offices were closed on the 1st and 3rd Fridays of every month from February 1, 2009 through June 30, 2010, which was estimated to save the State $1.3 billion.

By February 2009, California State Controller John Chiang delayed $3.5 billion in state payments (including state tax refunds) for at least 30 days because the state was experiencing cash flow difficulties.

The state legislature passed a budget in February 2009 that depended on the voters approving tax extensions and money redirection into the general fund, which in May the voters did not approve. Governor Arnold Schwarzenegger then proposed $16 billion in cuts and also borrowing money from local governments. In the legislature, the Republicans agreed to lower the income of state employees, but the Democrats resisted these proposals and suggested increasing fees to be paid by smokers and oil wells. Neither party agreed to borrowing money from local governments.

On April 1, 2009, the state sales and use tax was temporarily increased by one percentage point.

The state had been selling bank-guaranteed short-term notes to get cash, but in June 2009 its credit rating was lowered. When the state asked for a federal guarantee of the notes, the Obama administration said it had no legal authority to back state notes and that the state should solve its own problems.

On July 1, 2009, Schwarzenegger ordered state workers to take a third furlough day each month. On July 2, 2009, the state government began issuing IOUs to meet its short term financial obligations. Five days later, Bank of America, Citigroup, Wells Fargo, and JP Morgan Chase announced that they would stop accepting IOUs by July 10. Fitch Ratings dropped California's bond rating from A-minus to BBB.

On July 24, 2009, the state government passed a budget that included $15 billion in service cuts, including $8.1 billion in education cuts. Eliminated from the final plan included proposals to borrow money from city and county governments and to drill for oil off the coast of Santa Barbara. Chiang announced in August 2009 that the IOU program would end the next month and that California would pay off 327,000 IOUs worth almost $2 billion (~$2.91 billion in 2025).

The budget crisis led to cutbacks and many layoffs at state universities in California. In order to curb the budget shortfalls, the California Board of Regents voted on a 32% raise in all tuition costs for state universities. This led to the 2009 California college tuition hike protests, with dozens of college students protesting the 32% tuition increase.

== From 2012 and into 2013 ==
With the passage of Proposition 30 in 2012 and a steadily improving economy, for the first time in many years, California Governor Jerry Brown's proposed budget plan for 2013 listed a small surplus.

== Causes of budget deficit ==
A major source of the deficit was a decline in state revenues from more than $100 billion in 2007 to about $85 billion in 2008—mostly due to declines in personal income taxes, corporate taxes and other taxes.

=== Required legislative supermajorities ===
News reports and commentators have cited the state's various legislative supermajority requirements as a contributing factor to the state budget crisis. The state has a long history of supermajority requirements with a 1933 state ballot measure mandating a two-thirds supermajority to pass the state budget and California Proposition 13 (1978) mandating another two-thirds supermajority to pass tax increases. The National Conference of State Legislatures (NCSL) notes that, as of 2008, only 9 states required a supermajority to pass the state budget and of those 9, only 3 (California, Arkansas, and Rhode Island) required a two-thirds supermajority instead of a three-fifths supermajority to pass the state budget. The NCSL also notes that, as of 2008, 15 states required a supermajority to raise taxes and that California was among the 10 of those 15 that require more than a three-fifths supermajority (i.e., a 2/3 or 3/4 supermajority).

==== Reforms ====
Proponents of ending the state's supermajority requirements note that "Since 1980, the California State Legislature has met the June 15 constitutional deadline for sending a budget to the governor only five times (of thirty budget periods). Only ten times has the brokering been done by the July 1 start of the fiscal year." They sponsored California Proposition 25 (2010), a ballot initiative that changes legislative vote requirements to pass a budget, but not tax increases, from two-thirds to a simple majority. California Proposition 25 (2010) was approved in the state's November 2010 general election ballot.

== See also ==
- California state finances
