= California state finances =

Public finances of U.S. state

The budget of the U.S. state of California is made up of several funds derived from taxes. The General Fund makes up 3/4th of the entire budget; it allocates money to state operations and payments to localities. The annual budget is proposed by the California State Legislature and approved by the Governor of California, who enjoys the prerogative of line-item veto.

== California's tax system ==
California levies a 9.3 percent maximum variable rate income tax, with six tax brackets, collecting about $40 billion per year (representing approximately 51% of General Fund revenue and 40% of tax revenue overall in FY2007). As of 2024, the highest marginal income tax rate has been raised to 12.3% with 9 tax brackets. California has a state sales tax of 8.25%, which can total up to 10.75% with local sales tax included. All real property is taxable annually, the tax based on the property's fair market value at the time of purchase or completion of new construction. Property tax increases are capped at 2% per year (see Proposition 13).

One notable side effect of California's tax structure is that a substantial portion of the state's income comes from a small proportion of wealthy citizens. For example, it is estimated that in 2022 the top 5% of state taxpayers (those with tax returns showing over $200,000 in yearly income) paid approximately 70% of state income taxes.

The high income tax system of California has caused many wealthy individuals to flee the state, such as Elon Musk and Travis Kalanick, with the latter mentioning California's "enormous 13.3 percent state income tax rate" as one of the main reasons.

== Surplus ==
California had a surplus of $97.5 billion as of 2022, "...almost as much as the entire budget of Ireland", yet critics have decried the surplus as not producing, "...improvements in the provision of services..."

== California public spending ==
State spending increased from $56 billion in 1998 to $131 billion in 2008, and the state was facing a budget deficit of $40 billion in 2008.

California faced a $26.3 billion budget deficit for the 2009–2010 budget year. While the legislative bodies appeared to address the problem in 2008 with the three-month delayed passage of a budget they in fact only postponed the deficit to 2009 and due to the Great Recession and the 2008 financial crisis, the problem became urgent in November 2008.

California faced another budget gap for 2010, with $72 billion in debt. California faced a massive and still-growing debt.

In June 2009 Gov. Arnold Schwarzenegger said "Our wallet is empty, our bank is closed and our credit is dried up." He called for massive budget cuts of $24 billion, about 1/4 of the state's budget.

2012 brought somewhat of an improvement to state finances, though the state still faced a $16 billion budget deficit for the year. To help alleviate this, Governor Jerry Brown introduced proposals to bring measures to voters, in order to pass tax increases. If these are not passed, more severe cuts are expected. California's unemployment rate also fell from a high above 12.4% to below 11% in 2012.

In 2017 a miscalculation of the costs for the state's Medi-Cal program of $1.9 billion in 2016 led Governor Jerry Brown to project the state of California will face a $1.6 billion budget deficit. As of January 2017, California and Kansas were the only two western states with an AA− bond credit rating.

In March 2024, auditors completed their review of California’s 2021–22 finances. The federal government requires state audits to be published no later than March 31 after the previous fiscal year, but California hasn’t respected this deadline for several years. The auditors found that California understated its 2021–22 liabilities by about $29 billion.

California’s Legislative Analyst’s Office, or LAO, which is the nonpartisan state department that advises California’s policymakers on the state’s fiscal issues, increased their estimate for the state’s 2024–25 budget deficit to $73 billion. The deficit is the result of increased spending while its tax base declined. In the four years since February 2020, California lost more than 410,000 jobs. In that same four-year period, the rest of the country added more than 7.3 million jobs. California’s job loss largely reflects the state’s population loss of 472,000 since 2020. But there are also fewer opportunities as the state’s 5.3 percent unemployment rate was the nation’s highest.

== Public borrowing ==
California uses two kinds of tax anticipation notes: Revenue Anticipation Notes (RANS), which are issued and paid back within a fiscal year, and Revenue Anticipation Warrants (RAWS), which are issued on a fiscal year and paid back the following fiscal year. RANS are commonly used due to the delay between expenditure and tax collection while RAWS are only used in times of crisis.
