= Elaine Howle =

American politician

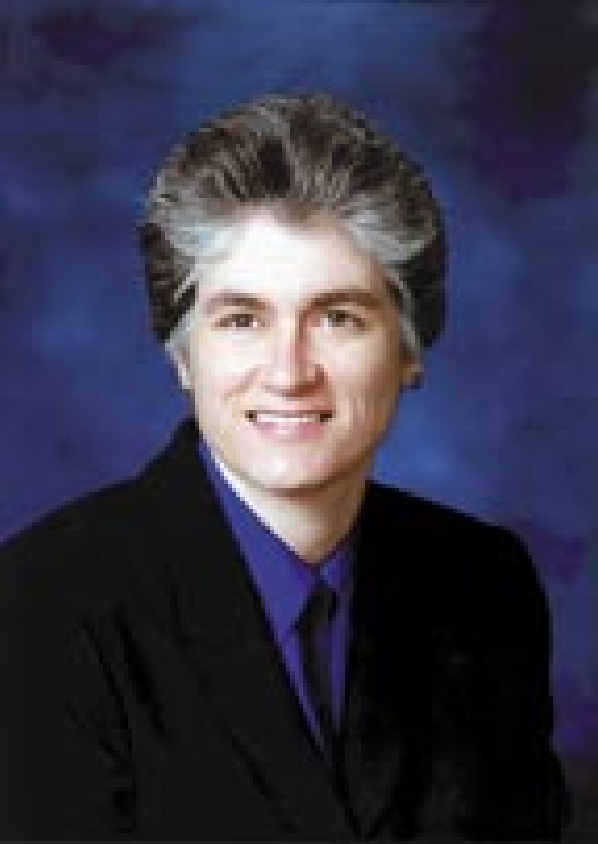
- Howle, c. 2002

California State Auditor
- In office 2000–2021
- Preceded by: Mary Noble (acting)
- Succeeded by: Grant Parks

Personal details
- Education: University of Massachusetts; California State University, Sacramento (MBA)

Elaine Howle is an American politician who served as California State Auditor from 2001 to 2021. She was the first woman to hold the position and was the longest-serving state auditor in California's history.

== Early life and education ==
Howle graduated from the University of Massachusetts with a bachelor's degree in sports management and from California State University, Sacramento with a Master of Business Administration in 1982. Howle is a lesbian.

== Career ==
After graduating from college Howle, who wanted to be an athletic director at a college, was having difficulties finding employment and was advised to work for the state auditor by her brother, who was a legislative staffer. In 1983, Howle started working for the Office of the Auditor General, which was later reorganized into the California State Auditor in 1993, as an entry-level auditor. She was promoted to supervising auditor in 1987, and principal auditor in 1994. She became the first female Deputy State Auditor in 1999.

State auditor Kurt Sjoberg resigned in 1999, and was replaced by Mary Noble in an acting role. Governor Gray Davis appointed Howle to replace him; she was the first woman to hold the position. Governors Arnold Schwarzenegger and Jerry Brown reappointed Howle as state auditor.

Governing listed Howle as public official of the year in 2012. Howle office was a part of the Varsity Blues scandal investigation. Howle was critical of FI$Cal's changing parameters and delayed implementation.

On October 25, 2021, Howle announced that she was retiring as state auditor. She was the longest serving state auditor in California's history. Governor Gavin Newsom appointed Grant Parks to replace her.

== Works cited ==
=== News ===
- "Capital woman named auditor". The Sacramento Bee. August 6, 2000. p. A3 – via Newspapers.com.
- Gutierrez, Melody (January 4, 2022). "California's longest serving auditor pulled no punches. Who will replace her?". Los Angeles Times. Archived from the original on June 3, 2026.
- Hoeven, Emily (November 12, 2021). "California's state auditor: 'Speak the truth to power'". CalMatters. Archived from the original on June 3, 2026.
- Walters, Dan (January 13, 2021). "California's technology woes deepen". CalMatters. Archived from the original on June 3, 2026.
- Warren, Jenifer (December 10, 2001). "Capitol Gains for Gay Pols". Los Angeles Times. Archived from the original on June 3, 2026.
- Watts, Julie (February 16, 2026). "They didn't just ignore audit warnings — California lawmakers quietly killed dozens of audit-backed bills". CBS News. Archived from the original on June 3, 2026.

=== Web ===
- "Elaine Howle Retiring After 21 Years as State Auditor". California Taxpayers Association. October 29, 2021. Archived from the original on June 3, 2026.
- "Elaine M. Howle, California State Auditor". California State Auditor. Archived from the original on January 11, 2010.
