= Little Hoover Commission =

Independent California state oversight agency

The California Little Hoover Commission (LHC), officially the Milton Marks "Little Hoover" Commission on California State Government Organization and Economy, is an independent California state oversight agency modeled after the Hoover Commission and created in 1962, that investigates state government operations and promotes efficiency, economy and improved service through reports, recommendations and legislative proposals.

== Roles and responsibilities ==
The Commission has broad and independent authority to evaluate the structure, organization, operation and function of every department, agency and executive branch of state government, along with the policies and methods for appropriating and administering funds.

It has produced nearly 300 comprehensive reports detailing findings and recommendations for the Governor and Legislature. These reports are maintained in a virtual library on the Commission's website.

== Organization and membership ==
By statute, the Commission is a balanced bipartisan board with 13 members – five public members appointed by the Governor, four public members appointed by the Legislature, two Senators and two Assemblymembers. Public members serve staggered, four-year terms while legislative members serve at the pleasure of the appointing authority. Members serve voluntarily, without compensation.

The Commission is staffed by seven permanent employees and occasional student interns.

== Oversight of the California State Auditor ==
The Little Hoover Commission's statutory oversight responsibilities for the California State Auditor are defined in California Government Code Section 8542 and 8544.5(d) and fall into three categories:

- Review all California State Auditor final audit reports and make recommendations to the Legislature, the Governor and the public concerning the operations of the State.
- Contract for and review an annual independent audit of the State Audit Fund and the operation of the California State Auditor to assure compliance with state laws, including Government Code Section 8546.
- Oversee the California State Auditor’s contracting activities, affirmative action plan and compliance with the State Administrative Manual.
