= Tax anticipation notes =

Tax anticipation notes are notes issued by states or municipalities to finance current operations before tax revenues are received in the United States. When the issuer collects the taxes, the proceeds are then used to retire debt. The interest income is exempt from federal income tax for the recipient—a treatment similar to that for interest income from municipal bonds. Tax anticipation notes are short term notes, issued at a discount, with a maturity period usually less than a year or a stated future date. Tax anticipation notes are used by municipalities to bridge funding gaps.

In the U.S. state of California, Revenue Anticipation Notes (RANS) are issued and paid back within a fiscal year, while Revenue Anticipation Warrants (RAWS) are issued on a fiscal year and paid back the following fiscal year.
