= Zenith Insurance Company =

American insurance company

- Type: Subsidiary
- Industry: Insurance
- Founded: 1949
- Headquarters: Woodland Hills, California
- Key people: Kari L. Van Gundy (Executive Chairman) Davidson Pattiz (President and CEO)
- Number of employees: 1466 (2014)
- Parent: Fairfax Financial
- Website: www.thezenith.com

Zenith Insurance Company is an American insurance company headquartered in California specializing in workers' compensation insurance. It has been an indirect wholly owned subsidiary of Canadian Fairfax Financial since 2010. Zenith operates nationally in the workers' compensation insurance business and conducts business through independent agencies and brokers.

== History ==
Zenith National Insurance Corporation was established in 1949. In 1971, Zenith went public and was listed on the NASDAQ stock market. In 1978, Stanley Zax was hired as Zenith's chief executive officer. In 1987, the company was listed on the NYSE under the ticker symbol ZNT.

In 2010, Fairfax Financial agreed to buy Zenith in a deal that valued the company at around $1.3 billion US. The deal was negotiated by Fairfax CEO Prem Watsa. A group of Zenith shareholders sought to prevent the sale by going to court, but a court dismissed their claims on April 22, 2010. The combined company became seventh-largest workers’ compensation insurer in California.

In 2015, the company was part of a settlement with the city of San Mateo arising from the collapse of Lehman Brothers.
