= IOU =

Informal document acknowledging debt

An IOU (abbreviated from the phrase "I owe you") is usually an informal document acknowledging debt. An IOU differs from a promissory note in that an IOU is not a negotiable instrument and does not specify repayment terms such as the time of repayment. IOUs usually specify the debtor, the amount owed, and sometimes the creditor. IOUs may be signed or carry distinguishing marks or designs to ensure authenticity. In some cases, IOUs may be redeemable for a specific product or service rather than a quantity of currency, constituting a form of scrip.

== California Registered Warrants ==
The U.S. state of California also uses the term "Registered Warrants" to refer to IOUs. These warrants, which specify a future payment date, are meant to differentiate these IOUs from regular payroll warrants which permit the holder to exchange their warrant for cash immediately. For both kinds of warrants, redeeming them may be delayed until funds are available. Because of this uncertainty, warrants are not negotiable instruments. Registered Warrants were issued in July 2009 due to a temporary inability of the state of California to redeem its warrants. Warrants are issued as payment to state employees, private businesses, local governments, taxpayers receiving tax refunds, and owners of unclaimed money.
