= 2010 California Proposition 20 =

Approved Congressional Redistricting Initiative

Proposition 20
- November 2, 2010
- Transfer Congressional Redistricting to Commission Initiative

Results
Choice	Votes	%
Yes	5,743,069	61.23%
No	3,636,892	38.77%
Total votes	9,379,961	100.00%
County results
For
70–80%
60–70%
50–60%
Against
50–60%

Proposition 20, also known as the VOTERS FIRST Act for Congress, was on the November 2, 2010 ballot in California. It was approved by 61.2% of voters. Election officials announced on May 5 that the proposition had collected sufficient signatures to qualify for the ballot.

The Congressional Redistricting Initiative:

- Added the task of re-drawing congressional district boundaries to the California Citizens Redistricting Commission (CCRC) created by Proposition 11.
- Defined a "community of interest" as "a contiguous population which shares common social and economic interests that should be included within a single district for purposes of its effective and fair representation. Examples of such shared interests are those common to an urban area, an industrial area, or an agricultural area, and those common to areas in which the people share similar living standards, use the same transportation facilities, have similar work opportunities, or have access to the same media of communication relevant to the election process."

Ballot language was filed by Charles Munger, Jr., who was also Proposition 20's largest financial supporter. Munger, the son of billionaire Charlie Munger, was a supporter of Proposition 11 in 2008, which created a new way for political districts to be drawn for California's state legislators and its state Board of Equalization.

A competing initiative that also qualified for the November 2 ballot, California Proposition 27 (2010), sought to repeal Proposition 11.

Proposition 20 and Proposition 27 each had a so-called "poison pill" provision. This means that if they both received a majority vote, the proposition that received the highest majority vote is the law that would go into effect. Since Proposition 20 passed but Proposition 27 did not, neither provision was triggered.

== Ballot language ==
Ballot title
Text of Proposition 20, the "Voters FIRST Act for Congress"

Official summary
Removes elected representatives from the process of establishing congressional districts and transfers that authority to recently authorized 14-member redistricting commission comprised of Democrats, Republicans, and representatives of neither party.

Summary of estimated fiscal impact
No significant net change in state redistricting costs.

== Congressional redistricting ==
If this initiative had not succeeded, the next Governor of California and members of the California State Legislature would have chosen how to draw lines for the 53 U.S. Congressional districts California was determined to be entitled to after the 2010 census.

From 2000 to 2010, the population in California underwent a major shift eastward, with people moving to California's inland areas from its coastal enclaves. This meant that California's congressional district boundaries would certainly undergo major upheaval after the 2010 census. As one example, the San Francisco Bay Area had grown less than 1% since the last redistricting, while the Central Valley area had grown by 21%. Los Angeles County had grown 5%, while San Diego, Orange, Riverside, San Bernardino and Imperial Counties had grown by 17%.

Another notable factor is that California's population hadn't grown much relative to the population of the rest of the United States, There were fears at the time that California might even have proportionally shrunk and that it could lose one or two seats in Congress. In the end, California's representation in Congress remained the same, which was the first time the state had not increased its congressional representation since the reapportionment following the 1920 census.

== Constitutional changes ==
Proposition 20 amended three sections of Article XXI of the California Constitution.

The three sections are:

- Section 1 of Article XXI
- Section 2 of Article XXI
- Section 3 of Article XXI

== Support ==
=== Supporters ===
Charles Munger Jr. launched the campaign to qualify the Congressional Redistricting Initiative for the 2010 ballot. Munger was also a key supporter of 2008's Proposition 11, having given about $2 million to that effort.

The New York Times characterized Proposition 20's supporters as "an unlikely collection of election-reform groups, civil rights nonprofits and former officials from both major parties who say that the current system of redistricting has left politicians unaccountable."

Supporters of Proposition 20 included:

- California Chamber of Commerce
- California State Conference of the NAACP
- AARP
- California Common Cause
- IndependentVoice.Org
- Bay Area Council
- Arnold Schwarzenegger and Gray Davis

A full list of the supporters of Proposition 20 is available from the "Yes on Proposition 20" website.

=== Arguments in favor ===
Arguments were submitted to the official California Voter Guide on behalf of a "yes" vote on Proposition 20, as were rebuttals to the arguments provided by Prop 20 opponents. The signers of these arguments were:

- David Pacheco, the California President of AARP
- Kathay Feng, the executive director of California Common Cause
- John Kabateck, the executive director of the California chapter of the National Federal of Independent Business
- Alice Huffman, President, the California chapter of the NAACP
- Julian Canete, the executive director of the California Hispanic Chambers of Commerce
- Richard Rider, chairman of the San Diego Tax Fighters

The arguments made on behalf of Proposition 20 focus on these themes:

- Proposition 20 will create fair U.S. congressional districts, which will in turn make California's representatives to the U.S. Congress more accountable and responsive, as well as making it easier to vote them out of office.
- Proposition 20 ends the current system of members of the California State Legislature being in a position to draw the U.S. Congressional district boundaries "for their friends in Congress—districts that virtually guarantee Members of Congress get reelected even when they don’t listen to voters." Also, "Right now, legislators and their paid consultants draw districts behind closed doors to guarantee their friends in Congress are reelected. Sacramento politicians pick the voters for their friends in Congress, rather than voters choosing who will represent them."
- Proposition 20 is a simple and intuitive extension of a ballot initiative that California voters already approved, California Proposition 11 (2008).
- Under the current system, politicians have used their redistricting powers to bring about unfair results, and Proposition 20 will put an end to that. For example, "In the last redistricting, Latino leaders sued after a California Congressman had 170,000 Latinos carved out of his district just to ensure he’d get reelected. Now he’s leading the charge against 20!"

== Opposition ==
Opposition to Proposition 20 was primarily driven by the supporters of Proposition 27.

=== Donors against ===
Two campaign committees officially registered in opposition to Proposition 20. They are:

- The "No on 20" campaign committee.
- The "California Coalition for Leadership and Accountability in Budget and Redistricting, Yes on 25 & 27, No on 20" campaign committee.

Through September 22, neither of the committees specifically aimed at Proposition 20 had received any contributions to speak of. However, due to the fact that California Proposition 27 contains "poison pill" language with respect to Proposition 20, any money spent to promote a "yes" vote on Proposition 27 amounts to money spent to hurt Proposition 20, and vice versa.

That main campaign committee endorsing a "yes" vote on California Proposition 27 raised millions of dollars, including a substantial amount of money from 17 members of California's delegation to the U.S. Congress as well as members of the California State Legislature such as State Rep. Charles Calderon, a $100,000 donor to the "Yes on 27" campaign.

=== Arguments against ===
Arguments were submitted to the official California Voter Guide urging a "no" vote on Proposition 20, as were rebuttals to the arguments provided by Prop 20 supporters. The signers of these arguments were:

- Daniel H. Lowenstein, a professor at UCLA and a former chairman of the California Fair Political Practices Commission.
- Mark Murray, the executive director of "Californians Against Waste"
- Hank Lacayo, president of the "Congress of California Seniors"
- Aubry L. Stone, president of the California Black Chamber of Commerce
- Carl Pope, chairman of the Sierra Club

The themes of the main arguments they made against Proposition 20 (and in favor of Proposition 27) are:

- Proposition 20 will be "a waste of taxpayer dollars".
- Proposition 20 is said by its opponents to turn back the clock on redistricting law. Proposition 20 mandates that all districts (including Assembly, Senate, and Congress) must be segregated by income level and mandates that all districts be segregated according to 'similar living standards' and that districts include only people 'with similar work opportunities.'"

== Editorial opinion ==
=== Yes on Prop 20 ===
Newspapers that editorialized in favor of Proposition 20 include:

- Contra Costa Times:
- Lompoc Record:
- The Long Beach Press-Telegram:
- Los Angeles Daily News:
- The Los Angeles Times:
- North County Times:
- The Orange County Register:
- Riverside Press Enterprise:
- San Bernardino Sun:
- San Diego Union-Tribune:
- Santa Rosa Press Democrat:
- Santa Cruz Sentinel:
- San Gabriel Valley Tribune:
- Ventura County Star:

=== No on Prop 20 ===
- Sacramento Bee:

== Path to the ballot ==
694,354 signatures were required to qualify the initiative for the ballot. Supporters turned in 1,180,623 signature in mid-March 2010, and election officials announced on May 5, 2010 that after an inspection process, the signatures met or exceeded the minimum threshold for ballot qualification.

The petition drive management company hired to collect the signatures was National Petition Management. NPM was paid $1,937,380 (through May 6) for their signature-gathering services.

== Results ==
2010 California Proposition 20
Choice	Votes	%
For	5,743,069	61.23
Against	3,636,892	38.77
Total	9,379,961	100.00
Source: California Secretary of State
