= California Citizens Redistricting Commission =

Redistricting commission for the State of California

The California Citizens Redistricting Commission (CCRC) draws the boundaries of the state's State Senate, State Assembly, and Board of Equalization districts. The commission is also responsible for drawing the boundaries for California's congressional districts, but the congressional districts drawn in 2021 were overridden in 2025 by California's voters with the passage of Proposition 50 and replaced by districts drawn by the California State Legislature. The commission retains the authority to draw the state's U.S. House districts following a decennial census, which it will exercise after the 2030 United States census.

The commission first met in 2010 and has fourteen members: five commissioners each from the first and second largest political parties in the state by voter registration, and four commissioners who are not registered with either of those two parties. Although the majority of the commission's work takes place in the year after the decennial census, all fourteen members serve for an entire decade, and all are replaced just prior to the start of the next decennial redistricting cycle.

The commissioner selection process is conducted by the California State Auditor and starts with open applications. While the selection process includes some consideration of geographic representation across the state, commissioners do not officially represent regions; all commissioners represent the whole state. As an independent, citizen commission, commissioners are prohibited from an extensive list of political positions and activities for ten years before applying and five to ten years after selection.

There is a set timeline during years ending in “9,” “0,” and “1” for the selection of new commissioners, issuance of draft maps, certification of final maps, and consideration of any challenges to final maps. The CCRC has now successfully redistricted California in both cycles since its creation (2010 and 2020). Any major change to the CCRC's current role, authority, structure, system, or timeline requires an amendment to Article XXI of the California constitution.

== History ==
In the 1980 and 1990 cycles, redistricting by the California state legislature was highly contentious and tortuous. In the 2000 cycle, an informal agreement among legislative leaders produced the so-called “Incumbent Protection Plan.” Redistricting reform ballot propositions in 1982, 1984, 1990, and 2005, all involving judges or retired judges, had all failed to pass. Inspired by Arizona's 2000 creation of the nation's first citizen-led, independent state redistricting commission with binding authority, Kathay Feng of California Common Cause, with the vocal support of Governor Arnold Schwarzenegger, helped lead the effort to draft and pass 2008's Proposition 11, the Voters First Act, creating the current CCRC for the state's legislative and Board of Equalization districts. In 2010, physicist and political reformer Charles Munger Jr. helped lead the successful campaign for Proposition 20, the Voters First Act for Congress, adding congressional districts to the CCRC's responsibilities. In 2012, Senate Bill 1096 adjusted various deadlines, resulting in the current CCRC timeline.

Over seven months, the 2010 CCRC built its administrative and technical structure and staff, collected statewide public input, and drew district maps via a public process, certifying its maps on August 15, 2011. The maps were unsuccessfully challenged by four lawsuits and one voter referendum and lasted until 2020.

The 2020 CCRC faced two new challenges. In the spring of 2020, COVID-19 pandemic travel and meeting restrictions and limitations began during the interview phase of the commissioner selection process and continued throughout the staff-recruitment, outreach, and mapping phases. The commission's work proceeded with mostly remote and hybrid meetings, based on emergency modifications to the Bagley-Keene Open Meeting Act. Then, the 134-day delay to the release of 2020 Census data required the California Supreme Court to grant a one-time extension to the CCRC's mapping deadlines. This resulted in the heaviest mapping work falling during the 2021 holiday season. The final maps were certified on December 26, 2021. Those maps received no legal challenges (saving the state $5 million that had been budgeted for the maps' legal defense) and were drawn and approved to remain in place until the 2030 redistricting cycle.

=== Proposition 50 (2025) ===
In a special election on November 4, 2025, California voters approved Proposition 50. The proposition, which amended the state's constitution, replaced the 2020 CCRC's congressional districts map with a new districts map proposed by the California State Legislature (the maps for the State Legislature and Board of Equalization were not impacted by Proposition 50). The replacement districts will be valid through the 2030 Congressional elections. The CCRC system will resume with the 2030 redistricting cycle and the 2030 CCRC's new maps will apply to elections starting in 2032.

While the commission did not take a position on Proposition 50, three former commissioners and two sitting commissioners took public positions on the proposition. Two Democratic members of the 2010 commission (Cynthia Dai and Jeanne Raya) and one Republican member of that commission (Jodie Filkins Webber) publicly drafted arguments against Proposition 50 which were included in the Voter Guide sent to all voter households. Members of the 2020 commission who had publicly expressed an opinion on the proposition were split. Democrat Sara Sadhwani publicly co-drafted arguments in favor of the proposition (which were published in the same voter guide as the arguments against the proposition drafted by the retired commissioners), whereas Democrat Patricia Sinay came out against the proposition.

== Key facts from the 2010 and 2020 redistricting cycles ==
	2010 Cycle	2020 Cycle
Number of districts: U.S. Congressional, State Senate, Assembly, BOE; total	53, 40, 80, 4; 177	52, (Note: The boundaries for the 52 congressional districts drawn by the commission were only used in the 2022 and 2024 elections.) 40, 80, 4; 176
Format for meetings	All in-person	Mostly hybrid or virtual
Census data delivery (P.L. 94–171)	Nominal, Mar. 8, 2011	Delayed, 2-stages, Aug. 12 and Sep. 16, 2021
Timeline	Within statutory deadlines, 271 days from random draw of first eight commissioners to approval of final maps	Within one-time extension, 543 days from random draw of first eight commissioners to approval of final maps
Pre-draft maps outreach & education efforts	155 commissioner public appearances	182 “Redistricting Basics” presentations + appearances
Public input: Communities of Interest (COI)	34 in-person meetings through mapping phase; Apr. 9, 2011, start	35 pre-mapping videoconference meetings for COI input; Jun. 10, 2021, start
Public input: Line drawing	(included in above 34 meetings)	13 videoconference line drawing (12 multi-day) and 3 map public input mtgs
Public input items: live / written & other / total	c. 2,700 (in person) / c. 22,000 / c. 24,700	3,897 (call-in & Zoom) / 31,353 / 35,250
Draft maps	1 (set of 4)	1 (set of 4)
Population deviation: legislative, BOE	+/- 1%	+/- 5%
Population deviation: congressional	+/- 1 person	+/- 1 person
Draft maps vote (all 4 plans)	14-0 (4 separate, identical votes)	14-0 (single vote for all 4 plans)
Final maps vote: legislative, BOE	13-1 (3 separate, identical votes)	14-0 (single vote for all 4 plans)
Final maps vote: congressional	12–2	(included in above 14–0 vote)
Voting Rights Act (VRA) Section 5 Preclearance	Jan. 17, 2012 (Dept. of Justice)	(Not required)
Executive Director	Dan Claypool	Dan Claypool (to 2/17/21) Alvaro Hernandez
Chief Counsel	Kirk Miller	Kary Marshall (to 2/26/21) Anthony Pane
Videographer	Video SSC (Kristian Manoff)	Video SSC (Kristian Manoff)
Line drawer	Q2 (Karin Mac Donald)	Haystaq DNA (Andrew Dreschler) + Q2 (Karin Mac Donald)
Outside Voting Rights Act (VRA) counsel	Gibson Dunn Crutcher	Strumwasser Woocher + David Becker
Racially Polarized Voting (RPV) analyst	Matt Barreto	Megan Gall (Blockwell Consulting)
Outside litigation counsel	Gibson Dunn Crutcher; Morrison Foerster	Strumwasser Woocher
Pre-maps lawsuits	0	1, dismissed (Moreno v. CRC)
Post-maps lawsuits	4, none prevailing (Vandermost v. Bowen, Radanovich v. Bowen, Radanovich v. Bowen II, Connerly v. California)	0
Post-maps referendum	1, Prop. 40 (Nov. 2012), passed	0
Initial commissioner applications	> 30,000	20,724
Commissioner replacements	1 (Ancheta for Kuo, Jan. 2011)	1 (Blando for Andersen, Mar. 2025)
CCRC office	910 P St., Suite 154A, Sacramento (Bonderson Building)	921 Capitol Mall, Suite 260, Sacramento (Dept. of Rehabilitation)
CCRC staff (peak)	8 (plus student interns)	27 (plus student interns)
Funding	State, Irvine Foundation	State
Overall expenditures through Jun. 2012 and Jun. 2022, including selection process	$10.5M state + $3.3M private outreach grants; inflation adj. total to 2021: $17.3M	$17.4M

== Commissioner selection process ==
The commissioner selection process is designed to be open, fair, and impartial, and to select commissioners with demonstrated analytical ability, impartiality, and appreciation for California's diversity. Any registered California voter who has not changed party affiliation for the past five years before applying and who has voted in at least two of the prior three general elections may apply. The only role any elected official has in the selection process is the legislative leaders' right to strike a limited number of semifinalist applicants.

The selection process is conducted by the California State Auditor (CSA). The CSA conducts a statewide outreach and recruitment campaign to ensure as broad a pool of applicants as possible. Meanwhile, the CSA establishes an Applicant Review Panel (ARP) with three qualified senior auditors licensed by the California Board of Accountancy (Gov. Code, § 8252, subd. (b).) The ARP consists of one member each from the two largest parties in the state, and one member not affiliated with either of those two parties, each selected randomly from a sub-pool of qualified senior auditors. The ARP's meetings, applicant interviews, and deliberations are fully public.

The ARP conducts a preliminary screening against a detailed set of conflict-of-interest rules. Applicants and their immediate family members cannot be elected or appointed officials or political candidates for federal or state offices; staff members of such officials or candidates; officers, employees or paid consultants of a political party or members of a party central committee; registered lobbyists; paid congressional, legislative, or BOE staff; staff, consultants, or under contract with various state elected officials; or contributors of $2,000 or more (inflation-adjusted) to a congressional, state, or local political candidate, all currently or in the previous ten years before applying. (Once selected, commissioners must also remain qualified under the same rules, except that five years after selection they may hold appointive public office; serve on the staff or be a paid consultant the state Legislature, Congress, BOE, or to any individual legislator; or register as a lobbyist.) ARP panelist are subject to the same conflict-of-interest rules.

Applicants who are tentatively qualified are asked to submit supplemental applications, which require essays and letters of recommendation. The ARP evaluates applicants based on their “analytical skills, ability to be impartial, and appreciation for California’s diverse demographics and geography.” After further rounds of selection the ARP asks the remaining applicants to file California's Form 700 financial disclosures, listing income sources and ranges, real estate ownership, business and investment interests, major gifts received, loans, and travel payments.

ARP staff conduct background checks and social media scans so to further inform the selection process and to identify any items to follow up in the interviews. Of those who remain and who file Form 700, 120 are selected for 90-minute interviews (40 each from the three political sub-groups). Following those interviews, the ARP selects the most-qualified 60 applicants (20 from each of the three political subgroups) as semifinalists.

These 60 semifinalists are presented to the two leaders of each of the two largest parties in the Assembly and the State Senate, who are each allowed to strike two semifinalists from each of the three sub-pools of applicants, for a total of up to 24 strikes. As with peremptory challenges in a courtroom jury selection, no publicly stated reason or justification is required for these strikes. This is the one and only role the legislature (or any elected official) has in the commissioner selection process. In both the 2010 and 2020 cycles, the legislative leaders exercised their maximum allowable strikes, eliminating eight individuals from each of the three sub-pools of 20 applicants, leaving 12 Republicans, 12 Democrats, and 12 not affiliated with either major party, for 36 total finalists. In the 2020 cycle, one Democrat semifinalist withdrew from consideration, leaving 11 applicants in that sub-pool and 35 total finalists.

From these finalists, the CSA selects the first eight commissioners by conducting a random drawing from each sub-pool, choosing three from each of the two largest political parties and two not affiliated with either of those parties. Upon the selection of the first of the new commissioners, the terms of all 14 sitting commissioners ends.

The first eight commissioners then select the final six commissioners from among the remaining finalist pool, using these additional criteria:

The six appointees shall be chosen to ensure the commission reflects this state’s diversity, including but not limited to racial, ethnic, geographic, and gender diversity. However, it is not intended that formulas or specific ratios be applied for this purpose. Applicants shall also be chosen based on relevant analytical skills and ability to be impartial. (Gov. Code, § 8252, subd. (g).)

The final six must be proposed and approved as a single slate, and must be approved by a “supermajority” of the first eight (at least two votes from each of the two largest political parties and one vote not from those two parties).

In both the 2010 and 2020 cycles, all four commissioners not affiliated with the largest two political parties were Decline to State (pre-2010 terminology) or No Political Preference (terminology since 2010), though any could have been from a third party.

== Map-drawing process ==
The Voters First Act and Voters First Act for Congress amended Article XXI section 2(d) of the California Constitution to establish a set of rank-ordered criteria that the Commission followed to create new districts:

1. Population Equality: Districts must comply with the U.S. Constitution's requirement of “one person, one vote”
2. Federal Voting Rights Act: Districts must ensure an equal opportunity for minorities to elect a candidate of their choice
3. Geographic Contiguity: All areas within a district must be connected to each other, except for the special case of islands
4. Geographic Integrity: Districts shall minimize the division of cities, counties, local neighborhoods and communities of interests to the extent possible, without violating previous criteria. A community of interest is a contiguous population which shares common social and economic interests that should be included within a single district for purposes of its effective and fair representation.
5. Geographic Compactness: To the extent practicable, and where this does not conflict with previous criteria, districts must not bypass nearby communities for more distant communities
6. Nesting: To the extent practicable, and where this does not conflict with previous criteria, each Senate district will be composed of two whole Assembly districts, Board of Equalization districts will be composed of 10 Senate districts.

In addition, the location of incumbents and political candidates, and the partisan distribution of voters (except for specific and limited VRA compliance purposes) cannot be considered when drawing districts. There is no requirement that the CCRC consider the boundaries of past or present districts, or try to maximize political competitiveness in districts.

The commission is required to "conduct an open and transparent process enabling full public consideration of and comment on the drawing of district lines." In the 2010 cycle, the commission traveled throughout the state, holding 34 public meetings to receive input. In the 2020 cycle, because of pandemic travel and meeting restrictions, the commission received input via teleconference and telephone calls during virtual and hybrid meetings. For the 2020 cycle, California's Statewide Database developed and deployed an online map-drawing tool that enabled the public to draw and submit district map proposals directly to the commission, which was a first-time capability in a state redistricting program. In both cycles, the CCRC also received public input via email and postal mail.

The four final maps must be approved by a special supermajority of "at least nine affirmative votes which must include at least three votes of members registered from each of the two largest political parties in California based on registration and three votes from members who are not registered with either of these two political parties." Both the 2010 and 2020 CCRCs exceeded this supermajority final maps approval vote requirement; the 2020 CCRC's vote was unanimous.

== 2010 CCRC results ==
In response to a series of legal challenges, the California Supreme Court ruled unanimously three times in favor of the commission's maps, finding them in compliance with the U.S. Constitution and California Constitution. In addition, the U.S. Department of Justice granted pre-clearance of the commission's maps under Section 5 of the federal Voting Rights Act. The new districts took effect for the June 5, 2012, primary. Republican sponsors put a referendum on the Senate map on the November 6, 2012, ballot as Proposition 40, but later reversed their position and ceased opposing the new districts. A 2012 lawsuit by Ward Connerly challenging the CCRC's diversity provisions failed.

In an article about the 2010 cycle, ProPublica found evidence that the California Democratic Party leaders coordinated with community groups to testify in front of the commission, and concluded that these efforts had manipulated the process. While the California Republican Party was quick to call for an investigation, other political observers were less surprised and noted that similar Republican efforts during the hearing process were simply less effective. In a response to the story, the Commission stated that it "had its eyes wide open" and that "the Commissioners were not unduly influenced by that."

Independent studies by the Public Policy Institute of California, the National Journal, and Ballotpedia showed that the 2010 CCRC's maps included some of the most competitive districts in the nation, and created opportunities for new elected officials. For example, the uncertainty caused by the new districts combined with California's "top two" primary system resulted in half a dozen resignations of incumbent Congressional representatives on both sides of the aisle, a major shake-up of California's Capitol Hill delegation. In addition, it forced a number of intra-party races, most notably a showdown between two of the state's most powerful House Democrats, Representatives Howard Berman and Brad Sherman. In the prior 10 years, during the 2000 cycle, incumbents were so safe that only one Congressional seat changed party control in 255 elections, due to bipartisan gerrymandering after the redistricting following the 2000 census.

== 2020 CCRC results ==
The work of the 2020 CCRC has been analyzed by many organizations, including the League of Women Voters of California and Common Cause California, the Gerrymandering Project at Princeton University, Ballotpedia, the Public Policy Institute of California, and the Rose Institute.

== Commissioners ==
=== For the 2010 redistricting cycle ===
Commissioners
Image	Name	Home town	Party	Start	End
	Gabino Aguirre	Santa Paula	Democratic	December 15, 2010	July 2, 2020
	Vincent P. Barraba	Santa Cruz	Republican	December 6, 2010	July 2, 2020
	Maria Blanco	Berkeley	Democratic	December 15, 2010	July 2, 2020
	Cynthia Dai	San Francisco	Democratic	December 6, 2010	July 2, 2020
	Michelle R. DiGuilio	Stockton	Other (Decline-to-State)	December 15, 2010	July 2, 2020
	Stanley Forbes	Esparto	Other (Decline-to-State)	December 6, 2010	July 2, 2020
	Elaine Kuo Angelo Ancheta	Santa Clara County San Francisco	Democratic	December 6, 2010 February 10, 2011 (Note: Appointed to replace Elaine Kuo)	January 28, 2011 (Note: Resigned) July 2, 2020
	Connie Malloy	Pasadena	Other (Decline-to-State)	December 6, 2010	July 2, 2020
	Libert "Gil" R. Ontai	San Diego	Republican	December 15, 2010	July 2, 2020
	M. Andre Parvenu	Culver City	Other (Decline-to-State)	December 15, 2010	July 2, 2020
	Jeanne Raya	San Gabriel	Democratic	December 6, 2010	July 2, 2020
	Michael Ward	Anaheim	Republican	December 15, 2010	July 2, 2020
	Jodie Filkins Webber	Norco	Republican	December 6, 2010	July 2, 2020
	Peter Yao	Claremont	Republican	December 6, 2010	July 2, 2020

=== For the 2020 redistricting cycle ===
Note: with the passage of Proposition 14 in 2010, the nomenclature for voters who do not affiliate with a political party changed from "Decline to State" to "No Party Preference".

Commissioners
Image	Name	Home town	Party	Start	End
	Isra Ahmad	San Jose	Other (No Party Preference)	July 2, 2020	Incumbent
	Linda Akutagawa	Huntington Beach	Other (No Party Preference)	August 7, 2020	Incumbent
Picture of Commissioner Peter Blando	Jane Andersen Peter Blando	Berkeley West Sacramento	Republican	July 2, 2020 March 28, 2025 (Note: Appointed to complete Andersen's unexpired term)	December 28, 2024 (Note: Died in office) Incumbent
	Alicia Fernández	Clarksburg	Republican	August 7, 2020	Incumbent
	Neal Fornaciari	Tracy	Republican	July 2, 2020	Incumbent
	J. Ray Kennedy	Morongo Valley	Democratic	July 2, 2020	Incumbent
	Antonio Le Mons	Studio City	Other (No Party Preference)	July 2, 2020	Incumbent
	Sara Sadhwani	La Cañada Flintridge	Democratic	July 2, 2020	Incumbent
	Patricia Sinay	Encinitas	Democratic	August 7, 2020	Incumbent
	Derric Taylor	Los Angeles	Republican	July 2, 2020	Incumbent
	Pedro Toledo	Petaluma	Other (No Party Preference)	August 7, 2020	Incumbent
	Trena Turner	Stockton	Democratic	July 2, 2020	Incumbent
	Angela Vázquez	Los Angeles	Democratic	August 7, 2020	Incumbent
	Russell Yee	Oakland	Republican	August 7, 2020	Incumbent

== Legal basis ==
The CCRC is specifically governed by the following provisions in California law:

- California Constitution: Article XXI, sections 1–3, Redistricting of Senate, Assembly, Congressional and Board of Equalization Districts
- Government Code: Title 2, Division 1, Chapter 3.2, Sections 8251–53, Citizens Redistricting Commission
- Elections Code: Division 21, State and Local Reapportionment, Ch. 1, General Provisions, Section 21001 (Secretary of State final maps distribution), Section 21003 (Reallocation of incarcerated persons)
- California Code of Regulations: Title 2, Division 10, Sections 60800–60863, California State Auditor’s Office; Chapter 1, Redistricting, Subchapters 1, Definitions; 2, Applicant Review Panel; 3, Citizens Redistricting Commission

== Constitutionality ==
Opponents alleged California Proposition 20 had unconstitutionally transferred the power to draw congressional district lines from the California State Legislature to the redistricting commission. They argued the federal constitution prohibited the people from bypassing the state legislature and using ballot initiatives to make laws governing federal elections. The federal constitution provides, "The Times, Places and Manner of holding Elections for Senators and Representatives, shall be prescribed in each State by the Legislature thereof." (emphasis added).

On June 29, 2015, the U.S. Supreme Court upheld the constitutionality of an Arizona ballot initiative giving redistricting power to the Arizona Independent Redistricting Commission. Because the California and Arizona commissions were created in the same way and they had similar powers under state laws, it is widely understood that the ruling in the Arizona case has also implicitly upheld California Proposition 20 and the California Citizens Redistricting Commission.

== See also ==
- Redistricting in California
- Redistricting commission
- For the People Act
- John Lewis Voting Rights Act
