= 2008 California Proposition 11 =

Ballot initiative

Proposition 11
- November 4, 2008
- Creation of the California Citizens Redistricting Commission Initiative

Results
Choice	Votes	%
Yes	6,095,033	50.82%
No	5,897,655	49.18%
Valid votes	11,992,688	87.26%
Invalid or blank votes	1,750,489	12.74%
Total votes	13,743,177	100.00%
Registered voters/turnout	17,304,091	79.42%
County results
For
50–60%
Against
60–70%
50–60%

Proposition 11, also known as the Voters FIRST Act, was a law enacted in the U.S. state of California that placed the power to draw electoral boundaries for State Assembly and State Senate districts in a Citizens Redistricting Commission, as opposed to the State Legislature. To do this the Act amended both the Constitution of California and the Government Code. The law was proposed by means of the initiative process and was put to voters as part of the November 4, 2008 state elections. In 2010, voters passed Proposition 20 which extended the Citizen Redistricting Commission's power to draw electoral boundaries to include U.S. House seats as well.

== Provisions ==
The Act amended Article XXI of the state constitution and enacted Title 2, Division 1, Chapter 3.2 of the Government Code. These changes transfer authority for establishing Assembly, Senate, and Board of Equalization district boundaries from elected representatives to a fourteen-member commission. The commission is chosen as follows:

1. Government auditors select sixty registered voters from an applicant pool.
2. Legislative leaders are permitted to reduce the pool.
3. Auditors then pick eight commission members by lottery, and those commissioners pick six additional members for a total of fourteen.

The commission must include five commissioners of the largest political party in California (in practice the Democrats), five commissioners from the second largest party (currently the Republicans), and four of neither party. For approval, new district boundaries need votes from three commissioners of the largest party, three from the second largest, and three of the commissioners from neither party. The commission may hire lawyers and consultants to assist it in its work.

The state legislature retains responsibility for drawing district boundaries for California's Congressional Districts, but the Act adds additional criteria that the legislature must follow in drawing those boundaries.

== Supporters ==
California Common Cause was the advocacy group sponsoring the initiative.

=== Others supporting the initiative include ===
- AARP
- NAACP California State Conference
- The Los Angeles Chamber of Commerce
- The League of Women Voters
- Gov. Arnold Schwarzenegger (Republican)
- Former Governor Gray Davis (Democrat)
- Former State Controller Steve Westly
- California Chamber of Commerce
- California Common Cause
- California Forward Action Fund
- California Business Roundtable
- ACLU - Southern California
- Bay Area Council
- Bay Area Leadership Council
- California Black Chamber of Commerce
- California Police Chiefs Association
- League of California Cities
- California Democratic Council
- California Republican Assembly
- California Small Business Association
- California Taxpayers' Association
- California Conference of Carpenters
- Central California Hispanic Chamber of Commerce
- IndependentVoice.Org
- National Federation of Independent Business, California
- North San Diego County NAACP
- Neighborhoods for Clean Elections
- Santa Clara Cities Association
- Silicon Valley Leadership Group
- Small Business Action Committee
- California Association of Health Underwriters

=== Newspaper Editorial boards in favor ===
- The Los Angeles Times
- The San Francisco Chronicle
- San Jose Mercury News
- Fresno Bee
- The Torrance Daily Breeze
- San Diego Union Tribune
- Pasadena Now
- LA Daily News
- North County Times
- Stockton Record
- San Gabriel Valley Tribune
- Santa Cruz Sentinel
- Lompoc Record

=== Arguments in favor of Prop. 11 ===
Notable arguments that have been made in favor of Prop. 11 include:

- Under current law the legislature draws its own districts which results in 99 percent of incumbents being re-elected
- Partisan gridlock caused by the current way of drawing legislative districts has caused the legislature to underperform in its mission of serving the people of California.,
- State legislative contests held in districts drawn by a Proposition 11 commission would be more competitive, leading to voters electing more moderate legislators.

=== Donors supporting Prop 11 ===
As of September 24, three campaign committees supporting Prop. 11 have filed officially with the Secretary of State's office. Some donors have contributed to more than one of these committees. The largest donors altogether are:

- Gov. Schwarzenegger's California Dream Team, $2,446,000.
- Charles Munger Jr., son of billionaire Charles Munger, $1 million
- Michael Bloomberg (the mayor of New York City), $250,000.
- Howard Lester (of Williams-Sonoma), $250,000.
- Brian Harvey, president of Cypress Land Company, $250,000.
- Reed Hastings, founder of Netflix, $250,000
- New Majority California PAC, $237,500.
- Meg Whitman, CEO, eBay, $200,000.
- William Bloomfield, $150,000

=== City of Pasadena endorses ===
On Monday, March 10, 2008 the Pasadena City Council became the first California city to endorse the proposition.

=== Path to the ballot ===
Kimball Petition Management was paid $2,332,988 from two separate campaign committees to collect signatures to put this measure on the ballot. Signatures to qualify the measure for the California 2008 ballot measures|November 2008 ballot were submitted to election officials on May 6, 2008. On June 17, the California Secretary of State announced that a check of the signatures had established that the measure qualifies for the ballot.,

=== Supporters file campaign financing complaint ===
In late August, supporters of Prop. 11 filed a complaint with the Fair Political Practices Commission because the California Correctional Peace Officers Association—a group that opposes Prop. 11—gave contributions totaling $577,000 to the Leadership California committee, which is a campaign committee associated with state senate leader Don Perata. The Prop. 11 group said that it was wrong for the police officers union to give the money to the Perata committee rather than directly to the No on 11, and also alleged that the police union was trying to curry favor with Perata. Days later, the FPPC took the rare step of rejecting the complaint without conducting an investigation.

== Opposition ==
The official committee set up to oppose Proposition 11 was called "Citizens for Accountability; No on Proposition 11". Paul Hefner is the spokesman for the "No on 11" effort.

=== Opponents to Prop. 11 include ===
- U.S. Senator Barbara Boxer
- House Speaker Nancy Pelosi
- the California Democratic Party
- the Mexican American Legal Defense and Education Fund
- the NAACP Defense Fund
- the Asian-American Pacific Legal Center

=== Arguments against Prop. 11 ===
Arguments that have been claimed in opposition to Prop. 11 include:

- No accountability to taxpayers. Each commission member is guaranteed $300 a day, plus unlimited expenses in the form of staffing, offices, etc.
- The commission created under Prop. 11 would allow politicians to hide behind the selected bureaucrats to maintain a hold on redistricting as they wish.
- The overly complicated process created by Prop. 11 would make it easier to mask hidden agendas of the people behind those on the committee.
- Prop. 11 offers no assurance of the same representation for communities, such as California's Hispanic community in the redistricting process.
- The current version of Prop. 11 does not include congressional districts as an earlier draft did, thereby not being complete reform and creating additional detractors to the measure.
- Even when commissions do create competitive districts, the people who get elected in them do not necessarily behave as political moderates.

=== Democrat against Democrat ===
Kathay Feng, the main author of the initiative, and director of California Common Cause, said in late June that since the measure qualified for the ballot and the California Democratic Party had announced its opposition, there had been an attempt to bring everybody into line and to encourage those in support of the measure to oppose it.

=== Donations to opposition campaign ===
As of September 24, the opposition committee, "Citizens for Accountability; No on 11", had raised $350,000:

- California Democratic Party, $75,000.
- California Correctional Peace Officers Association, Truth in American Government Fund, $250,000.
- Members' Voice of the State Building Trades, $25,000.
- "Voter's First" campaign committee, $40,000

== Polling information ==
A poll released on July 22, 2008 by Field Poll showed Proposition 11 with 42% support and 30% opposition. A late August poll released by the Public Policy Institute of California showed Prop. 11 with 39% of voters in support.

Month of poll	Polling company	In favor	Opposed	Undecided
July 2008	Field	42%	30%	28%
August 2008	PPIC	39%	36%	25%
Sept. 2008	PPIC	38%	33%	29%

== Result of vote ==
Electoral results by county.

Proposition 11
Choice	Votes	%
For	6,095,033	50.82
Against	5,897,655	49.18
Total	11,992,688	100.00
Valid votes	11,992,688	87.26
Invalid/blank votes	1,750,489	12.74
Total votes	13,743,177	100.00
Registered voters/turnout		79.42
