= Governorship of Arnold Schwarzenegger =

Tenure of the 38th Governor of California

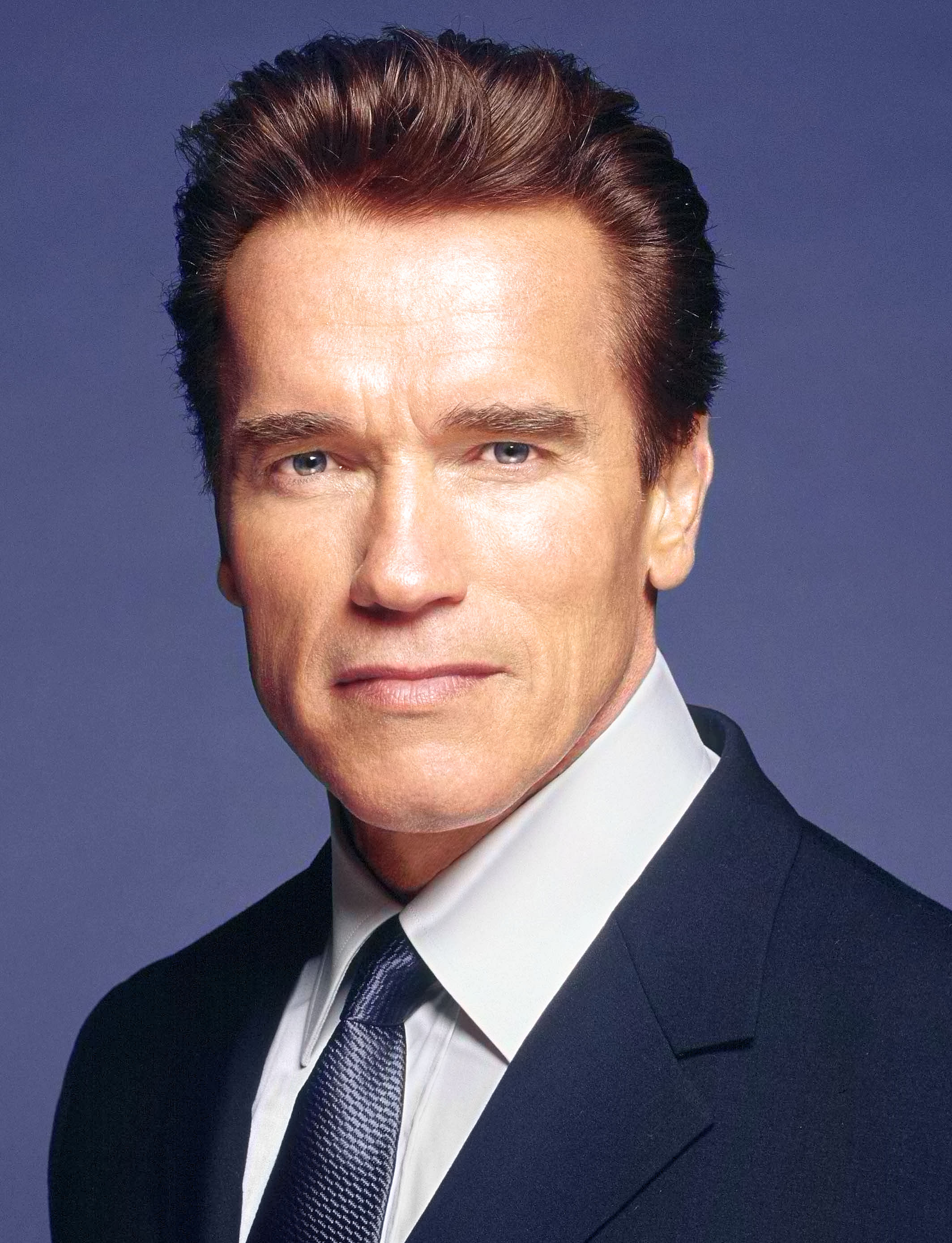
- 2003 gubernatorial portrait
- Governorship of Arnold Schwarzenegger; November 17, 2003 – January 3, 2011
- Governor: Arnold Schwarzenegger
- Party: Republican
- Election: 2003, 2006
- Seal of California

Arnold Schwarzenegger took office as the 38th governor of California in a 2003 recall election. He was subsequently elected Governor when the previous governor Gray Davis was recalled and Schwarzenegger placed first among replacement candidates. Schwarzenegger served the remainder of Davis' incomplete term between 2003 and 2007. Schwarzenegger was then reelected to a second term in 2006, serving out this full term and leaving office in January 2011. Schwarzenegger was unable to run for a third term due to term limits imposed by the Constitution of California.

At the start of his first term as governor, Schwarzenegger proposed deep cuts in the state budget and was met with opposition in the California State Legislature. When San Francisco started granting same-sex marriage licenses at the behest of mayor Gavin Newsom, the governor ordered state attorney general Bill Lockyer to intervene in the matter and vetoed legislation that would have legalized same-sex marriage. Because of their opposition to his budget cuts, Schwarzenegger controversially called his opponents in the legislature "girlie men". At the 2004 Republican National Convention, Schwarzenegger gave a speech endorsing the reelection of George W. Bush as president of the United States. In his State of the State address in 2005, Schwarzenegger proposed a redistricting reform that would have retired judges drawing new districts for the state. The first executions of Schwarzenegger's term occurred in 2005 with Donald Beardslee in January and Stanley Williams in December, which drew opposition from opponents of capital punishment and his native country of Austria. In June, the governor called for a special election in an effort to pass several of his proposed reforms. However, the voters ultimately rejected all of Schwarzenegger's propositions. Schwarzenegger started off 2006 by apologizing for holding the special election, which had cost the state money, and proposed a centrist agenda moving forward. The governor opposed the federal government's effort to build fencing on the Mexico–United States border and likened it to the Berlin Wall. In 2006, Schwarzenegger made several efforts to address global warming by signing the Global Warming Solutions Act of 2006 and negotiating the creation of a carbon emissions trading market with British Prime Minister Tony Blair. By year's end, the governor called on the federal government to give a deadline for the withdrawal of U.S. troops from Iraq.

On November 7, 2006, Schwarzenegger defeated Democratic state treasurer Phil Angelides in the 2006 California gubernatorial election, winning a second term as governor. In his second term, Schwarzenegger pledged to be a centrist politician and cooperate with the Democrats to resolve statewide political issues. Only days into the term, the governor proposed universal health insurance in the state and called for new bonds for schools, prisons, and other infrastructure. In May 2007, Schwarzenegger met with two of his counterparts in Canada, Dalton McGuinty and Gordon Campbell, in order to address climate change and advocate for stem cell research. In 2008, Schwarzenegger proposed a balanced budget amendment to the state constitution.

Also in his second term, Schwarzenegger proposed an austere fiscal policy in response to the Great Recession. Continuing his efforts to address environmental issues, the governor signed a memorandum of understanding with Mexican President Felipe Calderón and signed legislation pertaining to global warming. However, by October, Schwarzenegger vetoed 35 percent of the bills that the California State Legislature passed, which was the highest the rate had ever been since the statistic was first tracked when Ronald Reagan was governor of the state. In the election, voters approved Proposition 11, which shifted redistricting powers away from the legislature and created the California Citizens Redistricting Commission. In the midst of the Great Recession in 2009, Schwarzenegger called upon the legislature to pass deep budget cuts and warned that the state was facing insolvency. At the same time, the governor approved of President Barack Obama's federal stimulus bill. Schwarzenegger appointed Laura Chick as inspector general to oversee California's share of the stimulus bill. In May, the governor voiced his openness to marijuana legalization and a special election resulted in all but one of his state propositions being rejected.

== Background ==
=== Pre-gubernatorial politics ===
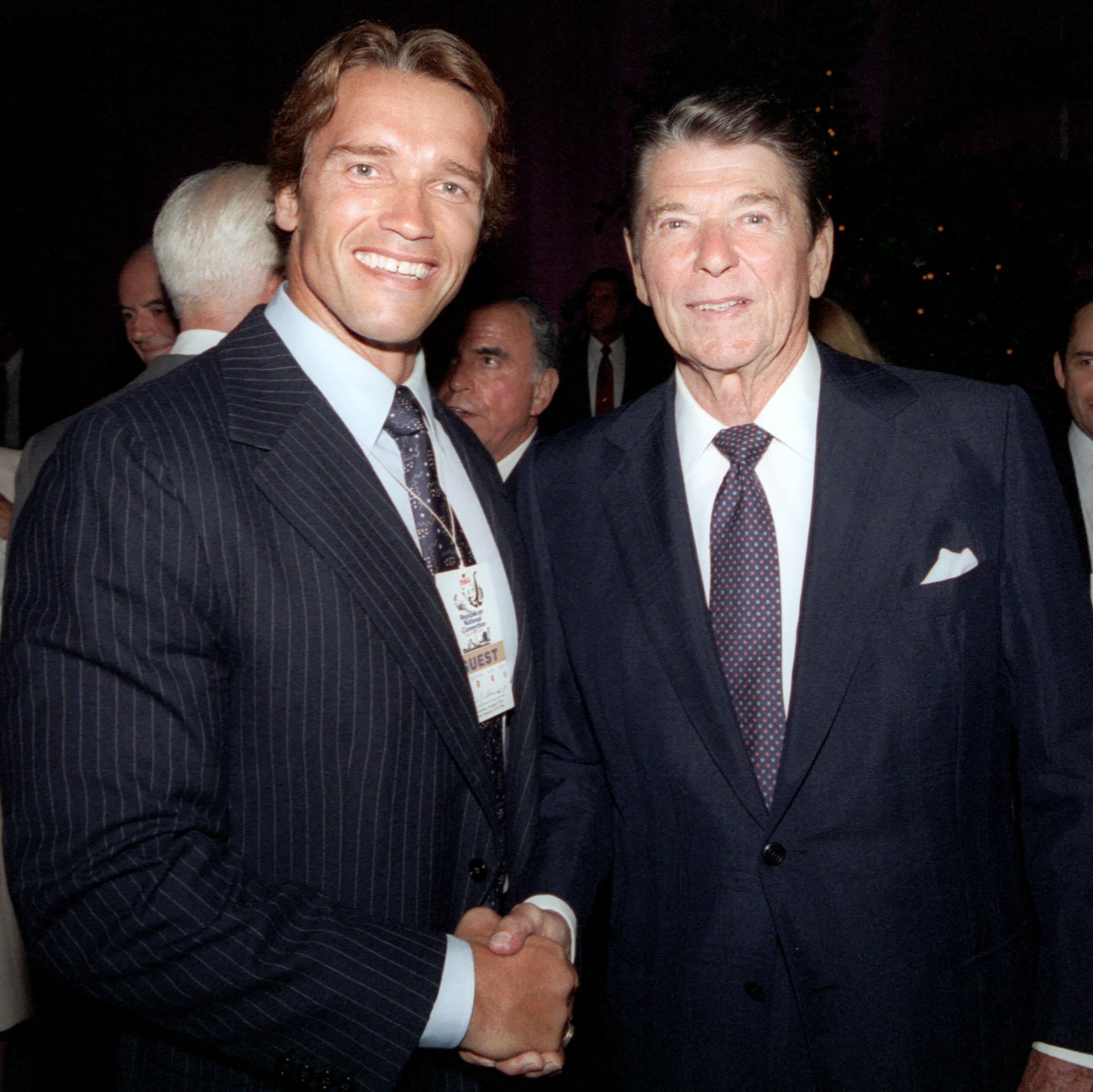
Schwarzenegger with President Ronald Reagan at the 1984 Republican National Convention in Dallas

Prior to his 2003 run for governor, Schwarzenegger had had occasional involvement in politics.

In Austria, Schwarzenegger was officially a member of the youth weightlifting team of the Austrian People's Party (ÖVP).

In 1985, Schwarzenegger appeared in "Stop the Madness", an anti-drug music video sponsored by the Reagan administration. He first came to wide public notice as a Republican during the 1988 presidential election, accompanying then-Vice President George H. W. Bush at a campaign rally.

=== Campaign in the 2003 gubernatorial recall election ===
Schwarzenegger was elected in the recall election that unseated Democratic governor Gray Davis.

=== Transition into office ===
On November 17, 2003, Schwarzenegger was sworn in as the 38th governor of California.

== Electoral politics and national political activities ==
Schwarzenegger actively supported the reelection campaign of President George W. Bush in the 2004 United States presidential election. Schwarzenegger gave a speech at the 2004 Republican National Convention on August 31 at Madison Square Garden, closing his speech by remarking, "George W. Bush has worked hard to protect and preserve the American dream for all of us. And that's why I say, send him back to Washington for four more years." On October 29, 2004 Schwarzenegger appeared at a reelection campaign rally for President George W. Bush in Columbus, Ohio, saying, "I am here to pump you up to reelect President George W. Bush."

On November 2, 2006 Schwarzenegger urged for a deadline to withdraw American troops from Iraq. On September 12, 2007, Schwarzenegger vetoed a bill that would have allowed Californians to vote in a nonbonding referendum on whether they favored an immediate withdrawal of U.S. troops from Iraq.

At the California Republican Party convention in Indian Wells on September 7, Schwarzenegger warned his fellow Republicans about how they were faring with the electorate, remarking that "in movie terms, we are dying at the box office. We are not filling the seats."

On January 31, 2008, Schwarzenegger endorsed U.S. Senator John McCain’s campaign for the Republican nomination in the 2008 United States presidential election. Marking a household split, on February 3, 2008, Schwarzenegger's wife, California First Lady Maria Shriver, endorsed U.S. Senator Barack Obama's campaign for president in the Democratic primaries. After John McCain (by then the Republican nominee) called for an end to the federal ban on offshore drilling on June 16, 2008 Schwarzenegger and other governors promised on June 18 to block attempts to tap offshore petroleum reserves, citing concerns about the environment and tourism. In a taped interview on Meet the Press on June 29, Schwarzenegger defended McCain, calling him "the real deal on the environment".

As part of a bipartisan group of governors on February 24, 2008, Schwarzenegger called on George W. Bush, the U.S. Congress, and the presidential candidates to back a major spending program to repair the nation's roads, bridges, rail lines, and water systems.

It was reported on April 12, 2009 that Schwarzenegger and Democratic Pennsylvania Governor Ed Rendell sent a private memo to Obama saying he needs to assert more political leadership instead of leaving it to Congress to draft a plan for improving the nation's aging highways, bridges, and ports.

=== Ballot measures ===
In 2004, Schwarzenegger urged Californians to vote against Proposition 70, which would allow the expansion of casinos in return for payments on par with state corporate taxes, saying, "The Indians are ripping us off." On October 18, 2004, he endorsed Propositions 62 and 71, the former of which would establish open primary elections and the latter of which would authorize the sale of $3 billion in bonds and the creation of a state institute that would award grants to stem cell researchers. At a rally in Los Angeles on October 28, 2004 Schwarzenegger joined three former California governors, including his predecessor Gray Davis, to voice his opposition to Proposition 66, which would have augmented the state's three-strikes law.

==== 2005 special election on ballot measures ====
Schwarzenegger announced on June 13, 2005 that a special election would occur on November 8 of that year for voters to decide on a package of government reforms he championed on how Californian spends state tax dollars and how Californians elect their politicians. In the special election, all four of Schwarzenegger's signature ballot proposals (Propositions 74, 75, 76, and 77) were rejected by the voters as well as four other initiatives. After learning that at least two of his initiatives had failed, Schwarzenegger told supporters, "Tomorrow, we begin anew. I feel the same tonight as that night two years ago...You know with all my heart, I want to do the right thing for the people of California." On January 5, 2006, Schwarzenegger gave a State of the State address in which he apologized to the voters of California for sponsoring the costly special election and proposed a series of policies that represented a dramatic return to the political center.

=== 2006 reelection ===
In February 2006, Steve Schmidt and Matthew Dowd were respectively named the campaign manager and chief strategist for Schwarzenegger's reelection campaign. On April 14, Schwarzenegger's reelection campaign released his federal and state tax returns for 2002–2004 after State Controller Steve Westly and State Treasurer Phil Angelides, both Democratic contenders for the governorship, released theirs. On June 6, Schwarzenegger won nearly 90 percent of the vote in the Republican gubernatorial primary election without serious opposition.

On September 13, 2006, Angelides admitted to leaking a controversial tape of Schwarzenegger to the media. Katie Levinson, the communications director for the Schwarzenegger campaign called the action "unethical at best, criminal at worst". On October 7, Schwarzenegger participated in a debate with Angelides, who had won the Democratic nomination. On October 12, Schwarzenegger appeared on The Tonight Show with Jay Leno. The appearance drew criticism because Angelides was not provided a similar media opportunity. While the Democratic Party gained six governorships in the 2006 elections, Schwarzenegger managed to defeat Angelides in the general election on November 7.

== Political positions ==
Schwarzenegger is a member of the Republican Party. On September 7, 2007, Schwarzenegger said, "I am proud to be a member of the party of Abraham Lincoln. I am proud to be a member of the party of Ronald Reagan."

When Schwarzenegger was inaugurated for his second term on January 5, 2007, he pledged to work as a centrist by creating an era of "post-partisanship" that he claimed would bring all Californians together to solve the state's problems.

The New Yorker's Connie Bruck called Schwarzenegger "supermoderate". Andrew Gumbel of The Independent wrote, "[Schwarzenegger is] a man of surprises. He mixes in the social circles of Hollywood's liberal elite...yet he has always regarded himself as a staunch Republican—among other things, an act of rebellion against the staunch social democratic values of his native Austria." Los Angeles Times writer Joe Mathews wrote that Schwarzenegger routinely sides with business and asserts quasi-libertarian views on individual freedom but has crossed borders and associated with groups whose experiences seem foreign to his own. Daniel Weintraub of the San Francisco Chronicle wrote, "[Schwarzenegger] is liberal on some issues, conservative on others and, sometimes, but not always, in the middle."

=== Ratings ===
In October 2003, On the Issues rated Schwarzenegger as a "moderate liberal populist". In April 2008, the organization reclassified Schwarzenegger as a "centrist". In a 2010 report published by Equality California, an LGBT rights organization, Schwarzenegger received a 57 percent score. On April 21, 2010, Citizens for Responsibility and Ethics in Washington named Schwarzenegger and ten other governors as the "worst governors", accusing him of self-enrichment, cozying up with special interests, conflicts of interest, cronyism, pressuring state officials, mismanagement, and vetoing hospital transparency bills.

In 2004, the California League of Conservation Voters, an environmental organization, released a scorecard giving Schwarzenegger a 58%. Schwarzenegger would receive the same score in 2005. In 2006, his score fell to 50%. Schwarzenegger's score improved to 63% in 2007. In 2008, Schwarzenegger received a 60% score. In 2009, Schwarzenegger's score from the CLCV fell to its lowest ever, falling to 28%. However, Schwarzenegger's score would recover in 2010, improving to 56%. As governor of California, Schwarzenegger's lifetime score from the CLCV is 53%.

In March 2005, the Cato Institute, an American libertarian think tank, issued a "fiscal policy report card" for 2004 in which it assigned an A grade to Schwarzenegger's performance as governor. Schwarzenegger was given a D grade in the 2006 report card from the Cato Institute. In the 2008 report card, Schwarzenegger was given a C grade. In 2010, Schwarzenegger received a D grade in the report card.

== Use of veto power ==
As a Republican governor in a state with Democratic majorities in both chambers of its state legislature, Schwarzenegger made use of his veto power.

On September 27, 2008, Schwarzenegger signed and vetoed about a hundred bills each, facing a September 30 deadline at which unsigned bills automatically became law. On the next day, Schwarzenegger vetoed 131 bills, twice as many as he had signed. By October 2008, Schwarzenegger had declined to sign 415 of the 1,187 bills that had appeared on his desk that year, a rate of 35 percent. This was the highest since state officials began tracking that statistic when Ronald Reagan was governor.

== Appointments and staffing ==
On April 30, 2005, Schwarzenegger appointed Alan Bersin, the superintendent of San Diego Unified School District, to serve as the state education secretary. In March 2007, Schwarzenegger appointed David Long, Riverside County's superintendent of schools since 1999, to the position of state secretary of education.

On November 30, 2005 Schwarzenegger named Public Utilities Commissioner Susan Kennedy, a Democrat, as his new chief of staff, replacing Patricia Clarey. In a news conference, Schwarzenegger said, "[Kennedy is] a woman that is known as being a hardworking woman, dedicated, and is willing to work whatever it takes to get the job done."

On September 4, 2007, Schwarzenegger named former federal prosecutor Paul Seave, a Democrat, to be his new director of gang and youth violence policy.

On January 24, 2008, the State Senate rejected Schwarzenegger's nomination of Judith Case to the California Air Resources Board by a party-line vote of 20–15 after Democratic lawmakers questioned her commitment to fighting for cleaner air.

On March 20, 2008, Schwarzenegger removed Clint Eastwood and Bobby Shriver, his brother-in-law, from the state parks commission, where both had served since before Schwarzenegger took office.

On March 18, 2009, Schwarzenegger appointed former Assemblyman Fred Aguiar as secretary of the SCSA.

On April 3, 2009, Schwarzenegger appointed Laura Chick to the newly created office of inspector general to oversee its share of the $787 billion from the federal economic stimulus package.

=== Judicial appointments ===
On December 9, 2005 Schwarzenegger nominated Carol Corrigan, a moderate Republican, to the state Supreme Court to fill the vacancy created by the departure of Janice Rogers Brown.

Schwarzenegger made eighteen judicial appointments on August 20, 2007 that included a substantially greater mix of women and minorities than previous appointments of his. He had been sharply criticized earlier in the year for having previously named mostly white men to the bench.

== Fiscal matters ==
Schwarzenegger's first action as governor was to return the state's vehicle registration fee to 0.65 percent of a car's value, after it had previously been raised to 2 percent on October 1, 2003.

It was announced on December 12, 2003 that Schwarzenegger and the California State Legislature reached an agreement that put on the ballot a bond issue to finance as much as $15 billion in debt and a constitutional spending limit. On December 18, Schwarzenegger declared a fiscal crisis and said he would bypass the legislature to impose $150 million in spending cuts.

On January 6, 2004, Schwarzenegger gave his first State of the State address in which he warned voters to expect deep budget cuts and urged them to support $15 billion in bonds. In the budget proposal that he presented on January 9, Schwarzenegger's plan was to cut spending by more than $4.6 billion, with the largest reduction, roughly $2.7 billion, coming from health and human services programs. Acknowledging that the reductions would be painful to many of the poorest Californians, Schwarzenegger said "irresponsible" spending by his predecessor forced his hand.

On July 17, 2004, Schwarzenegger called state legislators girlie men and called upon voters to "terminate" them at the polls in November if they didn't pass his $103 billion budget. Amid Democratic criticism of these remarks, Schwarzenegger's spokesperson said on July 19 that no apology would be forthcoming. On July 31, Schwarzenegger signed a $78.8 billion budget, which was a $32 billion reduction over five years.

Schwarzenegger signed agreements with five Native American tribes on June 21, 2004 that administration officials said would provide $275 million a year for the state's general fund—representing about 15 percent of the tribes' profits.

On May 9, 2007, Schwarzenegger's office announced that eleven California-based companies signed contracts worth $3 billion with Chinese companies in a move to expand trade between the U.S. state and China.

On May 26, 2005 Schwarzenegger travelled to San Jose, California, to fill a pothole dug by city crews just a few hours before, as part of an attempt to dramatize his efforts to increase funding for transportation projects.

Schwarzenegger announced on June 13, 2005 that a special election would be held on November 8 of that year for voters to decide on a package of government reforms he championed on state spending and elections. In the special election, all four of Schwarzenegger's signature ballot proposals were rejected by the voters along with four other initiatives.

In his fourth annual State of the State address on January 9, 2007, Schwarzenegger called for $43.3 billion in new bond spending for schools, prisons, and other infrastructure.

Schwarzenegger gave his fifth State of the State address on January 8, 2008, in which he proposed a balanced budget amendment, a constitutional amendment prohibiting the state from spending more than it collects in taxes.

On January 11, 2008, Schwarzenegger proposed austerity measures by taking billions of dollars from public schools, shutting down four-dozen state parks, and releasing tens of thousands of prisoners. At the same time, the governor declared a fiscal emergency and called a special session of the state legislature to trim the current year's spending.

Schwarzenegger signed six bills on February 16, 2008 that aimed at reducing at least part of the state's $14.5 billion deficit that stretches over two fiscal years. On February 19, 2008, Schwarzenegger signed an executive order requiring state agencies to make additional spending cuts that total $100 million as part of an effort to help solve the state's fiscal crisis.

On April 24, 2008, Schwarzenegger predicted that California would face a budget deficit of more than $10 billion in the upcoming fiscal year.

On September 23, 2008, Schwarzenegger signed the state's budget, ending an 85-day deadlock over how to close the state's $15.2 billion deficit.

On July 9, 2008, Schwarzenegger signed a bill that aimed to keep many homeowners from losing their properties to foreclosure. On July 31, 2008, Schwarzenegger ordered pay for up to 200,000 state workers, cut state worker's minimum, minimum wage, and laid off more than 10,000 others, blaming a looming cash crisis. Schwarzenegger proposed a one-cent sales tax increase on August 4, framing it as a temporary sacrifice to be recouped by Californians in years to come.

On August 6, 2008, Schwarzenegger said that he wouldn't sign any bills until the legislature passed a budget. Schwarzenegger sued Controller John Chiang on August 11, aiming to force the unpaid furlough of 15,600 more state workers two days a month. Even though he earlier promised to not sign any bills, Schwarzenegger signed a measure on August 26 for a statewide bullet train system that he strongly supported. On October 27, Schwarzenegger said he would call a special legislative session to address the state's budget a day after the November 4 elections.

On December 1, 2008, Schwarzenegger declared a fiscal emergency, calling for fast legislative action to alleviate the state's $11.2 billion shortfall in revenue, "Without immediate action our state is headed for a fiscal disaster and that is why with more than two dozen new legislators sworn in today—I am wasting no time in calling a fiscal emergency special session."

On December 18, 2008, Schwarzenegger promised to veto a budget bill that he said would cut spending too little, raise taxes and fees too much, and shortchange economic stimulus programs. Schwarzenegger called on the legislature on December 19 to convene a new special legislative session to address the state's fiscal crisis and ordered layoffs and mandatory unpaid time off for state workers as a money-saving measure.

On January 6, 2009, Schwarzenegger vetoed an $18 billion deficit-cutting package with his spokesperson saying that it did not meet the governor's demands for making more cuts, streamlining government, and creating an economic stimulus. In a January 7 news conference, Schwarzenegger said, "I cannot go out and get Republican votes when I wouldn't vote for it." On January 15, Schwarzenegger gave an unusually terse State of the State address in which he warned that the legislature must agree on a budget solution before the state faced insolvency.

On January 28, 2009 Schwarzenegger threatened to dismiss state workers if a judge or employee unions blocked his plan to furlough thousands of workers two days a month beginning the next week. After a judge ruled on January 29 that the governor had the legal authority to order workers to take time off without pay, Schwarzenegger told statewide elected officials on January 30 furlough state workers two days a month.

On February 6, more than 200,000 state employees had to take the day off without pay to help ease California's budget crisis. Schwarzenegger signed a budget bill on February 20 raising $12.8 billion in new taxes. On February 20, Schwarzenegger called the federal stimulus plan a "terrific package" and said he was "more than happy" to take money from any governor that declined to accept aid from the stimulus.

On March 27, 2009, Schwarzenegger signed five bills that would allow California to receive more than $17.5 billion in federal economic stimulus aid.

On May 14, 2009, Schwarzenegger unveiled a budget proposal planning to close a huge budget deficit with deeper cuts to education and health programs and by borrowing billions more dollars.

== Environmentalism ==
Schwarzenegger attended an energy conference on November 16, 2005, where he urged diplomats and business leaders to forge ties that would reduce the world's dependence on oil and increase energy efficiency.

Schwarzenegger signed the Sustainable Oceans Act on May 26, 2006, which made California the first U.S. state to adopt comprehensive controls on future fish farming in its coastal waters.

Schwarzenegger met with New York City mayor Michael Bloomberg in Sunnyvale, California, on September 21, 2006 to discuss California's sustainability initiatives. On September 27, Schwarzenegger signed into law the Global Warming Solutions Act of 2006 and said the effort kicked off "a bold new era of environmental protection".

On April 11, 2007 Schwarzenegger gave a speech at a conference in Washington, D.C., where he said, "For too long the environmental movement was powered by guilt, and that doesn't work. The movement can't nag or scold, but must be a positive force." Schwarzenegger also said the environmental movement must become "hip and sexy" if it is to succeed. On April 25, Schwarzenegger threatened to sue the United States Environmental Protection Agency if it failed to act soon on a state bid to crack down on greenhouse gas emissions from cars.

Schwarzenegger met Ontario premier Dalton McGuinty on May 30, 2007, when the two signed deals to fight climate change and boost stem cell research. The governor then met Canadian Prime Minister Stephen Harper, who he swapped hockey jerseys with. On May 31, 2007, Schwarzenegger and British Columbia premier Gordon Campbell signed a memorandum of understanding on climate change in Vancouver, setting targets for greenhouse gas emissions below 1990 levels.

On July 31, 2006, Schwarzenegger and United Kingdom Prime Minister Tony Blair agreed to create a market for the trading of carbon emissions, and share economic and scientific research on climate change and non-polluting technology.

On September 24, 2007 Schwarzenegger addressed the United Nations. In his remarks, he said that he believed rich and poor nations needed to get over their disagreements about how to fight climate change and forge a new pact to replace the Kyoto Protocol.

On November 8, 2007, Schwarzenegger, with the backing of state Attorney General Jerry Brown, sued the Bush administration pursuing California exercising the ability to impose its own automobile clean air standards. Schwarzenegger said that he was prepared to "sue again and sue again" until California received permission to impose its own tough standards on automakers to curb global warming. Schwarzenegger announced on December 20, 2007 plans to sue the federal government over its decision not to allow a California plan to reduce greenhouse gas emissions. On January 2, 2008, California sued the Environmental Protection Agency, challenging its recent decision to block California rules curbing greenhouse gas emissions from new cars and trucks.

On February 14, 2008 Schwarzenegger and Mexican President Felipe Calderón signed a memorandum of understanding to formalize a working relationship on environmental issues such as air-quality monitoring.

Schwarzenegger filed a lawsuit against the United States Forest Service on February 28, 2008 for adopting a management plan that would allow road construction and oil drilling in California's largest national forests, saying, "We are forced to once again stand up for California's forests. Despite repeated attempts to ensure that the United States Forest Service honor its written assurances that California's roadless areas would be protected, they have failed to do so."

At a Yale University climate conference on April 18, 2008, Schwarzenegger signed a pledge with 17 other U.S. states to pressure Congress and the next president to quickly adopt aggressive limits on greenhouse gas emissions.

Before the midnight deadline to sign bills on September 30, 2008 before they automatically became law without his signature, Schwarzenegger signed a bill aimed at helping the state fight global warming by better coordinating local planning efforts to curb suburban sprawl.

On November 14, 2008, Schwarzenegger signed an executive order directing state agencies to study the effects of global warming and recommend how the state needs to adapt to such changes in land use planning and building new infrastructure.

After the California Air Resources Board voted unanimously to adopt the nation's most comprehensive anti-global warming plan on December 11, 2008, Schwarzenegger said that California was providing a road map for the rest of the country.

With California having been refused a waiver from less-stringent national standards in 2007 under the Bush presidency, new president Barack Obama ordered his environmental officials on January 26, 2009 to immediately review California's regulation, a move that was praised by Schwarzenegger as "a great victory for California and for cleaning the air around the nation for generations to come".

Schwarzenegger traveled to Washington, D.C. on May 19, 2009 to celebrate a victory on clean air with Obama.

== Automobile policies ==
Soon after being inaugurated as governor in November 2003, Schwarzenegger's first action as governor was returning the vehicle registration fee to 0.65 percent of a car's value, after it had previously been raised to 2 percent on October 1, 2003.

In 2004, Schwarzenegger initiated the California Hydrogen Highway plan to create infrastructure to support hydrogen fuel-powered transport.

On September 15, 2006, Schwarzenegger signed into law a bill that made California the fourth U.S. state to ban motorists from holding cell phones while driving. On September 13, 2007, Schwarzenegger signed a bill that banned cell phone use for drivers under the age of 18. On September 24, 2008, Schwarzenegger signed a bill that made it illegal to read or send text messages while driving in California.

Schwarzenegger sued the Bush Administration in a dispute on whether California was allowed to impose its own clean air standards on automobiles.

== LGBTQ matters ==
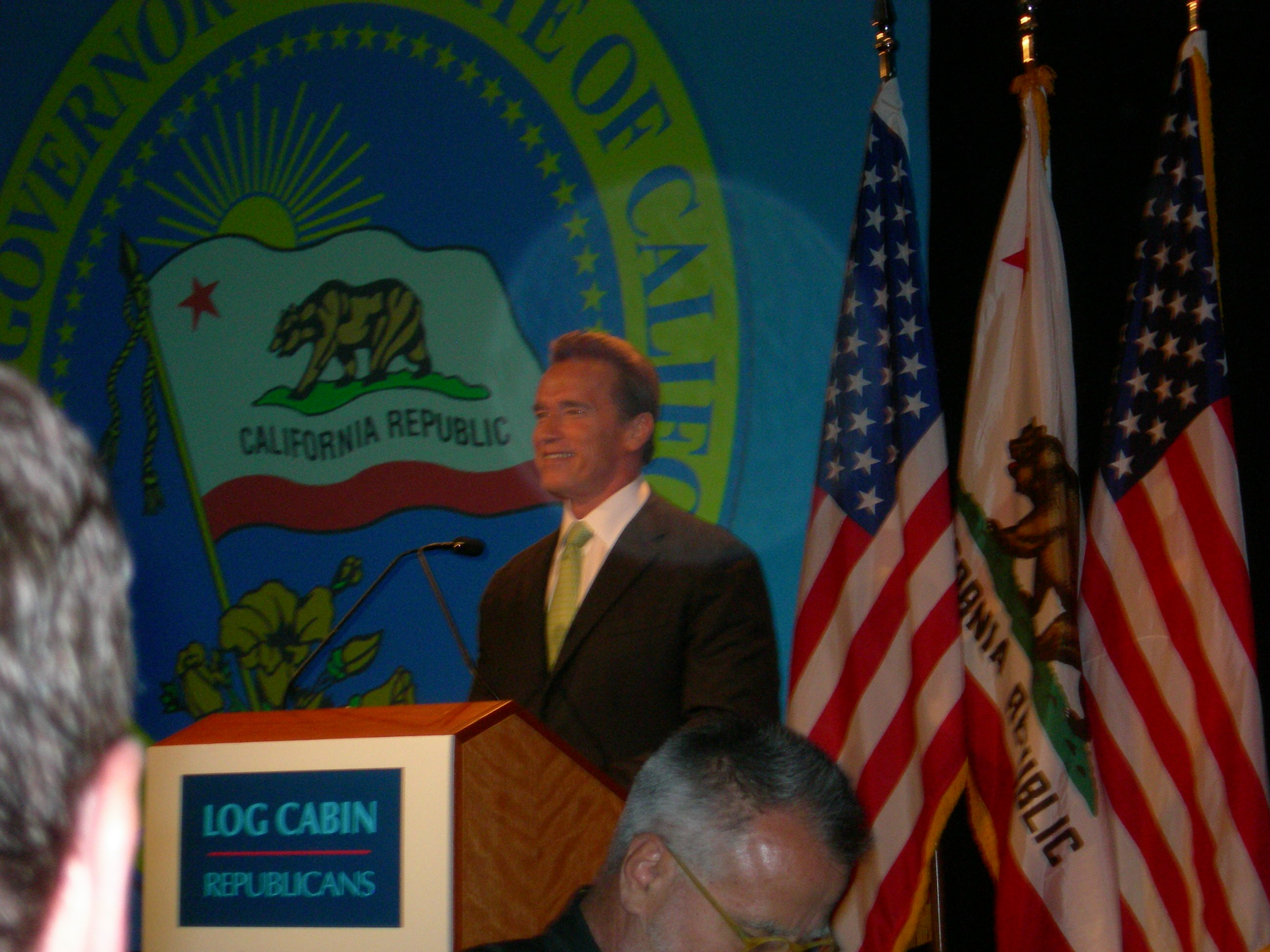
Schwarzenegger at a Log Cabin Republicans fundraiser in Hollywood on June 29, 2006

On June 29, 2006 Schwarzenegger attended a fundraiser for Log Cabin Republicans, where he said, "I can't promise you that we will always be [of] the same mind, but I can promise you that I will always have an open mind."

=== Same-sex marriage ===
On February 20, 2004 Schwarzenegger ordered California Attorney General Bill Lockyer to intervene immediately to stop San Francisco from granting marriage licenses to same-sex couples. On the March 3 episode of The Tonight Show with Jay Leno, Schwarzenegger said it would be "fine with [him]" if Californians changed the state's family code to allow for same-sex marriages. He also said he opposed a proposed constitutional amendment supported by George W. Bush that would nationally ban them.

On September 29, 2005 Schwarzenegger vetoed 52 bills, among them legislation to legalize same-sex marriage. On October 12, 2007, for a second time, Schwarzenegger vetoed a bill to legalize same-sex marriage. Schwarzenegger said, "I support current domestic partnership rights and will continue to vigorously defend and enforce these rights."

On May 15, 2008 the state Supreme Court, striking down a 1977 law and Proposition 22 in a 4–3 decision, ruled that same-sex couples had a constitutional right to marry. In a statement, Schwarzenegger said that he respected the ruling and did not support a constitutional amendment to overturn it. On April 11, 2008 Schwarzenegger told a group of gay Republicans that an attempt to ban same-sex marriage by changing the state constitution is a "total waste of time" and promised to oppose such an initiative if it qualified for the state ballot. Schwarzenegger, therefore, did not support 2008 California Proposition 8, which was passed by voters nevertheless, again banning same-sex marriages in the state.

Proposition 8 was later struck down by court decisions, and Schwarzenegger did not appeal. At the end of his governorship, Civil rights attorney Shannon Minter of the National Center for Lesbian Rights gave Schwarzenegger a B− grade on gay and lesbian issues, calling Schwarzenegger's decision not to appeal Perry v. Schwarzenegger, which struck down Proposition 8, "a really quite dramatic stand for a Republican governor to have taken."

== Disaster management ==
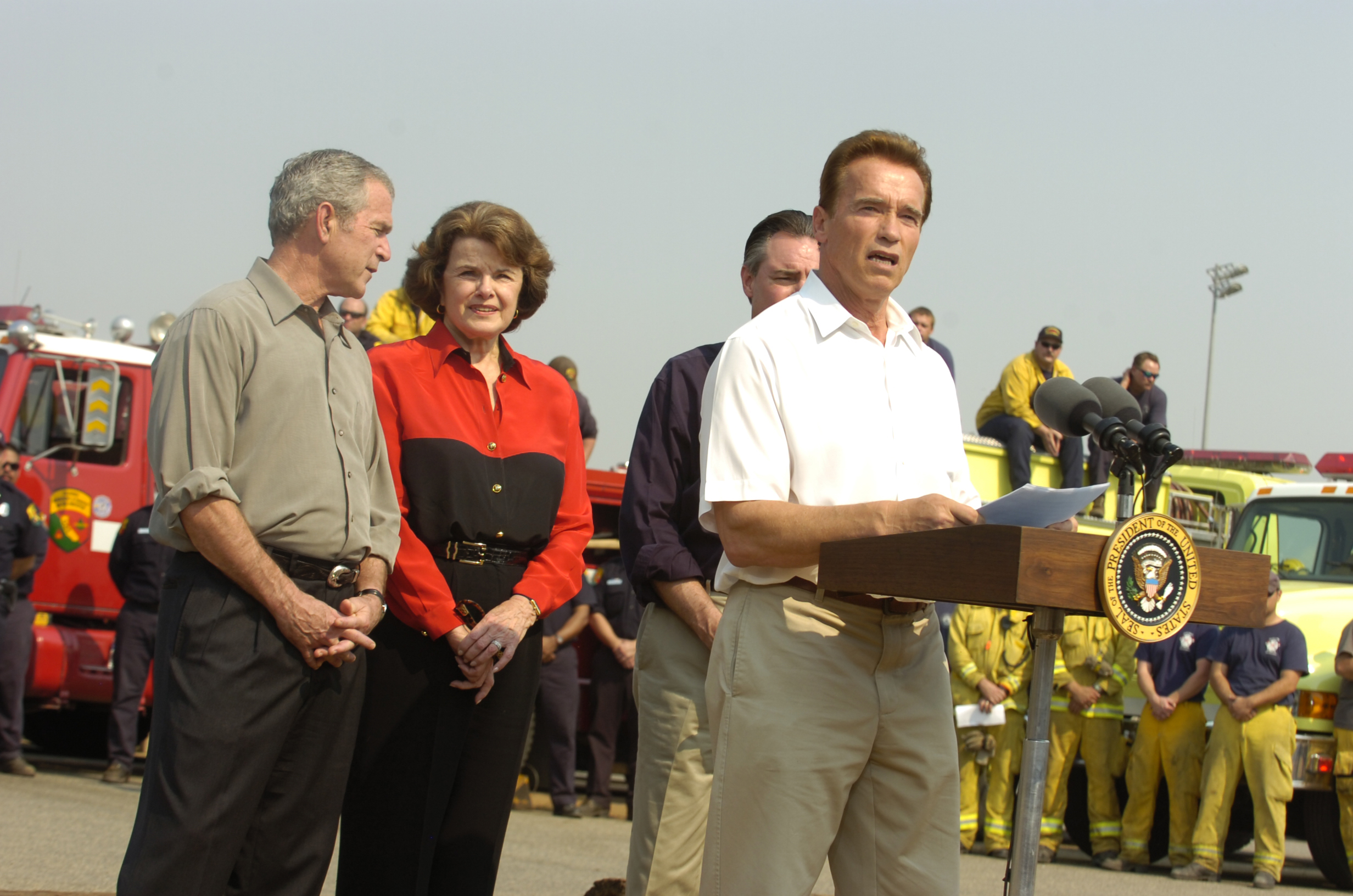
Schwarzenegger addressing ongoing wildfires with President George W. Bush and U.S. Senator Dianne Feinstein in Escondido on October 25, 2007

After a 6.5 magnitude earthquake on December 21, 2003, Schwarzenegger visited Paso Robles on December 23 and declared a state of emergency in San Luis Obispo County.

On January 12, 2005 Schwarzenegger went to La Conchita, California, after a deadly landslide on January 10, and told residents, "In the past few days, we have seen the power of nature cause damage and despair, but we will match that power with our own resolve."

Schwarzenegger declared a state of emergency in ten counties on January 16, 2007 after freezing weather damaged California farmers' crops, causing up to $1 billion in damages.

On April 30, 2007, Schwarzenegger declared a state of emergency after a highway collapse in Oakland, authorizing free transit on the Bay Area Rapid Transit rail system, ferries, and buses for one day.

With more than a dozen wildfires raging across southern California, on October 22, 2007 Schwarzenegger declared a state of emergency in seven counties and reassigned 800 soldiers in the National Guard from patrolling the border to help battle the wildfires as well as calling the situation "a tragic time for California". On October 23, Schwarzenegger said that he was "happy" with the number of firefighters working the blazes, but officials said that they were stretched thin and that a lack of resources was as much a burden as the temperatures and winds. In spite of their differences on policy, Schwarzenegger and George W. Bush travelled to southern California on October 25 to view the scarred landscape by helicopter and Bush telling Californians that they wouldn't be forgotten in Washington, D.C. During a news conference on October 27, Schwarzenegger said that at least two fires were started intentionally and two more had suspicious origins and issued a warning for arsonists, "We will hunt down the people that are responsible for that. If I were one of the people who started the fires, I would not sleep soundly right now, because we're right behind you."

On November 7, 2007, container ship Cosco Busan struck a tower of the San Francisco–Oakland Bay Bridge, causing an oil spill. This led to Schwarzenegger declaring a state of emergency on November 9, saying, "There is tremendous damage on the wildlife and on the beaches. If mistakes were made, then we will bring them out." On November 13, Schwarzenegger issued an order suspending all fishing and crabbing for human consumption in areas affected by the spill until at least December 1. The ban on fishing and crabbing in the San Francisco area was lifted by Schwarzenegger on November 29 after studies showed no ill effects from the oil spill, but state officials urged seafood lovers to stay away from some mussels and oysters.

After the Pacific Fishery Management Council voted on April 10, 2008 to cancel the chinook fishing season in an effort to reverse the catastrophic disappearance of California's run of the king salmon, Schwarzenegger declared a state of emergency and sent a letter to George W. Bush asking for his help in obtaining federal disaster assistance.

On May 27, 2008, Schwarzenegger and Nevada governor Jim Gibbons declared a state of emergency in the Lake Tahoe basin after taking the advice of a two-state commission that declared the region ripe for catastrophic fire. On June 4, 2008 Schwarzenegger issued a drought declaration—the first of its kind since 1991—ordering the transfer of water from less dry areas to those that are dangerously dry. The governor also said he would ask the federal government for aid to farmers and press water districts, cities, and local water agencies to accelerate conservation. On June 12, 2008, Schwarzenegger declared a state of emergency in nine counties over the drought, ordering several state agencies to help drill wells, use the California Aqueduct to transport water to farmers, and to expedite water transfers between agencies. On September 29, 2008, Schwarzenegger signed several bills that aimed to speed response and improve cleanup efforts after a major oil spill. Schwarzenegger declared a state of emergency on February 27, 2009 because of three years of below-average rain and snowfall in California, a step that urges urban water agencies to reduce water use by 20 percent.

== Criminal justice ==
On August 16, 2004, Schwarzenegger stated that he was considering giving weightlifting equipment back to prisoners, who had been barred from using weights since 1997.

At a rally in Los Angeles on October 28, 2004 Schwarzenegger joined three former California governors, including his predecessor Gray Davis, to voice his opposition to Proposition 66, which would augment the state's three-strikes law.

Schwarzenegger allowed the execution of Donald Beardslee to proceed on January 19, 2005, marking the first California state execution during his tenure as governor and the first to occur in three years.

On June 26, 2006, reversing a decade of California policy, Schwarzenegger called for the construction of at least two more prisons and the addition of thousands of beds in existing facilities in order to deal with what he called "dangerously overcrowded" prisons. Schwarzenegger proclaimed a state of emergency regarding prison crowding on October 4, 2006 and said, "Our prisons are now beyond maximum capacity, and we must act immediately and aggressively to resolve this issue."

On January 19, 2006, Santa Barbara judge Frank Ochoa overturned Schwarzenegger's decision to deny parole to inmate Frank Pintye, who was present when his friend beat a 69-year-old man with a tire iron and then set the man ablaze.

The California State Legislature approved the largest single prison construction program in U.S. history and agreed to send 8,000 convicts to other states on April 26, 2007. On May 3, 2007, Schwarzenegger signed the bill, which authorized a 53,000 bed expansion of inmate capacity in state prisons and county jails at a cost of between $7.8 to $8.3 billion.

Execution by year
2003	0
2004	0
2005	2
2006	1
2007	0
2008	0
2009	0
2010	0
2011	0

=== Execution of Stanley Williams ===
On November 25, 2005 Schwarzenegger said he would consider granting clemency to convicted killer and Crips co-founder Stanley Williams. In a closed-door meeting, Schwarzenegger met with lawyers of Stanley Williams and prosecutors with each side having thirty minutes to plead its case to the governor. Margita Thompson told reporters that Schwarzenegger's decision on whether to grant clemency to Williams would come as late as December 12. Schwarzenegger denied Williams clemency on December 12, writing, "Stanley Williams insists he is innocent, and that he will not and should not apologize or otherwise atone for the murders of the four victims in this case. Without an apology and atonement for these senseless and brutal killings, there can be no redemption." After the U.S. Supreme Court refused to stay the execution, Williams was executed shortly after midnight at San Quentin State Prison on December 13.

In his birth nation of Austria, Schwarzenegger faced backlash over the execution on December 19 from left-wing councillors in Graz, who announced that they were seeking to strip him of his Austrian citizenship. Schwarzenegger sent a letter to Graz on December 19 demanding his name to be removed from a stadium that bore his name since 1997. He also wrote that he was revoking his permission for Graz to use his name in any advertising campaigns that promote the city. On December 26, Schwarzenegger's name was removed from the stadium.

== Healthcare and public health ==
Schwarzenegger signed a bill on September 28 that banned mercury in vaccines for young children and pregnant women, making California the second U.S. state after Iowa to do so. On September 30, Schwarzenegger vetoed two bills—one that would have required the California Department of Health Services to set up a website to help consumers compare prices among Canadian pharmacies and buy medicines from them and another bill that would have required California to monitor foreign suppliers of prescription drugs to make sure they met American standards for purity, handling and packaging.

On December 7, 2004 Schwarzenegger was giving a speech in Long Beach at an annual conference celebrating women's contributions to the state when he was interrupted by protesting nurses who he criticized as "special interests"

On March 6, 2005, Schwarzenegger declared his desire to ban all sales of junk food in California schools and instead fill school vending machines with fresh fruits, vegetables and milk. On September 15, Schwarzenegger signed bills that banned the sale of sodas in high schools and set fat, sugar, and calorie standards for all food, except cafeteria lunches, sold in public schools.

On September 29, 2005 Schwarzenegger vetoed 52 bills, among them legislation that would give residents access to cheaper prescriptions from Canada and create greater oversight of the state's $3 billion stem cell research program.

After George W. Bush vetoed expanded federal funding of embryonic stem cell research on July 19, 2006, Schwarzenegger authorized a $150 million loan to fund California's stem cell institute on July 20.

On January 8, 2007, Schwarzenegger proposed a system of universal health insurance for Californians.

On July 12, 2007, Schwarzenegger met with Bay Area executives, asking them to support his health care reform plan, while deriding a Democratic alternative and single-payer healthcare.

On October 14, 2007, Schwarzenegger signed bills that banned phthalates in children's products.

On December 11, 2007, Schwarzenegger allowed some financially struggling hospitals to keep operating until 2020 even though the state said they were most likely to crumple during a major seismic event.

Schwarzenegger signed a bill on July 25, 2008 that made California the first U.S. state to ban trans fats in restaurant food.

== Education ==
In April 2005, Schwarzenegger appointed Alan Bersin to serve as the state secretary of education. In March 2007, Schwarzenegger appointed David Long to serve as state secretary of education.

While giving a commencement speech at Santa Monica College on June 14, 2005, Schwarzenegger faced boos, jeers, turned backs, and signs of protest to his policies on education funding.

In his 2008 State of the State address, Schwarzenegger stated that his education priority would be to transform 98 school districts that had posted rock-bottom test scores for at least five years. On February 27, 2008, Schwarzenegger and state schools chief Jack O'Connell announced a joint plan to help 96 troubled school districts improve academically.

== Immigration ==
California sits along the United States-Mexico border, making immigration matters particularly relevant in the state.

Schwarzenegger vetoed a bill on September 22, 2004 that would have given as many as two million illegal immigrants California drivers licenses, claiming that the measure failed to provide sufficient security provisions at a time of heightened terrorism concerns.

In a radio interview on April 28, 2005, Schwarzenegger praised the Minutemen campaign that used armed volunteers to stop illegal immigrants from crossing into the U.S., which drew condemnation from Democrats, immigrants' rights groups, the Mexican government, and some Republicans.

Schwarzenegger caused controversy on October 4, 2006 when he said that Mexican immigrants "try to stay Mexican" rather than assimilate in the United States.

On April 23, 2006, Schwarzenegger said that the proposed building a 700-mile wall along the border with Mexico to deter illegal immigration would amount to "going back to the Stone Ages" and urged the federal government to instead use high-tech gear and more patrols to secure the nation's southern boundary. In leaked audio tapes, Schwarzenegger likened the proposed Mexico–United States border fence to the Berlin Wall in March, "We had the Berlin Wall; we had walls everywhere. But we always looked at the wall as kind of like the outside of the wall is the enemy. Are we looking at Mexico as the enemy? No, it's not. These are our trading partners."

On June 23, 2006, Schwarzenegger rejected a request from President George W. Bush to more than double the number of California National Guard troops that would be deployed to the border, fearing the commitment could leave the state vulnerable if an earthquake or wildfire erupted.

On November 9, 2006, Schwarzenneger met with Mexican President Vicente Fox, and discussed immigration among other matters.

== Firearms ==
On September 13, 2004, Schwarzenegger signed the .50 Caliber BMG Regulation Act, which banned the manufacturing, sale, distribution, and importation of .50 BMG rifles, making California the first U.S. state to do so. On October 14, 2007, Schwarzenegger signed legislation that made California the first U.S. state to require semiautomatic pistols sold in the state to leave a unique imprint on bullets that are fired.

== State election reform ==
In his State of the State address on January 5, 2005, Schwarzenegger proposed turning over the drawing of the state's political map to a panel of retired judges. This was ultimately rejected by voters in the November 8, 2005 special election that Schwarzenegger called when Californians voted against Proposition 77.

After the passage of 2008 Proposition 11, Schwarzenegger declared victory on the issue of independent redistricting, saying, "This is why this is historic—the first time where really citizens independently of the Legislature...will draw the district lines in the future."

On January 15, 2008, Schwarzenegger endorsed 2008 Proposition 93 in a flip-flop on term limits.

== Marijuana ==
GQ reported on October 29, 2007 that Schwarzenegger had told Piers Morgan in an interview that "[marijuana] is not a drug, it's a leaf." Schwarzenegger said on May 6, 2009 that he believed it was time to debate legalizing marijuana for recreational use in California.

== Foreign relations ==
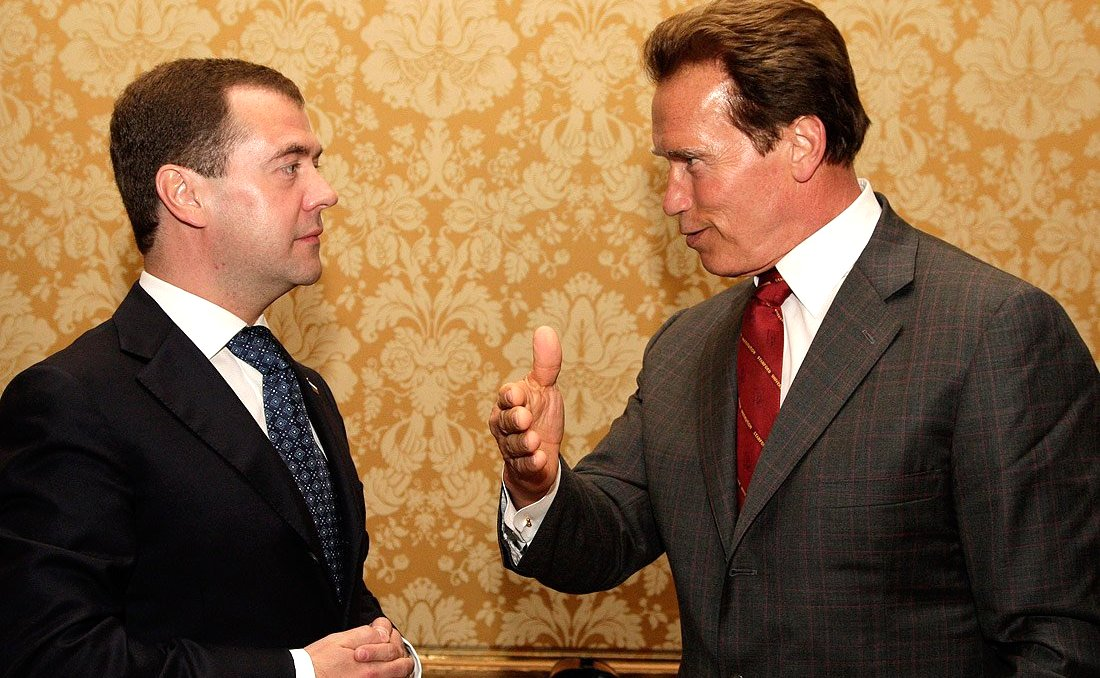
Schwarzenegger meeting with Russian President Dmitry Medvedev in San Francisco on June 23, 2010

In 2004, Schwazenegger made an official trip abroad, visiting Israel on May 2, 2004 where he met Prime Minister Ariel Sharon and attended the groundbreaking ceremony for the city's Simon Wiesenthal Centre Museum of Tolerance. On May 3, Schwarzenegger met King Abdullah II of Jordan in a hastily arranged visit following criticism from Arab Americans that his trip to the Middle East had excluded a meeting with Arabs. On November 10, 2004, Schwarzenegger traveled to Japan and met Prime Minister Junichiro Koizumi on November 12, who remarked that the governor was more popular in Japan than U.S. president George W. Bush.

In November 2005, Schawzenegger traveled to China, speaking at an energy conference in Beijing on November 16 to encourage energy partnerships and decreased reliance on oil. On November 19, Schwarzenegger wrapped up his trip to China in Hong Kong, where he unveiled an anti-piracy ad he had filmed with Jackie Chan.

In July 2006, Schwarzenegger reached an agreement with the United Kingdom relating to partnerships on carbon emissions as well as green energy and related research.

Schwarzenegger met with Mexican President Vicente Fox on November 9, 2006 to discuss immigration and trade issues and to encourage further efforts on both sides to control greenhouse gases.

On June 26, 2007, Schwarzenegger visited London, where he met Tony Blair on Blair's final full day in office as Prime Minister and issued a plea for countries to join the fight against global warming.

Via satellite, Schwarzenegger addressed the British Conservative Party on September 30, 2007, during which he called opposition leader David Cameron "a new, dynamic leader".

On October 30, 2007, Schwarzenegger met with Uruguayan President Tabaré Vázquez.

Schwarzenegger was in Baghdad on March 17, 2010, when he praised U.S. soldiers for helping Iraqi Prime Minister Nouri al-Maliki build and nurture Iraq's public institutions.

== Other matters ==
On December 16, 2010 Schwarzenegger appeared on CNN’s Larry King Live during the program’s final broadcast; introduced by co-hosts Bill Maher and Ryan Seacrest, he announced a gubernatorial proclamation declaring the date “Larry King Day” in California and thanked King for broadcasting the show from Los Angeles, California.

Schwarzenegger declared April 24, 2005 a "Day of Remembrance of the Armenian genocide" to the chagrin of the Ankara Chamber of Commerce, an umbrella organization grouping some 300 Ankara-based unions and businesses.

On September 29, 2005 Schwarzenegger vetoed 52 bills, including legislation to raise the minimum wage. Schwarzenegger signed a bill on September 30 that tripled damages celebrities could win from paparazzi if they were assaulted during a shoot and denied the photographers profits from any pictures taken in an altercation. On October 7, Schwarzenegger signed legislation to outlaw the sale to teenagers of electronic games featuring reckless mayhem and explicit sexuality.

On May 2, 2006, Schwarzenegger told NFL commissioner Paul Tagliabue and a committee of eleven owners that he wanted two teams to play in Los Angeles.

After obtaining a six-minute recording, the Los Angeles Times published an article on September 8, 2006, writing that Schwarzenegger had casually said that "black blood" mixed with "Latino blood" equals "hot" when discussing Assemblywoman Bonnie Garcia's ethnicity with his chief of staff Susan Kennedy. Even though Garcia said she was not offended, Schwarzenegger apologized for the comment.

Schwarzenegger claimed on November 8, 2007 that he assumed an unspecified behind-the-scenes role in talks to bring an end to the screenwriters strike. In a news conference in Sacramento, Schwarzenegger said, "I'm talking to the parties that are involved because I think it's very important that we settle that as quickly as possible, because it has a tremendous economic impact on our state."

In Fresno, California, on June 6, 2008, Schwarzenegger met Honduran President Manuel Zelaya, who discussed job offers for Honduran workers. On June 12, 2008, Schwarzenegger and Chilean President Michelle Bachelet presided over the signing of a number of bilateral scientific, agricultural, and educational agreements.

=== Allegations of past groping ===
On December 9, 2003, Schwarzenegger declared that there was no investigation needed into the groping allegations that had been made against him. On the same day, stuntwoman Rhonda Miller sued Schwarzenegger for libel after his campaign emailed reporters a link to a criminal court website and search Rhonda Miller. The website indicated a Rhonda Miller had a criminal record for offenses which included prostitution, forgery, and drug dealing, but the stuntwoman's legal team said that the Rhonda Miller with the record was a different person. On August 25, 2006, Schwarzenegger settled a libel lawsuit with Anna Richardson, who claimed she was groped by him during a 2000 interview and later defamed by his aides during his 2003 campaign.

== Assessments ==
In an article of Time on November 1, 2010, Thad Kousser of the University of California, San Diego said, "[Schwarzenegger] is not divisive nor scandal plagued, but he's generally fallen short of changing the political culture of Sacramento and the policy course of the state." Nick Roman of KPCC wrote that, "Schwarzenegger's legacy is varied and puzzling, inspiring, and infuriating—just like the state he governed."

== Electoral history ==
Key:	Withdrew prior to contest

California gubernatorial recall election, 2003
Vote on recall			Votes	Percentage
Yes			4,976,274	55.4%
No			4,007,783	44.6%
Invalid or blank votes			429,431	4.6%
Totals			9,413,488	100.0%
Voter turnout			61.2%	
Rank	Party	Candidate	Votes	Percentage
1	Republican	Arnold Schwarzenegger	4,206,284	48.6%
2	Democratic	Cruz Bustamante	2,724,874	31.5%
3	Republican	Tom McClintock	1,161,287	13.4%
4	Green	Peter Camejo	242,247	2.8%
5	Independent	Arianna Huffington	47,505	0.5%
	All other listed and write-in candidates		275,719	3.2%
Totals			9,413,491	100.0%
Voter turnout			61.2%	
	Republican gain from Democratic			

Note that San Bernardino County did not report write-in votes for individual candidates.

2006 California gubernatorial Republican primary election
Party	Candidate	Votes	%
Republican	Arnold Schwarzenegger (incumbent)	1,724,296	90.0
Republican	Robert C. Newman II	68,663	3.6
Republican	Bill Chambers	65,488	3.4
Republican	Jeffrey R. Burns	57,652	3.0
Total votes		1,916,099	100.0

2006 California gubernatorial general election
Party	Candidate	Votes	%
Republican	Arnold Schwarzenegger (incumbent)	4,850,157	55.9
Democratic	Phil Angelides	3,376,732	39.0
Green	Peter Camejo	205,995	2.3
Libertarian	Art Olivier	114,329	1.3
Peace and Freedom	Janice Jordan	69,934	0.8
American Independent	Edward Noonan	61,901	0.7
	Write-in	368	0.0
Total votes		8,679,416	100.0
Republican hold			

== See also ==
- Opinion polling on the Arnold Schwarzenegger governorship
