= The Simpsons Movie =

2007 film by David Silverman

- Theatrical release poster
- Directed by: David Silverman
- Screenplay by: James L. Brooks; Matt Groening; Al Jean; Ian Maxtone-Graham; George Meyer; David Mirkin; Mike Reiss; Mike Scully; Matt Selman; John Swartzwelder; Jon Vitti
- Based on: The Simpsons by Matt Groening
- Produced by: James L. Brooks; Matt Groening; Al Jean; Mike Scully; Richard Sakai
- Starring: Dan Castellaneta; Julie Kavner; Nancy Cartwright; Yeardley Smith; Hank Azaria; Harry Shearer; Pamela Hayden; Tress MacNeille; Albert Brooks
- Edited by: John Carnochan
- Music by: Hans Zimmer (Note: The Simpsons Theme by Danny Elfman)
- Production companies: 20th Century Fox; Gracie Films
- Distributed by: 20th Century Fox
- Release dates: July 21, 2007 (Springfield); July 27, 2007 (United States)
- Running time: 87 minutes
- Country: United States
- Language: English
- Budget: $75 million
- Box office: $536.4 million

The Simpsons Movie is a 2007 American animated comedy film directed by David Silverman and based on the animated television series The Simpsons created by Matt Groening. The film stars Dan Castellaneta, Julie Kavner, Nancy Cartwright, Yeardley Smith, Hank Azaria, Harry Shearer, Pamela Hayden, Tress MacNeille, and other recurring actors reprising their roles from the series, with Albert Brooks joining for the film. The plot follows the Simpson family as they grapple with the fallout of patriarch Homer Simpson's reckless actions, which leads to their town Springfield being encased under a massive glass dome by the Environmental Protection Agency (EPA), the family becoming runaway fugitives, and a strain on their relationship with him.

Although previous attempts to create a Simpsons film had been made, they failed due to the lack of a final screenplay. In 2001, after the voice cast agreed to do the film, series producers Groening, James L. Brooks, Al Jean, Mike Scully and Richard Sakai began development on the film: a writing team of Brooks, Groening, Jean, Scully, Ian Maxtone-Graham, George Meyer, David Mirkin, Mike Reiss, Matt Selman, John Swartzwelder, and Jon Vitti was assembled. They conceived numerous plot ideas, with one of Groening's ultimately being adapted. The screenplay was rewritten over a hundred times, which continued after work on the film's animation began in 2006. Consequently, hours of finished material was cut from the final release, including cameo roles from Erin Brockovich, Minnie Driver, Isla Fisher, Edward Norton, and Kelsey Grammer, who would have reprised his role as Sideshow Bob. Green Day and Tom Hanks voice their own animated counterparts in the film's final cut. Hans Zimmer composed the score for the film, while Green Day performed a rock version of the series' theme.

The Simpsons Movie premiered in Springfield, Vermont on July 21, 2007, and was theatrically released in the United States on July 27, by 20th Century Fox. The film received positive reviews from critics, who praised its story, writing, humor, and animation, and was a commercial success, grossing $536.4 million worldwide against a production budget of $75 million, becoming the eighth-highest-grossing film of 2007, as well as at the time the second-highest-grossing traditionally animated film and the highest-grossing film based on an animated television series, two records later overtaken by Demon Slayer: Kimetsu no Yaiba – The Movie: Infinity Castle in 2025. The film was nominated for numerous awards, including a Golden Globe Award for Best Animated Feature Film at the 65th Golden Globe Awards. A sequel, titled The New Simpsons Movie, is scheduled for release on September 3, 2027.

== Plot ==
After finishing a concert at Lake Springfield, Green Day tries to engage the audience in a discussion about the environment, but they refuse to listen and throw garbage at the band. The pollution in the lake erodes the band's barge, causing them to drown. Concerned about the terrible state of the environment, Lisa and her new boyfriend Colin hold a seminar and convince the town to clean up the lake. Meanwhile, Grampa has a spiritual experience and prophesies that a disaster will befall Springfield (which involves a "twisted tail", "a thousand eyes", the people being "trapped forever", and ending it with an ominous warning of "eepah"), which only Marge takes seriously. Homer adopts a pig he names "Plopper" to save him from being slaughtered by Krusty the Clown at Krusty Burger. When Homer brings the pig back home, Marge identifies the pig as a part of the prophecy and warns Homer to get rid of him, but Homer refuses. Homer's fawning over Plopper makes Bart, now fed up with Homer's carelessness, look to Ned Flanders as a father figure.

Marge orders Homer to dispose of an overflowing silo full of Plopper's feces (and some of Homer's own, as well). Rather than disposing of it safely, he becomes distracted after hearing that Lard Lad is giving away free donuts and hastily dumps the silo in the lake, critically polluting it. After a squirrel falls into the lake and becomes mutated (bearing the "thousand eyes" Grandpa mentioned in the process), Russ Cargill, head of the Environmental Protection Agency (EPA), informs President Arnold Schwarzenegger of Springfield's pollution crisis and presents him with five solutions. Schwarzenegger randomly picks the third option – sealing Springfield off from the rest of the world under a giant glass dome, trapping everyone and completing the prophecy.

Being trapped under the dome causes mass hysteria in Springfield and when Homer's silo is discovered on the news, hundreds of townspeople arrive at the Simpsons' house in an attempt to lynch the family. They escape through a sinkhole, which destroys the house. The family is furious at Homer for his blundering, but he convinces them to follow him to Alaska, where he had always planned to go if something like the incident happened. Homer wins a truck by riding a motorcycle around a globe of death and the family restarts their lives in a remote Alaskan cabin.

As Springfield begins exhausting its supplies, the townspeople eventually attack the dome and the city descends into chaos. Cargill, mad with the power he has over Springfield and outraged by their defiance, tricks Schwarzenegger into ordering the town's demolition. The Simpsons see Tom Hanks on television advertising a "new Grand Canyon" on the site of Springfield. Realizing that their hometown is in danger, the family vow to save it except Homer, who refuses to assist and storms out. When he returns the next morning, he finds his family has left to save Springfield, with Marge taping a message over their wedding video to explain this to him. However, Marge and the kids are captured by the EPA in Seattle and placed back inside the dome. Meanwhile, a distraught Homer is recovered by an Inuk shaman, who helps him come to an epiphany about his selfishness; he decides to save the town and his family.

The EPA lowers a time bomb suspended by a rope through a hole at the top of the dome. While the townspeople attempt climbing the rope to escape, Homer returns to Springfield and descends the rope, knocking the escaping townspeople and the bomb off, inadvertently shortening its countdown and further provoking the town's ire. Refusing to give up, Homer reconciles with Bart and they use a motorcycle to travel up the side of the dome with the bomb. Bart throws the bomb through the hole seconds before it detonates, shattering the dome and freeing the town. Cargill attempts to murder Homer for foiling his plan, but Maggie knocks him out by dropping a rock on his head. The dome's destruction prompts the townspeople to forgive and praise Homer as a hero. The citizens begin restoring the town and the Simpsons' house.

== Voice cast ==
Voice actor	Credited role(s)
Dan Castellaneta	Homer Simpson, Grampa Simpson, Krusty the Clown, Groundskeeper Willie, Mayor Quimby, Sideshow Mel, Mr. Teeny, EPA Official, Itchy, and Barney Gumble
Julie Kavner	Marge Simpson, Patty and Selma Bouvier (scenes deleted)
Nancy Cartwright	Bart Simpson, Ralph Wiggum, Todd Flanders, and Nelson Muntz
Yeardley Smith	Lisa Simpson
Hank Azaria	Moe Szyslak, Chief Wiggum, Cletus Spuckler, Professor Frink, Apu Nahasapeemapetilon, Lou, Comic Book Guy, Captain McCallister, Bumblebee Man, and Dr. Nick
Harry Shearer	Mr. Burns, Smithers, Ned Flanders, Reverend Lovejoy, Lenny, President Arnold Schwarzenegger, Seymour Skinner, Kent Brockman, Dr. Hibbert, Scratchy, and Otto Mann
Pamela Hayden	Milhouse Van Houten, Rod Flanders, and Jimbo Jones
Tress MacNeille	Medicine Woman, Agnes Skinner, Crazy Cat Lady, Colin, and Cookie Kwan
Albert Brooks (credited as "A. Brooks")	Russ Cargill
Karl Wiedergott	EPA Officer and Man
Marcia Wallace	Edna Krabappel (scenes deleted)
Russi Taylor	Martin Prince
Maggie Roswell	Helen Lovejoy
Phil Rosenthal	TV Dad
Billie Joe Armstrong	Green Day (themselves)
Frank Edwin Wright III	Green Day (themselves)
Michael Pritchard	Green Day (themselves)
Joe Mantegna	Fat Tony
Tom Hanks	Himself

== Production ==
=== Development ===
The production staff had considered a film adaptation of The Simpsons (1989–present) since early in the series. The show's creator, Matt Groening, felt a feature film would allow them to increase the show's scale and animate sequences too complex for the TV series. He intended the film to be made after the show ended, "but that [...] was undone by good ratings". There were attempts to adapt the fourth season episode "Kamp Krusty" into a film, but difficulties were encountered in expanding the episode to feature-length. For a long time, the project was held up. There was difficulty finding a story that was sufficient for a film, and the crew did not have enough time to complete such a project, as they already worked full-time on the show. Groening also expressed a wish to make Simpstasia, a parody of Fantasia (1940); it was never produced, partly because it would have been too difficult to write a feature-length screenplay. At another point, it was briefly suggested to do an anthology-style Treehouse of Horror film, but such suggestion was never pursued. Recurring guest performer Phil Hartman had wished to make a live-action film based on his character Troy McClure; several of the show's staff expressed a desire to help create it, and Josh Weinstein proposed to use the plot of the seventh season episode "A Fish Called Selma" for the film, but the project was canceled following Hartman's death in 1998. The project was officially green-lit by 20th Century Fox in 1997, and Groening and James L. Brooks were set to produce the film.

"If every episode of The Simpsons is a celebration, which we try to make it, then the movie is like a big celebration. It's a way of honoring the animators, allowing them to really strut their stuff and really go as far as they can with the art of the handwritten gesture. It's a way of honoring the writers, because we were able to get the best all-star writers of The Simpsons and write our hearts out, and it's a way of honoring all the great actors."
— Matt Groening

The voice cast was signed on to do the film in 2001, and work then began on the screenplay. The producers were initially worried that creating a film would have a negative effect on the series, as they did not have enough crew to focus their attention on both projects. As the series progressed, additional writers and animators were hired so that both the show and the film could be produced at the same time. Groening and Brooks invited Mike Scully and Al Jean (who continued to work as showrunner on the television series) to produce the film with them. They then signed series director David Silverman to direct the film. The "strongest possible" writing team was assembled, with many of the writers from the show's early seasons being chosen. David Mirkin, Mike Reiss, George Meyer, John Swartzwelder, and Jon Vitti were selected. Ian Maxtone-Graham and Matt Selman would also join later, with Brooks, Groening, Scully, and Jean also writing parts of the screenplay. Sam Simon did not return having left the show over creative differences in 1993. Former writer Conan O'Brien expressed interest in working with the Simpsons staff again, although he later joked that "I worry that the Simpsons-writing portion of my brain has been destroyed after 14 years of talking to Lindsay Lohan and that guy from One Tree Hill, so maybe it's all for the best." The same went for director Brad Bird who said he had "entertained fantasies of asking if [he] could work on the movie", but did not have enough time due to work on films like The Incredibles (2004) and Ratatouille (2007). The producers arranged a deal with Fox that would allow them to abandon production of the film at any point if they felt the screenplay was unsatisfactory.

Work continued on the screenplay from late 2003 onwards, taking place in the small bungalow where Groening first pitched The Simpsons in 1987. The writers spent six months discussing a plot, and each of them offered sketchy ideas. On their first brainstorming session, Scully suggested a story in which Steven Spielberg (intended to be voiced by Spielberg himself) would try to blow up Springfield so he could shoot a film with Tom Hanks (who ultimately made a guest appearance voicing himself in the finished film). It was also on this same reunion that Groening introduced the idea of Homer adopting a pet pig, inspired by a pig-waste management story he had read in the news. Jean suggested the family rescue manatees, which became the seventeenth season episode "The Bonfire of the Manatees", and there was also a notion similar to that of The Truman Show (1998) where the characters discovered their lives were a TV show. Groening rejected this, as he felt that the Simpsons should "never become aware of themselves as celebrities", but the idea was later used in the video game The Simpsons Game (2007). Groening read about a town that had to get rid of pig feces in their water supply, which inspired the plot of the film. The decision for Flanders to have an important role also came early on, as Jean wished to see Bart wonder what his life would be like if Flanders were his father. Hank Scorpio, a character from the eight season episode "You Only Move Twice", was originally meant to return as the main antagonist, but the staff dropped the idea and created Russ Cargill instead.

Having eventually decided on the basic outline of the plot for the film, the writers then separated it into seven sections. Jean, Scully, Reiss, Swartzwelder, Vitti, Mirkin, and Meyer wrote 25 pages each, and the group met one month later to merge the seven sections into one "very rough draft". The film's screenplay was written in the same way as the television series: the writers sitting around a table, pitching ideas, and trying to make each other laugh. The screenplay was rewritten over 100 times, and at one point, the film was a musical. However, the songs were continually being shortened and the idea was dropped. Groening described his desire to also make the film dramatically stronger than a TV episode, saying that he wanted to "give you something that you haven't seen before".

=== Animation ===
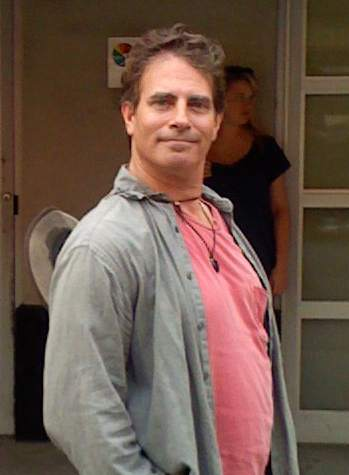
Director David Silverman looked at some of the television episodes he had directed for inspiration.

Animation for the film began in January 2006, with the Itchy & Scratchy short being the first scene to be storyboarded. Groening rejected making either a live-action or a CGI film, calling the film's animation "deliberately imperfect" and "a tribute to the art of hand-drawn animation". The film was produced in a widescreen 2.40:1 aspect ratio, to distinguish it from the then 4:3 fullscreen look of the television series at the time, and colored with the largest palette the animators ever had available to them. A lot of the animation was produced using Wacom Cintiq tablets, which allowed images to be drawn directly onto a computer monitor to facilitate production. Animation production work was divided among four studios around the world: with animation production done at Film Roman in Burbank, California and Rough Draft Studios in Glendale, California and overseas animation done at AKOM and Rough Draft's division, in Seoul, South Korea, all of whom previously worked on the series. As with the television series, the storyboarding, character designs, background layout, general animation, and animatic parts of production, were done in America. The overseas studios completed the camera work, inbetweening, and digital ink and paint before shipping the animation back to the United States. The film was animated using a combination of Toon Boom Harmony and Toon Boom Opus.

Director David Silverman said that unlike the TV series where "you [have] to pick and choose", the film gave them the opportunity to "lavish that attention [on] every single scene". The characters have shadows, unlike in the show. Silverman and the animators looked to films such as The Incredibles, The Triplets of Belleville (2003), and Bad Day at Black Rock (1955) for inspiration, as they were "a great education in staging because of how the characters are placed". They also looked for ideas for a dream sequence, in Disney films such as Dumbo (1941) and the Pluto cartoon Pluto's Judgment Day and for crowd scenes in It's a Mad, Mad, Mad, Mad World (1963). Silverman looked at some of the Simpsons episodes he had directed and other favorite episodes, including the sixth season episode "Homie the Clown" and the second season episode "Three Men and a Comic Book". Mike B. Anderson, Lauren MacMullan, Rich Moore and Steven Dean Moore each directed the animation for around a quarter of the film under Silverman's supervision, with numerous other animators working on scenes.

=== Casting ===
For inspiration for the crowd scenes in the film, the production staff referenced a poster featuring more than 320 Simpsons characters. Groening said they tried to include every single character in the film, with 98 having speaking parts, and most members of the crowds being previously established characters instead of generic people. The series' regular voice actors: Dan Castellaneta, Julie Kavner, Nancy Cartwright, Yeardley Smith, Hank Azaria and Harry Shearer, as well as semi-regular performers Tress MacNeille, Pamela Hayden, Marcia Wallace, Maggie Roswell, Russi Taylor and Karl Wiedergott, reprised their roles. Joe Mantegna returned as Fat Tony, while Albert Brooks, who supplied many guest voices in episodes, was cast as the main antagonist Russ Cargill after he told the staff that he wanted to be part of the film. For "about a week", Brooks was to reprise the role of Hank Scorpio, but when the character was omitted from the film, he ended up voicing Cargill himself.

The shot of an angry mob coming for Homer features cameos from more than 320 characters.

The cast did the first of three table readings in May 2005, and began recording every week from June 2006 until the end of production. James L. Brooks directed them for the first time since the television show's early seasons. Castellaneta found the recording sessions "more intense" than recording the television series and "more emotionally dramatic". Some scenes, such as Marge's video message to Homer, were recorded over one hundred times, leaving the voice cast exhausted.

The writers had written the opening concert scene without a specific band in mind. Green Day was cast in that role, having requested to guest star in the show. Tom Hanks also appears as himself in the film and accepted the offer after just one phone call. Everybody Loves Raymond (1996-2005) creator Philip Rosenthal provides the voice of the father in the "new Grand Canyon" commercial with Hanks. Due to time restraints, several guests who had recorded parts were cut from the film. Minnie Driver recorded the part of a patronizing grievance counselor in a scene that ended up being cut. Edward Norton recorded the part of the man who gets crushed as the dome is implemented, performing a Woody Allen impression. The staff felt the voice was too distracting, so Castellaneta re-recorded Norton's dialogue with a different voice. Isla Fisher and Erin Brockovich also recorded cameos, but their scenes were cut. Kelsey Grammer recorded lines for Sideshow Bob, who was to appear at several different points, but these scenes were also cut. Johnny Knoxville was also touted as a possible guest star.

Although he does not provide the voice, Arnold Schwarzenegger is president of the United States rather than the contemporary real-life incumbent George W. Bush, because according to Groening "in two years ... the film [would be] out of date". Brooks was nervous about the idea, noting that "[Schwarzenegger's] opinion polls were way down", and said that they "were [hoping] he'd make a political comeback". The animators began by drawing an accurate caricature of Schwarzenegger, but one of the staff instead suggested an altered version of recurring character Rainier Wolfcastle as president. This idea was developed, with the design of Wolfcastle, himself also a caricature of Schwarzenegger, being given more wrinkles under his eyes and a different hairstyle.

=== Editing ===
Every aspect of the film was constantly analyzed, with storylines, jokes and characters regularly being rewritten. Although most animated films do not make extensive changes to the film during active production due to budget restrictions, The Simpsons Movie crew continued to edit their film into 2007, with some edits taking place as late as May, two months before the film was released. James L. Brooks noted, "70 percent of the things in [one of the trailers]—based on where we were eight weeks ago—are no longer in the movie." Groening said that enough material for two more films was cut. Various new characters were created, and then cut because they did not contribute enough.

Originally, Marge was the character who had the prophetic vision in church. The writers, however, considered this to be too dark and it was changed to Grampa. The role of Lisa's love interest Colin was frequently revised. He was previously named Dexter and Adrien, and his appearance was completely altered. One idea was to have Milhouse act as Lisa's love interest, but the writers realized "the audience was not as familiar with [his] long-standing crush on [Lisa] as [they had] thought". A car chase in which Homer throws flaming mummies out of a truck at the EPA was replaced with "more emotional and realistic" scenes at the motel and carnival that allowed for a change of pace. The scene of a naked Bart on his skateboard was Groening's idea, who had always wanted to have Bart skateboarding naked, and Mike Scully had the idea of showing Bart's penis for two seconds. Storyboard artist Martin Archer was credited for devising the way to cover Bart's genitals with different things before they are exposed to the viewer. While the crew agreed that the gag would be funny, they wondered if it would mean an R-rating for the film, as they were happy with a PG-13 rating and that the gag was nonsexual and silly. They were ultimately able to get away with the joke because it was not live-action nor was it Homer's genitals.

Further changes were made after the March 2007 preview screenings of the film in Portland, Oregon and Phoenix, Arizona. This included the deletion of Kang and Kodos heavily criticizing the film during the end credits. A lot of people at the screenings found the original film too coarse, and some of Homer's behavior too unlikable, so several scenes were toned down to make him more likable. Russ Cargill was redesigned several times, originally appearing as an older man whose speech patterns Albert Brooks based on Donald Rumsfeld. The older model was the one used by Burger King for the action figure.

Cargill's scene with Bart and Homer at the film's conclusion was added in to fully resolve his story, and the "Spider-Pig" gag was also a late addition. One excised scene, before the dome is put over Springfield, had Mr. Burns reminding viewers that it was the last point in the film that they could get a refund. Other deletions included Homer's encounter with a sausage truck driver, a scene with Plopper the pig at the end, and a news report showing the dome's effect on daily life in Springfield in areas such as farming and sports, all of which were featured on the DVD, were cut because they did not fit the overall context of the film. Several musical numbers, at various intervals throughout the film, were cut. These included a song about Alaska, featuring music by Dave Stewart of Eurythmics. Jean said it "got pretty far along in the animation, and then we got scared that the movie began to drag in that section."

=== Music ===
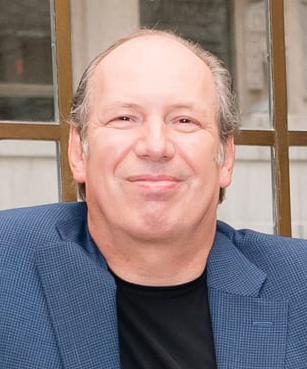
Hans Zimmer composed the film's score.

James L. Brooks chose Hans Zimmer to compose the film's score, as they were good friends and regular collaborators. Zimmer felt that the score was a "unique challenge", and he had to "try and express the style of The Simpsons without wearing the audience out". He used Danny Elfman's original opening theme, but did not wish to overuse it. He created themes for each member of the family. Homer's leitmotif was a major focus, and Zimmer also composed smaller themes for Bart and Marge. Regular television series composer Alf Clausen was not asked to score the film, noting: "sometimes you're the windshield, sometimes you're the bug".

In addition to their appearance in the film, Green Day recorded its own version of the Simpsons theme, and released it as a single. Zimmer turned the Spider-Pig song into a choral piece, which was a joke he never intended to be put into the film. Zimmer also had to write foreign-language lyrics for the 32 dubbed versions of the song when the film was released internationally. He found translating the song into Spanish the hardest to write. The same choir learned to sing the piece for each of the foreign-language dubs.

== Themes ==
An apple tree was inserted into the background here, in reference to Adam and Eve and the Garden of Eden.

Al Jean described the film's message as being "a man should listen to his wife". In addition, the film parodies two major contemporary issues, religion and environmentalism. The theme of environmentalism is present throughout the film: in Homer's polluting of Lake Springfield, Green Day's cameo, Lisa's activism and her romance with Colin. The villainous Russ Cargill is head of the Environmental Protection Agency. Reviewer Ed Gonzalez argued the plot was a satire of the government's reaction to the effects of Hurricane Katrina on New Orleans. Ian Nathan of Empire magazine criticized this focus, believing it gave the film an "overt political agenda [which] border[s] on polemic". James D. Bloom of Muhlenberg College commented on the "explicitness" of the film's "intellectual agenda", on this issue, shown particularly through Lisa. He wrote that the film's first post-opening credits scene, which sees Green Day fail in an attempt to engage their audience on the issue of the environment, "sets in motion a plot expressly built around cultural agenda-setting" and "reflection on timely 'issues'."

Religion is focused on in Grampa's momentary possession, and Marge believing what he said to be a message from God. Groening joked the film "posit[s] the existence of a very active God", when asked if he believed it was likely to offend. Mark I. Pinsky, author of The Gospel According to The Simpsons, said the film "treats genuine faith with respect, while keeping a sharp eye out for religious pretension and hypocrisy of all kinds". Regarding the scene where the tenants of Moe's Tavern and the Church switch locations, he believed it took the "chance to unmask everyone's human fallibility." In analyzing the role of Ned Flanders, he wrote, "It is [the] willingness of The Simpsons to depict all the different sides of us [...] that makes it so rich and funny on our complicated relationship with religion." Trees are a motif in the film, and they were implemented in every important or emotional scene throughout the film. The animators inserted an apple tree behind Lisa and Colin during their initial meeting, which was a reference to the biblical figures of Adam and Eve and the Garden of Eden.

== Release ==
=== Theatrical ===
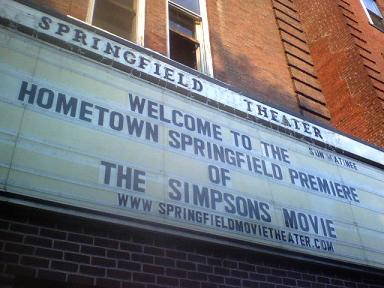
The marquee from the film's premiere, which took place in Springfield, Vermont

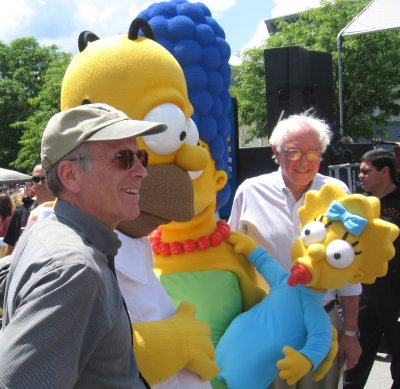
U.S. Senator Bernie Sanders (right) and U.S. Representative Peter Welch (left) at the premiere

On April 1, 2006, 20th Century Fox announced that the film would be released worldwide on July 27, 2007. The film was released a day earlier in Australia and the United Kingdom. Little information about the plot was released in the weeks building up to the film's release. Groening did not feel that "people look in the TV section of the newspaper and think, 'I'll watch this week's Simpsons because I like the plot.' You just tune in and see what happens."

Fox held a competition among 16 Springfields across the United States to host the American premiere. Each Springfield produced a film, explaining why their town should host the premiere, with the results being decided via a vote on the USA Today website. Springfield, Minnesota dropped out on May 31, 2007. The winner was announced on July 10 to be Springfield, Vermont. The town beat Springfield, Illinois by 15,367 votes to 14,634. Each of the other 14 entrants held their own smaller screenings of the film on July 26. Springfield, Vermont hosted the world premiere of the film on July 21 with a yellow carpet instead of the traditional red.

The film was rated PG-13 by the Motion Picture Association of America for "irreverent humor throughout"; the production staff had expected this rating. However, the British Board of Film Classification passed the film as a PG with no cuts made. A BBFC spokeswoman said regarding Bart's brief nude scene, "natural nudity with no sexual content is acceptable in PG films".

=== Marketing ===
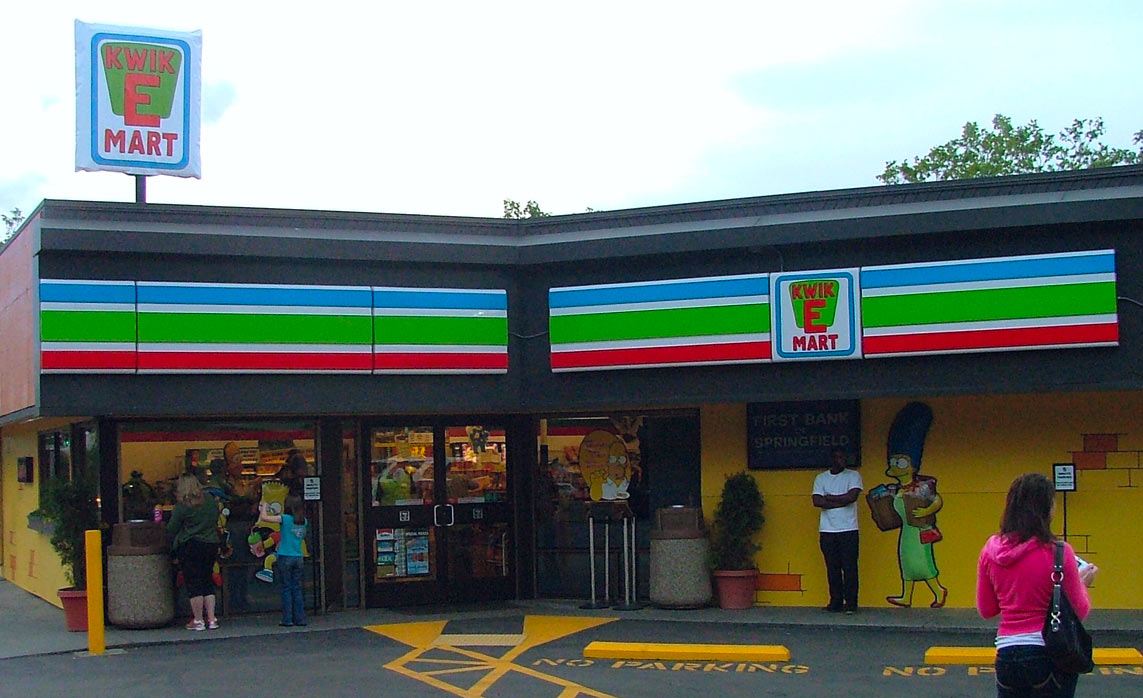
A 7-Eleven store in Seattle transformed into a Kwik-E-Mart

The convenience store chain 7-Eleven transformed 11 of its stores in the United States and one in Canada into Kwik-E-Marts, at the cost of approximately $10 million. 7-Eleven also sold Simpsons-themed merchandise in many of its stores. This included "Squishees", "Buzz Cola", "Krusty-O's" Cereal, and "Pink Movie Donuts". This promotion resulted in a 30% increase in profits for the altered 7-Eleven stores. Homer performed a special animated opening monologue for the edition of July 24, 2007 of The Tonight Show with Jay Leno, as part of another promotion.

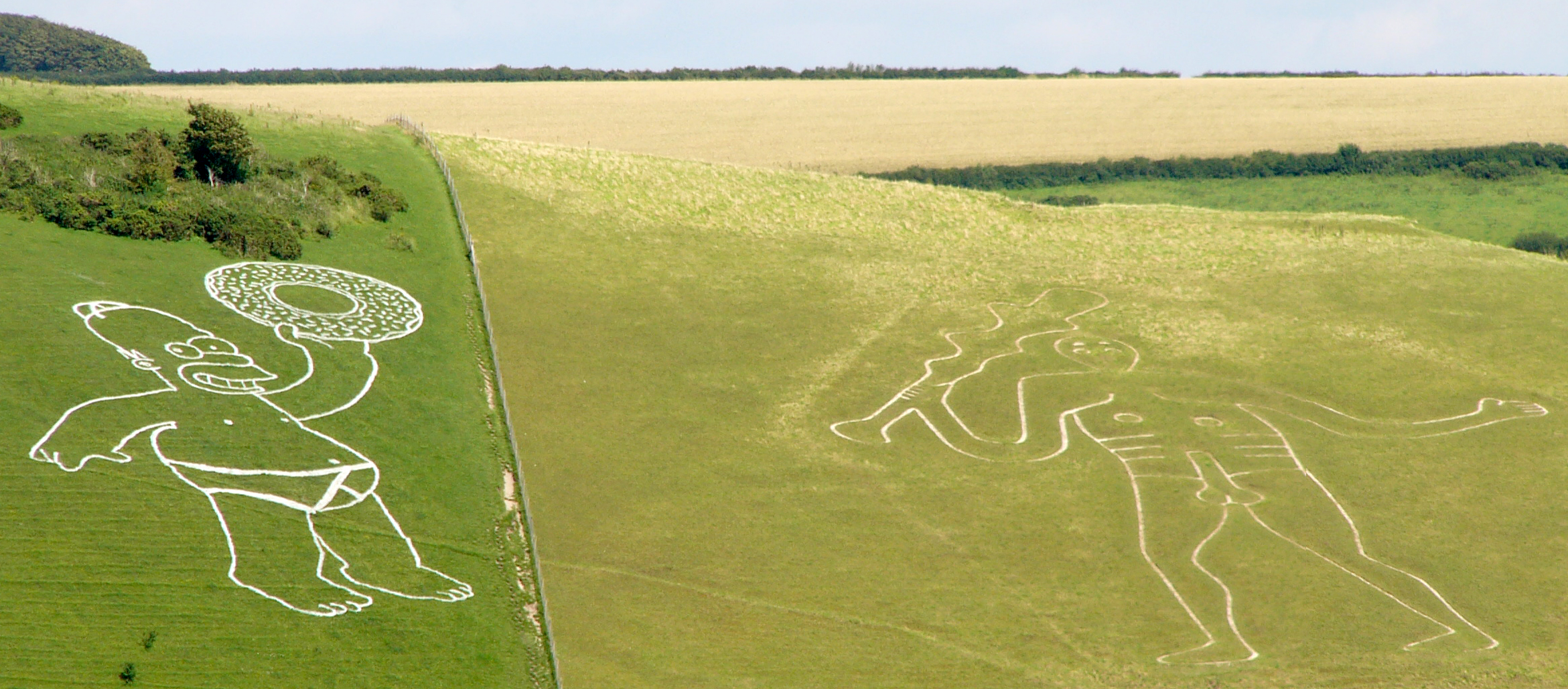
An image of Homer Simpson holding a donut painted next the Cerne Abbas Giant in South West England to promote the film

Promotions also occurred around the world. 20th Century Fox erected a giant pink donut in the town of Springfield in Canterbury, New Zealand, to celebrate being named Springfield, while in London a double decker bus-sized floating inflatable Spider Pig was set up next to Battersea Power Station. In Dorset, England, an image of Homer was painted next to the hill figure, the Cerne Abbas Giant. This caused outrage amongst local neopagans who performed "rain magic" to try to get it washed away.

McFarlane Toys released a line of action figures based on the film while EA Games released The Simpsons Game to coincide with the film's DVD release, although the plot of the game was not based on the film. Samsung released The Simpsons Movie phone, and Microsoft produced a limited edition The Simpsons Movie Xbox 360. Ben & Jerry's created a Simpsons-themed beer and donut-flavored ice cream, entitled "Duff & D'oh! Nuts". Windows Live Messenger presented their users with the opportunity to download a free animated and static content for use within their conversations. Burger King produced a line of Simpsons toy figures that were given away with children's meals, and ran a series of Simpsons-themed television adverts to promote this. JetBlue Airways held a series of online sweepstakes to win a trip to the film's Los Angeles, California premiere. They also included a channel dedicated to The Simpsons on their planes' in-flight entertainment system.

=== Home media ===
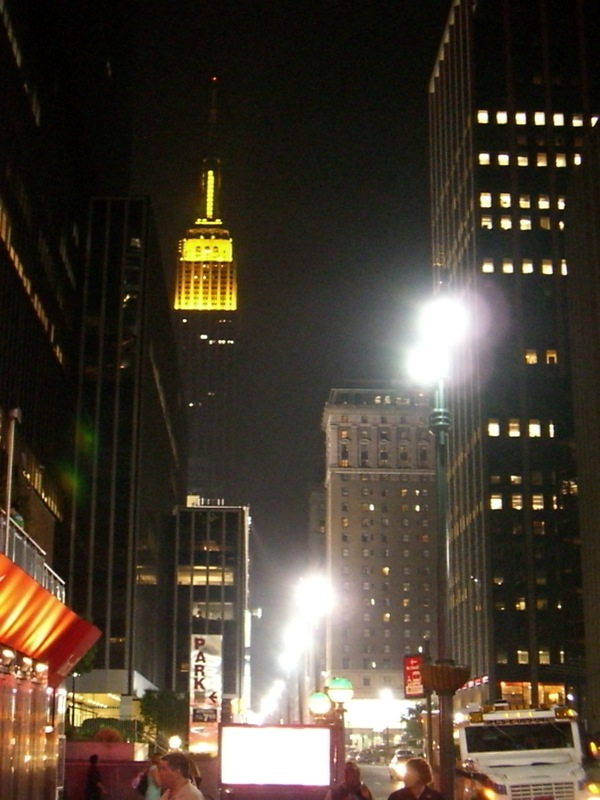
The Empire State Building was illuminated yellow to promote the film's home video release.

The film was released on DVD and Blu-ray Disc worldwide on December 3, 2007, and on December 18 in the United States by 20th Century Fox Home Entertainment. It contains commentary tracks from both the producers and animators, six short deleted scenes, and a selection of material used to promote the film release. An unfinished deleted scene of the townspeople singing the Springfield Anthem was also included on The Simpsons The Complete Tenth Season DVD box set.

Promotions for the DVD release occurred across the United States. The Empire State Building was illuminated yellow, the first time the building had ever been used as part of a film promotion. In the United Kingdom, Fox launched a £5 million advertising campaign. They also signed a £1.6 million deal with the yogurt company Yoplait, to produce a The Simpsons Movie design for their brand Frubes. In its first week it topped the U.S. DVD chart, and generated $11.8 million in rental revenue.

== Reception ==
=== Box office ===
The film earned $30,758,269 on its opening day in the United States making it the 25th-highest, and fifth-highest non-sequel opening day revenue of all time. It grossed a combined total of $74,036,787 in its opening weekend on 5,500 screens at 3,922 theaters, reaching the top of the box office for that weekend. This made it the tenth-highest revenue of all time, for an opening weekend in July, and highest among non-sequels, and the highest animated TV adaptation of all time, surpassing The SpongeBob SquarePants Movie. This outperformed the expectations of $40 million that Fox had for the release.

It set several American box office records, including highest grossing opening weekend for a non-CG animated film and for a film based on a television series, surpassing Mission: Impossible 2 (2000). It was also the third-highest grossing opening weekend for an animated film. It opened at the top of the international box office taking $96 million from 71 overseas territories, including $27.8 million in the United Kingdom, the second-highest UK opening ever for a 20th Century Fox film. It contributed to over half of the record 5.5 million people attending British cinemas that weekend. In Australia, it grossed $13.2 million, the third-highest opening weekend in the country, and the highest for an animated film. The United Kingdom is the highest-grossing country for the film outside in the United States with a $78.4 million gross overall, with Germany in second place with a $36.3 million gross overall. The film closed on December 20, 2007, with a gross of $183.1 million in the United States and a worldwide gross of $536.4 million. It was the eighth-highest-grossing film worldwide and the tenth-highest grossing in the United States of 2007.

=== Critical response ===
The film was released to mostly positive reviews. On the review aggregator website Rotten Tomatoes, 87% of 220 critics' reviews are positive, with an average rating of 7.5/10. The website's consensus reads: "The Simpsons Movie contains the hearty laughs, biting satire, and honest portrayal of an American family that makes the show so popular. And it boasts slicker animation and polished writing that hearkens back to the show's glory days." Metacritic, which uses a weighted average, assigned the film a score of 80 out of 100, based on 36 critics, indicating "generally favorable" reviews. Audiences polled by CinemaScore gave the film an average grade of "A−" on an A+ to F scale.

British newspapers The Guardian and The Times both gave the film four out of five stars. The Times' James Bone said that it "boasts the same sly cultural references and flashes of brilliance that have earned the television series a following that ranges from tots to comparative literature PhDs". The Guardian's Peter Bradshaw stated that it "gives you everything you could possibly want" and that he thought, "Eighty-five minutes [was] not long enough to do justice to 17 years of comedy genius". Ed Gonzalez praised the film for its political message, likening the Itchy & Scratchy cartoon at the beginning to President Schwarzenegger's situation later on, as well as the film's visual gags. Randy Shulman praised the cast, and described them as having "elevated their vocal work to a craft that goes way beyond simple line readings", and particularly praised Kavner who he said "gave what must be the most heartfelt performance ever". Roger Ebert gave a positive review of three out of four stars, but admitted he was "generally [not] a fan of movies spun off from TV animation". He called it "radical and simple at the same time, subversive and good-hearted, offensive without really meaning to be". Richard Corliss of Time said that the film "doesn't try to be ruder or kinkier, just bigger and better".

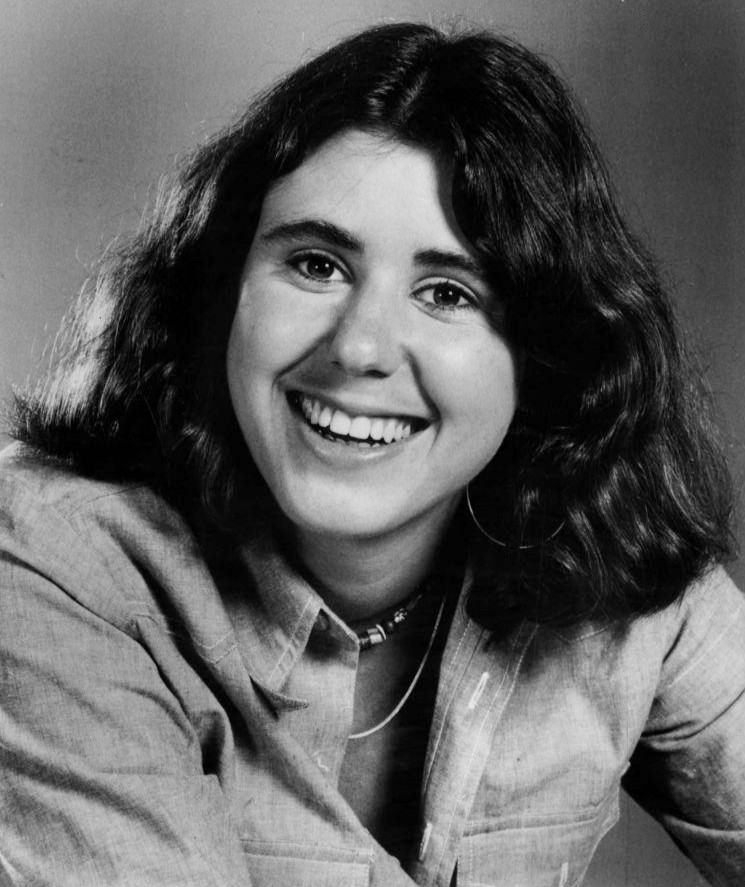
Julie Kavner (pictured in 1974) was praised for her emotional performance as Marge and was nominated for an Annie Award for voice acting. It was her last performance in a feature film until the James L. Brooks film Ella McCay.

USA Today film critic Claudia Puig said that the story did "warrant a full-length feature, thanks to a clever plot and non-stop irreverent humor". Patrick Kolan believed that the film was "easily the best stuff to come [from the Simpsons] since season 12 or 13" and praised the animation, but also said that the appearances of characters such as Comic Book Guy and Seymour Skinner were "small and unfunny". Kirk Honeycutt of The Hollywood Reporter praised the film's good nature, stating that the laughs "come in all sizes", but also noted that "little has been gained bringing the Simpsons to the screen."

Variety's Brian Lowry called it "clever, irreverent, satirical and outfitted" but that it was "just barely" capable of sustaining a running time longer than a television episode. Lisa Schwarzbaum praised the voice cast but stated that the "'action' sequences sometimes falter". When comparing the film to the early episodes of the show, Stephen Rowley concluded that the film "has more going for it than the show in its later years, but is still a long way short of what made it so invigorating". The Monthly critic Luke Davies echoed Lowry's concerns about the length: "everything moves with the whip-crack speed of a half-hour episode. And that's the paradox: it makes the film feel like three episodes strung together. We're in a cinema, and we expect something epic." He opined that "in the great arc that is the history of The Simpsons, this film will come to be seen as oddity rather than apotheosis."

More negative reception came from the magazine Empire, where reviewer Ian Nathan compared the film to New Coke, saying that "it utterly failed". Phil Villarreal believed that there were "too few laugh-worthy moments" and that "instead of stretching to new frontiers, the film rests on the familiar". Sheila Johnston criticized the pacing of the film and its joke level saying that "the overall momentum flags at times" and that it was "a salvo of comic squibs, some very funny, others limp". David Edwards agreed with this, writing that although "there's a great half-hour show rattling around...the rest is padding at its very dullest", concluding that it "isn't a terrible film, just a terribly disappointing one." Cosmo Landesman believed, "the humour seem[ed] to have lost its satirical bite and wit" and that "much of the comedy is structured around the idiocy of Homer". This assessment was shared by Carina Chocano of the Los Angeles Times, who felt that "once the movie wanders into its contemplation of mortality and meaning, the trenchancy kind of creaks and falls off." She negatively compared it to South Park: Bigger, Longer & Uncut (1999), a film similarly adapted from an animated television series, saying that, in terms of satire, it offers "nothing we don't hear every night on The Daily Show with Jon Stewart." Bruce Newman criticized the fleeting appearances of many of the show's secondary characters, and found the film to be "a disappointment".

=== Accolades ===
The Simpsons Movie won the award for Best Comedy Film at the British Comedy Awards, Best Animation at the inaugural ITV National Movie Awards, and Best Movie at the UK Nickelodeon Kids Choice Awards, beating Harry Potter and the Order of the Phoenix, Pirates of the Caribbean: At World's End, and Shrek the Third. The film's trailer won a Golden Trailer Award in the category Best Animated/Family Film Trailer at the 8th Annual Golden Trailer Awards. Forbes named the film the third best of the year, based on its box office takings and Metacritic critical response score. The film's website received a Webby Award at the 12th Annual Webby Awards in the category "Best Movie and Film Website".

At the 35th Annie Awards the film was nominated in four categories: Best Animated Feature, Directing in an Animated Feature Production, Writing in an Animated Feature Production, and Voice Acting in an Animated Feature Production for Julie Kavner. All four awards were won by Ratatouille. It was nominated for Best Animated Feature Film at the 65th Golden Globe Awards, the BAFTA for Best Animated Film, and the Producers Guild Award for Animated Theatrical Motion Picture. It also received nominations for the Satellite Award for Best Animated or Mixed Media Feature, the Chicago Film Critics Association Award for Best Animated Feature, and the Broadcast Film Critics Association Award for Best Animated Feature.

Before its release, the film received a nomination at the 2007 MTV Movie Awards for "Best Summer Movie You Haven't Seen Yet", with the award ultimately won by Transformers, and lost the Teen Choice Award for "Choice Summer Movie – Comedy/Musical", which was won by Hairspray. It was also nominated for Favorite Movie Comedy at the People's Choice Awards, losing to Knocked Up.

== Sequel ==
In June 2014, Brooks stated that he had been approached by Fox and that they had requested a second film. He added that there were no immediate plans, stating, "We've been asked to [develop it], but we haven't. We're doing a lot of other stuff". In December 2014, just prior to the broadcast of the twenty-sixth season episode "The Man Who Came to Be Dinner", Jean wrote on Twitter that the episode (which had been produced in 2012 and was originally set to air in May 2013) had been held back by himself and Brooks because it was being considered for adaptation into a sequel film as the episode was "cinematic". Jean later expanded that there was the fear of the potential film being considered "not canonical" with the TV series and the potential backlash of overcoming it by using a "memory wipe".

In July 2017, Silverman and Jean said that the sequel was in the early stages of development and stressed the toll production of the first picture took on the entire staff. On August 10, 2018, it was reported that a sequel was in development. On July 22, 2019, Groening stated that he had "no doubts" that the Walt Disney Company, which acquired 21st Century Fox early that year, would likely produce a sequel one day. In July 2021, Jean stated that discussions for the potential sequel had stalled due to the COVID-19 pandemic. In May 2024, Jean expressed his hopes for a sequel: "I want to see the animation business completely returned to what it was before the pandemic. And then, I think if that was the case, it would make sense to do The Simpsons theatrically."

On September 29, 2025, a sequel with the working title of The Simpsons 2 was announced by 20th Century Studios on Instagram. The post included a pink donut with the tagline "Homer's coming back for seconds" and confirmed a theatrical release on July 23, 2027. The release was later delayed to September 3 to avoid competition with A Minecraft Movie Squared. In August 2026, at the 2026 D23 Expo, the official title was confirmed as The New Simpsons Movie.

== See also ==
- List of films based on television programs
- List of films featuring fictional films
