= Lipstick feminism =

Feminism that maintains femininity and sexuality of women

Lipstick feminism (also known as girlie feminism or girly feminism) is a niche variety of feminism that embraces the coexistence of stereotypical concepts of femininity and female sexual empowerment. It emerged from third-wave feminism as a response to previous feminist movements that treated femininity and feminism as independent of each other.

Unlike early feminist campaigns like the Women's Suffrage Movement that focused on basic, fundamental rights of women, lipstick feminism argues that women can be feminists without ignoring their femininity or sexuality.

Lipstick feminism embraces the sensuality of womanhood and the belief that women have the right to act with passion and sexuality. In the wake of second and third-wave feminism, lipstick feminism reclaims feminine stereotypes often viewed as dis-empowering, like make-up and stilettos.

== Origins ==
Following a trend of boycotting conventionally feminine items like bras, girdles, and make-up that emerged in second-wave feminism, lipstick feminism originated from third-wave feminism's tendency to celebrate "the trappings of femininity." Where second-wave feminism viewed fashion, glamour, and beauty as restrictive and oppressive, third-wave feminism, and eventually lipstick feminism, sought to embrace such ideas. Third-wave feminism focused on reclaiming sexual agency and reconciling political beliefs with personal convictions about femininity. Some third-wave feminists embraced emblems of conventional femininity like stilettos and sexualized clothing, while others rejected such traditional images for more deviant styles like shaved heads and dyed hair. Women wanted to continue their fight for equality and engage in activism without being confined to society's image of a feminist, and thus lipstick feminism was born from the mission to reclaim sexual agency through items synonymous with conventional feminism.

== Philosophy ==
Philosophically, lipstick feminism holds that wearing cosmetics and sensual clothing can be a form of female empowerment – psychologically, socially, and politically. It proposes that confidence and self-image are tied to embracing sexual allure. Lipstick feminism's rhetoric of choice and empowerment validates overtly sexual practices for defying traditional gender roles often labeled as "the good girl," "the decent woman," "the abnegated mother," or "the virtuous sister" et aliæ.

Other feminists object that the so-called empowerment of lipstick feminism is a philosophic contradiction wherein a woman chooses to sexually objectify herself, and so ceases to be her own woman, in control neither of her self nor of her person. Feminist scholars have often discussed whether or not the decision to perform traditional gendered actions, such as shaving one's legs and wearing short skirts can be considered an act of empowerment. Feminist scholars like Fionnghuala Sweeney and Kathy Davis argue that there is a freedom that can come from understanding and embracing gender norms of sexuality as a means of freeing yourself from the stereotypes of women in society. Lipstick feminism counter-proposes that the practice of sexual allure is a form of social power in the interpersonal relations between a man and a woman, which may occur in the realms of cultural, social, and gender equality. Scholars have pointed out the contradictions between feminist viewpoints and traditional gender roles. Scholar Kathy Davis wrote, "feminist scholars need to ground their normative, theoretical critique of passion in a grounded analysis of what the experience of passion feels like and what it means to those who have it, but it also suggests contradictions between feminist theory and embodied experience are a useful starting point for reflecting critically on some of the silences within feminist theory itself."

=== Use of language ===
This movement not only worked to physically empower feminists, but linguistically as well. Lipstick feminism embraces double-standard insults by redefining their meaning and to eliminate the social stigma applied to a woman whose sexual behavior was "patriarchally" interpreted to denote "immoral woman" and libertine. This is seen with words such as:

- Chick: first used to describe women as literal chicks with the implication of cowardice and fragility, transformed into a word with the connotation of property to men. The word was applied in literature with ironic uses as a way to target the patriarchal standards set for women, creating chick literature heroines within works such as Sex and the City.
- Bitch: lipstick feminists recognize that this word is often used towards outspoken women who do not shy away from expressing themselves thus seeing it more positively.
- Slut: as lipstick feminists fight for sexual liberation, reclaiming the word slut has been imperative as it has always been used as a double-standard when discussing sexuality amongst men and women. The reclaiming of this word has helped to spur the transnational movement of the SlutWalk.

These are a few words among many, and by using linguistics to empower the movement the abrasiveness is being removed from these words, thus ensuring these labels are no longer pejorative. This redefining developed, in part, as a response to the ideological backlash against radical varieties of second-wave feminism. Redefining terms were also influenced from the negative stereotypes generated during the second wave of feminism, such as "ugly feminist" or the "anti-sex feminist". In one sense, the successes of second-wave feminism made it possible to reclaim aspects of femininity that were seen as disempowering, like make-up or stilettos.

=== Stiletto feminism ===
Stiletto feminism, a more ideologically radical variety of lipstick feminism, sees the postmodern use of fetish fashion as empowering; and extends the argument from the acceptance of makeup, to the validity of women practicing occupations specifically predicated upon female physical beauty, such as working as a striptease dancer or as a pole dancer, as well as flashing or sapphic exhibitionism.

== Criticism ==
Nineteen and early twentieth century debates criticized the practice of doing things to change or improve one's appearance. People of the time believed that beauty and virtue were intertwined, so to focus on one's beauty was abandoning the improvement of one's virtue. Sentiments began to change once marketing made "paint and powder" cosmetics more easily accessible. The stigma around beauty practices started to diminish, and began being seen as a form of self expression as well as improving one's chances to be desired for a marriage.

The issue of whether it is possible to be a feminist while embracing femininity has sparked debates within feminist circles for years. The ideology of lipstick feminism asserts that one can be traditionally feminine and still identify as a feminist, as feminism encompasses far more than superficial appearances. However, this viewpoint has faced criticism from some feminists who argue that engaging in displays of femininity and sexuality contradicts the pursuit of gender equality.

=== Choice feminism ===
Many feminists acknowledge that a woman's autonomy and freedom to make choices are fundamental principles of feminism. However, the notion of choice has become a complex and contentious topic among feminist scholars. Some feminists emphasize the importance of individual choice, valuing the freedom to express oneself in ways that align with personal preferences. They argue that any limitation on a woman's choices undermines the essence of feminism. However, there are feminists who critique the notion of individual choice, recognizing that societal structures and patriarchal norms significantly influence and constrain women's choices. They argue that viewing individual choices as purely liberating and politically acceptable can obscure the larger systemic inequalities and power dynamics that shape women's lives. By solely focusing on personal choices, there is a risk of neglecting the need for collective action to challenge and transform these oppressive structures.

== In media ==
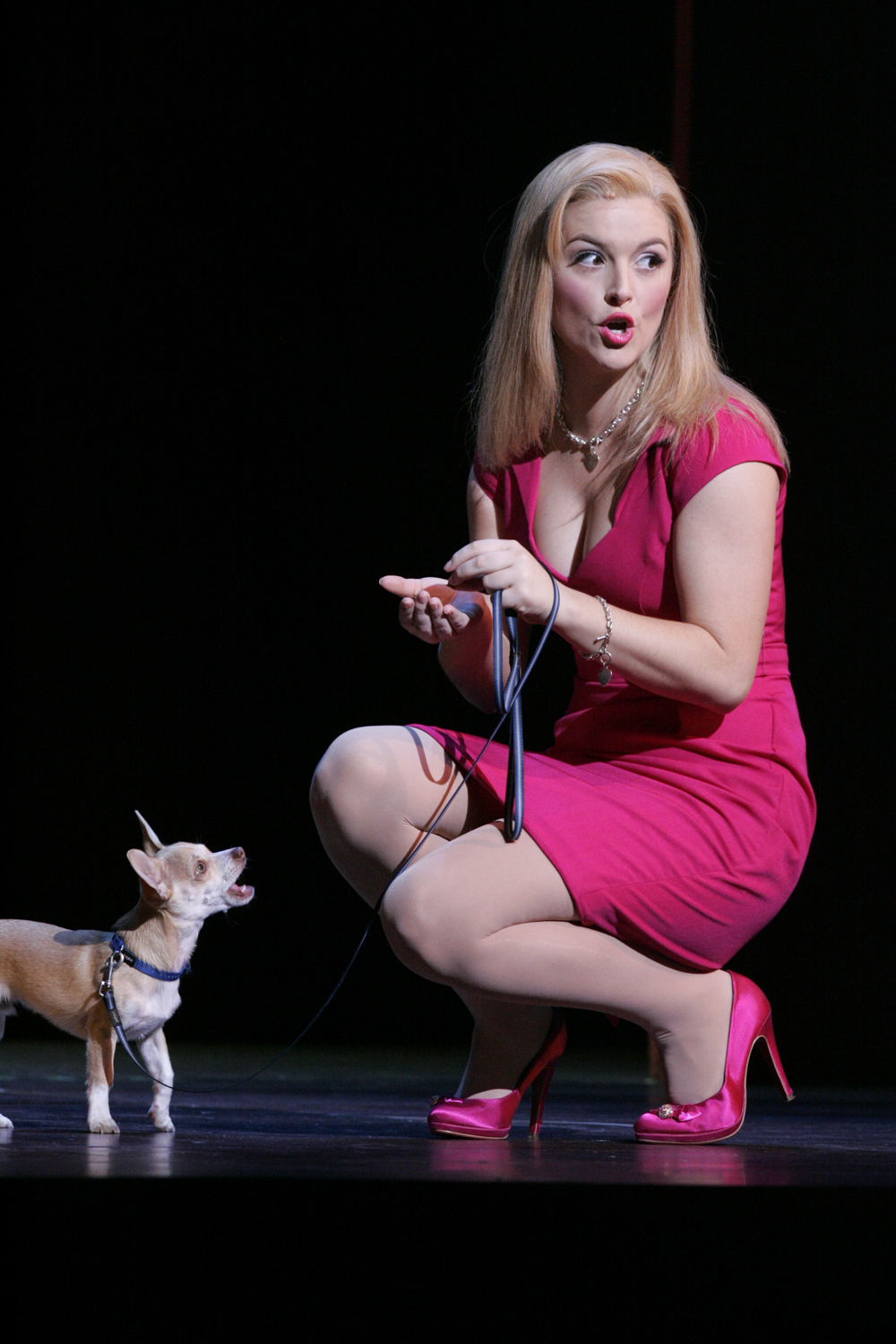
The character, Elle, in the musical Legally Blonde

Lipstick feminism has become one of the most prominent feminist themes within film, especially in the 2000s. Many of these pieces of media often depict these heroines as using their femininity to their advantage, and a refusal to conform to more normative standards that would force them to become less feminine. This movement is represented in the film Legally Blonde as it follows a former sorority girl, Elle, who gets a Juris Doctor degree from Harvard Law School, overcoming the stereotypes against blondes and triumphs as a successful lawyer without giving up her feminine qualities. She first attends law school in the hopes of getting back together with an ex-boyfriend, but she finds her passion for law and becomes serious about it. As she buckles down other students give her a hard time about how she looks and the slang she uses when she speaks, but this did not deter her as she would continue partaking in feminine acts such as getting her nails done and wearing elaborate outfits. A scene depicts one of her law professors encouraging her to apply for an internship and she hands him a pink and scented resume, a clear representation of her shamelessly using femininity as a strength.

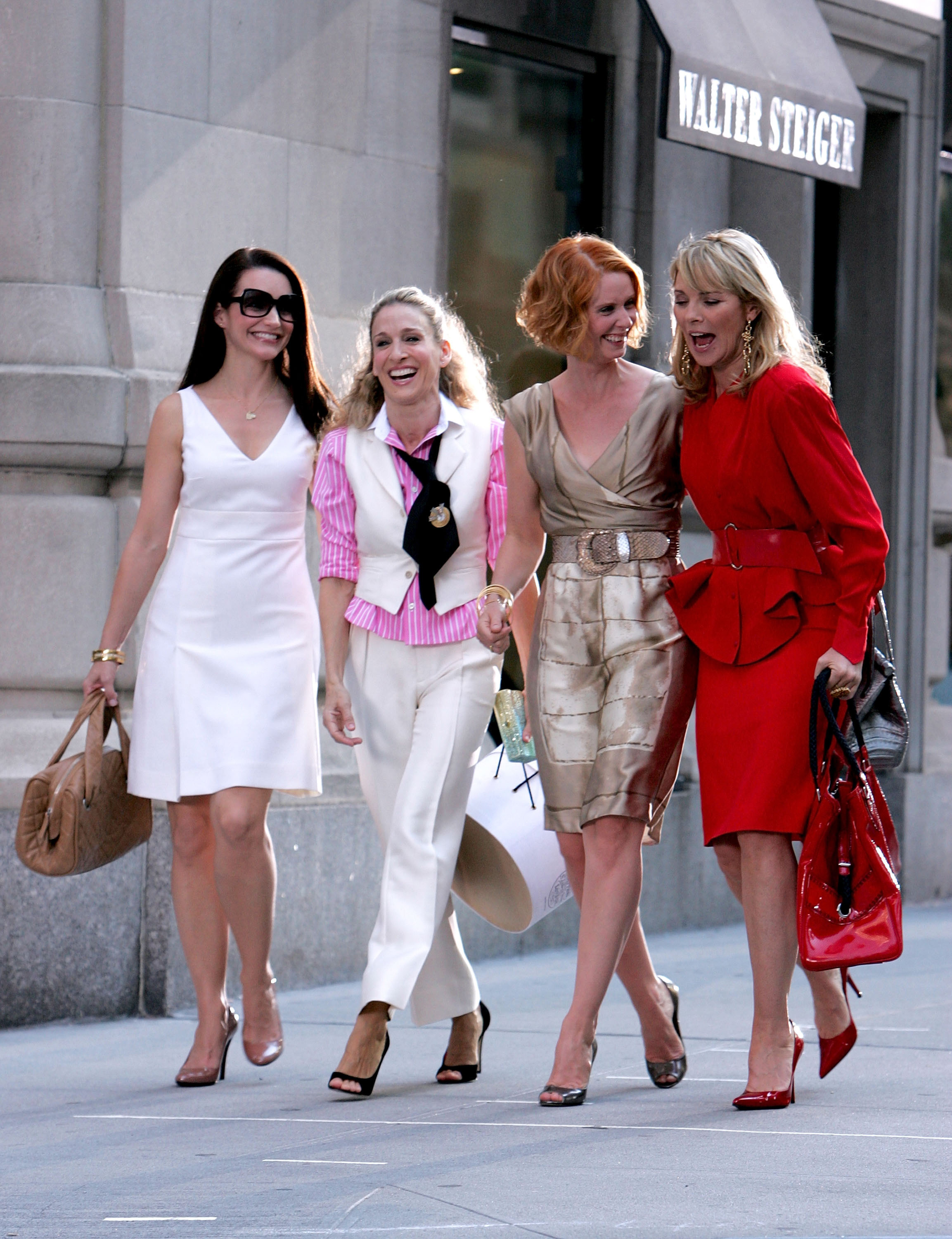
The Sex and the City main characters

Sex and the City, although having received some feminist critique, is one of the first television shows to depict female sexual autonomy and critique the narrative surrounding traditional relationships. The series follows the lives of four women living within New York City, navigating their relationships and sex lives together while tackling themes such as safe sex, promiscuity, and femininity. Each woman is challenging societal expectations and depicts qualities that television shows strayed away from at the time. Carrie, the lead, was presented as an everywoman figure with her anxieties, insecurities, and emotional needs on the forefront. Charlotte was a representation of traditional ideals as she yearned for marriage and was the least promiscuous, a quintessential hopeless romantic. Miranda was a direct and fiery lawyer who often was distrustful of the men in her life. Samantha was the oldest, in her forties while the others in their thirties, and she was the most promiscuous and confident in herself as a businesswoman. The depictions of excessive and complex breakups, career-oriented women, owning of sexuality, and the blunt dialogue all exhibit feminist ideals that broke through societal barriers at the time of release in 1998.

=== Bust magazine ===
Bust is a magazine and website that provides news, entertainment, celebrity, lifestyle, and fashion from a feminist perspective. Bust was founded in New York City in 1993 by Debbie Stoller, Laurie Henzel, and Marcelle Karp. They wanted to create a positive and outspoken women's magazine for their generation. Bust has become emblematic of "girlie" feminism, a form of "third-wave" feminist engagement that revalues activities and interests traditionally associated with femininity, such as knitting, fashion, and make-up.

== See also ==
- Feminism
- Feminist sex wars
- Girl power
- Girly girl
- Lipstick lesbian
- Postfeminism
- Sex-positive feminism
- SlutWalk
