= Girly girl =

Term used to describe females who present as especially feminine

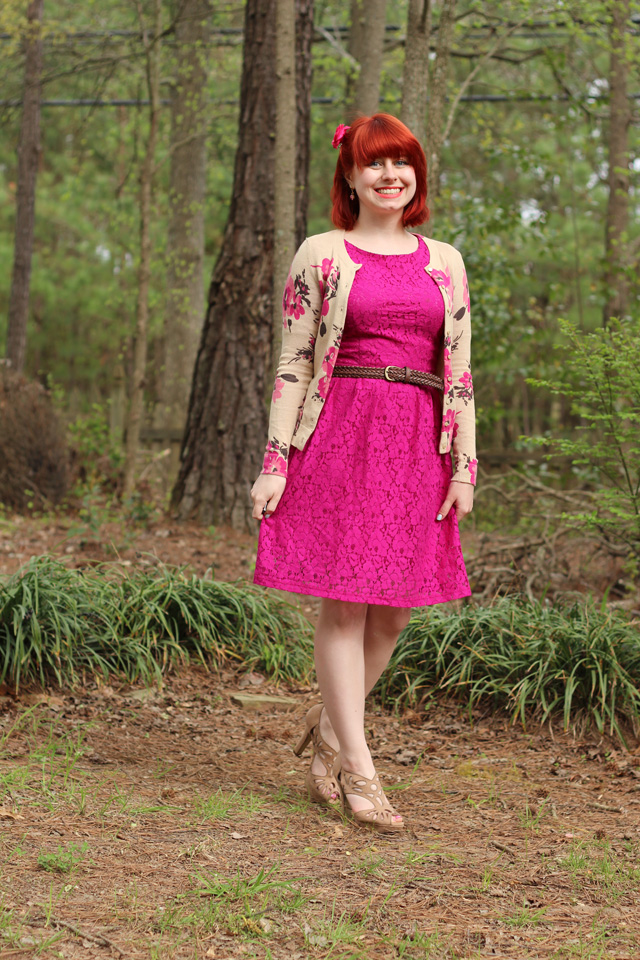
Pink dresses, high heels and hair bows are associated with girly girls

Girly girl is a term for a girl or woman who presents herself in a traditionally feminine way. This may include wearing pink, using make-up, using perfume, having long hair, long nails, wearing dresses, skirts, pantyhose and heels, and engaging in activities that are traditionally associated with femininity, such as talking about relationships.

The term is often used in a derogatory manner, but it can also be used in a more positive way, especially when considering the fluidity of gender roles. Being a "girly girl" can then be seen as a fluid and partially embodied position – a form of discourse taken up, discarded or modified for tactical or strategic purposes.

== Social determinants ==
The female opposite of a girly girl is a tomboy. The increasing prevalence of girly girls in the early 21st century has been linked to a supposed "post-feminist, post–new man construction of masculinity and femininity in mutually exclusive terms", as opposed to the more blurred gender representations of previous decades.

== See also ==
- Butch and femme
- Effeminacy
- Girlie men
- Ideal womanhood
- Lipstick feminism
- Lipstick lesbian
- Marianismo
- Masculinity
- Yamato nadeshiko
