= Richardson v Schwarzenegger =

2004 English defamation court case

- Court: High Court of Justice
- Full case name: Anna Richardson v. Arnold Schwarzenegger, Sean Walsh, Sheryl Main
- Decided: October 29, 2004
- Citation: [2004] EWHC 2422 (QB)

Court membership
- Judge sitting: Honourable Mr Justice Eady

Keywords
- defamation, forum non conveniens, venue

Richardson v Schwarzenegger was an internet defamation case heard in the English High Court of Justice (Queen’s Bench Division), on 29 October 2004. Claimant Anna Richardson, a British television presenter, claimed to have been libelled in the 2 October 2003 issue of the US publication Los Angeles Times, which was available in print and online in the UK, as a result of statements made by the gubernatorial campaign manager of Arnold Schwarzenegger, an Austrian-American actor and politician.

One key issue in this case was to determine the appropriate venue: Can a suit be brought before a United Kingdom jurisdiction for statements made by an American in California, US which are immune from suit under local law?. The High Court ruled that the libel action could be brought in England.

== Facts of the case ==
The claimant, Anna Richardson, made no claims against the authors of the allegedly defamatory Los Angeles Times article, nor against the publishers of the paper. The three defendants were (1) Arnold Schwarzenegger, (2) Sean Walsh, the campaign spokesman whose application to dismiss service ultimately came before the High Court, and (3) Sheryl Main, Schwarzenegger's publicist.

Richardson had previously claimed that Schwarzenegger had "groped" her during a December 2000 interview in London. Although Walsh was not present for the interview in question, he categorically denied the allegations and suggested that they were little more than cheap political tricks.

Richardson claimed that this denial implied that she had "deliberately and dishonestly fabricated" the allegations. She further noted that the damage to her reputation caused by the statement was felt in the UK due to the availability of the LA Times both in print and online in the UK.

Walsh claimed England was an improper forum in which to litigate the case. Walsh's attorney, Richard Spearman, described the case as follows:

… This case is about whether a spokesman for a foreign politician in a local election campaign who was asked by a foreign newspaper to respond on behalf of the foreign electoral candidate to allegations concerning the past conduct of that candidate, and he provided a response that is immune from suit under local law and is protected by qualified privilege under our system in circumstances where malice is not and could not reasonably be alleged, should nevertheless be amenable to the exorbitant jurisdiction of the English court ...

== Decision of the High Court ==
Walsh's application to set aside an order giving the claimant permission to serve her claim had previously been refused by a lower court and was the subject of the present appeal before Mr. Justice Eady of the High Court of Justice. In upholding the lower court's original order, the High Court began its analysis of the issue by noting that, as a result of Dow Jones & Co. Inc. v Gutnick, it is "...well settled now that an internet publication takes place in any jurisdiction where the relevant words are read or downloaded."

Next, the High Court reasoned similarly to the court in Calder v. Jones, 465 U.S. 783 (1984) which employs the "Effects Test" commonly used in American personal jurisdiction cases. Accordingly, the judge identified the following factors as supporting the Court's jurisdiction:

(i) The claimant was a United Kingdom citizen.

(ii) She was both resident and worked [in the UK].

(iii) She was widely known and had an established reputation in [the UK].

(iv) She had no comparable connection with any other jurisdiction, including the United States.

(v) On the basis of the presumption of damage established in Shevill v. Presse Alliance, damage to her reputation in [the UK] is presumed.

(vi) The underlying events (should there be a plea of justification) took place in London.

(vii) English law is applicable to publication in [the UK].

Unlike the Calder v. Jones test, however, the High Court did not find it necessary for Walsh to have "directly targeted" the UK, but reasoned that jurisdiction was proper because it was "arguable that the foreign politician intended or foresaw the consequences". The suit was ultimately settled.

== Holding ==
The High Court held that the correct forum is the one where it is just and reasonable for the defendant to answer for his alleged wrongdoing. The claimant was a UK citizen who lived and worked in the UK. She had an established reputation in the UK. She had no comparable connection with any other jurisdiction. Thus, damage was presumed to that reputation in the UK and the UK was the proper venue.
