= Girlie men =

Pejorative slur

Girlie men is a pejorative term that was notably used by Arnold Schwarzenegger, the 38th governor of California, to characterize opponents in the state legislature of California over the state budget.

== History of the phrase ==
Schwarzenegger borrowed the term from a series of Saturday Night Live sketches in which Dana Carvey and Kevin Nealon played bodybuilders named Hans and Franz, large men with Austrian accents. The two characters, for comic reasons, were characterized as cousins of Schwarzenegger.

== Schwarzenegger's usage ==
The term was first used by Schwarzenegger, who was supporting then Vice President George H. W. Bush, in the 1988 presidential election. He attacked Bush's opponents: "They all look like a bunch of girlie men, right?" He repeated it in the 1992 election, then campaigning for President Bush, again applying it to the Democratic candidates, as seen in the 1992 documentary Feed by Kevin Rafferty and James Ridgeway.

He used the phrase again on July 17, 2004: "If they don't have the guts to come up here in front of you and say, 'I don't want to represent you, I want to represent those special interests, the unions, the trial lawyers ... ' if they don't have the guts, I call them girlie men." He would use the term twice in the speech.

Schwarzenegger would later use the term again at the 2004 Republican National Convention, where he implored the audience not to be pessimistic about the economy, saying "Don't be economic girlie men."

Schwarzenegger was criticized by various gay rights and feminist groups. California State Senator Sheila Kuehl, who was a member of the legislature's Lesbian, Gay, Bisexual and Transgender Caucus, claimed that the governor had resorted to "blatant homophobia", stating that the phrase "uses an image that is associated with gay men in an insulting way, and it was supposed to be an insult. That's very troubling that he would use such a homophobic way of trying to put down legislative leadership." Assembly Speaker Fabian Nunez, said he was not upset by the remark but that his 13-year-old daughter was. "She's a young girl who knows the governor and really likes him a lot and didn't find the term to be a positive term, and finds it to be derogatory", Nunez said. "It was no question a very, very insensitive comment to make. I personally am not intimidated or threatened by it, but I think it really is beneath Gov. Schwarzenegger." Jeff Bissiri, the Log Cabin Republicans' California Director, defended Schwarzenegger, responding to Kuehl's statements by stating that "the Governor's use of the term 'girlie man' was not a slur aimed at the gay and lesbian community and Senator Kuehl knows that ... Where was her outrage when the Bustamante campaign referred to candidate Schwarzenegger as a 'sissy' for not agreeing to an endless series of debates?"

In an October 2018 interview with Men's Health magazine, Schwarzenegger expressed regret for using the phrase:

At the time it felt like the right thing to do. It was in my gut. I improvised it. I called them girlie men because they weren't willing to take risks. They were afraid of everything. Politicians in general want to do little things so there's no risk involved. But it was shortsighted. In the long term, it's better to not say that, because you want to work with them.

== Other public uses ==
The term, popularized initially by the Saturday Night Live sketch, received new life following Schwarzenegger's usage. New York Times opinion columnist Maureen Dowd quoted a Democratic insider who claimed that 2004 Presidential candidate John Kerry had "turned into a girlie man".

Hans and Franz, a bodybuilding duo on Saturday Night Live, often used the term to talk about "pathetic, flabby losers". This term has been carried over to the State Farm commercials.

Jack Kemp, former Republican Congressman and Vice Presidential Nominee, used the phrase in criticizing Democratic economic policies in his column "Don't be economic girlie-men".

In the video game Get Medieval the barbarian character spoofs Schwarzenegger's voice and thick accent and refers to the hordes of opponents as "girliemonsters".

Australian Minister for Finance, Mathias Cormann, who was born in German-speaking Belgium, used the phrase "economic girlie-man" to describe opposition leader Bill Shorten in 2014. The phrase had previously been used on the comedy program Shaun Micallef's Mad as Hell by the fictitious "spokesman for Finance Minister, Darius Horsham", mocking Cormann's accent; since Cormann's use, the phrase has regularly appeared in skits featuring Horsham.

== Linguistic analysis ==
In an article in the journal American Speech, linguist Edwin Battistella analyzes the development of the expression from ironic mockery of bodybuilding culture to an overt connotation of weakness and a covert connotation of effeminacy. He writes:

In all this usage, girly-man is implicitly contrasted with such terms as he-man, macho-man, or manly man. These terms bring together images of physique, strength, courage, and will in an image of comic-book manliness. The controlling male stereotype is that of the muscular action-hero male as manly and of other men (non–weight lifters, nonmacho straight men, gays) as lacking courage, strength, and decisiveness. As critics of the usage pointed out, referring to someone as a girly-man requires adopting this stereotype as an instrument of either humor or derogation. And it further entails adopting the complementary stereotype that women are not so strong or decisive as men.

Contrasting the expression girly girl with girly man, Battistella suggests that in the former the adjective intensifies the stereotype present in the noun, while in the latter the adjective negates components of the stereotype to produce a range of derisive meanings.

== See also ==
- Junior (1994 film) – Film by Ivan Reitman
- Girly girl
