= Opinion polling on the Arnold Schwarzenegger governorship =

Surveying on Governor of California tenure

Opinion polling on the governorship of Arnold Schwarzenegger began after Schwarzenegger was sworn in as Governor of California in 2003 and ended with his second term expiring in 2011.

== Political barometers ==
Polling firm	Fieldwork date		Sample size	Segment	Approve	Disapprove	No opinion	Net	Ref.
Polling firm	Start	End	Sample size	Segment	Approve	Disapprove	No opinion	Net	Ref.
Field	January 9, 2004	January 13, 2004	929	Registered voters	52%	27%	21%	25%	
Field	February 18, 2004	February 22, 2004	958	Registered voters	56%	26%	18%	30%	
Field	May 18, 2004	May 24, 2004	745	Registered voters	65%	23%	12%	42%	
Field	July 30, 2004	August 8, 2004	602	Registered voters	65%	22%	13%	43%	
Field	September 24, 2004	September 29, 2004	600	Registered voters	65%	22%	13%	43%	
PPIC	January 11, 2005	January 18, 2005	2,002	All adults	60%	33%	7%	27%	
PPIC	January 11, 2005	January 18, 2005	1,169	Likely voters	63%	32%	5%	31%	
Field	February 8, 2005	February 17, 2005	1,009	All adults	54%	35%	11%	19%	
Field	February 8, 2005	February 17, 2005	800	Registered voters	55%	35%	10%	20%	
PPIC	April 4, 2005	April 17, 2005	2,502	All adults	40%	50%	10%	10%	
PPIC	April 4, 2005	April 17, 2005	1,912	Registered voters	43%	48%	9%	5%	
PPIC	April 4, 2005	April 17, 2005	1,405	Likely voters	45%	47%	8%	2%	
PPIC	May 10, 2005	May 17, 2005	2,003	All adults	40%	49%	11%	9%	
PPIC	May 10, 2005	May 17, 2005	1,171	Likely voters	45%	46%	9%	1%	
Field	June 13, 2005	June 19, 2005	954	All adults	31%	58%	11%	27%	
Field	June 13, 2005	June 19, 2005	711	Registered voters	37%	53%	10%	16%	
PPIC	June 28, 2005	July 12, 2005	2,502	All adults	34%	51%	15%	17%	
PPIC	June 28, 2005	July 12, 2005	1,390	Likely voters	41%	49%	10%	8%	
PPIC	August 8, 2005	August 15, 2005	2,004	All adults	34%	54%	12%	20%	
PPIC	August 8, 2005	August 15, 2005	998	Likely voters	41%	50%	9%	9%	
PPIC	September 12, 2005	September 19, 2005	2,004	All adults	33%	58%	9%	25%	
PPIC	September 12, 2005	September 19, 2005	1,572	Registered voters	35%	57%	8%	22%	
PPIC	September 12, 2005	September 19, 2005	1,013	Likely voters	38%	55%	7%	17%	
PPIC	October 16, 2005	October 23, 2005	2,003	All adults	33%	58%	9%	25%	
PPIC	October 16, 2005	October 23, 2005	1,580	Registered voters	34%	56%	10%	22%	
PPIC	October 16, 2005	October 23, 2005	1,079	Likely voters	38%	57%	5%	21%	
PPIC	November 9, 2005	November 20, 2005	2,002	Special election voters	39%	56%	5%	17%	
PPIC	November 30, 2005	December 13, 2005	2,504	All adults	32%	58%	10%	26%	
PPIC	January 11, 2006	January 18, 2006	2,003	All adults	40%	52%	8%	12%	
PPIC	January 11, 2006	January 18, 2006	1,602	Registered voters	43%	50%	7%	7%	
PPIC	January 11, 2006	January 18, 2006	1,193	Likely voters	45%	48%	7%	3%	
PPIC	February 8, 2006	February 15, 2006	2,003	All adults	35%	53%	12%	18%	
PPIC	February 8, 2006	February 15, 2006	1,128	Likely voters	40%	50%	10%	10%	
PPIC	March 15, 2006	March 22, 2006	2,002	All adults	37%	52%	11%	15%	
PPIC	March 15, 2006	March 22, 2006	1,008	Likely voters	47%	45%	8%	2%	
PPIC	April 4, 2006	April 19, 2006	2,501	All adults	38%	50%	12%	12%	
PPIC	April 4, 2006	April 19, 2006	1,137	Likely voters	46%	44%	10%	2%	
PPIC	May 14, 2006	May 21, 2006	2,000	All adults	36%	52%	12%	16%	
PPIC	May 14, 2006	May 21, 2006	986	Likely voters	42%	48%	10%	6%	
PPIC	July 5, 2006	July 18, 2006	2,501	All adults	42%	44%	14%	2%	
PPIC	July 5, 2006	July 18, 2006	1,225	Likely voters	49%	43%	8%	6%	
PPIC	August 16, 2006	August 23, 2006	2,001	All adults	44%	46%	10%	2%	
PPIC	August 16, 2006	August 23, 2006	989	Likely voters	50%	42%	8%	8%	
PPIC	September 13, 2006	September 20, 2006	2,003	All adults	46%	46%	8%	0%	
PPIC	September 13, 2006	September 20, 2006	1,091	Likely voters	53%	39%	8%	14%	
PPIC	October 15, 2006	October 22, 2006	2,002	All adults	47%	45%	8%	2%	
PPIC	October 15, 2006	October 22, 2006	1,076	Likely voters	52%	41%	7%	11%	
PPIC	November 8, 2006	November 19, 2006	2,000	General election voters	60%	32%	8%	28%	
PPIC	January 11, 2007	January 18, 2007	2,014	All adults	58%	32%	10%	26%	
PPIC	January 11, 2007	January 18, 2007	1,180	Likely voters	61%	30%	9%	31%	
PPIC	March 13, 2007	March 20, 2007	2,000	All adults	51%	38%	11%	13%	
PPIC	March 13, 2007	March 20, 2007	1,122	Likely voters	56%	34%	10%	22%	
PPIC	April 3, 2007	April 17, 2007	2,500	All adults	53%	34%	13%	19%	
PPIC	April 3, 2007	April 17, 2007	1,410	Likely voters	62%	30%	8%	32%	
PPIC	May 15, 2007	May 22, 2007	2,005	All adults	53%	34%	13%	19%	
PPIC	May 15, 2007	May 22, 2007	986	Likely voters	61%	29%	10%	32%	
PPIC	June 12, 2007	June 19, 2007	2,003	All adults	57%	31%	12%	26%	
PPIC	June 12, 2007	June 19, 2007	983	Likely voters	65%	24%	11%	41%	
PPIC	June 28, 2007	July 15, 2007	2,500	All adults	52%	34%	14%	18%	
PPIC	June 28, 2007	July 15, 2007	1,238	Likely voters	59%	31%	10%	28%	
PPIC	September 4, 2007	September 11, 2007	2,003	All adults	50%	38%	12%	12%	
PPIC	September 4, 2007	September 11, 2007	1,045	Likely voters	59%	31%	10%	28%	
PPIC	October 10, 2007	October 23, 2007	2,503	All adults	51%	37%	12%	14%	
PPIC	October 10, 2007	October 23, 2007	1,447	Likely voters	59%	32%	9%	27%	
PPIC	November 27, 2007	December 4, 2007	2,002	All adults	57%	37%	6%	20%	
PPIC	November 27, 2007	December 4, 2007	1,015	Likely voters	63%	31%	6%	32%	
PPIC	January 13, 2008	January 20, 2008	2,000	All adults	50%	44%	6%	6%	
PPIC	January 13, 2008	January 20, 2008	1,099	Likely voters	52%	42%	6%	10%	
PPIC	March 11, 2008	March 18, 2008	2,002	All adults	44%	49%	7%	5%	
PPIC	March 11, 2008	March 18, 2008	1,077	Likely voters	49%	45%	6%	4%	
PPIC	April 8, 2008	April 22, 2008	2,502	All adults	41%	48%	11%	7%	
PPIC	April 8, 2008	April 22, 2008	1,406	Likely voters	45%	44%	11%	1%	
PPIC	May 12, 2008	May 18, 2008	2,003	All adults	41%	51%	8%	10%	
PPIC	May 12, 2008	May 18, 2008	1,086	Likely voters	45%	49%	6%	4%	
PPIC	July 8, 2008	July 22, 2008	2,504	All adults	43%	45%	12%	2%	
PPIC	July 8, 2008	July 22, 2008	1,401	Likely voters	49%	42%	9%	7%	
PPIC	August 12, 2008	August 19, 2008	2,003	All adults	38%	56%	6%	18%	
PPIC	August 12, 2008	August 19, 2008	1,047	Likely voters	43%	52%	5%	9%	
PPIC	September 9, 2008	September 16, 2008	2,002	All adults	38%	55%	7%	17%	
PPIC	September 9, 2008	September 16, 2008	1,157	Likely voters	42%	51%	7%	9%	
PPIC	October 12, 2008	October 19, 2008	2,004	All adults	39%	54%	7%	15%	
PPIC	October 12, 2008	October 19, 2008	1,186	Likely voters	47%	48%	5%	1%	
PPIC	October 20, 2008	November 3, 2008	2,503	All adults	40%	50%	10%	10%	
PPIC	October 20, 2008	November 3, 2008	1,526	Likely voters	45%	46%	9%	1%	
PPIC	November 5, 2008	November 16, 2008	2,003	General election voters	42%	49%	9%	7%	
PPIC	January 13, 2009	January 20, 2009	2,001	All adults	40%	51%	9%	11%	
PPIC	January 13, 2009	January 20, 2009	1,277	Likely voters	44%	46%	10%	2%	
PPIC	February 3, 2009	February 17, 2009	2,502	All adults	33%	56%	11%	23%	
PPIC	March 10, 2009	March 17, 2009	2,004	All adults	32%	56%	12%	24%	
PPIC	March 10, 2009	March 17, 2009	987	Likely voters	33%	57%	10%	24%	
PPIC	April 7, 2009	April 21, 2009	2,502	All adults	32%	55%	13%	23%	
PPIC	April 7, 2009	April 21, 2009	1,518	Likely voters	34%	55%	11%	21%	
PPIC	April 27, 2009	May 4, 2009	2,005	All adults	34%	53%	13%	19%	
PPIC	April 27, 2009	May 4, 2009	1,080	Likely voters	34%	56%	10%	22%	
PPIC	July 7, 2009	July 21, 2009	2,501	All adults	28%	59%	13%	31%	
PPIC	July 7, 2009	July 21, 2009	1,457	Likely voters	29%	61%	10%	32%	
PPIC	August 26, 2009	September 2, 2009	2,006	All adults	30%	61%	9%	31%	
PPIC	August 26, 2009	September 2, 2009	1,291	Likely voters	33%	58%	9%	25%	
PPIC	October 20, 2009	November 3, 2009	2,502	All adults	28%	60%	12%	32%	
PPIC	October 20, 2009	November 3, 2009	1,488	Likely voters	27%	64%	9%	37%	
PPIC	December 1, 2009	December 8, 2009	2,004	All adults	27%	60%	13%	33%	
PPIC	December 1, 2009	December 8, 2009	963	Likely voters	30%	60%	10%	30%	
PPIC	January 12, 2010	January 19, 2010	2,001	All adults	30%	60%	10%	30%	
PPIC	January 12, 2010	January 19, 2010	1,223	Likely voters	32%	59%	9%	27%	
Field	March 9, 2010	March 15, 2010	503	Registered voters	23%	71%	6%	48%	
PPIC	March 9, 2010	March 16, 2010	2,002	All adults	24%	64%	12%	30%	
PPIC	March 9, 2010	March 16, 2010	1,102	Likely voters	25%	64%	11%	29%	
PPIC	April 6, 2010	April 20, 2010	2,504	All adults	24%	64%	12%	30%	
PPIC	April 6, 2010	April 20, 2010	1,439	Likely voters	26%	65%	9%	29%	
PPIC	May 9, 2010	May 16, 2010	2,003	All adults	23%	65%	12%	32%	
PPIC	May 9, 2010	May 16, 2010	1,168	Likely voters	24%	66%	10%	32%	
PPIC	July 6, 2010	July 20, 2010	2,502	All adults	25%	62%	13%	37%	
PPIC	July 6, 2010	July 20, 2010	1,321	Likely voters	25%	66%	9%	41%	
PPIC	September 19, 2010	September 26, 2010	2,004	All adults	28%	64%	8%	36%	
PPIC	September 19, 2010	September 26, 2010	1,104	Likely voters	28%	66%	6%	38%	
PPIC	October 10, 2010	October 17, 2010	2,002	All adults	28%	65%	7%	37%	
PPIC	October 10, 2010	October 17, 2010	1,067	Likely voters	29%	65%	6%	36%	
PPIC	October 19, 2010	November 2, 2010	2,502	All adults	25%	62%	13%	37%	
PPIC	October 19, 2010	November 2, 2010	1,551	Likely voters	27%	63%	10%	36%	
PPIC	November 3, 2010	November 14, 2010	2,003	General election voters	32%	61%	7%	29%	
