= 2025 California Proposition 50 =

US state constitutional amendment

Proposition 50
- November 4, 2025
- Authorizes Temporary Changes to Congressional District Maps in Response to Texas' Partisan Redistricting. Legislative Constitutional Amendment.

Results
Choice	Votes	%
Yes	7,453,339	64.42%
No	4,116,998	35.58%
Valid votes	11,570,337	99.88%
Invalid or blank votes	14,056	0.12%
Total votes	11,584,393	100.00%
Registered voters/turnout	23,093,274	50.16%

Yes
90–100%
80–90%
70–80%
60–70%
50–60%
No
90–100%
80–90%
70–80%
60–70%
50–60%

California Proposition 50, officially known as the Election Rigging Response Act, is an amendment to the constitution of the U.S. state of California, which was passed by voters in a special election ballot on November 4, 2025. At the urging of California governor Gavin Newsom, the proposition was put on the ballot by the Democratic-controlled California State Legislature. Approved by 64.4% of voters, the proposition's purpose was to redraw the state's congressional districts, replacing the ones drawn by the bipartisan California Citizens Redistricting Commission during the earlier 2020 redistricting cycle. The new districts will be used for the 2026 United States House of Representatives elections through the 2030 elections. Following the 2030 census, congressional redistricting authority will return to the independent commission under the normal decennial process.

The map defined in Proposition 50 is a Democratic gerrymander intended to offset the gerrymander by Texas Republicans, both of which are part of the broader 2025–2026 United States redistricting effort. It redraws several congressional districts to incorporate larger shares of urban and suburban Democratic voters, increasing Democratic registration advantages in competitive districts and converting several Republican-leaning seats into Democratic-leaning ones. Republicans have responded to Proposition 50 with legislation, their own propositions, and litigation.

Republicans challenged the proposition in court both before the election, as well as after it was passed by the voters, but their legal efforts were exhausted when the Supreme Court of the United States refused to hear the appeal.

== Background ==
In June 2025, Republican lawmakers in Texas first proposed gerrymandering the state's congressional district lines to favor Republicans. In July, Greg Abbott, the Governor of Texas, called a special session of the Texas Legislature to discuss redistricting. Texas Democrats in the state House of Representatives fled the state in an effort to break quorum and stall the redistricting effort.

Gavin Newsom, the governor of California, first proposed that California could gerrymander its own congressional district maps to favor Democrats in an effort to offset potential gains from Texas's gerrymandering. The California Citizens Redistricting Commission is an independent crosspartisan body that currently handles redistricting in the state. The commission was first established in 2008 by Proposition 11 with a mandate for drawing districts for the State Legislature and the Board of Equalization.

With the passage of Proposition 20, the commission's power was expanded in 2010 to also draw congressional districts. Newsom proposed that a special election be called to temporarily pause the commission and return redistricting power to the California Legislature until the end of the decade. Because both Propositions 11 and 20 were voter-approved amendments to the state constitution, any such changes to the redistricting power would also require a voter-approved constitutional amendment.

On August 11, 2025, Newsom sent a letter to Donald Trump, stating that California would pause any mid-decade redistricting effort if other states called off their efforts. Two days later, Newsom announced that the deadline had passed and he would move forward with his own redistricting effort.

== Passed map ==
Map of California's congressional districts as set by the California redistricting commission (effective 2023–2027) Interactive map version

Passed map under California Proposition 50 (effective 2027–2033 starting with the 2026 elections) Interactive map version

The new map was drawn by Democratic redistricting expert Paul Mitchell, and formally submitted to the legislature by the Democratic Congressional Campaign Committee. Proponents of the maps argued that the map was more compact than the previous map, with fewer city and county splits, and with the majority of districts changed by less than 10%, although certain cities, such as Lodi, will be newly split. Non-partisan observers saw it as a gerrymandering; for example, analyst Nathaniel Rakich described the maps as an "aggressive Democratic gerrymander" that will more than double the bias in the current map as a result of simultaneously cracking Republican districts and unpacking extremely Democratic districts through absorbing more-Republican areas.

It targets five seats currently held by Republicans:

- CA-01 (James Gallagher): The district loses Republican-leaning metropolitan areas in the Sacramento Valley (Redding area, Yuba–Sutter area), while gaining Democratic-leaning areas around Santa Rosa. The northern portions will join areas of the North Coast and Marin County in the Democratic-leaning 2nd district, while the southern portions will join North Bay communities and Davis in the 4th district.
- CA-03 (Kevin Kiley): The district will lose many Republican-leaning suburbs and exurbs of Sacramento in Placer County (Roseville, Lincoln), while gaining Democratic-leaning areas from Sacramento proper and its inner suburbs. The Republican-leaning areas will be moved into the 4th district and the 6th district.
- CA-22 (David Valadao): The district will gain Democratic-leaning areas in Fresno, while losing some Republican-leaning areas of Hanford, Tulare and Porterville.
- CA-41 (Ken Calvert): The old district, currently based in Riverside County, will effectively be split up among adjacent districts, with the new 41st district being based in Democratic-leaning areas of eastern Los Angeles County and northern Orange County. Much of its Republican core will be moved into the 40th district.
- CA-48 (Darrell Issa): The district will lose Republican-leaning areas in the Temecula Valley and most of east San Diego County, while gaining Democratic-leaning cities in the Coachella Valley and north San Diego County such as Palm Springs, Vista and San Marcos. The Republican-leaning areas will then be split among the strongly Democratic San Diego-based districts.

The new map will also decrease the competitiveness of several swing districts held by Democrats:

- CA-09 (Josh Harder): The district gains more East Bay cities. Based on votes cast in the 2024 presidential election, the Democratic advantage will increase by 13.1 percentage points.
- CA-13 (Adam Gray): The district takes in a large portion of strongly Democratic areas in Stockton, while losing more conservative areas in Fresno County. As a result, the Democratic advantage will increase by 5.5 percentage points.
- CA-21 (Jim Costa): The district gains more areas of Fresno proper and Clovis, and loses Republican-leaning towns such as Exeter. The Democratic advantage will increase by 2.2 percentage points.
- CA-27 (George T. Whitesides): The district gains areas Democratic-leaning areas in the San Fernando Valley while losing Republican-leaning areas in the Antelope Valley. The Democratic advantage increases by 5.5 percentage points.
- CA-45 (Derek Tran): The district gains parts of cities such as Norwalk and Santa Ana, while losing cities such as Brea and Placentia. The Democratic advantage will increase from 1.5 to 4 percentage points.
- CA-47 (Dave Min): The district gains Democratic-leaning cities such as Tustin and Aliso Viejo and loses conservative cities such as Huntington Beach and Newport Beach The Democratic advantage will increase from 4 to 10 percentage points.
- CA-49 (Mike Levin): The district takes in parts of northern San Diego and loses South Orange County cities such as Dana Point which lean Republican. The Democratic advantage will increase by 4 percentage points.

As a result of cracking Republican votes, many districts will become less Democratic-leaning. In six districts, the Democratic voter registration advantage will decrease by a margin of more than 10 percentage points:

- CA-02 (Jared Huffman): −20.9%
- CA-04 (Mike Thompson): −17%
- CA-07 (Doris Matsui): −17.1%
- CA-08 (John Garamendi): −10.1%
- CA-42 (Robert Garcia): −19.5%
- CA-50 (Scott Peters): −11.6%

However, all six districts will still favor the Democrats.

The new map is expected to help one Republican who represents a swing district:

- Young Kim (CA-40). The district will lose many cities in Orange County, while gaining many Republican-leaning areas of Riverside County from the current 41st and 48th districts. As a result, the Republican advantage will increase by 9.7 percentage points, effectively being repurposed into a Republican pack.

In 23 districts (out of 52), the change will be 2 percentage points or less.

In terms of the impact of the new maps on protected groups under the federal Voting Rights Act, a study from Caltech and Cal Poly Pomona found that the number of Latino majority districts will stay the same and two additional districts where Latinos make up 30–50% of the citizen voting age population will be added. The UCLA Asian American Studies Center found that the number of Asian American/Pacific Islander plurality districts will increase from three to five.

== Legislative history ==
Three actions were necessary to place Proposition 50 on the ballot:

1. Pass Assembly Constitutional Amendment 8, which is the amendment submitted for approval to California voters to redistrict the state
2. Pass Senate Bill 280 to call the election, assign the proposition number, and prohibit any candidate from using the title "incumbent" in the June 2026 congressional election should the measure pass
3. Pass Assembly Bill 604 to assign each census block within the counties to a congressional district.

SB 280 was introduced on August 18, (Note: A bill numbered SB-280 was introduced February 5, 2025. On August 18 the content of the original bill was removed and replaced with the bill as passed into law (with very minor modifications) on August 21.) and a legislative vote occurred in both chambers on August 21. A two-thirds supermajority was needed to place the measure on the ballot. The California State Assembly surpassed the 54 votes needed for a supermajority by passing the bill on a 57 to 20 vote. (Note: In the State Assembly, all 57 votes for the bill were from Democrats. All Republicans, joined by one Democrat, Jasmeet Bains, voted against. Two Democrats, Dawn Addis and Alex Lee did not cast a vote) Hours later, the California State Senate surpassed the 27 votes needed for a supermajority by approving the bill on a 30 to 8 vote. (Note: In the State Senate, two Republicans (Marie Alvarado-Gil and Kelly Seyarto) did not cast a vote. All other state senators voted along party line with Democrats voting for the bill, and Republicans voting against the bill.) Governor Newsom signed it into law later in the day. ACA 8 also passed by that same vote tally, although as a legislative constitutional amendment it did not need the governor's signature. ACA 8 was chaptered by the Secretary of State on August 21, 2025, at Resolution Chapter 156, Statues of 2025. AB 604, which set the boundaries of the districts, passed 56 to 20 in the Assembly and 30 to 9 in the Senate. (Note: Similar to SB-280, AB-604 was introduced February 13, 2025, and on August 18 the content of the original bill was removed and replaced with the bill as passed into law on August 21 with no additional modifications.) (Note: The differences between the roll-call votes for SB 280 and AB 604 were: in the Assembly Mia Bonta did not cast a vote for AB 604 but voted for SB 280, and in the Senate, Kelly Seyarto voted no on AB 604 and did not cast a vote on SB 280.)

== Republican response ==
=== Legislation ===
California State Assembly minority leader James Gallagher, along with a few other Republican cosponsors, introduced a joint resolution to split California into two states.

=== Counter-propositions ===
Various attempts were made to put propositions on the 2026 general election ballot for amendments to the state's constitution in response to Proposition 50. To put a proposed constitutional amendment on the ballot requires gathering signatures of voters, with the minimum number set at 8% of the number of valid votes cast in the previous gubernatorial election (874,641 signatures). The signatures must be collected within 180 days, but turned in no later than 131 days before election day (June 25, 2026). Ultimately, neither measure collected the required number of signatures.

- On October 22, 2025, the Secretary of State authorized Republican Assemblyman Carl DeMaio to begin gathering signatures for a proposed proposition of a constitutional amendment to target state lawmakers who supported the proposition. Titled "Penalize Politicians Who Manipulate Their Own Districts Initiative," DeMaio's proposal would bar any state lawmaker who voted in favor of Proposition 50 from running for office for ten years. DeMaio's deadline to gather the 874,641 signatures needed to place the proposition on the ballot is April 20, 2026.
- The day after the Proposition 50 passed, Republican activist and attorney James V. Lacy filed paperwork for a constitutional amendment to undo Proposition 50 and revert for the 2028 and 2030 congressional elections to the district lines that were drawn in 2021 by the Citizens Redistricting Commission.

=== Litigation ===
==== Pre-election ====
Four California state legislators (state senators Tony Strickland and Suzette Martinez Valladares and assemblymembers Tri Ta and Kate Sanchez) filed a lawsuit with the California Supreme Court asking the court to block the vote in the State Legislature on the ground that state law required a 30-day waiting period before voting on the bill. On August 20, the California Supreme Court rejected the motion by the four legislators, paving the way for a vote the following day. On August 25, after the bill became law, the same four legislators sued again in the state Supreme Court. In their emergency lawsuit, the legislators claim that the proposition is a violation of citizens' rights to have the California redistricting commission draw congressional districts. The California Republican Party announced that it was backing the plaintiffs, who were represented by a law firm founded by U.S. Assistant Attorney General Harmeet Dhillon. The California Supreme Court also rejected the second lawsuit.

On September 4, political advisor Steve Hilton, a Republican candidate in the 2026 California gubernatorial election, filed a lawsuit in the U.S. District Court for the Central District of California, asking them to stop Proposition 50, arguing that the proposition did not account for changes in the state's population since the 2020 Census and would hence violate the "one-person, one vote". On September 25, Hilton asked for an injunction with the court, after Governor Newsom and Secretary of State Shirley Weber failed to respond to the suit within 21 days, as typically required by federal law. An official within the office of Governor Newsom told the Fresno ABC affiliate KFSN-TV that they did not respond because they were not properly served. On October 3, Hilton's preliminary injunction was filed with the district court. On October 24, Judge Kenly Kato denied the petition to enjoin the proposition, stating that the lawsuit could continue after the election if the proposition passes.

On September 5, U.S. Representative Ronny Jackson (R-TX) sued both Newsom and Weber in the U.S. District Court for the Northern District of Texas, arguing that the legislation risked "diluting Plaintiff's legislative power and the voice of Texas voters". A petition for a temporary injunction was denied, and the case was dismissed on October 23 by Judge Matthew Kacsmaryk for inability to demonstrate a cognizable injury. A second lawsuit filed by Jackson, which only differed from the prior suit with the addition of California U.S. Representative Darrell Issa (R) as a co-plaintiff, was dismissed by Kacsmaryk on October 31 on the same grounds.

On August 25, the day that the four Republican state legislators filed their second lawsuit, President Trump announced that he will ask the United States Justice Department to sue in federal court to block Proposition 50. Newsom responded in a tweet, "BRING IT".

==== Post-election ====
===== California Republican Party =====
The day after Proposition 50 passed, the California Republican Party, represented by Harmeet Dhillon, filed a lawsuit to block implementation of the new map, alleging that it favored Hispanic voters, in violation of the U.S. Constitution's Fourteenth and Fifteenth Amendments. Eighteen individuals joined the California Republican Party as plaintiffs in the case including Assemblymember David Tangipa, Walnut city councilmember Eric Ching, former San Benito County supervisor Peter Hernandez, and McFarland mayor Saul Ayon. On November 13 the United States Department of Justice intervened as a plaintiff, with United States Attorney General Pam Bondi characterizing Proposition 50 as "a brazen power grab that tramples on civil rights and mocks the democratic process".

Governor Newsom, who is a defendant in the lawsuit, responded to the lawsuit through a spokesperson saying that "these losers lost at the ballot box and soon they will also lose in court."

The lawsuit was heard by a three judge panel in the United States District Court for the Central District of California. The members of the panel included Josephine Staton, an Obama appointee, Wesley Hsu, a Biden appointee, and Kenneth K. Lee, a Trump appointee. Deliberations began December 15 and on January 14, 2026, two of the three judges on the panel, Staton and Hsu, voted to uphold the passed map, and Lee dissenting. Lee based his decision on statements made by Paul Mitchell, a redistricting expert who drew up the maps, who said that District #13 was drawn up with race being a predominant factor. Staton and Hsu called the focus on District #13 (out of 52 districts) a strawman argument.

Immediately after the ruling was announced, the California Republican Party announced that it will seek an emergency injunction from the Supreme Court of the United States to block implementation of the new maps. The defendants, in their brief to the Supreme Court, cited the Supreme Court's order in the 2025 Texas redistricting case which explicitly calls out the redistricting proposed by Proposition 50 as constitutional, and they also cited Bondi's characterization of Proposition 50 as a "power grab". On February 4, the Supreme Court denied the appeal without comment or dissent.

===== Public Interest Legal Foundation =====
On December 4, 2025, the Virginia-based conservative legal group called Public Interest Legal Foundation filed a lawsuit in Federal Court seeking to block the implementation of Proposition 50. In their lawsuit, the group alleges that Proposition 50 violates the 15th Amendment to the United States Constitution as well as the Voting Rights Act.

The Public Interest Legal Foundation also filed an amicus brief with the U.S. Supreme Court in the case against Proposition 50 in which the California Republican Party was the plaintiff (see subsection above).

== Election logistics ==
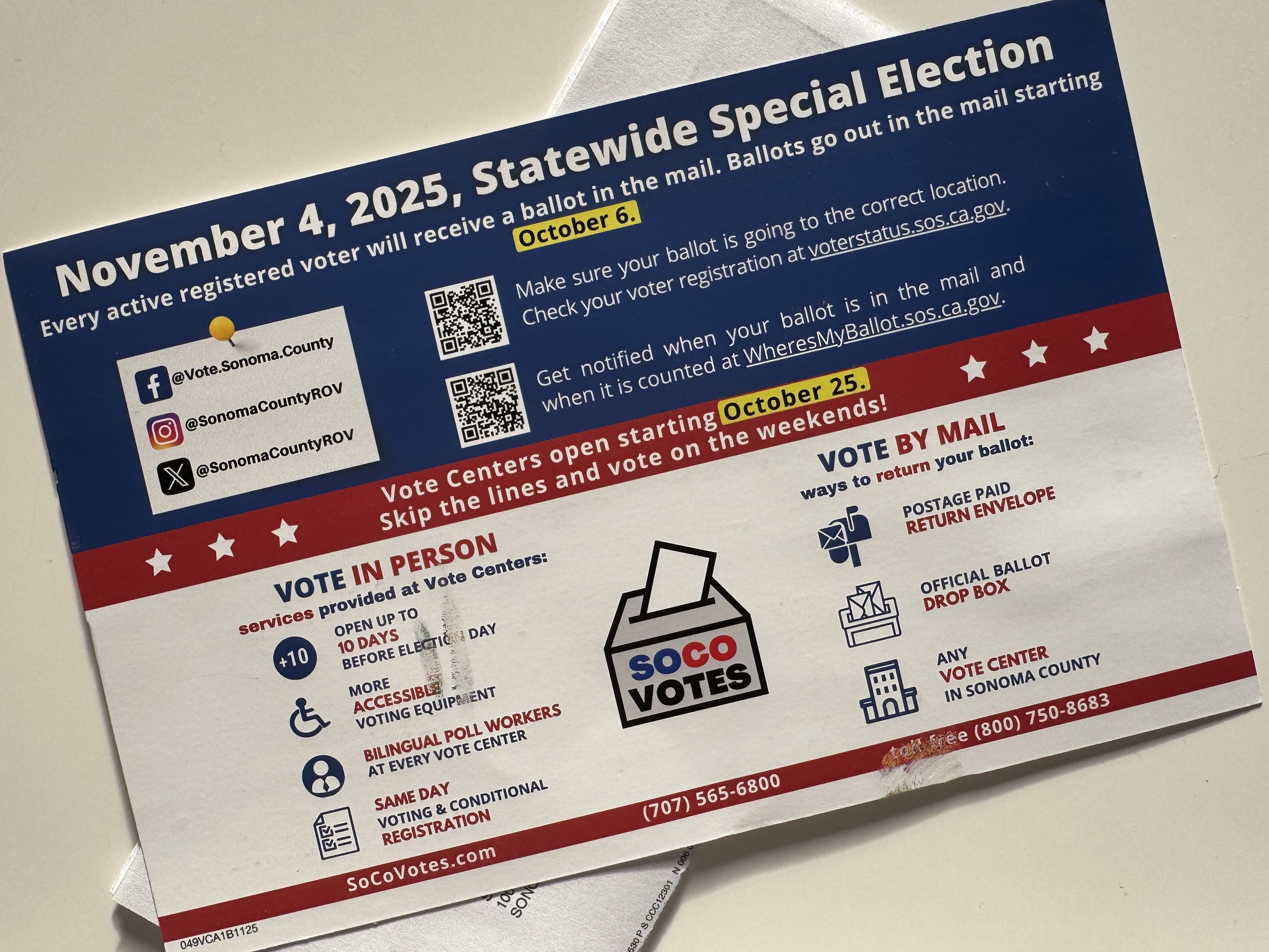
A postcard with election information that was sent to voters in Sonoma County for the special election

The initial estimated cost for the special election was $282 million, of which $251 million would be incurred by the counties to conduct the election and reimbursable by the state.

Vote by mail ballots were sent out to all 23 million California voters, with the first ballots being returned on October 6. By October 24, 18% of the ballots mailed out (about 4 million) were already returned. Although the California Republican Party was urging Republican voters to mail their ballots back as soon as possible, on October 26 Donald Trump urged voters not to mail their ballots back, but to vote in person instead.

=== Voter information guide error ===
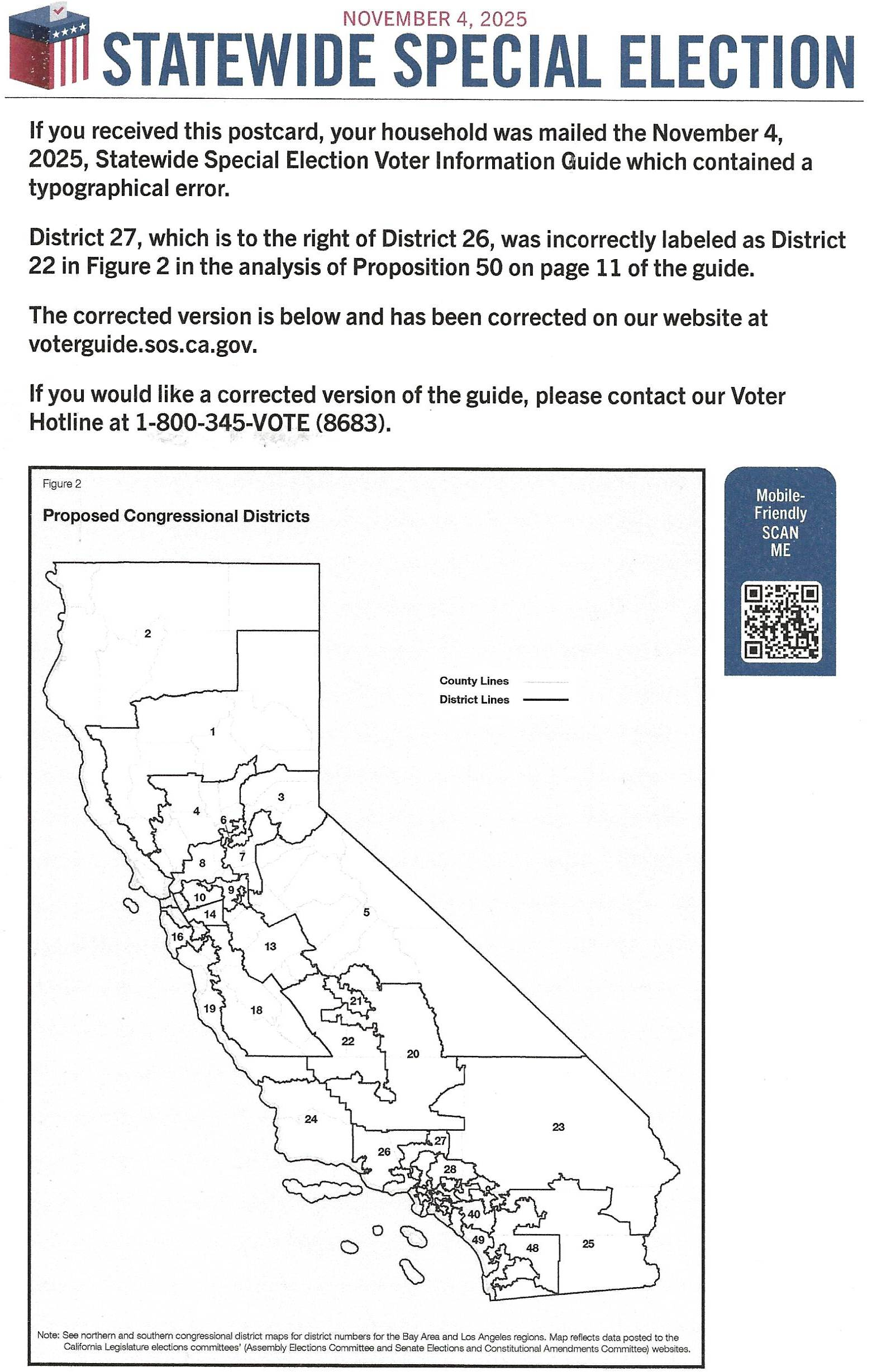
Image of a postcard mailed by the California Secretary of State to voters who received a voter information guide with a typo

The initial version of the voter information guide contained a typographical error in the labeling of one of the congressional districts. Eight million copies of the voter guide had already been sent out before the error was discovered. Voters who had received the erroneous voter guide received a postcard with a correction. The rest of the voters received a revised version of the voter guide. Secretary of State Shirley Weber blamed the Legislative Analyst's Office for the error, and said that the office would bear the estimated $3 to $4 million for the additional costs incurred as a result of the error.

=== Sacramento County return envelope issue ===
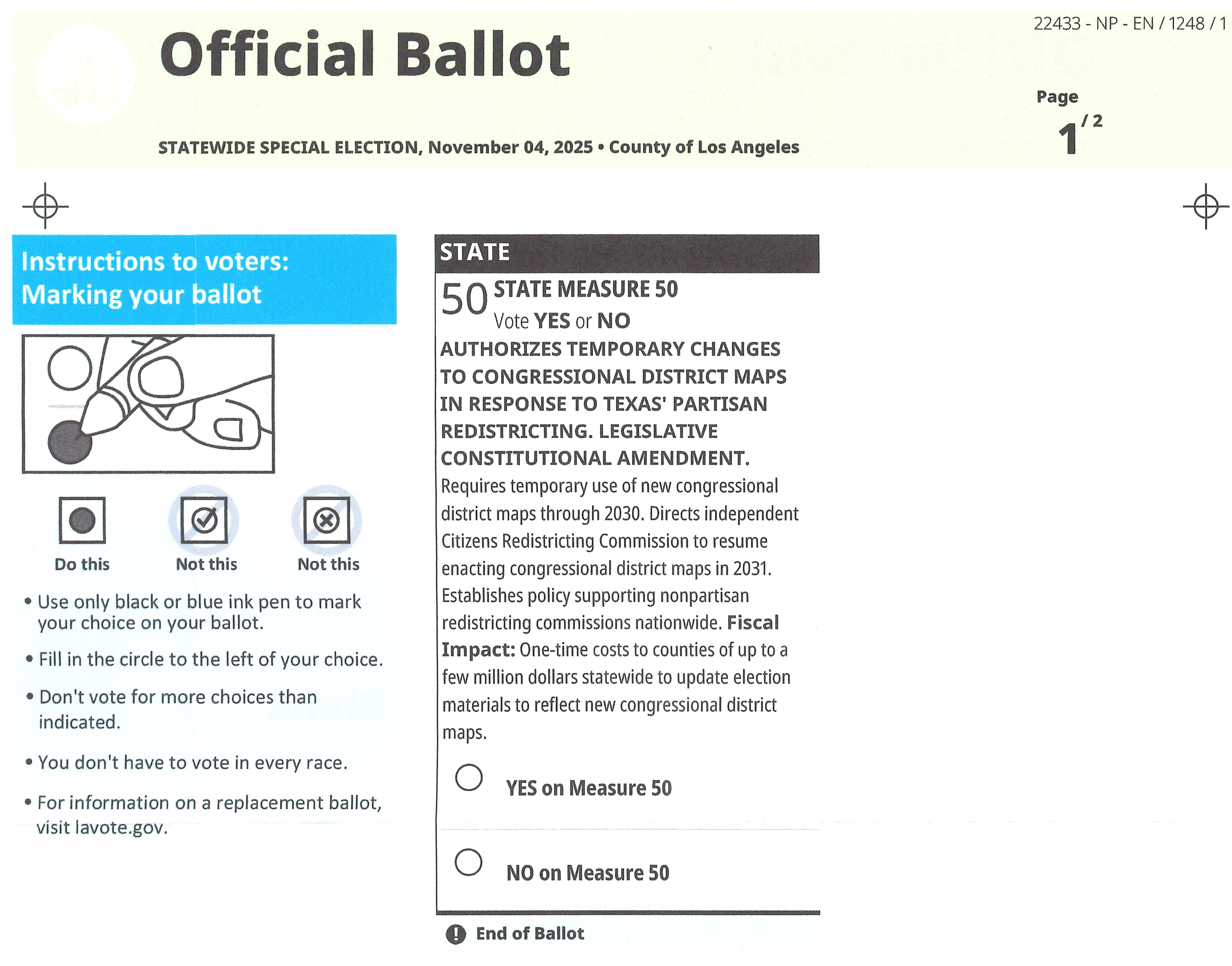
A Proposition 50 mail-in ballot sent to voters in Los Angeles County

In mid-October, voters in Sacramento County reported that the return envelopes they received along with their mail-in ballots could reveal their marked choices through a small hole in the envelope if the ballot is folded such that the hole is lined up with the markings on the ballot. County election officials confirmed the reports and explained that the small holes had various purposes, chief among them to be able to see whether the return envelope contains the ballot. To avoid exposing the marked choices on the ballot, county election officials recommended that voters fold their ballot with the markings inside the fold.

Steve Hilton, a Republican candidate for the 2026 gubernatorial election who had previously filed a lawsuit challenging the validity of the special election, demanded the election be cancelled due to the flawed design of the envelopes in Sacramento County. Hilton described the issue as "another example of the corruption and incompetence rigging California's elections".

=== Allegations of federal intimidation ===
In response to a request by Corrin Rankin, chair of the California Republican Party, the Trump administration announced on October 24 that the Department of Justice would deploy election monitors to polling sites in California. Rankin's request cited "reports of irregularities" which she feared would "undermine either the willingness of voters to participate in the election or their confidence in the announced results of the election". California Secretary of State Shirley Weber criticized the move as voter intimidation "masquerading as oversight". (Note: The Trump administration's announcement also included sending similar monitors for the concurrent elections in New Jersey.)

Another dispute came up when Governor Newsom raised the possibility that the Immigration and Customs Enforcement (ICE) might raid polling places as an intimidation tactic. ICE officials responded that they were "not planning operations targeting polling locations", but would not be deterred from going to a polling place if "a dangerous criminal alien" were to approach a polling center.

== Riverside County investigation ==
In 2026, the Riverside Election Integrity Team (a citizen's watchdog election group) published their findings of the 2025 election results in Riverside County. The group alleged a nearly 46,000 vote discrepancy between counted and received ballots in the election. The group found that handwritten logs showed about 611,000 votes cast in Riverside County during the election, while a machine count showed over 657,000 counted votes. Following their investigation, the group presented their findings to the Moreno Valley sheriff's station. The watchdog investigation was completed with the help of Shasta County's Registrar of Voters, Clint Curtis.

In a response, Riverside County's Registrar of Voters, Art Tinoco, denied the allegations, claiming the actual vote discrepancy was 103. Tinoco argued the handwritten logs count were inaccurate due to human error. Following this, the Riverside County Sheriff's Department began an investigation into the watchdog group's claims. Riverside County cooperated with the investigation.

In March 2026, Riverside County Sheriff Chad Bianco seized over 656,000 ballots to recount as a part of the department's investigation. The sheriff's department seized the ballots after obtaining warrants from county Superior Court Judge Jay Kiel. Bianco obtained a total of three judicial warrants related to the investigation, the first on February 9 and the other two in March. Bianco distanced himself from the investigation, due to his candidacy in the 2026 gubernatorial election. According to Bianco, Judge Kiel ordered that a "special master" be appointed to oversee the ballot recount; the Riverside County Sheriff's Office was working alongside the court to select an appointee.

The ballot seizure led to backlash from state Democrats; California Attorney General Rob Bonta filed an emergency petition in the California Courts of Appeal, in a bid to halt the investigation. Bonta accused Bianco of "openly defying the Attorney General's lawful directives". The court denied Bonta's request, noting that his petition was filed in the wrong court, and allowed the sheriff's department to proceed with the investigation. Bianco subsequently accused Bonta of corruption, saying "Why would you interfere and obstruct an investigation instead of assist? What are you afraid of?"

Following this, Bonta filed a second petition, this time in the Riverside County Superior Court. A hearing for the second petition was then set for March 30, before being postponed to April 2. Separately, the UCLA Voting Rights Project filed their own legal challenge, asking the California Supreme Court to halt the fraud investigation.

On March 29, 2026, Bianco announced that the investigation would be placed on hold for the time being, "because of the politically motivated lawsuits and court filings". On April 9, 2026, the California Supreme Court halted the investigation. Bianco stated that he was "technically...very happy" with the ruling, adding "we’ll just continue fighting for this for you, and we’ll make sure that an investigation...is completed and not swept under the rug, as our attorney general would like to happen."

On September 24, 2026 the Supreme Court of California ruled unanimously against Bianco in both cases, in Bonta v. Bianco that the court upheld the oversight authority of the attorney general which includes the ability to issue binding directives to county sheriffs in ongoing investigations to ensure proper enforcement of state laws. In Cervantes v. Bianco the court upheld state elections code which requires voted ballots must always remain even in active investigations in the hands of elections officials, and that both the criminal warrant authorizing the seizure and the seizure itself were unlawful, and that they must be returned.

== Campaign ==
Support for the measure was expected to be highly partisan, with supporters of the measure likely being members of the Democratic Party, while those in opposition were expected to be members of the Republican Party.

=== Support ===
Signs in favor of Proposition 50, seen at a No Kings Rally

The ballot measure was proposed by Governor Newsom, who emerged as its most vocal champion. Other prominent supporters include former President Barack Obama, former Vice President Kamala Harris, U.S. Senators Alex Padilla and Adam Schiff, and the California AFL-CIO. Newsom, Padilla, and former Speaker of the House Nancy Pelosi signed the ballot argument in favor.

Within a month after the special election was called, Newsom's political action committee (PAC) supporting the proposition raised $70 million, with $10 million coming from George Soros and his family. Representative Alexandria Ocasio-Cortez appeared in an ad produced by the PAC, speaking in support of the proposition and telling Californians that it "levels the playing field" and "gives power back to the people". The Newsom-led ballot committee announced on October 28 that it reached its fundraising goals and took the unusual step of stopping its fundraising activities. In the announcement, the committee noted that $38 million of the amount raised came from 1.2 million supporters.

A couple of other committees also spent money promoting the proposition. One, by the House Majority PAC, a Super PAC of House Democrats spent $10 million (as of Mid-October) and worked closely with Newsom's committee. The other committee, headed by liberal activist Tom Steyer, spent $12 million (as of mid-October) but did not coordinate with Newsom's committee. While some Democrats expressed chagrin over Steyer's efforts, others expressed the opinion that his work is "more likely to help than harm".

Combined spending to support the proposition was $138 million. The liberal think tank Center for American Progress, which is normally in favor of independent redistricting commissions, stated that redistricting commissions should be put on hold until Congress "establishes federal standards for redistricting that all states must abide by".

=== Opposition ===
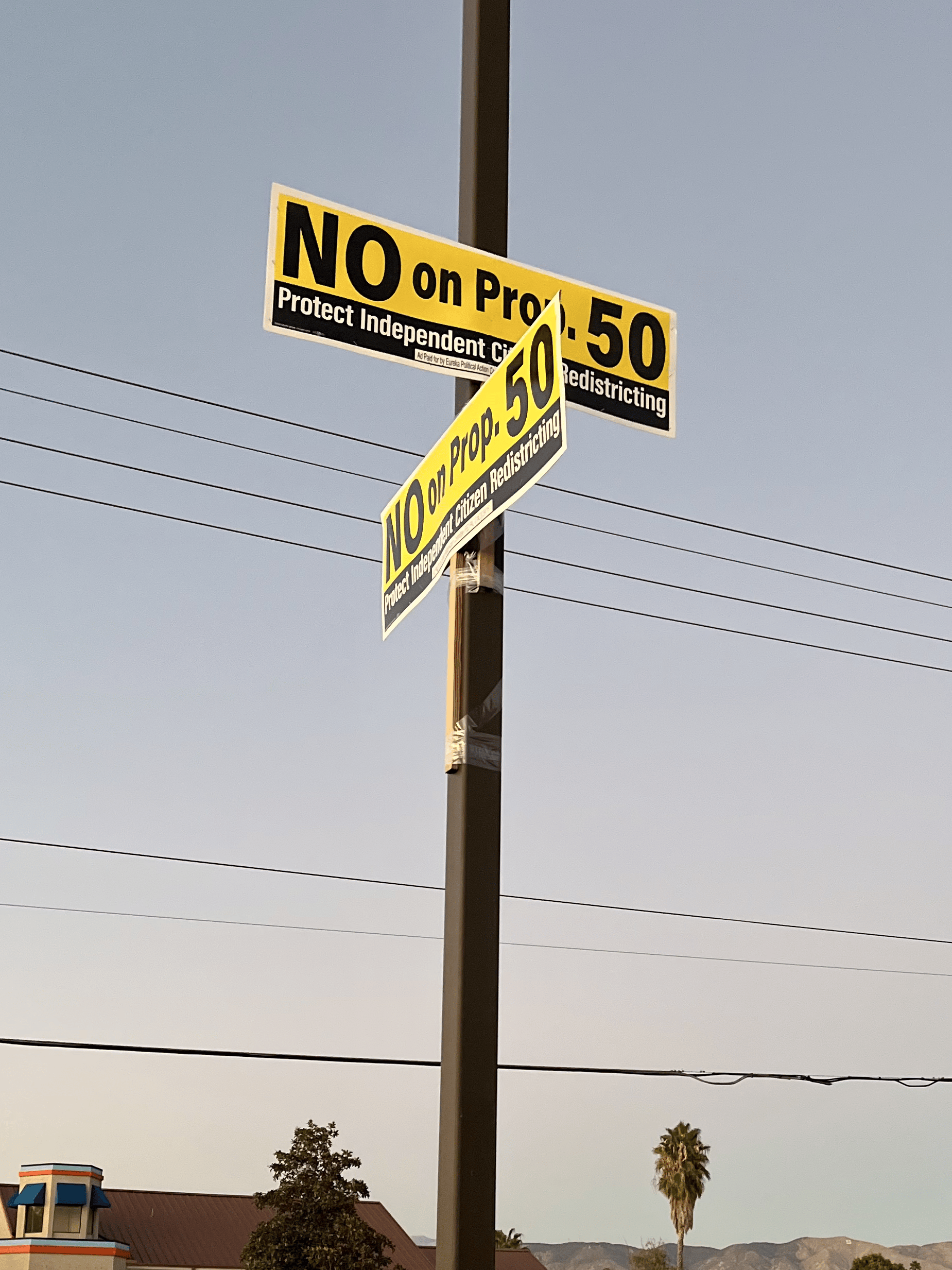
"No on Prop. 50" signs in Hemet, California

Two main committees were formed in opposition to the proposition: one named "Stop Sacramento's Power Grab", backed by former Speaker of the House Kevin McCarthy, and the other named "Protect Voters First", backed by Charles Munger Jr. Arnold Schwarzenegger, the state's most recent Republican to have served as governor, backed Munger Jr.'s efforts, but did not formally join the latter's campaign committee, and was later called "cowardly" by Republican officials for not being a more active opponent. McCarthy announced that he planned on raising $100 million for his committee, with immediate past chair of the California Republican Party, Jessica Millan Patterson, tapped to lead McCarthy's committee. However, as of two weeks prior to the election, McCarthy had only raised $11.4 million of that amount.

Both Schwarzenegger and Munger played a significant role in bringing about the California Citizens Redistricting Commission, with Munger having spent $12 million on the proposition to create the commission. Munger donated $10 million to start his committee, and ultimately contributed $32 million in opposition, although his committee ceased advertising weeks prior to the election. Both committees distanced themselves from Donald Trump, and Trump did not make any comments about the proposition prior to election day. Ultimately, $58 million was raised in opposition among both committees.

Democratic State Assembly member Jasmeet Bains, who is running against incumbent Republican Congressman David Valadao in 2026, also came out in opposition to the proposition.

=== Neutral ===
Common Cause issued a statement that it "will not pre-emptively oppose mid-decade redistricting in California". As a result, multiple advisory board members resigned.

The League of Women Voters of California, a leading proponent of Proposition 20 in 2010, had initially issued a statement opposing the redistricting, but changed its position to neutral after the State Legislature voted to put Proposition 50 on the ballot. The Charles Munger Jr.-formed committee used quotes from the original opposition in mailers that it sent out, without mentioning that the league had dropped its opposition.

== Endorsements ==
Yes

Executive branch officials

- Barack Obama, 44th President of the United States (2009–2017) (Democratic)
- Kamala Harris, 49th Vice President of the United States (2021–2025) (Democratic)
- Eric Holder, 82nd United States Attorney General (2009–2015) (Democratic)
- Xavier Becerra, 25th United States Secretary of Health and Human Services (2021–2025) (Democratic)
- Robert Reich, 22nd United States Secretary of Labor (1993–1997) (Democratic)

U.S. senators

- Cory Booker, New Jersey (2013–present) (Democratic)
- Alex Padilla, California (2021–present) (Democratic)
- Adam Schiff, California (2024–present) (Democratic)
- Elizabeth Warren, Massachusetts (2013–present) (Democratic)

U.S. representatives

- Pete Aguilar, CA-33 (2023–present), CA-23 (2013–2023), CA-22 (2007–2013) (Democratic)
- Sara Jacobs, CA-51 (2023–present), CA-53 (2021–2023) (Democratic)
- Hakeem Jeffries, House Minority Leader (2023–present), NY-8 (2013–present) (Democratic)
- Ted Lieu, CA-36 (2023–present), CA-33 (2015–2023) (Democratic)
- Zoe Lofgren, CA-18 (2023–present), CA-19 (2013–2023), CA-16 (1995–2013) (Democratic)
- Alexandria Ocasio-Cortez, NY-14 (2019–present) (Democratic)
- Nancy Pelosi, CA-11 (2023–present), CA-12 (2013–2023), CA-8 (1993–2013), CA-5 (1987–1993), Speaker of the United States House of Representatives (2007–2011, 2019–2023) (Democratic)
- Katie Porter, CA-47 (2023–2025), CA-45 (2019–2023) (Democratic)
- Scott Peters, CA-50 (2023–present), CA-52 (2013–2023) (Democratic)
- Mark Takano, CA-39 (2023–present), CA-41 (2013–2023) (Democratic)

Statewide officials

- Gray Davis, Governor of California (1999–2003) (Democratic)
- Gavin Newsom, Governor of California (2019–present) (Democratic)
- Rob Bonta, Attorney General of California (2021–present) (Democratic)
- Tony Thurmond, California State Superintendent of Public Instruction (2019-present) (Democratic)
- Betty Yee, California State Controller (2015–2023) (Democratic)

State senators

- Sabrina Cervantes, California's 31st district (Democratic)
- Monique Limón, California's 21st district (Democratic)
- Lola Smallwood-Cuevas, California's 28th district (Democratic)

State representatives

- Isaac Bryan, California's 55th district (Democratic)
- Lisa Calderon, California's 56th district (Democratic)
- Jessica Caloza, California's 52nd district (Democratic)
- Juan Carrillo, California's 39th district (Democratic)
- Nicole Collier, Texas's 95th district (Democratic)
- Sade Elhawary, California's 57th district (Democratic)
- Mike Fong, California's 49th district (Democratic)
- Mark González, California's 54th district (Democratic)
- John Harabedian, California's 41st district (Democratic)
- Ann Johnson, Texas's 134th district (Democratic)
- Tina McKinnor, California's 61st district (Democratic)
- Robert A. Rivas, Speaker of the California State Assembly (2023–present) (Democratic)
- Chris Rogers, California's 2nd district (Democratic)
- Nick Schultz, California's 44th district (Democratic)

National party officials

- Ken Martin, chair of the Democratic National Committee (2025–present) (Democratic)

Local officials

- Daniel Lurie, Mayor of San Francisco (2025–present) (Democratic)
- Antonio Villaraigosa, Mayor of Los Angeles (2005–2013) (Democratic)

Individuals

- Danny Bakewell, publisher of the Los Angeles Sentinel and civil rights activist
- Rick Caruso, developer (Democratic)
- Stephen J. Cloobeck, businessman (Democratic)
- Lorena Gonzalez, president of the California Labor Federation (2022–present) (Democratic)
- David Huerta, trade union leader
- Tom Steyer, businessman (Democratic)

Political parties

- California Democratic Party
- California Working Families Party

Labor unions

- California AFL-CIO
- AFSCME California
- National Union of Healthcare Workers
- United Farm Workers
- California Faculty Association
- California Teachers Association
- SEIU California State Council

Organizations

- Sierra Club, All 13 California Chapters
- Our Revolution
- 314 Action
- National Organization for Women California
- California Democratic Socialists of America
- Courage California
- Democratic National Committee
- National Association for the Advancement of Colored People
- National Democratic Redistricting Committee
- People for the American Way
- Planned Parenthood Affiliates of California
- Swing Left
- Vote Forward

Newspapers

- Santa Barbara Independent
- Santa Cruz Sentinel
- San Francisco Chronicle
- St. Helena Star
- The Press Democrat
- The Sacramento Bee

Government bodies

- Long Beach City Council
- Los Angeles City Council
- Marin County Board of Supervisors
- Monterey County Board of Supervisors
- Napa County Board of Supervisors
- Palo Alto City Council
- San Francisco Board of Supervisors
- San Mateo County Board of Supervisors
- Santa Ana City Council
- Santa Clara County Board of Supervisors
- Soledad City Council
- Sonoma County Board of Supervisors
- West Hollywood City Council
No

Executive branch officials

- Matt Schlapp, White House Director of Political Affairs (2003–2005) (Republican)

U.S. representatives

- Ken Calvert, CA-41 (2023–present), CA-42 (2013–2023), CA-44 (2003–2013), CA-43 (1993–2003) (Republican)
- Vince Fong, CA-20 (2024–present) (Republican)
- Darrell Issa, CA-48 (2023–present), CA-50 (2021–2023), CA-49 (2003–2019), CA-48 (2001–2003) (Republican)
- Mike Johnson, 56th Speaker of the United States House of Representatives (2023–present), LA-4 (2017–present) (Republican)
- Jim Jordan, OH-4 (2007–present) (Republican)
- Kevin Kiley, CA-3 (2023–present) (Republican)
- Young Kim, CA-40 (2023–present), CA-39 (2021–2023) (Republican)
- Doug LaMalfa, CA-1 (2013–2026) (Republican)
- Kevin McCarthy, 55th Speaker of the United States House of Representatives (2023), CA-20 (2023), CA-23 (2013–2023), CA-22 (2007–2013) (Republican)
- Tom McClintock, CA-5 (2023–present), CA-4 (2009–2023) (Republican)
- Jay Obernolte, CA-23 (2023–present), CA-8 (2021–2023) (Republican)
- Michelle Steel, CA-45 (2023–2025), CA-48 (2021–2023) Republican)
- David Valadao, CA-22 (2023–present), CA-21 (2021–2023) (Republican)

Statewide officials

- Arnold Schwarzenegger, 38th Governor of California (2003–2011) (Republican)

State senators

- Sam Blakeslee, California's 15th district (2010–2012) (Republican)
- Brian Dahle, California's 1st district (2019–2024) (Republican)
- Megan Dahle, California's 1st district (2024–present) (Republican)
- Tony Strickland, California's 36th district (2025–present) (Republican)
- Suzette Martinez Valladares, California's 23rd district (2024–present) (Republican)

State representatives

- Jasmeet Bains, California's 35th district (Democratic)
- Carl DeMaio, California's 75th district (Republican)
- James Gallagher, California's 3rd district (Republican)
- Jeff Gonzalez, California's 36th district (Republican)
- Tri Ta, California's 70th district (Republican)

Individuals

- Steve Hilton, political advisor (Republican)
- Charles Munger Jr., physicist (Republican)
- Thomas Siebel, businessman
- Shawn Steel, Republican National Committeeman from California
- James Woods, actor

Political parties

- California Republican Party
- Libertarian Party of California
- San Francisco Green Party

Local officials

- 37 of the 58 county sheriffs in California, including:
  - Don Barnes, Sheriff-Coroner of Orange County (2019–present)
  - Chad Bianco, Sheriff-Coroner of Riverside County (2019–present) (Republican)
- 30 of the 58 district attorneys in California, including:
  - Krishna Abrams, District Attorney of Solano County
  - Allison Haley, District Attorney of Napa County
  - Michael A. Hestrin, District Attorney of Riverside County
  - Nathan Hochman, District Attorney of Los Angeles County (Independent)
  - Michael A. Ramos, 35th District Attorney of San Bernardino County (Republican)
  - Jeff Reisig, District Attorney of Yolo County
  - Summer Stephan, 44th District Attorney of San Diego County (Independent)
- Kevin Faulconer, Mayor of San Diego (2014-2020) (Republican)
- Janet Nguyen, Member of the Orange County Board of Supervisors (Republican)

Local party officials

- Jesse Perez, member of the Merced County Democratic Central Committee (Democratic)

Organizations

- California Farm Bureau
- Congressional Leadership Fund
- ~~League of Women Voters of California~~ (switched to neutral)

Newspapers

- Chico Enterprise-Record
- Daily Breeze (Note: Editorial shared with 10 other papers with the same ownership group)
- Inland Valley Daily Bulletin
- Los Angeles Daily News
- Pasadena Star-News
- Press-Telegram
- Redlands Daily Facts
- San Gabriel Valley Tribune
- The San Bernardino Sun
- The Orange County Register
- Whittier Daily News
- The Press-Enterprise
- San Diego Union Tribune
- The Santa Clarita Valley Signal

Government bodies

- Brawley City Council
- Clovis City Council
- El Centro City Council
- Escondido City Council
- Huntington Beach City Council
- Kern County Board of Supervisors
- Lancaster City Council
- Lodi City Council
- Loomis Town Council
- Mission Viejo City Council
- Newport Beach City Council
- Orange City Council
- Orange County Board of Education
- San Clemente City Council
- Santa Clarita City Council
- Seal Beach City Council
- Shasta County Board of Supervisors
- Siskiyou County Board of Supervisors
- Temecula City Council
- Tulare County Board of Supervisors
- Westminster City Council
- Yorba Linda City Council
- Yuba County Board of Supervisors
Declined to endorse

Organizations

- California Chamber of Commerce
- Common Cause
- League of Women Voters of California (switched from opposed)

Political parties

- Peace and Freedom Party

Government bodies

- Calexico City Council
- Cypress City Council
- Fountain Valley City Council
- Irvine City Council
- Mendocino County Board of Supervisors
- Plumas County Board of Supervisors
- South Lake Tahoe City Council
- Stanton City Council
- Tuolumne County Board of Supervisors

== Polling ==
Poll source	Date(s) administered	Sample size (Note: Key: A – all adults RV – registered voters LV – likely voters V – unclear)	Margin of error	Phrasing	Support	Oppose	Unsure
Berkeley IGS	October 20–27, 2025	4,946 (LV)	± 2%	"The special election includes a statewide ballot measure about redistricting, Proposition 50. The following is a summary of Proposition 50 exactly as it appeared on the election ballot.... (How did)/(If you were voting today, how would) you vote on Proposition 50?"	60%	38%	2%
Berkeley IGS	October 20–27, 2025	8,141 (RV)	± 2%	"The special election includes a statewide ballot measure about redistricting, Proposition 50. The following is a summary of Proposition 50 exactly as it appeared on the election ballot.... (How did)/(If you were voting today, how would) you vote on Proposition 50?"	54%	33%	13%
Emerson College	October 20–21, 2025	900 (LV)	± 3.2%	"On November 4, 2025, there will be an election for Proposition 50, which Authorizes Temporary Changes to Congressional District Maps in Response to Texas' Partisan Redistricting. If the election for Proposition 50 were held today, would you vote yes (support) or no (oppose)?"	57%	37%	6%
Emerson College	October 20–21, 2025	900 (LV)	± 3.2%	"On November 4, 2025, there will be an election for Proposition 50, which Authorizes Temporary Changes to Congressional District Maps in Response to Texas' Partisan Redistricting. If the election for Proposition 50 were held today, would you vote yes (support) or no (oppose)?"	60% (Note: Undecided pushed)	40%	–
CBS News/YouGov	October 16–21, 2025	1,497 (LV)	± 3.6%	"If the election were held today, how would you vote on Proposition 50, which 'authorizes temporary changes to congressional district maps in response to Texas' partisan redistricting'?"	62%	38%	–
Public Policy Institute of California	October 7–14, 2025	943 (LV)	± 4.1%	"If the election were held today, would you vote yes or no on Proposition 50?"	56%	43%	1%
co/efficient (R)	September 29 – October 1, 2025	976 (LV)	± 3.1%	"Do you support or oppose California's constitutional amendment known as Proposition 50?"	54%	36%	10%
co/efficient (R)	September 29 – October 1, 2025	976 (LV)	± 3.1%	"Proposition 50 authorizes temporary changes to congressional district maps in response to Texas' partisan redistricting. This constitutional amendment requires temporary use of new congressional district maps through 2030, directs the independent Citizens Redistricting Commission to resume enacting congressional district maps in 2031, establishes policy supporting nonpartisan redistricting commissions nationwide; and has a one-time cost to counties of up to a few million dollars statewide. If the special election were held today, would you vote yes or no on Proposition 50?"	56%	39%	5%
Emerson College	September 15–16, 2025	1,000 (RV)	± 3.0%	"In November 2025, there will be an election for Proposition 50, which authorizes temporary changes to California's congressional district maps in response to Texas' partisan redistricting. If the election for Proposition 50 were held today, would you vote yes (support) or no (oppose)?"	51%	34%	15%
Harper Polling (R) (Note: Poll sponsored by the United States Justice Foundation)	August 25–27, 2025	600 (LV)	± 4.0%	Question phrasing not available, described as "testing the Proposition 50 language".	54%	29%	17%
Berkeley IGS	August 11–17, 2025	4,950 (RV)	± 1.5%	"Suppose a statewide ballot measure to change the way California Congressional District lines are drawn was put before voters in a special election later this year. The measure would ask voters to allow the state to temporarily replace the Congressional district lines drawn by the state's independent citizens commission after the last census in 2020 for use in next year's elections, if Texas goes forward with its own partisan mid-term redistricting plan. The measure would also return the authority to redraw California's Congressional district lines to the state's independent citizens commission for the next census in 2030. If you were voting today, would you vote YES or NO on this proposed ballot measure?"	48%	32%	20%
David Binder Research (D)	August 10–14, 2025	1,000 (LV)	± 3.0%	Question phrasing not available, described in Axios as: "Proposition 50 allows new maps to be designed on a temporary basis, triggered by partisan action in other states such as Texas, and retains the independent redistricting commission".	57%	35%	8%
Citrin Center/Possibility Lab/Politico	July 28 – August 12, 2025	1,445 (RV)	± 2.6%	"In both 2008 and 2010, California voters passed initiatives to give an Independent Citizens Redistricting Commission the power to draw the state's legislative and congressional districts, in order to reduce the influence of politicians. Governor Newsom has suggested returning congressional line drawing authority back to the Legislature, citing concerns that redistricting efforts in Republican states would give them a partisan advantage."	36% (Note: Phrased as "support returning congressional redistricting authority to state legislators")	64% (Note: Phrased as "support keeping the independent redistricting commission")	–
Emerson College	August 4–5, 2025	1,000 (RV)	± 3.0%	"Do you support or oppose the proposal to redraw California's congressional map ahead of the 2026 Midterm Elections?"	33%	25%	42%

== Results ==
2025 California Proposition 50
Choice	Votes	%
For	7,453,339	64.42
Against	4,116,998	35.58
Total	11,570,337	100.00
Valid votes	11,570,337	99.88
Invalid/blank votes	14,056	0.12
Total votes	11,584,393	100.00
Registered voters/turnout	23,093,274	50.16

Proposition 50 results (excluding invalid votes)
Yes; 7,453,339 (64.4%)	No; 4,116,998 (35.6%)
▲50%

=== By county ===
County	Yes		No		Ballots cast (Note: including invalid ballots)	Turnout
County	#	%	#	%	Ballots cast	Turnout
Alameda	409,301	80.6%	98,653	19.4%	508,730	52.6%
Alpine	368	64.4%	203	35.6%	571	61.2%
Amador	6,239	34.1%	12,077	65.9%	18,334	68.0%
Butte	34,288	45.9%	40,369	54.1%	74,721	58.4%
Calaveras	7,223	34.2%	13,885	65.8%	21,118	63.1%
Colusa	2,098	36.4%	3,665	63.6%	5,778	52.6%
Contra Costa	294,137	71.2%	118,701	28.8%	413,212	56.6%
Del Norte	3,277	41.1%	4,702	58.9%	7,989	51.2%
El Dorado	37,844	41.7%	52,995	58.3%	90,941	65.6%
Fresno	121,356	52.2%	111,045	47.8%	232,723	43.8%
Glenn	2,494	30.2%	5,769	69.8%	8,271	58.6%
Humboldt	30,415	64.0%	17,093	36.0%	47,540	54.9%
Imperial	20,154	59.7%	13,584	40.3%	33,797	36.0%
Inyo	3,350	48.1%	3,618	51.9%	6,975	64.6%
Kern	83,371	44.9%	102,458	55.1%	186,019	39.9%
Kings	12,265	41.9%	16,981	58.1%	29,270	50.1%
Lake	10,350	49.9%	10,399	50.1%	20,763	53.7%
Lassen	1,748	19.6%	7,185	80.4%	8,934	58.8%
Los Angeles	1,950,068	74.3%	673,059	25.7%	2,625,510	44.9%
Madera	17,706	43.6%	22,922	56.4%	40,656	49.5%
Marin	95,495	80.7%	22,869	19.3%	118,495	68.1%
Mariposa	2,962	38.4%	4,746	61.6%	7,708	64.0%
Mendocino	19,661	63.6%	11,279	36.4%	30,981	57.5%
Merced	31,239	54.0%	26,630	46.0%	57,971	42.5%
Modoc	711	22.2%	2,487	77.8%	3,198	59.8%
Mono	2,677	58.7%	1,885	41.3%	4,565	56.8%
Monterey	74,314	68.5%	34,129	31.5%	108,532	49.6%
Napa	35,682	68.1%	16,692	31.9%	52,409	60.7%
Nevada	28,087	54.4%	23,573	45.6%	51,723	66.3%
Orange	554,430	55.5%	444,963	44.5%	999,918	52.3%
Placer	82,910	44.3%	104,281	55.7%	187,336	63.0%
Plumas	3,212	38.0%	5,243	62.0%	8,478	61.9%
Riverside	369,565	56.3%	286,995	43.7%	657,322	45.9%
Sacramento	312,104	62.0%	191,121	38.0%	503,687	55.0%
San Benito	12,334	60.4%	8,085	39.6%	20,432	51.7%
San Bernardino	311,748	57.4%	231,495	42.6%	543,724	44.2%
San Diego	646,358	61.2%	409,781	38.8%	1,056,873	52.3%
San Francisco	251,058	85.3%	43,288	14.7%	295,232	55.5%
San Joaquin	101,892	54.1%	86,419	45.9%	188,443	46.7%
San Luis Obispo	66,297	54.7%	54,891	45.3%	121,305	66.4%
San Mateo	186,934	76.0%	58,885	24.0%	246,003	55.1%
Santa Barbara	89,680	65.0%	48,297	35.0%	138,104	55.1%
Santa Clara	393,625	71.5%	156,690	28.5%	553,637	51.8%
Santa Cruz	82,508	77.8%	23,558	22.2%	106,244	61.3%
Shasta	19,138	29.1%	46,691	70.9%	65,917	56.5%
Sierra	522	35.3%	957	64.7%	1,480	67.9%
Siskiyou	6,218	37.4%	10,386	62.6%	16,612	59.1%
Solano	92,370	63.7%	52,714	36.3%	145,294	52.6%
Sonoma	153,840	73.5%	55,393	26.5%	209,450	65.3%
Stanislaus	68,076	49.3%	70,008	50.7%	138,208	46.1%
Sutter	11,284	37.9%	18,525	62.1%	29,853	53.7%
Tehama	5,379	26.3%	15,039	73.7%	20,441	54.3%
Trinity	1,840	40.6%	2,688	59.4%	4,528	60.5%
Tulare	43,503	44.9%	53,408	55.1%	96,993	43.1%
Tuolumne	8,807	38.2%	14,219	61.8%	23,040	63.2%
Ventura	178,305	61.3%	112,439	38.7%	290,920	55.3%
Yolo	51,560	69.5%	22,575	30.5%	74,184	60.2%
Yuba	8,962	38.5%	14,311	61.5%	23,301	50.5%
Totals	7,453,339	64.4%	4,116,998	35.6%	11,584,393	50.2%

=== By city ===
Of the 540 cities listed below, the "Yes" side won in 404 of them (75%), and "No" side won the remaining 136 (25%)

Official outcome by city and unincorporated areas of counties
City	County	Yes		No		Margin		Total Votes	Swing from 2024 Presidential (Harris to "Yes")%
City	County	#	%	#	%	#	%	Total Votes	Swing from 2024 Presidential (Harris to "Yes")%
Alameda	Alameda	27,148	83.88%	5,216	16.12%	21,932	67.77%	32,364	4.10%
Albany	Alameda	7,357	90.92%	735	9.08%	6,622	81.83%	8,092	3.47%
Berkeley	Alameda	45,457	94.15%	2,827	5.85%	42,630	88.29%	48,284	3.65%
Dublin	Alameda	13,224	72.37%	5,049	27.63%	8,175	44.74%	18,273	8.95%
Emeryville	Alameda	3,794	92.33%	315	7.67%	3,479	84.67%	4,109	8.59%
Fremont	Alameda	40,886	70.72%	16,930	29.28%	23,956	41.43%	57,816	7.39%
Hayward	Alameda	27,991	77.75%	8,010	22.25%	19,981	55.50%	36,001	13.32%
Livermore	Alameda	21,200	62.70%	12,610	37.30%	8,590	25.41%	33,810	0.67%
Newark	Alameda	8,840	72.63%	3,332	27.37%	5,508	45.25%	12,172	10.15%
Oakland	Alameda	123,333	91.99%	10,742	8.01%	112,591	83.98%	134,075	7.77%
Piedmont	Alameda	5,169	84.20%	970	15.80%	4,199	68.40%	6,139	-6.39%
Pleasanton	Alameda	18,814	67.67%	8,988	32.33%	9,826	35.34%	27,802	0.65%
San Leandro	Alameda	19,482	78.15%	5,446	21.85%	14,036	56.31%	24,928	10.80%
Union City	Alameda	14,369	74.74%	4,856	25.26%	9,513	49.48%	19,225	12.55%
Unincorporated Area	Alameda	32,237	71.85%	12,627	28.15%	19,610	43.71%	44,864	6.40%
Unincorporated Area	Alpine	368	64.45%	203	35.55%	165	28.90%	571	-3.08%
Amador	Amador	74	63.25%	43	36.75%	31	26.50%	117	-5.39%
Ione	Amador	681	28.16%	1,737	71.84%	-1,056	-43.67%	2,418	-3.09%
Jackson	Amador	876	40.92%	1,265	59.08%	-389	-18.17%	2,141	-3.46%
Plymouth	Amador	187	33.39%	373	66.61%	-186	-33.21%	560	-6.09%
Sutter Creek	Amador	560	43.72%	721	56.28%	-161	-12.57%	1,281	-4.05%
Unincorporated Area	Amador	3,861	32.72%	7,938	67.28%	-4,077	-34.55%	11,799	-4.36%
Biggs	Butte	183	33.21%	368	66.79%	-185	-33.58%	551	4.34%
Chico	Butte	20,960	60.46%	13,710	39.54%	7,250	20.91%	34,670	-2.63%
Gridley	Butte	853	45.37%	1,027	54.63%	-174	-9.26%	1,880	6.18%
Oroville	Butte	1,792	38.12%	2,909	61.88%	-1,117	-23.76%	4,701	-0.42%
Paradise	Butte	1,720	33.75%	3,377	66.25%	-1,657	-32.51%	5,097	-6.45%
Unincorporated Area	Butte	8,780	31.63%	18,978	68.37%	-10,198	-36.74%	27,758	-7.88%
Angels	Calaveras	595	37.23%	1,003	62.77%	-408	-25.53%	1,598	-4.04%
Unincorporated Area	Calaveras	6,628	33.97%	12,882	66.03%	-6,254	-32.06%	19,510	-3.38%
Colusa	Colusa	631	34.98%	1,173	65.02%	-542	-30.04%	1,804	-2.97%
Williams	Colusa	551	61.56%	344	38.44%	207	23.13%	895	20.90%
Unincorporated Area	Colusa	916	29.90%	2,148	70.10%	-1,232	-40.21%	3,064	-1.40%
Antioch	Contra Costa	22,809	71.98%	8,878	28.02%	13,931	43.96%	31,687	11.94%
Brentwood	Contra Costa	14,515	58.83%	10,158	41.17%	4,357	17.66%	24,673	5.22%
Clayton	Contra Costa	3,276	57.26%	2,445	42.74%	831	14.53%	5,721	-3.70%
Concord	Contra Costa	29,181	69.76%	12,651	30.24%	16,530	39.52%	41,832	4.30%
Danville	Contra Costa	12,703	60.40%	8,329	39.60%	4,374	20.80%	21,032	-5.94%
El Cerrito	Contra Costa	10,849	89.19%	1,315	10.81%	9,534	78.38%	12,164	2.87%
Hercules	Contra Costa	7,720	78.56%	2,107	21.44%	5,613	57.12%	9,827	7.45%
Lafayette	Contra Costa	9,684	74.29%	3,351	25.71%	6,333	48.58%	13,035	-6.53%
Martinez	Contra Costa	11,662	69.35%	5,154	30.65%	6,508	38.70%	16,816	2.06%
Moraga	Contra Costa	5,630	72.31%	2,156	27.69%	3,474	44.62%	7,786	-8.70%
Oakley	Contra Costa	8,336	58.67%	5,873	41.33%	2,463	17.33%	14,209	10.34%
Orinda	Contra Costa	7,747	76.02%	2,444	23.98%	5,303	52.04%	10,191	-5.73%
Pinole	Contra Costa	5,513	76.26%	1,716	23.74%	3,797	52.52%	7,229	7.98%
Pittsburg	Contra Costa	14,595	76.96%	4,369	23.04%	10,226	53.92%	18,964	15.05%
Pleasant Hill	Contra Costa	11,013	72.65%	4,145	27.35%	6,868	45.31%	15,158	0.07%
Richmond	Contra Costa	26,862	87.66%	3,782	12.34%	23,080	75.32%	30,644	11.76%
San Pablo	Contra Costa	4,877	85.10%	854	14.90%	4,023	70.20%	5,731	19.05%
San Ramon	Contra Costa	19,307	68.97%	8,688	31.03%	10,619	37.93%	27,995	4.23%
Walnut Creek	Contra Costa	24,593	74.62%	8,365	25.38%	16,228	49.24%	32,958	-0.89%
Unincorporated Area	Contra Costa	43,265	66.37%	21,921	33.63%	21,344	32.74%	65,186	3.03%
Crescent City	Del Norte	481	52.28%	439	47.72%	42	4.57%	920	5.83%
Unincorporated Area	Del Norte	2,796	39.61%	4,263	60.39%	-1,467	-20.78%	7,059	-2.32%
Placerville	El Dorado	2,076	49.75%	2,097	50.25%	-21	-0.50%	4,173	-2.40%
South Lake Tahoe	El Dorado	3,957	65.64%	2,071	34.36%	1,886	31.29%	6,028	4.28%
Unincorporated Area	El Dorado	31,811	39.45%	48,827	60.55%	-17,016	-21.10%	80,638	-4.80%
Clovis	Fresno	16,562	41.09%	23,740	58.91%	-7,178	-17.81%	40,302	2.61%
Coalinga	Fresno	1,173	46.71%	1,338	53.29%	-165	-6.57%	2,511	11.07%
Firebaugh	Fresno	803	71.06%	327	28.94%	476	42.12%	1,130	29.75%
Fowler	Fresno	1,120	57.55%	826	42.45%	294	15.11%	1,946	25.40%
Fresno	Fresno	68,446	59.96%	45,701	40.04%	22,745	19.93%	114,147	11.71%
Huron	Fresno	319	83.07%	65	16.93%	254	66.15%	384	30.71%
Kerman	Fresno	1,812	60.10%	1,203	39.90%	609	20.20%	3,015	26.02%
Kingsburg	Fresno	1,341	30.97%	2,989	69.03%	-1,648	-38.06%	4,330	-0.43%
Mendota	Fresno	727	79.98%	182	20.02%	545	59.96%	909	46.73%
Orange Cove	Fresno	703	75.51%	228	24.49%	475	51.02%	931	35.62%
Parlier	Fresno	1,223	79.83%	309	20.17%	914	59.66%	1,532	32.65%
Reedley	Fresno	2,713	54.17%	2,295	45.83%	418	8.35%	5,008	14.27%
San Joaquin	Fresno	347	90.60%	36	9.40%	311	81.20%	383	35.53%
Sanger	Fresno	3,387	62.28%	2,051	37.72%	1,336	24.57%	5,438	17.85%
Selma	Fresno	2,689	60.01%	1,792	39.99%	897	20.02%	4,481	19.46%
Unincorporated Area	Fresno	17,991	39.15%	27,963	60.85%	-9,972	-21.70%	45,954	2.59%
Orland	Glenn	856	42.02%	1,181	57.98%	-325	-15.95%	2,037	0.12%
Willows	Glenn	545	32.34%	1,140	67.66%	-595	-35.31%	1,685	-5.80%
Unincorporated Area	Glenn	1,093	24.07%	3,448	75.93%	-2,355	-51.86%	4,541	-6.08%
Arcata	Humboldt	5,398	85.42%	921	14.58%	4,477	70.85%	6,319	3.46%
Blue Lake	Humboldt	384	74.56%	131	25.44%	253	49.13%	515	0.89%
Eureka	Humboldt	6,008	70.59%	2,503	29.41%	3,505	41.18%	8,511	1.95%
Ferndale	Humboldt	354	51.91%	328	48.09%	26	3.81%	682	-4.14%
Fortuna	Humboldt	1,795	44.34%	2,253	55.66%	-458	-11.31%	4,048	-3.96%
Rio Dell	Humboldt	319	35.21%	587	64.79%	-268	-29.58%	906	-5.65%
Trinidad	Humboldt	127	78.40%	35	21.60%	92	56.79%	162	4.39%
Unincorporated Area	Humboldt	16,030	60.80%	10,335	39.20%	5,695	21.60%	26,365	-1.04%
Brawley	Imperial	2,981	57.26%	2,225	42.74%	756	14.52%	5,206	19.12%
Calexico	Imperial	5,031	75.28%	1,652	24.72%	3,379	50.56%	6,683	33.22%
Calipatria	Imperial	344	59.41%	235	40.59%	109	18.83%	579	21.28%
El Centro	Imperial	5,622	61.67%	3,495	38.33%	2,127	23.33%	9,117	20.35%
Holtville	Imperial	626	53.69%	540	46.31%	86	7.38%	1,166	12.02%
Imperial	Imperial	2,510	51.12%	2,400	48.88%	110	2.24%	4,910	19.24%
Westmorland	Imperial	199	66.33%	101	33.67%	98	32.67%	300	17.72%
Unincorporated Area	Imperial	2,841	49.18%	2,936	50.82%	-95	-1.64%	5,777	12.36%
Bishop	Inyo	757	60.80%	488	39.20%	269	21.61%	1,245	6.81%
Unincorporated Area	Inyo	2,593	45.31%	3,130	54.69%	-537	-9.38%	5,723	-2.41%
Arvin	Kern	1,362	79.14%	359	20.86%	1,003	58.28%	1,721	38.69%
Bakersfield	Kern	43,081	48.72%	45,336	51.28%	-2,255	-2.55%	88,417	12.88%
California City	Kern	1,508	52.04%	1,390	47.96%	118	4.07%	2,898	10.97%
Delano	Kern	3,931	69.37%	1,736	30.63%	2,195	38.73%	5,667	30.05%
Maricopa	Kern	46	20.26%	181	79.74%	-135	-59.47%	227	8.49%
McFarland	Kern	1,054	69.57%	461	30.43%	593	39.14%	1,515	30.30%
Ridgecrest	Kern	3,246	39.64%	4,942	60.36%	-1,696	-20.71%	8,188	3.98%
Shafter	Kern	1,893	51.48%	1,784	48.52%	109	2.96%	3,677	26.64%
Taft	Kern	273	18.72%	1,185	81.28%	-912	-62.55%	1,458	0.80%
Tehachapi	Kern	992	36.11%	1,755	63.89%	-763	-27.78%	2,747	4.18%
Wasco	Kern	1,600	60.61%	1,040	39.39%	560	21.21%	2,640	26.62%
Unincorporated Area	Kern	24,385	36.57%	42,289	63.43%	-17,904	-26.85%	66,674	6.07%
Avenal	Kings	538	62.78%	319	37.22%	219	25.55%	857	26.60%
Corcoran	Kings	1,090	59.01%	757	40.99%	333	18.03%	1,847	20.28%
Hanford	Kings	6,337	42.71%	8,501	57.29%	-2,164	-14.58%	14,838	6.48%
Lemoore	Kings	2,473	41.87%	3,433	58.13%	-960	-16.25%	5,906	6.73%
Unincorporated Area	Kings	1,827	31.51%	3,971	68.49%	-2,144	-36.98%	5,798	2.32%
Clearlake	Lake	1,680	55.01%	1,374	44.99%	306	10.02%	3,054	8.46%
Lakeport	Lake	958	52.01%	884	47.99%	74	4.02%	1,842	-0.89%
Unincorporated Area	Lake	7,712	48.65%	8,141	51.35%	-429	-2.71%	15,853	0.01%
Susanville	Lassen	711	25.40%	2,088	74.60%	-1,377	-49.20%	2,799	-3.60%
Unincorporated Area	Lassen	1,037	16.91%	5,097	83.09%	-4,060	-66.19%	6,134	-7.99%
Agoura Hills	Los Angeles	5,819	62.64%	3,471	37.36%	2,348	25.27%	9,290	2.52%
Alhambra	Los Angeles	15,716	74.90%	5,266	25.10%	10,450	49.80%	20,982	18.26%
Arcadia	Los Angeles	8,622	58.31%	6,165	41.69%	2,457	16.62%	14,787	5.79%
Artesia	Los Angeles	2,498	67.64%	1,195	32.36%	1,303	35.28%	3,693	24.60%
Avalon	Los Angeles	495	59.42%	338	40.58%	157	18.85%	833	5.13%
Azusa	Los Angeles	7,741	70.67%	3,212	29.33%	4,529	41.35%	10,953	20.11%
Baldwin Park	Los Angeles	10,965	80.28%	2,694	19.72%	8,271	60.55%	13,659	31.95%
Bell	Los Angeles	4,938	86.46%	773	13.54%	4,165	72.93%	5,711	41.03%
Bell Gardens	Los Angeles	5,207	88.48%	678	11.52%	4,529	76.96%	5,885	42.64%
Bellflower	Los Angeles	12,613	72.46%	4,794	27.54%	7,819	44.92%	17,407	23.29%
Beverly Hills	Los Angeles	5,613	51.15%	5,361	48.85%	252	2.30%	10,974	7.14%
Bradbury	Los Angeles	154	47.98%	167	52.02%	-13	-4.05%	321	-0.45%
Burbank	Los Angeles	27,188	72.89%	10,113	27.11%	17,075	45.78%	37,301	11.92%
Calabasas	Los Angeles	5,481	61.49%	3,432	38.51%	2,049	22.99%	8,913	4.95%
Carson	Los Angeles	22,414	80.29%	5,503	19.71%	16,911	60.58%	27,917	18.61%
Cerritos	Los Angeles	10,844	64.59%	5,946	35.41%	4,898	29.17%	16,790	10.77%
Claremont	Los Angeles	10,138	70.58%	4,226	29.42%	5,912	41.16%	14,364	5.07%
Commerce	Los Angeles	2,596	85.31%	447	14.69%	2,149	70.62%	3,043	35.32%
Compton	Los Angeles	16,125	91.47%	1,504	8.53%	14,621	82.94%	17,629	27.27%
Covina	Los Angeles	9,713	65.13%	5,201	34.87%	4,512	30.25%	14,914	17.53%
Cudahy	Los Angeles	2,740	87.62%	387	12.38%	2,353	75.25%	3,127	39.11%
Culver City	Los Angeles	14,441	84.17%	2,716	15.83%	11,725	68.34%	17,157	3.70%
Diamond Bar	Los Angeles	9,326	58.69%	6,564	41.31%	2,762	17.38%	15,890	10.06%
Downey	Los Angeles	20,901	71.72%	8,243	28.28%	12,658	43.43%	29,144	27.15%
Duarte	Los Angeles	5,028	69.95%	2,160	30.05%	2,868	39.90%	7,188	14.27%
El Monte	Los Angeles	12,506	77.07%	3,720	22.93%	8,786	54.15%	16,226	30.46%
El Segundo	Los Angeles	4,658	64.96%	2,513	35.04%	2,145	29.91%	7,171	-0.48%
Gardena	Los Angeles	12,729	79.71%	3,241	20.29%	9,488	59.41%	15,970	16.53%
Glendale	Los Angeles	32,147	67.29%	15,627	32.71%	16,520	34.58%	47,774	22.16%
Glendora	Los Angeles	9,778	50.18%	9,708	49.82%	70	0.36%	19,486	5.82%
Hawaiian Gardens	Los Angeles	1,944	78.32%	538	21.68%	1,406	56.65%	2,482	30.11%
Hawthorne	Los Angeles	14,933	82.66%	3,132	17.34%	11,801	65.33%	18,065	19.87%
Hermosa Beach	Los Angeles	5,458	67.63%	2,612	32.37%	2,846	35.27%	8,070	-1.99%
Hidden Hills	Los Angeles	379	53.23%	333	46.77%	46	6.46%	712	-3.23%
Huntington Park	Los Angeles	7,444	87.76%	1,038	12.24%	6,406	75.52%	8,482	36.46%
Industry	Los Angeles	19	43.18%	25	56.82%	-6	-13.64%	44	-6.49%
Inglewood	Los Angeles	26,131	91.93%	2,293	8.07%	23,838	83.87%	28,424	16.06%
Irwindale	Los Angeles	353	76.24%	110	23.76%	243	52.48%	463	28.54%
La Canada Flintridge	Los Angeles	5,276	59.00%	3,666	41.00%	1,610	18.00%	8,942	-4.05%
La Habra Heights	Los Angeles	1,005	43.58%	1,301	56.42%	-296	-12.84%	2,306	3.02%
La Mirada	Los Angeles	8,911	56.28%	6,921	43.72%	1,990	12.57%	15,832	11.37%
La Puente	Los Angeles	6,215	80.45%	1,510	19.55%	4,705	60.91%	7,725	32.62%
La Verne	Los Angeles	6,745	52.36%	6,136	47.64%	609	4.73%	12,881	7.00%
Lakewood	Los Angeles	17,983	63.27%	10,440	36.73%	7,543	26.54%	28,423	10.52%
Lancaster	Los Angeles	23,336	62.90%	13,767	37.10%	9,569	25.79%	37,103	17.28%
Lawndale	Los Angeles	5,120	78.40%	1,411	21.60%	3,709	56.79%	6,531	26.30%
Lomita	Los Angeles	3,903	61.94%	2,398	38.06%	1,505	23.89%	6,301	12.62%
Long Beach	Los Angeles	98,004	76.13%	30,732	23.87%	67,272	52.26%	128,736	12.06%
Los Angeles	Los Angeles	775,426	80.24%	190,927	19.76%	584,499	60.49%	966,353	16.90%
Lynwood	Los Angeles	10,223	89.12%	1,248	10.88%	8,975	78.24%	11,471	37.00%
Malibu	Los Angeles	2,431	61.94%	1,494	38.06%	937	23.87%	3,925	-3.88%
Manhattan Beach	Los Angeles	9,896	62.70%	5,888	37.30%	4,008	25.39%	15,784	-5.89%
Maywood	Los Angeles	3,685	90.01%	409	9.99%	3,276	80.02%	4,094	41.22%
Monrovia	Los Angeles	9,159	68.27%	4,256	31.73%	4,903	36.55%	13,415	7.15%
Montebello	Los Angeles	11,865	78.89%	3,175	21.11%	8,690	57.78%	15,040	25.25%
Monterey Park	Los Angeles	9,955	71.24%	4,019	28.76%	5,936	42.48%	13,974	18.18%
Norwalk	Los Angeles	18,770	75.76%	6,005	24.24%	12,765	51.52%	24,775	27.82%
Palmdale	Los Angeles	24,980	68.19%	11,653	31.81%	13,327	36.38%	36,633	22.38%
Palos Verdes Estates	Los Angeles	3,360	51.65%	3,145	48.35%	215	3.31%	6,505	-7.94%
Paramount	Los Angeles	7,904	85.47%	1,344	14.53%	6,560	70.93%	9,248	34.51%
Pasadena	Los Angeles	40,457	79.90%	10,178	20.10%	30,279	59.80%	50,635	7.01%
Pico Rivera	Los Angeles	13,423	79.95%	3,366	20.05%	10,057	59.90%	16,789	27.13%
Pomona	Los Angeles	22,455	75.28%	7,375	24.72%	15,080	50.55%	29,830	25.71%
Rancho Palos Verdes	Los Angeles	9,866	56.39%	7,629	43.61%	2,237	12.79%	17,495	-1.02%
Redondo Beach	Los Angeles	18,827	67.80%	8,943	32.20%	9,884	35.59%	27,770	1.55%
Rolling Hills	Los Angeles	332	37.86%	545	62.14%	-213	-24.29%	877	-9.43%
Rolling Hills Estates	Los Angeles	1,929	51.49%	1,817	48.51%	112	2.99%	3,746	-4.99%
Rosemead	Los Angeles	6,186	72.60%	2,335	27.40%	3,851	45.19%	8,521	26.96%
San Dimas	Los Angeles	6,588	52.37%	5,992	47.63%	596	4.74%	12,580	8.35%
San Fernando	Los Angeles	4,490	83.13%	911	16.87%	3,579	66.27%	5,401	32.31%
San Gabriel	Los Angeles	5,945	69.75%	2,578	30.25%	3,367	39.50%	8,523	18.05%
San Marino	Los Angeles	2,591	55.07%	2,114	44.93%	477	10.14%	4,705	-5.16%
Santa Clarita	Los Angeles	44,193	55.01%	36,144	44.99%	8,049	10.02%	80,337	7.27%
Santa Fe Springs	Los Angeles	3,848	73.31%	1,401	26.69%	2,447	46.62%	5,249	23.96%
Santa Monica	Los Angeles	30,239	81.85%	6,704	18.15%	23,535	63.71%	36,943	3.44%
Sierra Madre	Los Angeles	3,908	68.55%	1,793	31.45%	2,115	37.10%	5,701	0.61%
Signal Hill	Los Angeles	2,807	76.74%	851	23.26%	1,956	53.47%	3,658	11.82%
South El Monte	Los Angeles	2,758	79.46%	713	20.54%	2,045	58.92%	3,471	33.39%
South Gate	Los Angeles	15,374	85.98%	2,506	14.02%	12,868	71.97%	17,880	36.57%
South Pasadena	Los Angeles	8,882	80.43%	2,161	19.57%	6,721	60.86%	11,043	2.78%
Temple City	Los Angeles	5,531	60.27%	3,646	39.73%	1,885	20.54%	9,177	12.23%
Torrance	Los Angeles	30,695	60.93%	19,680	39.07%	11,015	21.87%	50,375	3.94%
Vernon	Los Angeles	41	83.67%	8	16.33%	33	67.35%	49	36.58%
Walnut	Los Angeles	5,373	60.47%	3,513	39.53%	1,860	20.93%	8,886	9.11%
West Covina	Los Angeles	19,737	68.67%	9,003	31.33%	10,734	37.35%	28,740	19.71%
West Hollywood	Los Angeles	12,475	86.82%	1,894	13.18%	10,581	73.64%	14,369	9.36%
Westlake Village	Los Angeles	2,250	56.68%	1,720	43.32%	530	13.35%	3,970	-1.13%
Whittier	Los Angeles	19,247	66.97%	9,494	33.03%	9,753	33.93%	28,741	17.03%
Unincorporated Area	Los Angeles	179,674	71.75%	70,754	28.25%	108,920	43.49%	250,428	17.39%
Chowchilla	Madera	1,221	40.38%	1,803	59.62%	-582	-19.25%	3,024	9.38%
Madera	Madera	6,709	60.62%	4,359	39.38%	2,350	21.23%	11,068	22.85%
Unincorporated Area	Madera	9,776	36.84%	16,760	63.16%	-6,984	-26.32%	26,536	2.41%
Belvedere	Marin	684	66.80%	340	33.20%	344	33.59%	1,024	-16.29%
Corte Madera	Marin	4,125	83.08%	840	16.92%	3,285	66.16%	4,965	-2.34%
Fairfax	Marin	3,896	86.60%	603	13.40%	3,293	73.19%	4,499	-4.19%
Larkspur	Marin	5,173	82.62%	1,088	17.38%	4,085	65.25%	6,261	-1.68%
Mill Valley	Marin	6,396	87.34%	927	12.66%	5,469	74.68%	7,323	-4.13%
Novato	Marin	17,468	74.57%	5,957	25.43%	11,511	49.14%	23,425	-0.53%
Ross	Marin	794	71.08%	323	28.92%	471	42.17%	1,117	-16.75%
San Anselmo	Marin	6,039	86.68%	928	13.32%	5,111	73.36%	6,967	-2.64%
San Rafael	Marin	18,316	82.05%	4,008	17.95%	14,308	64.09%	22,324	-0.44%
Sausalito	Marin	3,178	81.15%	738	18.85%	2,440	62.31%	3,916	-6.65%
Tiburon	Marin	3,205	74.85%	1,077	25.15%	2,128	49.70%	4,282	-8.11%
Unincorporated Area	Marin	26,221	81.28%	6,040	18.72%	20,181	62.56%	32,261	-2.95%
Unincorporated Area	Mariposa	2,962	38.43%	4,746	61.57%	-1,784	-23.14%	7,708	-2.08%
Fort Bragg	Mendocino	1,667	72.07%	646	27.93%	1,021	44.14%	2,313	1.60%
Point Arena	Mendocino	118	81.38%	27	18.62%	91	62.76%	145	3.35%
Ukiah	Mendocino	3,085	64.07%	1,730	35.93%	1,355	28.14%	4,815	3.18%
Willits	Mendocino	971	63.26%	564	36.74%	407	26.51%	1,535	5.92%
Unincorporated Area	Mendocino	13,820	62.44%	8,312	37.56%	5,508	24.89%	22,132	-0.92%
Atwater	Merced	3,435	51.65%	3,215	48.35%	220	3.31%	6,650	12.42%
Dos Palos	Merced	542	55.70%	431	44.30%	111	11.41%	973	18.95%
Gustine	Merced	566	47.68%	621	52.32%	-55	-4.63%	1,187	6.90%
Livingston	Merced	1,609	73.84%	570	26.16%	1,039	47.68%	2,179	41.03%
Los Banos	Merced	5,621	62.38%	3,390	37.62%	2,231	24.76%	9,011	17.95%
Merced	Merced	11,639	61.13%	7,400	38.87%	4,239	22.26%	19,039	11.98%
Unincorporated Area	Merced	7,827	41.57%	11,003	58.43%	-3,176	-16.87%	18,830	6.23%
Alturas	Modoc	210	25.09%	627	74.91%	-417	-49.82%	837	-7.00%
Unincorporated Area	Modoc	501	21.22%	1,860	78.78%	-1,359	-57.56%	2,361	-9.35%
Mammoth Lakes	Mono	1,472	67.52%	708	32.48%	764	35.05%	2,180	-0.72%
Unincorporated Area	Mono	1,205	50.59%	1,177	49.41%	28	1.18%	2,382	-3.49%
Carmel-by-the-Sea	Monterey	1,137	66.65%	569	33.35%	568	33.29%	1,706	-6.29%
Del Rey Oaks	Monterey	532	64.41%	294	35.59%	238	28.81%	826	-5.35%
Gonzales	Monterey	1,089	74.18%	379	25.82%	710	48.37%	1,468	22.45%
Greenfield	Monterey	1,847	79.10%	488	20.90%	1,359	58.20%	2,335	27.01%
King City	Monterey	1,033	66.35%	524	33.65%	509	32.69%	1,557	24.25%
Marina	Monterey	4,983	70.13%	2,122	29.87%	2,861	40.27%	7,105	3.67%
Monterey	Monterey	7,212	72.91%	2,679	27.09%	4,533	45.83%	9,891	0.40%
Pacific Grove	Monterey	5,501	76.87%	1,655	23.13%	3,846	53.75%	7,156	-1.85%
Salinas	Monterey	20,610	72.18%	7,944	27.82%	12,666	44.36%	28,554	17.08%
Sand City	Monterey	95	72.52%	36	27.48%	59	45.04%	131	12.67%
Seaside	Monterey	5,618	74.55%	1,918	25.45%	3,700	49.10%	7,536	8.31%
Soledad	Monterey	2,378	75.73%	762	24.27%	1,616	51.46%	3,140	26.21%
Unincorporated Area	Monterey	22,279	60.15%	14,759	39.85%	7,520	20.30%	37,038	-0.24%
American Canyon	Napa	5,038	71.27%	2,031	28.73%	3,007	42.54%	7,069	9.53%
Calistoga	Napa	1,317	75.82%	420	24.18%	897	51.64%	1,737	2.46%
Napa	Napa	21,028	70.04%	8,996	29.96%	12,032	40.07%	30,024	2.22%
St. Helena	Napa	1,692	71.51%	674	28.49%	1,018	43.03%	2,366	-5.48%
Yountville	Napa	801	68.34%	371	31.66%	430	36.69%	1,172	-7.03%
Unincorporated Area	Napa	5,806	58.03%	4,200	41.97%	1,606	16.05%	10,006	-4.38%
Grass Valley	Nevada	3,248	58.88%	2,268	41.12%	980	17.77%	5,516	-0.22%
Nevada City	Nevada	1,304	76.17%	408	23.83%	896	52.34%	1,712	2.12%
Truckee	Nevada	5,593	73.25%	2,042	26.75%	3,551	46.51%	7,635	-4.98%
Unincorporated Area	Nevada	17,942	48.76%	18,855	51.24%	-913	-2.48%	36,797	-3.50%
Aliso Viejo	Orange	10,274	57.25%	7,672	42.75%	2,602	14.50%	17,946	5.89%
Anaheim	Orange	52,659	63.37%	30,442	36.63%	22,217	26.73%	83,101	17.66%
Brea	Orange	8,626	51.76%	8,038	48.24%	588	3.53%	16,664	4.82%
Buena Park	Orange	12,637	60.53%	8,239	39.47%	4,398	21.07%	20,876	16.06%
Costa Mesa	Orange	18,732	57.01%	14,128	42.99%	4,604	14.01%	32,860	8.79%
Cypress	Orange	9,406	55.10%	7,664	44.90%	1,742	10.21%	17,070	7.19%
Dana Point	Orange	6,852	46.76%	7,803	53.24%	-951	-6.49%	14,655	0.10%
Fountain Valley	Orange	10,633	50.41%	10,458	49.59%	175	0.83%	21,091	5.93%
Fullerton	Orange	24,887	60.19%	16,459	39.81%	8,428	20.38%	41,346	9.90%
Garden Grove	Orange	25,035	58.51%	17,751	41.49%	7,284	17.02%	42,786	19.64%
Huntington Beach	Orange	37,529	47.26%	41,889	52.74%	-4,360	-5.49%	79,418	3.33%
Irvine	Orange	51,835	65.02%	27,888	34.98%	23,947	30.04%	79,723	8.59%
La Habra	Orange	10,184	59.31%	6,986	40.69%	3,198	18.63%	17,170	14.40%
La Palma	Orange	2,979	57.51%	2,201	42.49%	778	15.02%	5,180	7.25%
Laguna Beach	Orange	7,004	62.63%	4,179	37.37%	2,825	25.26%	11,183	-0.08%
Laguna Hills	Orange	6,132	51.49%	5,777	48.51%	355	2.98%	11,909	2.96%
Laguna Niguel	Orange	14,214	50.65%	13,847	49.35%	367	1.31%	28,061	1.29%
Laguna Woods	Orange	6,476	58.50%	4,594	41.50%	1,882	17.00%	11,070	1.04%
Lake Forest	Orange	16,954	54.08%	14,395	45.92%	2,559	8.16%	31,349	4.52%
Los Alamitos	Orange	2,166	52.65%	1,948	47.35%	218	5.30%	4,114	4.55%
Mission Viejo	Orange	20,425	50.94%	19,671	49.06%	754	1.88%	40,096	2.89%
Newport Beach	Orange	13,841	39.77%	20,963	60.23%	-7,122	-20.46%	34,804	-3.57%
Orange	Orange	24,779	55.03%	20,249	44.97%	4,530	10.06%	45,028	7.07%
Placentia	Orange	9,657	52.87%	8,607	47.13%	1,050	5.75%	18,264	5.46%
Rancho Santa Margarita	Orange	9,125	49.84%	9,184	50.16%	-59	-0.32%	18,309	3.90%
San Clemente	Orange	12,081	43.06%	15,973	56.94%	-3,892	-13.87%	28,054	-0.17%
San Juan Capistrano	Orange	6,510	47.13%	7,304	52.87%	-794	-5.75%	13,814	2.18%
Santa Ana	Orange	46,041	75.76%	14,735	24.24%	31,306	51.51%	60,776	27.77%
Seal Beach	Orange	6,818	51.40%	6,447	48.60%	371	2.80%	13,265	-2.53%
Stanton	Orange	5,037	63.74%	2,865	36.26%	2,172	27.49%	7,902	21.89%
Tustin	Orange	14,147	63.37%	8,176	36.63%	5,971	26.75%	22,323	11.18%
Villa Park	Orange	1,101	36.63%	1,905	63.37%	-804	-26.75%	3,006	-0.52%
Westminster	Orange	13,314	52.94%	11,833	47.06%	1,481	5.89%	25,147	14.86%
Yorba Linda	Orange	11,674	40.05%	17,478	59.95%	-5,804	-19.91%	29,152	1.38%
Unincorporated Area	Orange	24,666	47.54%	27,215	52.46%	-2,549	-4.91%	51,881	2.62%
Auburn	Placer	3,344	49.06%	3,472	50.94%	-128	-1.88%	6,816	-4.42%
Colfax	Placer	292	40.22%	434	59.78%	-142	-19.56%	726	-0.58%
Lincoln	Placer	11,612	44.28%	14,611	55.72%	-2,999	-11.44%	26,223	-0.86%
Loomis	Placer	1,046	31.00%	2,328	69.00%	-1,282	-38.00%	3,374	-4.53%
Rocklin	Placer	13,507	45.43%	16,225	54.57%	-2,718	-9.14%	29,732	-2.57%
Roseville	Placer	30,760	48.31%	32,914	51.69%	-2,154	-3.38%	63,674	-0.72%
Unincorporated Area	Placer	22,349	39.45%	34,297	60.55%	-11,948	-21.09%	56,646	-5.81%
Portola	Plumas	250	39.43%	384	60.57%	-134	-21.14%	634	-2.96%
Unincorporated Area	Plumas	2,962	37.87%	4,859	62.13%	-1,897	-24.26%	7,821	-7.43%
Banning	Riverside	5,021	52.92%	4,467	47.08%	554	5.84%	9,488	9.27%
Beaumont	Riverside	9,340	51.83%	8,682	48.17%	658	3.65%	18,022	12.33%
Blythe	Riverside	992	44.50%	1,237	55.50%	-245	-10.99%	2,229	8.74%
Calimesa	Riverside	1,635	38.03%	2,664	61.97%	-1,029	-23.94%	4,299	7.41%
Canyon Lake	Riverside	1,050	23.01%	3,514	76.99%	-2,464	-53.99%	4,564	1.96%
Cathedral City	Riverside	10,694	76.07%	3,365	23.93%	7,329	52.13%	14,059	15.15%
Coachella	Riverside	4,312	83.02%	882	16.98%	3,430	66.04%	5,194	39.19%
Corona	Riverside	22,706	54.09%	19,274	45.91%	3,432	8.18%	41,980	14.24%
Desert Hot Springs	Riverside	3,643	66.81%	1,810	33.19%	1,833	33.61%	5,453	17.46%
Eastvale	Riverside	9,590	55.98%	7,541	44.02%	2,049	11.96%	17,131	16.26%
Hemet	Riverside	12,004	54.88%	9,868	45.12%	2,136	9.77%	21,872	14.89%
Indian Wells	Riverside	975	41.35%	1,383	58.65%	-408	-17.30%	2,358	-4.64%
Indio	Riverside	13,156	61.39%	8,273	38.61%	4,883	22.79%	21,429	14.11%
Jurupa Valley	Riverside	13,866	60.75%	8,958	39.25%	4,908	21.50%	22,824	23.00%
La Quinta	Riverside	7,678	52.22%	7,024	47.78%	654	4.45%	14,702	4.05%
Lake Elsinore	Riverside	8,993	54.78%	7,425	45.22%	1,568	9.55%	16,418	18.09%
Menifee	Riverside	17,692	49.12%	18,324	50.88%	-632	-1.75%	36,016	11.09%
Moreno Valley	Riverside	31,355	71.12%	12,735	28.88%	18,620	42.23%	44,090	24.11%
Murrieta	Riverside	15,981	44.74%	19,742	55.26%	-3,761	-10.53%	35,723	7.43%
Norco	Riverside	2,405	29.78%	5,670	70.22%	-3,265	-40.43%	8,075	3.00%
Palm Desert	Riverside	11,243	57.49%	8,313	42.51%	2,930	14.98%	19,556	5.80%
Palm Springs	Riverside	16,938	83.64%	3,312	16.36%	13,626	67.29%	20,250	5.96%
Perris	Riverside	10,248	77.57%	2,963	22.43%	7,285	55.14%	13,211	36.37%
Rancho Mirage	Riverside	6,213	65.08%	3,334	34.92%	2,879	30.16%	9,547	3.35%
Riverside	Riverside	47,324	61.23%	29,965	38.77%	17,359	22.46%	77,289	15.24%
San Jacinto	Riverside	6,326	59.79%	4,254	40.21%	2,072	19.58%	10,580	23.14%
Temecula	Riverside	17,632	48.05%	19,063	51.95%	-1,431	-3.90%	36,695	6.43%
Wildomar	Riverside	4,697	42.18%	6,438	57.82%	-1,741	-15.64%	11,135	10.05%
Unincorporated Area	Riverside	55,856	49.71%	56,515	50.29%	-659	-0.59%	112,371	11.37%
Citrus Heights	Sacramento	13,865	47.84%	15,116	52.16%	-1,251	-4.32%	28,981	1.77%
Elk Grove	Sacramento	38,784	62.31%	23,464	37.69%	15,320	24.61%	62,248	6.19%
Folsom	Sacramento	18,262	51.79%	16,997	48.21%	1,265	3.59%	35,259	-2.81%
Galt	Sacramento	3,859	43.94%	4,924	56.06%	-1,065	-12.13%	8,783	5.69%
Isleton	Sacramento	104	52.26%	95	47.74%	9	4.52%	199	0.22%
Rancho Cordova	Sacramento	14,124	58.58%	9,985	41.42%	4,139	17.17%	24,109	5.91%
Sacramento	Sacramento	119,060	76.40%	36,771	23.60%	82,289	52.81%	155,831	7.25%
Unincorporated Area	Sacramento	104,046	55.40%	83,769	44.60%	20,277	10.80%	187,815	2.68%
Hollister	San Benito	7,706	66.95%	3,804	33.05%	3,902	33.90%	11,510	12.76%
San Juan Bautista	San Benito	603	72.30%	231	27.70%	372	44.60%	834	12.71%
Unincorporated Area	San Benito	4,025	49.85%	4,050	50.15%	-25	-0.31%	8,075	2.17%
Adelanto	San Bernardino	3,873	72.72%	1,453	27.28%	2,420	45.44%	5,326	34.36%
Apple Valley	San Bernardino	9,342	41.25%	13,306	58.75%	-3,964	-17.50%	22,648	10.93%
Barstow	San Bernardino	2,112	51.29%	2,006	48.71%	106	2.57%	4,118	16.41%
Big Bear Lake	San Bernardino	680	42.93%	904	57.07%	-224	-14.14%	1,584	2.52%
Chino	San Bernardino	14,197	56.52%	10,923	43.48%	3,274	13.03%	25,120	15.57%
Chino Hills	San Bernardino	13,064	51.20%	12,451	48.80%	613	2.40%	25,515	6.86%
Colton	San Bernardino	7,612	72.04%	2,955	27.96%	4,657	44.07%	10,567	26.34%
Fontana	San Bernardino	34,283	68.89%	15,481	31.11%	18,802	37.78%	49,764	25.41%
Grand Terrace	San Bernardino	2,217	53.75%	1,908	46.25%	309	7.49%	4,125	11.72%
Hesperia	San Bernardino	11,093	49.88%	11,147	50.12%	-54	-0.24%	22,240	23.08%
Highland	San Bernardino	8,076	57.30%	6,019	42.70%	2,057	14.59%	14,095	16.85%
Loma Linda	San Bernardino	3,924	60.94%	2,515	39.06%	1,409	21.88%	6,439	10.55%
Montclair	San Bernardino	5,753	71.89%	2,250	28.11%	3,503	43.77%	8,003	25.91%
Needles	San Bernardino	330	44.78%	407	55.22%	-77	-10.45%	737	9.62%
Ontario	San Bernardino	27,847	67.43%	13,450	32.57%	14,397	34.86%	41,297	23.50%
Rancho Cucamonga	San Bernardino	30,162	53.25%	26,480	46.75%	3,682	6.50%	56,642	10.30%
Redlands	San Bernardino	14,871	56.69%	11,363	43.31%	3,508	13.37%	26,234	7.56%
Rialto	San Bernardino	16,990	74.54%	5,802	25.46%	11,188	49.09%	22,792	28.79%
San Bernardino	San Bernardino	26,489	69.59%	11,577	30.41%	14,912	39.17%	38,066	25.01%
Twentynine Palms	San Bernardino	1,829	53.25%	1,606	46.75%	223	6.49%	3,435	15.83%
Upland	San Bernardino	14,326	54.67%	11,877	45.33%	2,449	9.35%	26,203	8.82%
Victorville	San Bernardino	16,351	64.30%	9,078	35.70%	7,273	28.60%	25,429	25.78%
Yucaipa	San Bernardino	6,724	34.92%	12,534	65.08%	-5,810	-30.17%	19,258	4.51%
Yucca Valley	San Bernardino	2,925	45.24%	3,540	54.76%	-615	-9.51%	6,465	10.79%
Unincorporated Area	San Bernardino	36,678	47.55%	40,463	52.45%	-3,785	-4.91%	77,141	13.42%
Carlsbad	San Diego	30,469	57.70%	22,340	42.30%	8,129	15.39%	52,809	-1.58%
Chula Vista	San Diego	48,530	64.90%	26,243	35.10%	22,287	29.81%	74,773	12.92%
Coronado	San Diego	3,568	49.85%	3,590	50.15%	-22	-0.31%	7,158	-7.35%
Del Mar	San Diego	1,314	61.32%	829	38.68%	485	22.63%	2,143	-4.67%
El Cajon	San Diego	11,836	51.49%	11,152	48.51%	684	2.98%	22,988	16.39%
Encinitas	San Diego	18,836	65.07%	10,110	34.93%	8,726	30.15%	28,946	-1.83%
Escondido	San Diego	23,328	57.59%	17,178	42.41%	6,150	15.18%	40,506	7.83%
Imperial Beach	San Diego	3,493	58.87%	2,440	41.13%	1,053	17.75%	5,933	12.72%
La Mesa	San Diego	14,599	66.20%	7,455	33.80%	7,144	32.39%	22,054	5.35%
Lemon Grove	San Diego	5,298	67.58%	2,542	32.42%	2,756	35.15%	7,840	13.78%
National City	San Diego	7,237	71.86%	2,834	28.14%	4,403	43.72%	10,071	25.36%
Oceanside	San Diego	35,822	58.52%	25,391	41.48%	10,431	17.04%	61,213	5.72%
Poway	San Diego	10,936	52.22%	10,007	47.78%	929	4.44%	20,943	-0.56%
San Diego	San Diego	304,590	69.64%	132,809	30.36%	171,781	39.27%	437,399	5.64%
San Marcos	San Diego	17,929	59.44%	12,234	40.56%	5,695	18.88%	30,163	5.80%
Santee	San Diego	9,885	45.41%	11,883	54.59%	-1,998	-9.18%	21,768	3.17%
Solana Beach	San Diego	3,917	63.24%	2,277	36.76%	1,640	26.48%	6,194	-3.88%
Vista	San Diego	16,052	59.23%	11,048	40.77%	5,004	18.46%	27,100	7.90%
Unincorporated Area	San Diego	78,719	44.69%	97,419	55.31%	-18,700	-10.62%	176,138	3.54%
San Francisco		251,058	85.29%	43,288	14.71%	207,770	70.59%	294,346	5.79%
Escalon	San Joaquin	845	31.87%	1,806	68.13%	-961	-36.25%	2,651	1.85%
Lathrop	San Joaquin	5,191	66.35%	2,633	33.65%	2,558	32.69%	7,824	23.11%
Lodi	San Joaquin	8,358	42.21%	11,444	57.79%	-3,086	-15.58%	19,802	3.38%
Manteca	San Joaquin	13,121	53.24%	11,525	46.76%	1,596	6.48%	24,646	12.08%
Ripon	San Joaquin	1,879	29.83%	4,420	70.17%	-2,541	-40.34%	6,299	-1.50%
Stockton	San Joaquin	40,834	64.89%	22,092	35.11%	18,742	29.78%	62,926	13.13%
Tracy	San Joaquin	14,123	61.26%	8,930	38.74%	5,193	22.53%	23,053	12.41%
Mountain House	San Joaquin	3,319	69.33%	1,468	30.67%	1,851	38.67%	4,787	23.83%
Unincorporated Area	San Joaquin	14,222	39.15%	22,101	60.85%	-7,879	-21.69%	36,323	2.42%
Arroyo Grande	San Luis Obispo	4,752	53.53%	4,126	46.47%	626	7.05%	8,878	-2.11%
Atascadero	San Luis Obispo	6,559	49.07%	6,808	50.93%	-249	-1.86%	13,367	-2.38%
El Paso de Robles	San Luis Obispo	5,470	47.54%	6,037	52.46%	-567	-4.93%	11,507	-0.36%
Grover Beach	San Luis Obispo	2,712	55.83%	2,146	44.17%	566	11.65%	4,858	1.14%
Morro Bay	San Luis Obispo	3,520	62.31%	2,129	37.69%	1,391	24.62%	5,649	-2.38%
Pismo Beach	San Luis Obispo	2,277	51.92%	2,109	48.08%	168	3.83%	4,386	-3.64%
San Luis Obispo	San Luis Obispo	14,419	74.93%	4,824	25.07%	9,595	49.86%	19,243	0.86%
Unincorporated Area	San Luis Obispo	26,588	49.88%	26,712	50.12%	-124	-0.23%	53,300	-1.90%
Atherton	San Mateo	1,816	65.07%	975	34.93%	841	30.13%	2,791	-13.55%
Belmont	San Mateo	8,204	77.79%	2,342	22.21%	5,862	55.59%	10,546	-0.01%
Brisbane	San Mateo	1,440	80.67%	345	19.33%	1,095	61.34%	1,785	5.09%
Burlingame	San Mateo	8,492	75.61%	2,740	24.39%	5,752	51.21%	11,232	0.06%
Colma	San Mateo	324	76.24%	101	23.76%	223	52.47%	425	6.81%
Daly City	San Mateo	17,554	75.99%	5,547	24.01%	12,007	51.98%	23,101	9.91%
East Palo Alto	San Mateo	3,852	87.43%	554	12.57%	3,298	74.85%	4,406	17.15%
Foster City	San Mateo	7,680	73.98%	2,701	26.02%	4,979	47.96%	10,381	0.61%
Half Moon Bay	San Mateo	3,878	75.76%	1,241	24.24%	2,637	51.51%	5,119	0.73%
Hillsborough	San Mateo	2,831	60.97%	1,812	39.03%	1,019	21.95%	4,643	-12.52%
Menlo Park	San Mateo	10,055	80.74%	2,399	19.26%	7,656	61.47%	12,454	-3.88%
Millbrae	San Mateo	5,260	67.01%	2,589	32.99%	2,671	34.03%	7,849	3.62%
Pacifica	San Mateo	12,308	75.60%	3,972	24.40%	8,336	51.20%	16,280	2.33%
Portola Valley	San Mateo	1,807	74.58%	616	25.42%	1,191	49.15%	2,423	-12.58%
Redwood City	San Mateo	20,599	78.94%	5,496	21.06%	15,103	57.88%	26,095	1.54%
San Bruno	San Mateo	9,772	73.09%	3,598	26.91%	6,174	46.18%	13,370	6.10%
San Carlos	San Mateo	10,752	77.29%	3,159	22.71%	7,593	54.58%	13,911	-4.39%
San Mateo	San Mateo	25,827	76.69%	7,848	23.31%	17,979	53.39%	33,675	1.05%
South San Francisco	San Mateo	14,253	75.34%	4,666	24.66%	9,587	50.67%	18,919	7.22%
Woodside	San Mateo	1,715	66.91%	848	33.09%	867	33.83%	2,563	-13.71%
Unincorporated Area	San Mateo	18,515	77.63%	5,336	22.37%	13,179	55.26%	23,851	-1.18%
Buellton	Santa Barbara	1,254	55.24%	1,016	44.76%	238	10.48%	2,270	1.18%
Carpinteria	Santa Barbara	3,709	71.16%	1,503	28.84%	2,206	42.33%	5,212	0.24%
Goleta	Santa Barbara	9,172	71.91%	3,582	28.09%	5,590	43.83%	12,754	1.50%
Guadalupe	Santa Barbara	943	67.70%	450	32.30%	493	35.39%	1,393	21.60%
Lompoc	Santa Barbara	5,781	57.87%	4,208	42.13%	1,573	15.75%	9,989	8.02%
Santa Barbara	Santa Barbara	26,112	78.74%	7,050	21.26%	19,062	57.48%	33,162	1.38%
Santa Maria	Santa Barbara	10,532	58.47%	7,482	41.53%	3,050	16.93%	18,014	15.39%
Solvang	Santa Barbara	1,404	54.08%	1,192	45.92%	212	8.17%	2,596	-1.47%
Unincorporated Area	Santa Barbara	30,773	58.52%	21,814	41.48%	8,959	17.04%	52,587	-1.22%
Campbell	Santa Clara	11,161	72.64%	4,204	27.36%	6,957	45.28%	15,365	0.29%
Cupertino	Santa Clara	12,702	69.56%	5,559	30.44%	7,143	39.12%	18,261	-5.09%
Gilroy	Santa Clara	12,034	67.81%	5,713	32.19%	6,321	35.62%	17,747	8.98%
Los Altos	Santa Clara	10,680	74.59%	3,638	25.41%	7,042	49.18%	14,318	-9.63%
Los Altos Hills	Santa Clara	2,563	66.99%	1,263	33.01%	1,300	33.98%	3,826	-12.00%
Los Gatos	Santa Clara	9,764	69.40%	4,305	30.60%	5,459	38.80%	14,069	-5.72%
Milpitas	Santa Clara	11,974	67.59%	5,742	32.41%	6,232	35.18%	17,716	8.58%
Monte Sereno	Santa Clara	1,098	60.93%	704	39.07%	394	21.86%	1,802	-12.17%
Morgan Hill	Santa Clara	10,733	64.27%	5,966	35.73%	4,767	28.55%	16,699	2.03%
Mountain View	Santa Clara	19,574	80.13%	4,855	19.87%	14,719	60.25%	24,429	-1.95%
Palo Alto	Santa Clara	20,507	79.15%	5,403	20.85%	15,104	58.29%	25,910	-6.10%
San Jose	Santa Clara	191,875	71.30%	77,253	28.70%	114,622	42.59%	269,128	6.72%
Santa Clara	Santa Clara	22,983	73.24%	8,397	26.76%	14,586	46.48%	31,380	5.00%
Saratoga	Santa Clara	8,988	65.41%	4,754	34.59%	4,234	30.81%	13,742	-10.39%
Sunnyvale	Santa Clara	29,536	74.92%	9,886	25.08%	19,650	49.85%	39,422	1.40%
Unincorporated Area	Santa Clara	17,453	65.86%	9,048	34.14%	8,405	31.72%	26,501	-0.86%
Capitola	Santa Cruz	3,451	77.66%	993	22.34%	2,458	55.31%	4,444	0.37%
Santa Cruz	Santa Cruz	21,207	85.53%	3,588	14.47%	17,619	71.06%	24,795	-1.22%
Scotts Valley	Santa Cruz	4,164	70.21%	1,767	29.79%	2,397	40.41%	5,931	-2.49%
Watsonville	Santa Cruz	8,500	80.36%	2,078	19.64%	6,422	60.71%	10,578	16.85%
Unincorporated Area	Santa Cruz	45,186	74.91%	15,132	25.09%	30,054	49.83%	60,318	-0.30%
Anderson	Shasta	865	28.53%	2,167	71.47%	-1,302	-42.94%	3,032	-2.64%
Redding	Shasta	10,843	33.64%	21,387	66.36%	-10,544	-32.71%	32,230	-4.07%
Shasta Lake	Shasta	1,039	31.05%	2,307	68.95%	-1,268	-37.90%	3,346	-3.49%
Unincorporated Area	Shasta	6,391	23.48%	20,830	76.52%	-14,439	-53.04%	27,221	-6.95%
Loyalton	Sierra	79	29.37%	190	70.63%	-111	-41.26%	269	0.72%
Unincorporated Area	Sierra	443	36.61%	767	63.39%	-324	-26.78%	1,210	-6.86%
Dorris	Siskiyou	45	28.30%	114	71.70%	-69	-43.40%	159	-1.53%
Dunsmuir	Siskiyou	320	56.84%	243	43.16%	77	13.68%	563	-7.95%
Etna	Siskiyou	80	30.53%	182	69.47%	-102	-38.93%	262	-10.32%
Fort Jones	Siskiyou	62	28.18%	158	71.82%	-96	-43.64%	220	-13.17%
Montague	Siskiyou	92	20.04%	367	79.96%	-275	-59.91%	459	-16.41%
Mt. Shasta	Siskiyou	837	58.45%	595	41.55%	242	16.90%	1,432	-3.16%
Tulelake	Siskiyou	29	33.72%	57	66.28%	-28	-32.56%	86	-7.38%
Weed	Siskiyou	292	46.79%	332	53.21%	-40	-6.41%	624	-3.75%
Yreka	Siskiyou	818	34.81%	1,532	65.19%	-714	-30.38%	2,350	-5.41%
Unincorporated Area	Siskiyou	3,643	34.86%	6,806	65.14%	-3,163	-30.27%	10,449	-5.67%
Benicia	Solano	9,227	69.15%	4,116	30.85%	5,111	38.30%	13,343	0.50%
Dixon	Solano	3,747	50.10%	3,732	49.90%	15	0.20%	7,479	5.09%
Fairfield	Solano	22,575	66.32%	11,467	33.68%	11,108	32.63%	34,042	6.06%
Rio Vista	Solano	3,445	59.82%	2,314	40.18%	1,131	19.64%	5,759	-2.15%
Suisun City	Solano	5,832	69.84%	2,518	30.16%	3,314	39.69%	8,350	8.23%
Vacaville	Solano	17,720	52.28%	16,174	47.72%	1,546	4.56%	33,894	2.44%
Vallejo	Solano	26,654	76.81%	8,048	23.19%	18,606	53.62%	34,702	7.95%
Unincorporated Area	Solano	3,170	42.18%	4,345	57.82%	-1,175	-15.64%	7,515	-2.18%
Cloverdale	Sonoma	2,412	65.01%	1,298	34.99%	1,114	30.03%	3,710	-0.45%
Cotati	Sonoma	2,530	73.85%	896	26.15%	1,634	47.69%	3,426	2.38%
Healdsburg	Sonoma	4,179	78.24%	1,162	21.76%	3,017	56.49%	5,341	-1.04%
Petaluma	Sonoma	21,091	74.72%	7,135	25.28%	13,956	49.44%	28,226	-0.33%
Rohnert Park	Sonoma	11,903	70.29%	5,032	29.71%	6,871	40.57%	16,935	3.99%
Santa Rosa	Sonoma	51,631	75.94%	16,357	24.06%	35,274	51.88%	67,988	2.90%
Sebastopol	Sonoma	3,639	85.66%	609	14.34%	3,030	71.33%	4,248	1.46%
Sonoma	Sonoma	4,278	76.41%	1,321	23.59%	2,957	52.81%	5,599	-1.18%
Windsor	Sonoma	7,547	65.51%	3,974	34.49%	3,573	31.01%	11,521	0.03%
Unincorporated Area	Sonoma	44,630	71.71%	17,609	28.29%	27,021	43.41%	62,239	-1.44%
Ceres	Stanislaus	5,913	60.40%	3,876	39.60%	2,037	20.81%	9,789	22.09%
Hughson	Stanislaus	884	38.45%	1,415	61.55%	-531	-23.10%	2,299	9.62%
Modesto	Stanislaus	29,874	54.01%	25,434	45.99%	4,440	8.03%	55,308	9.45%
Newman	Stanislaus	1,388	55.23%	1,125	44.77%	263	10.47%	2,513	13.47%
Oakdale	Stanislaus	2,509	33.59%	4,960	66.41%	-2,451	-32.82%	7,469	1.40%
Patterson	Stanislaus	3,790	67.71%	1,807	32.29%	1,983	35.43%	5,597	19.70%
Riverbank	Stanislaus	3,312	50.89%	3,196	49.11%	116	1.78%	6,508	12.38%
Turlock	Stanislaus	8,975	47.10%	10,082	52.90%	-1,107	-5.81%	19,057	9.68%
Waterford	Stanislaus	829	37.12%	1,404	62.88%	-575	-25.75%	2,233	5.54%
Unincorporated Area	Stanislaus	10,602	38.82%	16,709	61.18%	-6,107	-22.36%	27,311	5.11%
Live Oak	Sutter	1,156	49.59%	1,175	50.41%	-19	-0.82%	2,331	16.52%
Yuba City	Sutter	8,242	42.04%	11,362	57.96%	-3,120	-15.92%	19,604	10.41%
Unincorporated Area	Sutter	1,886	23.95%	5,988	76.05%	-4,102	-52.10%	7,874	-2.57%
Corning	Tehama	496	35.76%	891	64.24%	-395	-28.48%	1,387	-6.21%
Red Bluff	Tehama	1,261	34.62%	2,381	65.38%	-1,120	-30.75%	3,642	-0.66%
Tehama	Tehama	47	29.38%	113	70.63%	-66	-41.25%	160	-15.86%
Unincorporated Area	Tehama	3,575	23.47%	11,654	76.53%	-8,079	-53.05%	15,229	-5.95%
Unincorporated Area	Trinity	1,840	40.64%	2,688	59.36%	-848	-18.73%	4,528	-9.34%
Dinuba	Tulare	2,383	61.15%	1,514	38.85%	869	22.30%	3,897	27.88%
Exeter	Tulare	881	33.28%	1,766	66.72%	-885	-33.43%	2,647	3.96%
Farmersville	Tulare	938	69.95%	403	30.05%	535	39.90%	1,341	34.98%
Lindsay	Tulare	1,007	69.50%	442	30.50%	565	38.99%	1,449	29.06%
Porterville	Tulare	5,305	52.55%	4,791	47.45%	514	5.09%	10,096	18.97%
Tulare	Tulare	6,295	44.29%	7,919	55.71%	-1,624	-11.43%	14,214	11.71%
Visalia	Tulare	16,071	43.43%	20,933	56.57%	-4,862	-13.14%	37,004	6.59%
Woodlake	Tulare	773	63.99%	435	36.01%	338	27.98%	1,208	16.39%
Unincorporated Area	Tulare	9,850	39.31%	15,205	60.69%	-5,355	-21.37%	25,055	8.13%
Sonora	Tuolumne	899	50.48%	882	49.52%	17	0.95%	1,781	3.05%
Unincorporated Area	Tuolumne	7,908	37.22%	13,337	62.78%	-5,429	-25.55%	21,245	-1.93%
Camarillo	Ventura	16,571	56.10%	12,966	43.90%	3,605	12.21%	29,537	3.79%
Fillmore	Ventura	3,050	64.63%	1,669	35.37%	1,381	29.26%	4,719	19.36%
Moorpark	Ventura	8,114	57.02%	6,116	42.98%	1,998	14.04%	14,230	5.02%
Ojai	Ventura	2,516	72.82%	939	27.18%	1,577	45.64%	3,455	2.12%
Oxnard	Ventura	34,004	76.59%	10,395	23.41%	23,609	53.17%	44,399	21.07%
Port Hueneme	Ventura	3,938	70.41%	1,655	29.59%	2,283	40.82%	5,593	14.71%
San Buenaventura	Ventura	28,843	65.86%	14,951	34.14%	13,892	31.72%	43,794	5.90%
Santa Paula	Ventura	5,629	70.26%	2,383	29.74%	3,246	40.51%	8,012	18.80%
Simi Valley	Ventura	24,471	50.09%	24,379	49.91%	92	0.19%	48,850	4.34%
Thousand Oaks	Ventura	30,600	57.57%	22,554	42.43%	8,046	15.14%	53,154	1.94%
Unincorporated Area	Ventura	20,569	58.77%	14,432	41.23%	6,137	17.53%	35,001	4.82%
Davis	Yolo	21,995	84.36%	4,079	15.64%	17,916	68.71%	26,074	-2.19%
West Sacramento	Yolo	11,024	64.77%	5,996	35.23%	5,028	29.54%	17,020	6.88%
Winters	Yolo	1,654	56.28%	1,285	43.72%	369	12.56%	2,939	0.07%
Woodland	Yolo	12,249	61.57%	7,646	38.43%	4,603	23.14%	19,895	5.53%
Unincorporated Area	Yolo	4,638	56.51%	3,569	43.49%	1,069	13.03%	8,207	-1.47%
Marysville	Yuba	1,158	39.71%	1,758	60.29%	-600	-20.58%	2,916	3.65%
Wheatland	Yuba	375	28.56%	938	71.44%	-563	-42.88%	1,313	-5.16%
Unincorporated Area	Yuba	7,429	39.01%	11,615	60.99%	-4,186	-21.98%	19,044	3.29%
Totals		7,453,339	64.42%	4,116,998	35.58%	3,336,341	28.84%	11,570,337	8.70%

== See also ==
- 2025 Missouri redistricting
- 2025 Indiana redistricting
- 2026 Virginia redistricting amendment
- California–Texas rivalry
- List of California ballot propositions: 2020–2029

== Notes ==
Partisan clients
