= Napa Valley Register =

Daily newspaper in California, US

- Type: Weekly newspaper
- Format: Broadsheet
- Owner: Hoffmann Media Group
- Founder: J.I. Horrell
- Editor: Dan Evans
- Managing editor: Samie Hartley
- Founded: August 10, 1863; 163 years ago
- Language: English
- Headquarters: 1615 Soscol Avenue; Napa, California 94559
- Country: United States
- Circulation: 13,561 Daily (as of 2023)
- Sister newspapers: St. Helena Star
- OCLC number: 27716818
- Website: napavalleyregister.com

The Napa Valley Register is a weekly newspaper located in Napa, California.

== History ==
On August 10, 1863, the Napa Valley Register first published. It was founded by J.I. Horrell as a pro-Union paper, in contrast to the pro-Secession Napa Echo. By 1864, the newspaper had dropped “Valley” from its name, becoming simply the Napa Register, until returning to the original name over a century later.

Editor R.T. Montgomery retired from the paper in January 1866. He returned that May and sold it to N.E. White in January 1868. White left after six months and Montgomery returned again, only to later sell the Register a second time in November 1869 to R.D. Hopkins, formerly editor of the Vallejo Recorder. Hopkins sold to Rev. George W. Henning and George M. Francis in February 1872. The Register moved to daily publication in December 1872. Henning sold out to Charles A. Gardner in May 1873. Gardner left after a few years to run the St. Helena Star.

George M. Francis became sole owner of the Register in 1878, upon the death of his business partner. Francis was succeeded in ownership by his son George H. Francis in 1932. The paper remained with Francis and various partners until 1958, when it was sold to Scripps League Newspapers. Scripps was acquired by Pulitzer in 1996, and Pulitzer was acquired by Lee Enterprises in 2005.

Dan Evans became the paper's editor in March 2022, and he soon unveiled a newly reconstituted editorial board that October. The board was made up of three members of the newspaper's staff and seven community members. It aimed to assist in driving the official opinion of the paper.

In April 2023, the paper laid off two employees. In July 2023, the paper announced it will reduce its print schedule to three days a week: Tuesday, Thursday and Saturday. Also, the newspaper will transition from carrier to postal delivery. In September 2024, Napa Valley Publishing, which publishes the paper, was sold by Lee Enterprises to Hoffmann Media Group.
