= League of Women Voters of California =

US non-profit, non-partisan political group

- Formation: 1921
- Type: Nonprofit
- Purpose: Political education and advocacy
- Headquarters: Sacramento, CA
- Key people: Jenny Farrell (Executive Director)
- Website: https://lwvc.org/

The League of Women Voters of California is a non-partisan organization that is part of the national League of Women Voters. Founded by Carrie Chapman Catt in the 1920s, The league was formed from the National American Women's Suffrage Association. Their stated goals are to encourage "informed and active participation in government," "increase understanding of major public policy issues," and influence "public policy through education and advocacy." The league has over 65 county groups within the state.

== History ==
The League of Women Voters of California was first established in the 1920s, to further the movement of women voting and in politics after the 19th amendment was passed. Many were confident that women in California would get the vote and with this brought many organizations to California, the League of Women Voters being on a national level. A group called the California Civic League was a huge contributor to getting the vote. This group was helping to advocate for women in the California and national, to get the vote for them. Then in 1911, the vote for women was officially granted in California after a couple years of work. Astonished by the accomplishment, Carrie Chapmen Catt wanted the California Civic League to join forces with her league. In 1921, the California Civic League officially became a part of the League of Women Voters, forming the California Civic League of Women Voters. Eventually changing their name to the League of Women Voters of California in 1946. The League of Women Voters of California was guided by wanting to bring women together with equality in representatives and to give more education on issues in America. At the first League meeting they voted for principle, legislation, and issues to focus on, which included child welfare, education, women in occupations and many more.

The beginning of their work started during the major wars. The league wanted to keep as a nonpartisan group in order to help new women voters during the difficult these difficult times. The league members believed that keeping it this way would help in the success of a democratic government. One major item they started was a class on political education to give women more knowledge of the political system and a sense of activism. With the league not being as radical as early women's groups, they helped to educate women politically. In the 1940s, the League started to become larger and well organized, so they started to come together as a group to reach a common census of specific issue and refer to it as the continuing responsibility. As well during this time, the league had many committees that covered specific issues, like health, housing, jury selection, public schools, state government, and homes for children, that were voted on to make these responsibilities.

=== Early accomplishments ===
The League of Women Voters of California had many legislative successes. One of the first achievements was allowing child labor laws to be ratified in 1923, which would limit the labor of children under the age of eighteen. As well as the helping to get California schools to be reorganized in 1937 to help get better education for all the children in California, they were a part of the fight to get women on the juries. They even were active in the efforts to get the Department of Mental Hygiene established in 1945. They are still active many issues on local, state and national levels.

=== Purpose ===
The main purpose of the League of Women Voters is to provide voter services, give education on voting and political issues while staying nonpartisan, and to provide advocacy for women, as well as others in their communities. The league wants to promote public policy problems through education and advocacy. They aim to help improve welfare for those in America and try to teach political responsibility through being an informed and involved citizen. The biggest causes for the League of Women Voters in California is inclusion, equality and diversity. They want to help include and educate about voting and different issues in America. The League of Women Voters of California work to give all Americans a voice and opportunity to be heard.

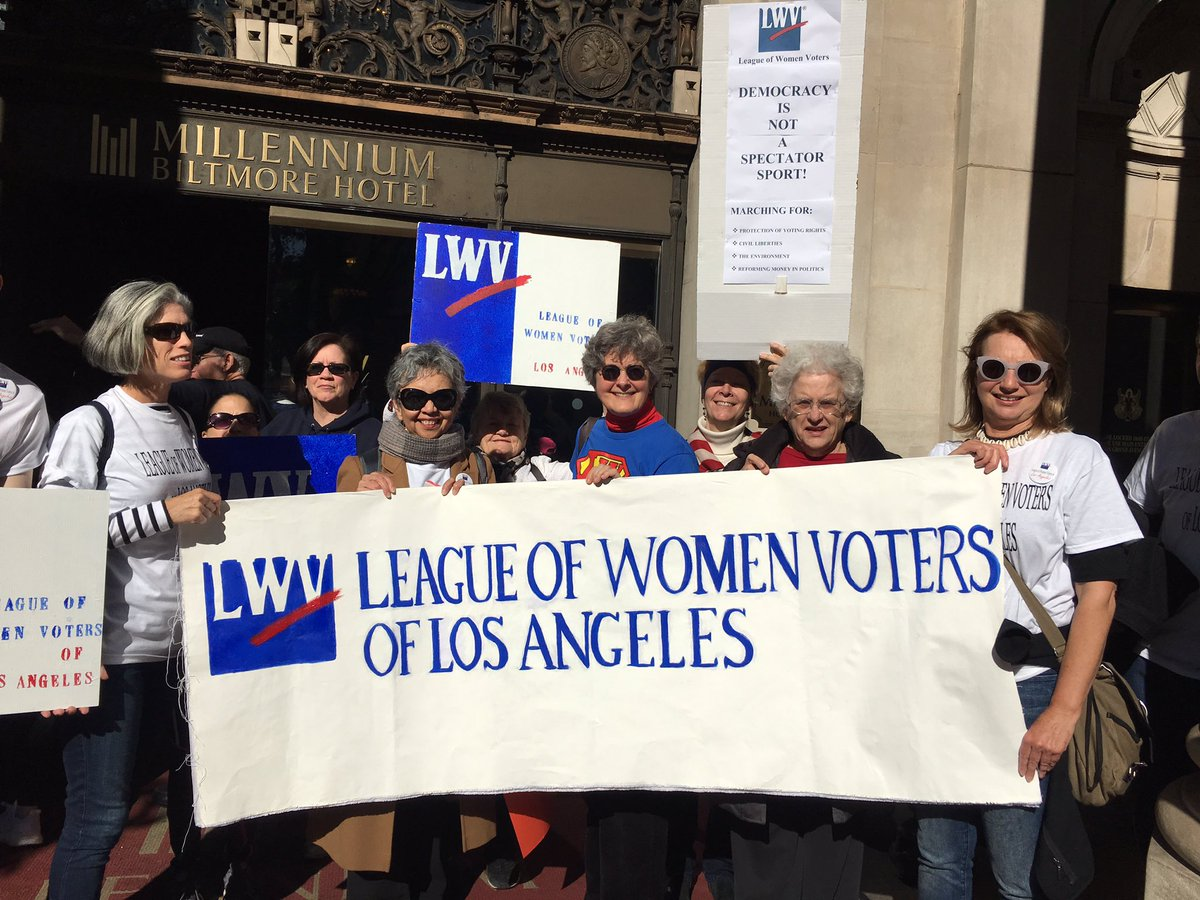
Members of the League of Women Voters of California participations in the Women's March

== Today ==
The League of Women Voters still advocates for women's rights. They continue to advocate for issues such as abortion rights, abolishment of exclusionary zoning, criminal justice reform, racial justice, etc. Although their original goal of the women's right to vote has already been accomplished they always take a stand for justice for all people. Their tools of action include networking, legislative work, advocacy, and voting registration. The League members meet together annually to discuss what issues should be specifically targeted. The three modern day focuses on the League of Women Voters of California are government, natural resources, and social policy. The League of Women Voters of California has kept its integrity and has continued to strive for equity and equality for all people breaking boundaries of sexism and racism. They strive to change policies from local and regional to state and federal levels. Compared to the original movement there have been some changes to include all people, for example in 1973 male members were allowed to join the cause. Although the name of this group sounds exclusive it promotes inclusivity for everyone and fights to change the future. As political uprisings have caused an epidemic of injustice, moving forward the organization's goal is to educate, engage and protect future voters.

=== Accomplishments ===
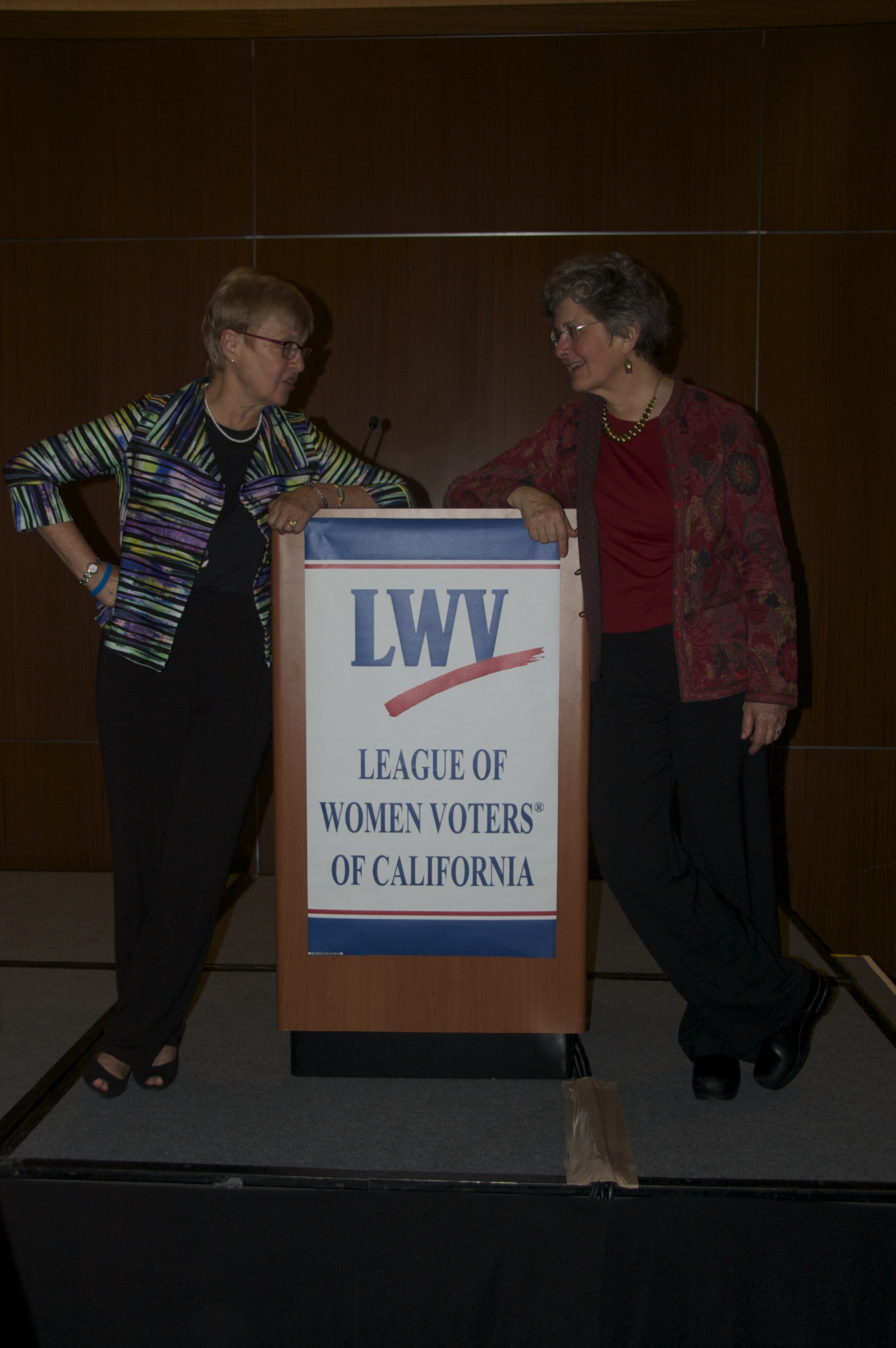
Members League of Women Voters of California at a convention

This organization took a lot of local and regional action for hydraulic fracking, criminal justice reform, gun control, political reform, education, etc. They have advocated for bills and have taken legislative action. For example, for gun control, the League of Women Voters in California supported SB 683, this bill would require all firearm purchasers to hold a valid Firearm Safety Certificate. The league had written to Governor Edmund Brown Junior urging him to sign the bill to limit the ownership of handguns and assault weapons in order to limit gun violence. The governor had signed, chaptering the bill. The League also supported SB 844 about Election ballots, which meant that the public would be provided with accessible, and easy to read information about those who are funding campaigns. This would impact voters, and help them understand more about the different campaigns and their supporters/financers. The League not only wrote a letter to the governor but also Assembly Election and Redistricting Committee members and Senate Elections and Constitutional Amendments Committee members. There are countless other bills that the organization has advocated for by contacting government officials and local leaders, these bills would be beneficial to all residents of California.

=== Goals ===
The League of Women Voters of California sees an opportunity to change the future by making sure the next generation's voices are heard. Not only is educating people on how to vote is important but also providing insights and factual information about important topics is also just as essential as well. An important part of this organization is also not promoting any specific candidate or political party, but rather approaching these issues as human issues, not just liberal and conservative issues. Doing so contributes to the overall goal diminishing the boundaries between different groups of women. Yet they do provide ballot recommendations with non-biased details of the impacts of certain acts and bills, because their goal is to have more people vote from younger generations. Other priorities of the organization are redistricting, elections, referendum and initiative process, voting rights, educating minority communities, making voting accessible for all, and campaigning for certain reforms. Other primary goals of the League of Women Voters in California include striving for a greener and better environment, defending women's reproductive rights, fair redistricting, improving government and access for affordable and quality healthcare for all Americans. Currently the main fight for these members is to preserve the right to an abortion for cis-women, genderfluid people, trans-men, etc. because of the recent overturn of Roe vs. Wade.

== Future ==
In the future the League of Women Voters in California strives to act with integrity, trust, and professionalism. They want to create a workspace that meets the needs of and serves the community, members, and public. Their organization wants to welcome all genders, races, ethnicities no matter their race, ethnicity, or sexual orientation. They also seek to address and acknowledge the original movement and honor the founding principles. They hope to include people of all backgrounds to create a diverse community that represents their goal. They will continue to fight for the women's right of abortion, gun control, environmental and racial justice, and political and criminal justice reform.

== See also ==
- Elections in California
- Category:2024 elections in California
