= St. Helena Star =

- Type: Weekly newspaper
- Format: Broadsheet
- Owner: Hoffmann Media Group
- Founder: DeWitt C. Lawrence
- Publisher: Napa Valley Publishing Co.
- Managing editor: David Stoneberg
- Staff writers: 3
- Founded: 1874
- Language: English
- Headquarters: 1200 Main St., Ste. C, St. Helena, California
- Circulation: 2,500 (every Thursday)
- Sister newspapers: Napa Valley Register
- OCLC number: 11571588
- Website: sthelenastar.com

The St. Helena Star is a weekly newspaper published in St. Helena, California. It is owned by Napa Valley Publishing Co., a subsidiary of Hoffmann Media Group which also publishes the Napa Valley Register. The Star has a circulation of 2,500 and an online edition.

== History ==
On Sept. 28, 1874, DeWitt C. Lawrence published the first edition of the St. Helena Star. After three months it had a circulation of 1,000. Lawrence sold the paper in January 1876 to Charles A. Gardner, former owner of the Napa Valley Register. Gardner leased the paper two years later to N.A. Morford for six months.

Gardner sold a half-interest in March 1883 to Willis A. Mackinder. Gardner retired in January 1884 and sold his share a year later. Mackinder sold the paper in October 1887 to his brother Frank B. Mackinder and Jesse H. Dugan, who retired in October 1891. Decades later Edward Starr Baldwin became editor when the owner F.B. Mackinder, who was his step-father, died in February 1937.

Baldwin became the owner when his mother died in 1963. He sold the Star to newspaper executive J.V. Brenner in 1977. Baldwin died in 1984. Vincent "Vin" Brenner previously worked at Scripps League Newspapers and for a time worked as publisher of the Roseburg News Review and Napa Valley Register. He was joined at the Star by his son, Bill Brenner. In 1989, the Brenners leased The Weekly Calistogan and acquired the paper from Marjorie Brandon in 1996.

A year later both papers were sold to a group of local businessmen led by Paul Krsek. In 2003, Krsek sold the Star and Calistogan to Pulitzer, Inc., owner of the Napa Valley Register. Pultizer was acquired by Lee Enterprises in 2005. The Calistogan ceased in 2022. It had published weekly since 1877. Napa Valley Publishing, which publishes the Star, was sold by Lee Enterprises to Hoffmann Media Group in September 2024.

== Awards ==
In 2011, the California Newspaper Publishers Association awarded the St. Helena Star the 2nd place prize for 2010 in the "General Excellence" category for newspapers its size.
