= Electoral reform in California =

U.S. state electoral reform

Electoral reform in California refers to efforts to change election and voting laws in the U.S. state of California. These efforts have often focused on increasing voter participation or making representation more equitable.

== Ranked-choice voting ==
Since the early 2000s, ranked-choice voting (also known as instant-runoff voting) has gradually expanded across California. In 2002, San Francisco adopted ranked-choice voting in part because of low turnout in its runoff elections. In 2006, Oakland, California passed Measure O, adopting instant runoff voting. In 2006, the city council of Davis voted 3–2 to place a measure on the ballot to recommend use of single transferable vote for city elections; the measure was approved by the electorate. Other cities followed suit, including Berkeley and San Leandro in 2010, Albany in 2022, and Redondo Beach in 2024. However, efforts to make ranked-choice voting more broadly available have stalled in the state legislature. In September 2007, the state legislature approved AB 1294 which would have codified ranked choice elections in state law and allowed general law cities (those without charters) to use these election methods. Governor Arnold Schwarzenegger vetoed this bill. In September 2019, the state legislature approved a similar measure, SB 212. However, Governor Gavin Newsom vetoed this bill.

Despite the lack of success at the state level, outside groups have continued to champion ranked-choice voting. One example is Californians for Electoral Reform, a non-profit organization which promotes the use of ranked choice voting at all levels of government (city, county, state legislature, school boards, etc.).

== Allocation of electoral votes ==
Currently, California's 55 electoral votes are designated to the candidate winning the statewide popular vote. This is in line with every state in the U.S., absent Maine and Nebraska.

=== National Popular Vote Interstate Compact ===
In 2006, the California Legislature passed AB 2948, a bill to join the National Popular Vote Interstate Compact and designate California's electoral votes to the ticket winning the popular vote nationwide. Hours before it was scheduled to become law, Governor Arnold Schwarzenegger vetoed it. In 2011, the legislature one again took up efforts to join this compact through AB 459, which was signed by Governor Jerry Brown.

=== Electors by congressional district ===
Republicans proposed a rival reform, known as the Presidential Election Reform Act, to allocate electoral votes by congressional district, similarly to Maine and Nebraska. The California Democratic Party calculated that this would likely result in 22 of California's electoral votes going to the Republican candidate in the 2008 U.S. Presidential election. Efforts to get the initiative on the ballot in time for the 2008 election failed.

== Redistricting ==
In November 2005, the electorate rejected Proposition 77 which called for a panel of three retired judges to draw boundaries for California's Senate, Assembly, congressional and Board of Equalization districts. It had been viewed with suspicion due to its Republican backers. FairVote suggested that independent redistricting would help avoid gerrymandering, but the major reform needed was the replacement of single member districts with multi-member districts. This would make it possible to implement single transferable vote or other proportional representation systems.

In November 2008, voters in California passed Proposition 11 to reform how electoral districts are drawn in the state. The proposition called for a commission of fourteen non-politician voters to draw boundaries for the Senate, Assembly, and Board of Equalization districts. The commission is to be made up of five Democrats, five Republicans, and four commissioners from neither major party.

In November 2010, Proposition 20 was passed, which put the commission in charge of drawing United States House of Representatives districts in California. However, as part of the larger nationwide trend of mid-decade redistricting, California voters approved Proposition 50 in November 2025, which temporarily replaced the congressional districts drawn by the California Citizens Redistricting Commission with ones approved by the state legislature. After the 2030 census, congressional districts will be drawn once again by the California Citizens Redistricting Commission.

== Nonpartisan blanket primaries ==
In the June 2010 elections, voters approved Proposition 14, establishing the nonpartisan blanket primary as the election method for state and federal offices except for local, non-partisan, and presidential elections. Also known as the top-two primary system, all candidates for an office appear on the same primary ballot regardless of political party affiliation. The two candidates who receive the most votes advance to the general election, even if they belong to the same political party (unlike a traditional primary, in which the two nominees are from different political parties).

== Vote by mail ==
In response to the COVID-19 pandemic, California temporarily allowed for universal mail-in voting for the 2020 election. This resulted in every registered voter being mailed a vote-by-mail ballot as an alternative to in-person voting. This was made permanent in 2021, when Governor Gavin Newsom signed AB 37, making California a vote-by-mail state.As of 2026, California is one eight states (plus Washington D.C) to allow for full voting by mail. However, voters in the state still have access to in-person voting both on and before election day.

== Expansion of the electorate ==
In California, voting rights are restored to felons automatically after release from prison and discharge from parole. Probationers may vote. Prior to 1978, only persons who had a certified medical excuse, or who could demonstrate that they would be out of town on Election Day, were allowed to vote absentee. Today, any voter may vote absentee. In 2004, State Sen. John Vasconcellos (D-Santa Clara) proposed a youth suffrage constitutional amendment called Training Wheels for Citizenship that would give 14-year-olds a quarter vote, 16-year-olds a half vote, and 17-year-olds a full vote.

In 2012, state lawmakers passed a bill to adopt Election Day voter registration with the law taking effect in 2016.

In 2015, California became the second state to pass automatic voter registration with initial implementation expected in the second half of 2016. For context, state officials estimated that there were 6.6 million citizens in California who are eligible but not registered to vote.

== See also ==
- Electoral reform in the United States
- California Counts
- For the effects of Open Primaries and Neutral Party Redistricting upon the 2012 General Election results, see Politics of California#California delegation to the U. S. House of Representatitives
