= Senator Alquist =

Senator Alquist may refer to:

- Al Alquist (1908–2006), California State Senate
- Elaine Alquist (born 1944), California State Senate
