= Senator O'Gara =

Senator O'Gara may refer to:

- Gerald J. O'Gara (1902–1989), California State Senate
- William O'Gara (1931–2024), Maine State Senate
