= Wolfrum =

Wolfrum is a surname. Notable people with the surname include:

- Chet Wolfrum (1910–1973) American politician
- Rüdiger Wolfrum (born 1941), German professor of international law at the Heidelberg University Faculty of Law and director emeritus
- Walter Wolfrum (1923–2010), German World War II fighter ace
- William Wolfrum (1926–2007), suffragan bishop of the Episcopal Diocese of Colorado from 1981 to 1988
