= California's 13th district =

California's 13th district may refer to:

- California's 13th congressional district
- California's 13th State Assembly district
- California's 13th State Senate district
