= James A. Miller (politician) =

American politician

James Andrew Miller
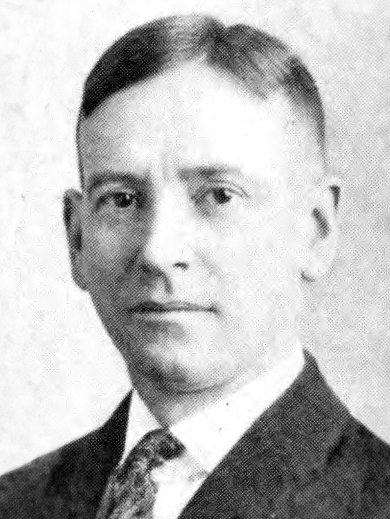

Member of the California State Assembly
- In office January 5, 1925 – January 7, 1935
- Preceded by: Walter J. Rock
- Succeeded by: Kennett B. Dawson
- Constituency: 32nd district (1925–1933); 22nd district (1933–1935)

Personal details
- Born: October 19, 1883 Aurora, Oregon
- Died: 1965 (aged 81–82)
- Party: Republican

Military service
- Branch/service: United States Army
- Battles/wars: World War I

James Andrew Miller (October 19, 1883 – c. 1965) was an American politician who served in the California State Assembly for the 32nd and 22nd district. During World War I he also served in the United States Army.
