= Kennett B. Dawson =

American politician (1896–1961)

Member of the California State Assembly from the 22nd district
- In office January 7, 1935 – January 2, 1939
- Preceded by: James A. Miller
- Succeeded by: George D. Collins Jr.

Personal details
- Born: August 30, 1896 Ogden, Utah
- Died: February 16, 1961 (aged 64) Honolulu, Hawaii
- Party: Republican

Military service
- Branch/service: United States Army
- Battles/wars: World War I

Kennett Berkeley Dawson (August 30, 1896 – February 16, 1961) served in the California State Assembly representing the 22nd district from 1935 to 1939. during World War I he served in the United States Army.
