= Richard D. Hayden =

American politician (1928–2017)

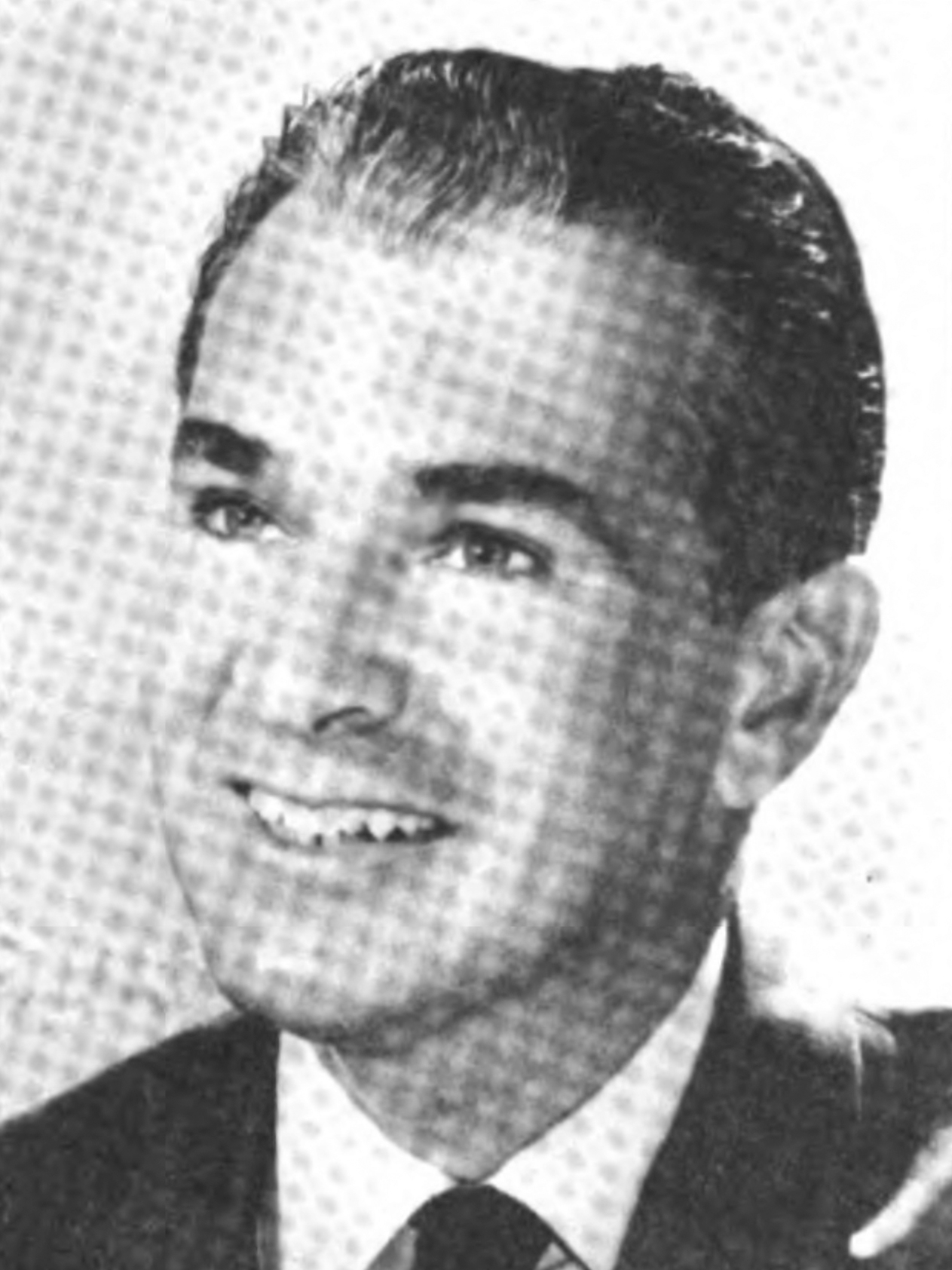
- Official portrait, 1975

Member of the California State Assembly from the 22nd district
- In office January 4, 1971 – November 30, 1980
- Preceded by: George W. Milias
- Succeeded by: Ernie Konnyu

Personal details
- Born: May 7, 1928 Niles, Michigan
- Died: August 4, 2017 (aged 89) Sunnyvale, California
- Party: Republican
- Spouse: Lelia M. "Lea" Hayden
- Children: 2

Richard D. Hayden (May 7, 1928 – August 4, 2017) served as a Republican in the California State Assembly for the 22nd district. During World War II he served in the United States Army. He was born in Niles, Michigan and died in Sunnyvale, California.
