= Hospital Facilities Seismic Safety Act =

1983 California State Legislature act

- Long title: An act relating to health facilities seismic safety
- Citation: Cal. Stats. 1972, ch. 1130
- Signed by: Ronald Reagan
- Signed: December 29, 1972
- Effective: March 7, 1973

Legislative history
- Bill title: SB 519
- Introduced by: Alfred E. Alquist
- Introduced: March 15, 1972

Summary
- Establishes seismic design and construction safety standards for general acute care hospital buildings in California to ensure they remain operational after an earthquake.
- Status: Unknown

The Alfred E Alquist Hospital Facilities Seismic Safety Act of 1983, formerly cited first as the Hospital Seismic Safety Act of 1982 and then as the Hospital Seismic Safety Act of 1983, originally passed in 1972, and sometimes called the Hospital Seismic Safety Act of 1972, the Hospital Seismic Safety Act, the Alquist Act, or the Alquist Seismic Safety Act, is an Act of the California State Legislature, which forms part of the California Health and Safety Code.

The Act was amended by Senate Bill 1953 of 1994, and other Acts.

== Senate Bill 1953 ==
Senate Bill 1953 (California Health and Safety Code §§ 130000 et seq.) was introduced on February 25, 1994. It was signed into law on September 21, 1994. The bill establishes a seismic safety building standards program under OSHPD's jurisdiction for California hospitals built before March 7, 1973. Almost 50% of California's hospitals may have to be retrofitted, reconstructed, or closed to meet the new requirements.
