= Harry Leander Ells =

American politician

Member of the California State Assembly from the 22nd district
- In office January 5, 1903 - January 7, 1907
- Preceded by: William Walter Greer
- Succeeded by: Palmerston Cornick Campbell

Personal details
- Born: November 9, 1854 Cornwallis, Nova Scotia, Canada
- Died: March 7, 1943 (aged 88) Richmond, California
- Party: Republican
- Spouse(s): Katie Seltzer (m.); Maybelle (m.)

Harry Leander Ells (November 9, 1854 - March 7, 1943) served in the California State Assembly for the 22nd district from 1903 to 1907. He was born in Canada. He was a pioneering resident who served as Richmond, California's postmaster, a member of its first school board, and an assemblyman representing Contra Costa County.

Harry Ells High School was named after him.
