= California's 22nd State Assembly district =

American legislative district

Current assemblymember
Juan Alanis; R–Modesto
- Population (2010) • Voting age • Citizen voting age: 462,734; 361,226; 289,604
- Demographics: 48.00% White; 2.10% Black; 23.36% Latino; 23.40% Asian; 0.42% Native American; 1.41% Hawaiian/Pacific Islander; 0.49% other; 0.82% remainder of multiracial
- Registered voters: 265,076
- Registration: 49.48% Democratic; 15.60% Republican; 30.97% No party preference

California's 22nd State Assembly district is one of 80 California State Assembly districts. The district moved from the San Francisco Peninsula to the San Joaquin Valley as part of redistricting in 2022.

== District profile ==
The district is in the southern San Joaquin Valley, including central and western Stanislaus County. It is exurban and rural with a large agricultural economy base. Some citizens commute to work in the San Francisco Bay Area. Modesto, Ceres, Turlock, Patterson, and Newman are the largest communities in the district.

== Election results from statewide races ==
Year	Office	Results
2022	Governor	Dahle 55.5 – 44.5%
2022	Senator	Meuser 52.9 – 47.1%
2021	Recall	No 78.1 – 21.9%
2020	President	Biden 77.3 – 20.7%
2018	Governor	Newsom 74.4 – 25.6%
2018	Senator	Feinstein 62.3 – 37.7%
2016	President	Clinton 75.2 – 19.8%
2016	Senator	Harris 71.7 – 28.3%
2014	Governor	Brown 74.8 – 25.2%
2012	President	Obama 71.4 – 26.3%
2012	Senator	Feinstein 76.3 – 23.7%

== List of assembly members representing the district ==
Due to redistricting, the 22nd district has been moved around different parts of the state. The current iteration resulted from the 2021 redistricting by the California Citizens Redistricting Commission.

Assembly Members	Party	Years served	Counties represented	Notes
Henry A. Pellet	Republican	January 5, 1885 – January 3, 1887	Napa	
Frank Coombs	Republican	January 3, 1887 – January 2, 1893	Napa	
Eben B. Owen	Republican	January 2, 1893 – January 7, 1895	Sacramento	
John E. Butler	Republican	January 7, 1895 – January 4, 1897	Sacramento	
Leonard M. Landsborough	Fusion	January 4, 1897 – January 2, 1899	Sacramento	
Morris Brooke	Democratic	January 2, 1899 – January 1, 1901	Sacramento	
William Walter Greer	Republican	January 1, 1901 – January 5, 1903	Sacramento	
Harry Leander Ells	Republican	January 5, 1903 – January 7, 1907	Contra Costa	
Palmerston Cornick Campbell	Republican	January 7, 1907 – January 4, 1909	Contra Costa	
Thomas D. Johnston	Republican	January 4, 1909 – January 2, 1911	Contra Costa	
Madison Ralph Jones	Republican	January 2, 1911 – January 6, 1913	Contra Costa	
John J. Ford Jr.	Democratic	January 6, 1913 – January 4, 1915	San Francisco	
William P. Kennedy	Progressive Party	January 4, 1915 – January 8, 1917	San Francisco	
Thomas A. Mitchell	Republican	January 8, 1917 – January 6, 1919	San Francisco	
Thomas A. Mitchell	Democratic	January 6, 1919 – January 3, 1921	San Francisco	
Thomas A. Mitchell	Republican	January 3, 1921 – January 3, 1927	San Francisco	
James C. Flynn	Republican	January 3, 1927 – January 23, 1930	San Francisco	Died in office.
Vacant		January 23, 1930 – January 5, 1931	San Francisco	
Frederick C. Hawes	Republican	January 5, 1931 – January 2, 1933	San Francisco	
James A. Miller	Republican	January 2, 1933 – January 7, 1935	San Francisco	
Kennett B. Dawson	Republican	January 7, 1935 – January 2, 1939	San Francisco	
George D. Collins Jr.	Democratic	January 2, 1939 – January 5, 1953	San Francisco	
Bernard R. Brady	Democratic	January 5, 1953 – January 7, 1957	San Francisco	
John A. Busterud	Republican	January 7, 1957 – January 7, 1963	San Francisco	
George W. Milias	Republican	January 7, 1963 – January 4, 1971	Santa Clara	
Richard D. Hayden	Republican	January 4, 1971 – November 30, 1980	Santa Clara	
Ernie Konnyu	Republican	December 1, 1980 – November 30, 1986	Santa Clara	
Chuck Quackenbush	Republican	December 1, 1986 – November 30, 1992	Santa Clara	
John Vasconcellos	Democratic	December 7, 1992 – November 30, 1996	Santa Clara	
Elaine Alquist	Democratic	December 2, 1996 – November 30, 2002	Santa Clara	
Sally J. Lieber	Democratic	December 2, 2002 – November 30, 2008	Santa Clara	
Paul Fong	Democratic	December 1, 2008 – November 30, 2012	Santa Clara	
Kevin Mullin	Democratic	December 3, 2012 – November 30, 2022	San Mateo	
Juan Alanis	Republican	December 5, 2022 – present	Merced, Stanislaus	

== Election results (1990–present) ==
=== 2024 ===
2024 California State Assembly 22nd district
Primary election
Party	Candidate	Votes	%
Republican	Juan Alanis (incumbent)	35,392	57.6
Democratic	Jessica Self	26,015	42.4
Total votes		61,407	100.0
General election
Republican	Juan Alanis (incumbent)	86,858	56.2
Democratic	Jessica Self	67,743	43.8
Total votes		154,601	100.0
Republican hold			

=== 2022 ===
2022 California State Assembly 22nd district
Primary election
Party	Candidate	Votes	%
Republican	Juan Alanis	23,453	36.5
Democratic	Jessica Self	17,315	27.0
Democratic	Chad M. Condit	13,015	20.3
Republican	Joel Gutierrez Campos	8,160	12.7
Republican	Guadalupe 'Lupita' Salazar	2,250	3.5
Total votes		64,193	100.0
General election
Republican	Juan Alanis	60,338	58.1
Democratic	Jessica Self	43,526	41.9
Total votes		103,864	100.0
Republican gain from Democratic			

=== 2020 ===
2020 California State Assembly 22nd district
Primary election
Party	Candidate	Votes	%
Democratic	Kevin Mullin (incumbent)	107,738	75.7
Republican	Mark Gilham	17,942	12.6
Republican	Bridget Mahoney	16,606	11.7
Total votes		142,286	100.0
General election
Democratic	Kevin Mullin (incumbent)	182,419	75.4
Republican	Mark Gilham	59,531	24.6
Total votes		241,950	100.0
Democratic hold			

=== 2018 ===
2018 California State Assembly 22nd district
Primary election
Party	Candidate	Votes	%
Democratic	Kevin Mullin (incumbent)	80,610	74.1
Republican	Christina Laskowski	24,104	22.2
Green	Bridget Duffy	4,106	3.8
Total votes		108,820	100.0
General election
Democratic	Kevin Mullin (incumbent)	145,197	76.8
Republican	Christina Laskowski	43,927	23.2
Total votes		189,124	100.0
Democratic hold			

=== 2016 ===
2016 California State Assembly 22nd district
Primary election
Party	Candidate	Votes	%
Democratic	Kevin Mullin (incumbent)	85,682	76.2
Republican	Art Kiesel	14,998	13.3
Republican	Mark Gilham	11,748	10.4
Total votes		112,428	100.0
General election
Democratic	Kevin Mullin (incumbent)	148,289	74.4
Republican	Art Kiesel	51,046	25.6
Total votes		199,335	100.0
Democratic hold			

=== 2014 ===
2014 California State Assembly 22nd district
Primary election
Party	Candidate	Votes	%
Democratic	Kevin Mullin (incumbent)	42,575	71.0
Republican	Mark Gilham	9,053	15.1
Republican	Jonathan Emmanuel Madison	8,297	13.8
Total votes		59,925	100.0
General election
Democratic	Kevin Mullin (incumbent)	73,928	70.6
Republican	Mark Gilham	30,781	29.4
Total votes		104,709	100.0
Democratic hold			

=== 2012 ===
2012 California State Assembly 22nd district
Primary election
Party	Candidate	Votes	%
Democratic	Kevin Mullin	51,578	68.5
Republican	Mark Gilham	23,738	31.5
Total votes		75,316	100.0
General election
Democratic	Kevin Mullin	126,519	71.4
Republican	Mark Gilham	50,684	28.6
Total votes		177,203	100.0
Democratic hold			

=== 2010 ===
2010 California State Assembly 22nd district
Party	Candidate	Votes	%
Democratic	Paul Fong (incumbent)	74,501	67.1
Republican	Eric Shooter Hickok	30,143	27.1
Libertarian	T.J. Campbell	6,478	5.8
Total votes		111,122	100.0
Democratic hold			

=== 2008 ===
2008 California State Assembly 22nd district
Party	Candidate	Votes	%
Democratic	Paul Fong	109,249	76.1
Republican	Brent Oya	34,230	23.9
Total votes		143,479	100.0
Democratic hold			

=== 2006 ===
2006 California State Assembly 22nd district
Party	Candidate	Votes	%
Democratic	Sally Lieber (incumbent)	66,941	68.8
Republican	Roger Riffenburgh	30,369	31.2
Total votes		97,310	100.0
Democratic hold			

=== 2004 ===
2004 California State Assembly 22nd district
Party	Candidate	Votes	%
Democratic	Sally Lieber (incumbent)	91,561	70.3
Republican	Marie Dominguez-Gasson	38,746	29.7
Total votes		130,307	100.0
Democratic hold			

=== 2002 ===
2002 California State Assembly 22nd district
Party	Candidate	Votes	%
Democratic	Sally Lieber	48,543	58.5
Republican	Stan Kawczynski	30,555	36.7
Libertarian	Kennita Watson	4,003	4.8
Total votes		83,101	100.0
Democratic hold			

=== 2000 ===
2000 California State Assembly 22nd district
Party	Candidate	Votes	%
Democratic	Elaine Alquist (incumbent)	81,401	67.5
Republican	Stan Kawczynski	39,149	32.5
Total votes		120,550	100.0
Democratic hold			

=== 1998 ===
1998 California State Assembly 22nd district
Party	Candidate	Votes	%
Democratic	Elaine Alquist (incumbent)	61,980	63.8
Republican	Stan Kawczynski	30,186	31.1
Libertarian	Raul Rako	3,562	3.7
Natural Law	Rick Dunstan	1,414	1.5
Total votes		97,142	100.0
Democratic hold			

=== 1996 ===
1996 California State Assembly 22nd district
Party	Candidate	Votes	%
Democratic	Elaine Alquist	74,304	60.1
Republican	Karin Dowdy	44,505	36.0
Natural Law	Frank Strutner	4,738	3.8
Total votes		123,547	100.0
Democratic hold			

=== 1994 ===
1994 California State Assembly 22nd district
Party	Candidate	Votes	%
Democratic	John Vasconcellos (incumbent)	56,272	56.3
Republican	Karin Dowdy	43,678	43.7
Total votes		99,950	100.0
Democratic hold			

=== 1992 ===
1992 California State Assembly 22nd district
Party	Candidate	Votes	%
Democratic	John Vasconcellos (incumbent)	81,578	54.4
Republican	Tim Jeffries	59,120	39.4
Libertarian	Bob Goodwyn	9,367	6.2
Total votes		150,065	100.0
Democratic gain from Republican			

=== 1990 ===
1990 California State Assembly 22nd district
Party	Candidate	Votes	%
Republican	Chuck Quackenbush (incumbent)	65,365	59.0
Democratic	Bob Levy	38,382	34.7
Libertarian	Jon Petersen	6,968	6.3
Total votes		110,715	100.0
Republican hold			

== See also ==
- California State Assembly
- California State Assembly districts
- Districts in California
