= Robert I. McCarthy =

American politician

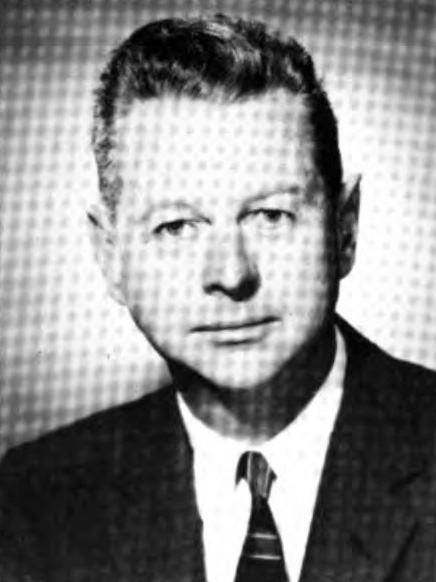
- Official portrait, 1958

Member of the California State Senate from the 14th district
- In office January 3, 1955 – January 5, 1959
- Preceded by: Gerald J. O'Gara
- Succeeded by: Gene McAteer

Member of the California State Assembly from the 25th district
- In office January 3, 1949 – January 5, 1953
- Preceded by: Raymond W. Blosser
- Succeeded by: Daniel J. Creedon

Personal details
- Born: Robert Ignatius McCarthy; December 6, 1920 San Francisco, California, U.S.
- Died: November 29, 2007 (aged 86) San Francisco, California, U.S.
- Party: Democratic
- Spouse: Elizabeth Jane Caulfield (m. 1946)
- Children: 11
- Relatives: John F. McCarthy (brother)
- Education: University of San Francisco

Military service
- Allegiance: United States
- Branch/service: United States Army
- Battles/wars: World War II

Robert Ignatius McCarthy (December 6, 1920 – November 29, 2007) was an American politician who served in the California State Assembly for the 25th district and served as a State Senator for the 14th district. During World War II, he served in the United States Army. His younger brother, Republican John F. McCarthy, served in the Senate from 1951 to 1970.
