= John A. Busterud =

American politician (1921–2016)

John Busterud
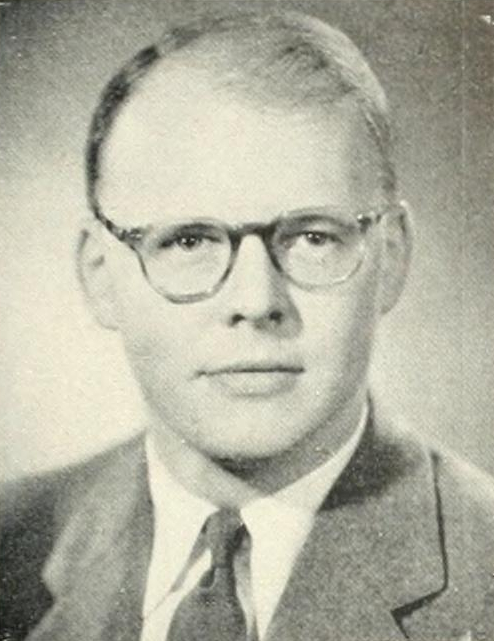
- Busterud c. 1954

Chair of the Council on Environmental Quality
- In office 1976–1977
- President: Gerald Ford
- Preceded by: Russell Peterson
- Succeeded by: Charles Warren

Member of the California State Assembly from the 22nd district
- In office January 7, 1957 – January 7, 1963
- Preceded by: Bernard R. Brady
- Succeeded by: George W. Milias

Personal details
- Born: John Armand Busterud; March 7, 1921 Coos Bay, Oregon, U.S.
- Died: January 4, 2016 (aged 94) San Rafael, California, U.S.
- Party: Republican
- Spouse: Anne Witwer (m. 1953; div. 2015)
- Children: 3
- Education: University of Oregon (BA)

Military service
- Branch/service: United States Army
- Rank: Lieutenant Colonel
- Battles/wars: World War II

John Armand Busterud (March 7, 1921 - January 4, 2016) was a Republican Assemblyman in the California legislature for the 22nd District. He was also Chair of the Council on Environmental Quality, was married to Anne Witwer and had three children: John, James and Mary.

== Military service ==
After college, Busterund became an officer in the United States Army and served 90th Infantry Division in World War II. His unit seized art and gold hidden by Germany in a salt mine. He wrote the Below The Salt, an account of his units capture of the German gold reserves at Merkers Mine in the war. After the war, Busterund continued his service in the army and achieved the rank of lieutenant colonel.

Political offices
Preceded by Russell Peterson	Chair of the Council on Environmental Quality; 1976–1977	Succeeded by Charles Warren
