= Jerry Hill (politician) =

American politician (born 1947)

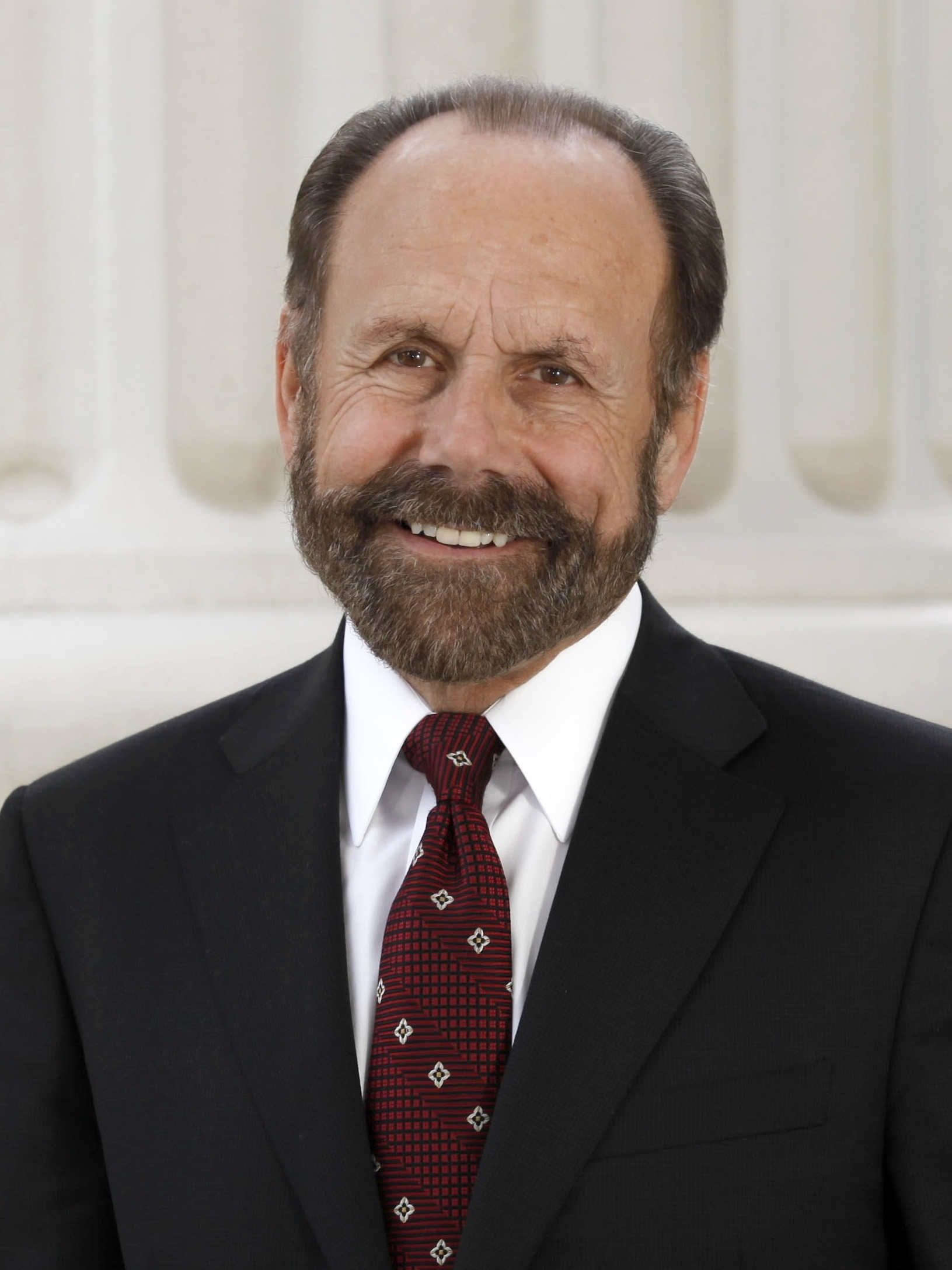
- Official portrait, 2014

Member of the California State Senate from the 13th district
- In office December 3, 2012 – November 30, 2020
- Preceded by: Elaine Alquist (redistricted)
- Succeeded by: Josh Becker

Member of the California State Assembly from the 19th district
- In office December 1, 2008 – November 30, 2012
- Preceded by: Gene Mullin
- Succeeded by: Phil Ting

Member of the San Mateo County Board of Supervisors from the 2nd District
- In office December 7, 1998 – December 1, 2008
- Succeeded by: Carole Groom

Mayor of San Mateo
- In office 1994–1998

San Mateo City Council
- In office 1991–1994

Personal details
- Born: April 18, 1947 (age 79) San Francisco, California, U.S.
- Party: Democratic
- Spouse: Sky Hill
- Children: 1
- Education: College of San Mateo; University of California, Berkeley (BA); San Francisco State University (MA)
- Profession: Adjunct professor

Gerald A. "Jerry" Hill (born April 18, 1947) is an American politician who served in the California State Senate as a member for the Democratic Party. He represented the 13th Senate District during his time in the California State Senate.

Before being elected to the State Senate in 2012, Hill served in the California State Assembly representing the 19th Assembly District. Before serving in the Legislature, he was a member of the San Mateo City Council, where he served one term as Mayor. He also served on the San Mateo County Board of Supervisors.

== Early life ==
Hill was born in Bay Area, San Francisco, in 1947. He graduated from Balboa High School in San Francisco. Hill attended the University of California, Berkeley, where he graduated with a Bachelor of Arts. He later received a secondary teaching credential from San Francisco State University.

In the 1980s, Hill became president of his local homeowner's association.

== Political career ==
=== San Mateo City Council (1991–1998) ===
In 1991, Hill led a successful campaign for a seat on the San Mateo City Council. During his tenure on the San Mateo City Council, he authored a City of San Mateo ordinance that regulated the sale of tobacco and restricted smoking in public places. While a member of the city council and as Mayor of San Mateo, Hill served as a board member for San Mateo Transit District (SamTrans) and the Peninsula Corridor Joint Powers Authority (Caltrain). Hill served one term as mayor in 1994.

=== San Mateo County Board of Supervisors (1998–2008) ===
Elected to the San Mateo County Board of Supervisors in 1998, Hill worked with stakeholders to establish a new homeless shelter for a county which was located far away from local neighborhoods. Hill also pushed to expand the Children’s Health Initiative to help 17,000 children. Hill also served on the California Air Resources Board and as chair of the Bay Area Air Quality Management District.

=== California State Assembly (2008–2012) ===
Hill won the Democratic primary for California's 19th State Assembly district in June 2008 against contenders, Millbrae Mayor Gina Papan and Richard Holober.

In the November 2008 general election, Hill received 73 percent of the vote against Republican Catherine Brinkman's 23 percent. Hill succeeded Democrat Gene Mullin who was termed-out of office. Hill was re-elected to the California's 19th State Assembly district in 2010 with a similar percent of the vote.

=== California State Senate (2012–2020) ===
In 2012, Jerry Hill announced his campaign for the California State Senate after the California Citizen's Redistricting Commission released the new map of the 13th District. In the June 2012 primary election, Hill finished first among four competitors, with 51% of the vote. He served in the California State Senate from 2012 to 2020.

== Awards ==
Hill has been recognized by the California Healthcare Institute which named him its Legislator of the Year. Hill also received recognition from the San Mateo County Association of REALTORS, TechNet, TechAmerica, California State Sheriffs Association, and California Small Business Association. He has received positive voting records from the LGBT community, California Labor Federation, Sierra Club, League of Conservation Voters, Consumer Federation of California, Congress of California Seniors, Equality California, and Planned Parenthood.

The California Clean Money Action Fund named Jerry Hill "Clean Money Champion" for "his leadership in pushing for real reform".
