= George W. Milias =

American politician (1925–1977)

Member of the California State Assembly from the 22nd district
- In office January 7, 1963 – January 4, 1971
- Preceded by: John A. Busterud
- Succeeded by: Richard D. Hayden

Personal details
- Born: September 20, 1925 Gilroy, California, U.S.
- Died: October 1, 1977 (aged 52) Alexandria, Virginia, U.S.
- Party: Republican
- Education: San Jose State College; Stanford University

George Wallace Milias (September 20, 1925 – October 1, 1977) was a Republican California State Assemblyman, who represented the 22nd Assembly District from 1963 to 1971.

Born in Gilroy, California, Milias earned his B.A. with a double major in History and Political Science from San Jose State College and earned his A.M. in California Political History from Stanford University.

Milias served as a member of the Santa Clara County Planning Commission from 1958 to 1962, serving as its Vice Chair in 1961 and Chair in 1962. He also served on the Santa Clara County Grand Jury from 1954 to 1956, serving as Foreman in 1956.

In Republican politics, Milias served as President of the California Republican Assembly from 1957 to 1958 and Chairman of the California Republican Party from 1958 to 1960. He also served as Vice Chairman of the California delegation to the 1960 Republican National Convention that nominated California Republican Richard Nixon for President of the United States. He was also a delegate to the 1968 Convention that again nominated Nixon for President. In 1960, Milias was named to the National Young Republican Hall of Fame.

Elected to the Assembly in 1962, Milias served as Vice Chair of the Fish and Game Committee and of the Conservation and Wildlife Committees during his entire legislative tenure. He also served as Chairman of the Natural Resources and Conservation Committee and a member of the Elections and Constitutional Amendments Committee and the Government Administration Committee.

Instead of seeking a fifth term in the Assembly in 1970, Milias sought the Republican nomination for California Secretary of State but lost the nomination to James L. Flournoy, the first African American nominated for partisan statewide office in California, though Flournoy went on to lose the general election to future Governor Jerry Brown, the son of former Governor Pat Brown.

From 1973 to 1974, Milias was director of environmental quality for the United States Department of Defense.

In the 1974 election, Milias was the Republican nominee for California's 13th congressional district but was defeated by San Jose Mayor Norman Mineta.

From 1974 to 1977, Milias was deputy director of the United States Fish and Wildlife Service.

Wallace was Milias's mother's maiden name.

Milias married Mary Ann in 1962.

California Assembly
Preceded by John A. Busterud	California State Assemblyman; 22nd District; January 7, 1963 – January 4, 1971	Succeeded by Richard D. Hayden
