= Josh Becker (politician) =

American politician from California (born 1969)

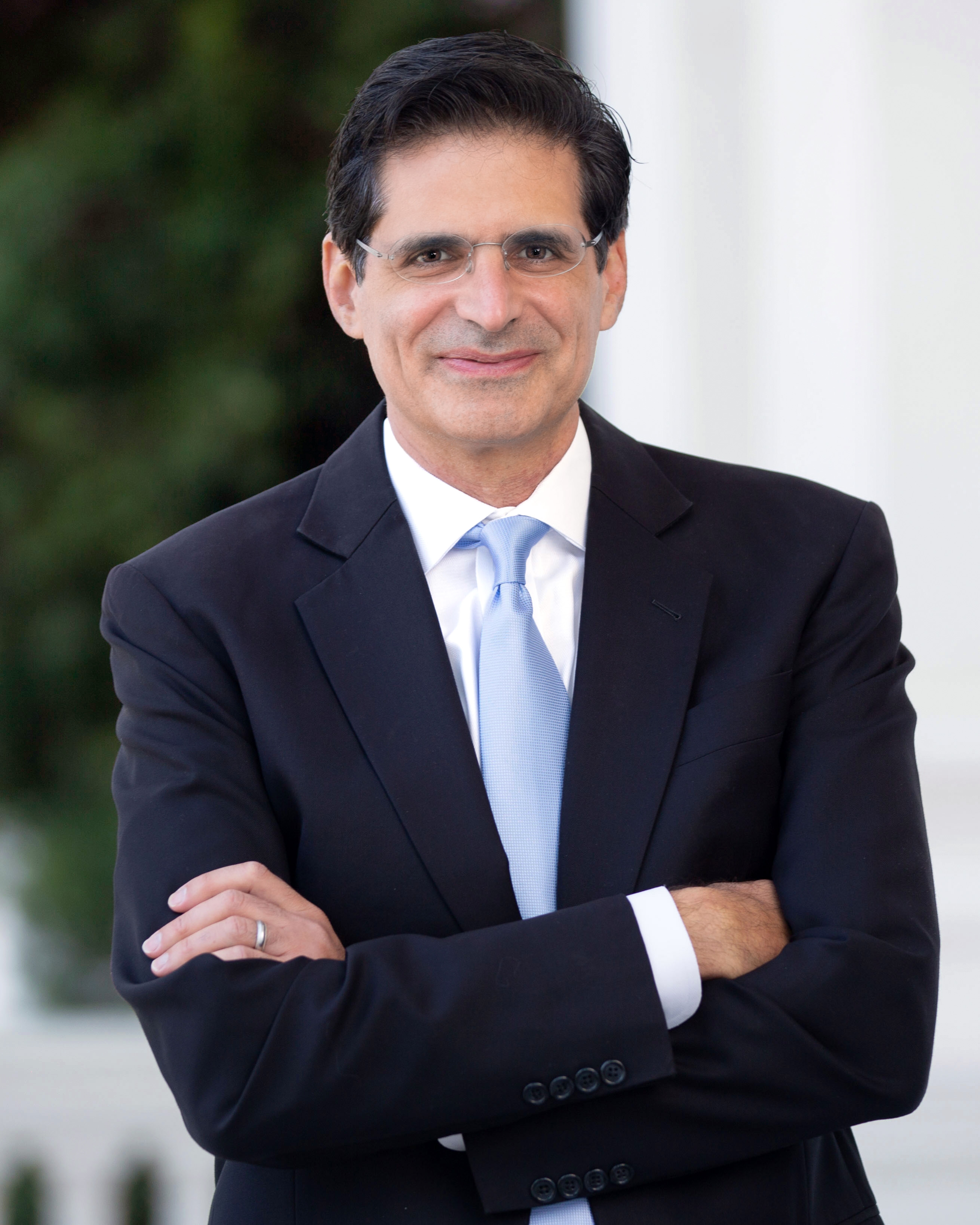
- Official portrait, 2020

Member of the California State Senate from the 13th district
- Incumbent
- Assumed office December 7, 2020
- Preceded by: Jerry Hill

Personal details
- Born: April 13, 1969 (age 57) Villanova, Pennsylvania, U.S.
- Party: Democratic
- Spouse: Jonna
- Children: 2
- Education: Williams College (BA); Stanford University (JD, MBA)

Josh Becker (born April 13, 1969) is an American politician currently in the California State Senate. He is a Democrat representing the 13th Senate District, which encompasses most of San Mateo County and part of Santa Clara County. Prior to being elected to the State Senate in November 2020, he was initiator of the Full Circle community organization and the CEO of Lex Machina. He is Vice chair of the California Legislative Jewish Caucus.

== Early life and education ==
Becker attended Williams College and Stanford University. During his time as a Stanford student, he cofounded a program called the Stanford Board Fellows, which trained students to serve in local nonprofit organizations and in social progress. He graduated from the university with a JD–MBA degree in 1999.

== Career ==
A year after he graduated from the university, Becker established the Full Circle community organization. The organization funds nonprofit and supported policy innovations and community organizations in economic opportunity, education, environmental sustainability and health.

Becker was appointed as part of the California State Workforce Development Board and Child Care Partnership Council in San Mateo County by California Governor Jerry Brown. He served seven years on the board and council.

After his father's death from brain cancer, Becker founded a biotech company for cancer cure research. Becker also founded New Cycle Capital. He joined Lex Machina in 2011 and as its CEO, he made the company into a nationally recognized platform. In 2020, he found a legal tech accelerator that supported legal and public policy system innovators.

=== California State Senate ===
Becker was elected to the California State Senate in the 2020 California State Senate election. He was sworn into office on December 7, 2020, replacing Jerry Hill, who was termed out.

Becker appointed Bryan King as his chief of staff and Nicole Fernandez as his district director.

During the COVID-19 pandemic, Becker supported prioritizing teachers, early childhood educators and child care providers for early access to COVID-19 vaccinations, immediately after health care workers and vulnerable seniors.

Becker is a member of the Senate Climate Workgroup and has authored multiple climate action bills, including one that would require more frequent reporting by electricity providers on energy sources, another that would establish an earlier net zero goal for state agencies, and a few bills aimed at facilitating electrification.

=== Possible Congressional candidacy ===
After the retirement of Congresswoman Anna Eshoo, Becker has stated that he may be a candidate to succeed her in the United States House of Representatives. On December 6, 2023, Becker stated that he would seek reelection to the state Senate.

== Electoral history ==
=== 2020 ===
2020 California State Senate 13th district election
Primary election
Party	Candidate	Votes	%
Democratic	Josh Becker	66,428	23.8
Republican	Alex Glew	48,378	17.3
Democratic	Sally Lieber	47,773	16.9
Democratic	Shelly Masur	45,211	16.2
Democratic	Annie Oliva	33,311	11.9
Democratic	Mike Brownrigg	32,481	11.6
Libertarian	John Webster	5,910	2.1
Total votes		279,492	100.0
General election
Democratic	Josh Becker	348,005	75.4
Republican	Alex Glew	113,315	24.6
Total votes		461,320	100.0
Democratic hold			

=== 2024 ===
2024 California State Senate 13th district election
Primary election
Party	Candidate	Votes	%
Democratic	Josh Becker (incumbent)	167,285	73.6
Republican	Alex Glew	42,841	18.8
Republican	Christina Laskowski	17,295	7.6
Total votes		227,421	100.0
General election
Democratic	Josh Becker (incumbent)	314,889	72.5
Republican	Alex Glew	119,674	27.5
Total votes		434,563	100.0
Democratic hold			
