= Al Alquist =

American politician (1908–2006)

Alfred E. Alquist
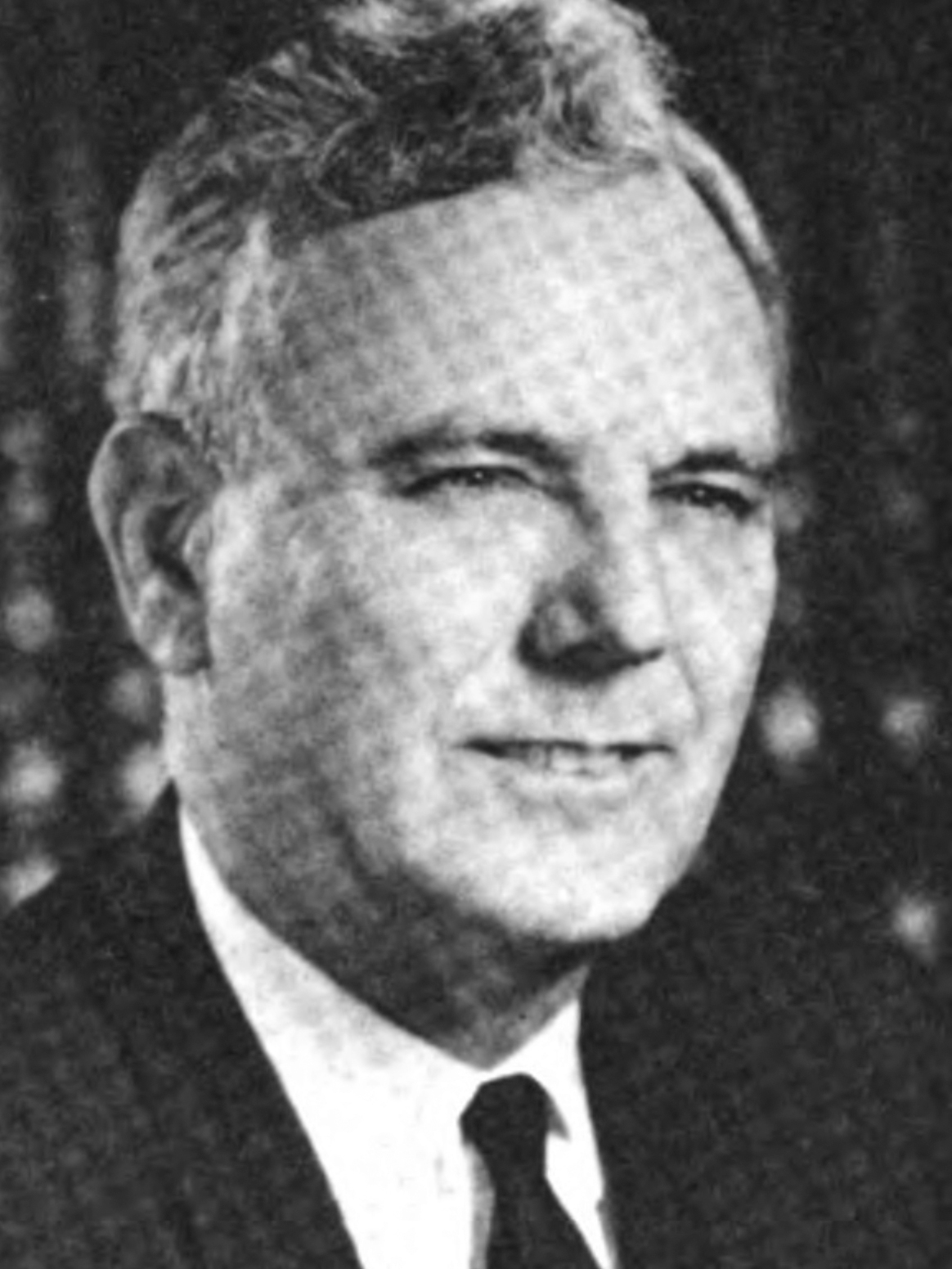
- Official portrait, 1971

Member of the California Senate from the 13th district
- In office December 3, 1984 – November 30, 1996
- Preceded by: John Garamendi
- Succeeded by: John Vasconcellos
- In office January 2, 1967 – November 30, 1976
- Preceded by: John F. McCarthy
- Succeeded by: John Garamendi

Member of the California Senate from the 11th district
- In office December 6, 1976 – November 30, 1984
- Preceded by: Nicholas C. Petris
- Succeeded by: Becky Morgan

Member of the California State Assembly from the 24th district
- In office January 7, 1963 – January 2, 1967
- Preceded by: Edward M. Gaffney
- Succeeded by: John Vasconcellos

Personal details
- Born: August 2, 1908 Memphis, Tennessee, U.S.
- Died: March 27, 2006 (aged 97) Sacramento, California, U.S.
- Party: Democratic
- Spouse(s): Mai Alquist; Elaine Alquist

Military service
- Branch/service: United States Army
- Battles/wars: World War II

Alfred E. Alquist (August 2, 1908 – March 27, 2006) was an American politician who was a California state senator from 1976 to 1996.

== Biography ==
Born in 1908 in Memphis, Tennessee, the son of a Swedish immigrant who worked for the railroads, Alquist was barely a teenager when he started carrying water to railroad work crews. He became a timekeeper, switchman, brakeman and conductor, before serving with the Army Air Forces during World War II. He was a yardmaster for the Southern Pacific Railroad when he and his first wife, Mai Alquist, moved to San Jose, California in 1947.

Alquist was elected to the California State Assembly in 1962, and four years later, the State Senate, where he served for 30 years. A forceful and savvy state legislator, he chaired the powerful Senate Finance Committee for 15 years. He also routinely chaired the two-house conference committee that wrote the final version of the state budget before it went to the Assembly and Senate floors.

He was the Democratic nominee for Lieutenant Governor of California in 1970 but was defeated by incumbent Republican Lieutenant Governor Edwin Reinecke.

He was perhaps best known for his co-authorship of the landmark 1974 law, known as the Warren-Alquist Act, which created the California Energy Commission and became a national model. In the legislature, Alquist also helped to establish the Santa Clara County transit system, the state's earthquake safety programs Office of Statewide Health Planning and Development (OSHPD), which became the Department of Health Care Access and Information (HCAI) in 2022, and Hospital Facilities Seismic Safety Act (HSSA), and the state Energy Commission. A pragmatic New Deal Democrat, he earned a reputation for helping the poor and representing the interests of labor. When term limits forced him to retire in 1996, he was the Legislature's ranking member.

Alquist died of pneumonia in Sacramento, California, in 2006. He was 97 years old. A state office building in downtown San Jose, which he had advocated to get built, is named for him.

== Family ==
Alquist was married to Mai Alquist. His second wife, Elaine Alquist, held his same Senate seat for two terms, from 2004 to 2012. He had a child, Alan Alquist.

== See also ==
- Hal Bernson, Los Angeles City Council member, given the Alfred E. Alquist Award for Achievement in Earthquake Safety in 1997
