= Thomas F. Keating =

American politician (1905–1984)

Thomas Francis Keating

Member of the California Senate from the 13th district
- In office January 4, 1937 – September 15, 1950
- Preceded by: Charles F. Reindollar
- Succeeded by: John F. McCarthy

Personal details
- Born: June 28, 1905 Sausalito, Marin County, California, US
- Died: October 6, 1984 (aged 79) Marin County, California, US
- Resting place: Mount Olivet Catholic Cemetery
- Party: Democratic (1937–1941); Republican (1941–1984)
- Spouse: Elena Elizabeth Brown (m. 1949)
- Children: 5
- Education: UC Hastings Law School

Thomas Francis Keating (June 28, 1905 - October 6, 1984) was an American politician, Lawyer and member of the California State Senate from 1937 until his resignation in 1950. Keating was initially a Democrat member of the Senate from 1937 to 1940, before he later changed to become a Republican member in 1941.

== Early life and education ==
Thomas Francis Keating was born on June 28, 1905, in Sausalito, California. He attended Tamalpais High School, along with his brother Richard, where he graduated from High School and later studied law at the UC Hastings College of the Law in San Francisco, where he graduated in 1931.

== Career ==
Following his graduation, Keating established a prominent legal and political career in California. before beginning his political career as a State Senate, Keating served as a member of the San Rafael City Planning Commission from 1932 to 1936. He later served in the State Senate, representing Marin County from 1937 to 1940, before he continued serving as a Republican from 1941 to 1950.

Keating resigned in 1950 from the State Senate to become a Judge of the Superior Court from 1950 to 1972. After retiring from the bench in 1972, Keating remained active in several Marin County community organizations, including Marin County Historical Society, Boy Scouts and Redwood Empire Association, until his death in 1984.

== Family ==
His father was John Joseph Keating and his mother was Elena Elizabeth Brown.

Keating married Margaret Elizabeth Shearer on June 3, 1949, in Arlington, Virginia. Together they had five children: Tom keating, Kathleen Keating, Rich Keating, Jim Keating and Suzy Keating.
