= Harry Ells High School =

- Richmond, California; United States

Information
- Type: Public high school
- Established: 1955
- Closed: 1985
- School district: Richmond Unified School District
- Colors: Purple and White

Harry Ells High School in Richmond, California, United States, was a major public high school serving the community from 1955 to 1985 with a gap of 3 years (1967–70) when it served as the temporary South campus of Richmond High School. It was named for Harry Leander Ells (1854–1943), a pioneering resident who served as Richmond's postmaster, a member of its first school board, and an assemblyman representing Contra Costa County.

== History ==
Ells originally opened as a middle school in 1944, as Richmond grew from the influx of World War II manufacturing and shipyard workers and their families. Ells was changed to a high school in 1955 and graduated its first class in 1958. In the Fall of 1967, it became Richmond High School South Campus while Richmond High's main campus was rebuilt and the new John F. Kennedy High School opened one mile away. In 1970, Ells reopened as a four-year high school, but by then had lost part of its student base, its Eagle mascot and red-and-white school colors to the new Kennedy High School. The reopened Harry Ells returned with new colors of purple and white and new mascot, the Falcon. After 15 more years as a separate high school, Ells closed forever in 1985, the result of declining enrollment and the discovery of asbestos in many of its buildings. After the Ells campus was torn down, LoVonya Dejean Middle School was built and opened on the same site in 2001. A plaque marks the place where Ells once stood, and a section of 33rd Street has been named Harry Ells Place.

After graduating its first four-year high school class in 1958, Ells rapidly achieved prominence on several fronts. For example, its marching band was selected to play at the opening ceremonies at the 1960 Winter Olympics, held in Squaw Valley, Lake Tahoe, CA; the Ells basketball team won the prestigious Northern California Tournament of Champions in 1964 and placed three players on the All-Tournament Team, and debate and forensics teams excelled in regional and state competitions throughout the decade of the 1960s, earning Ells a National Award for Excellence in Speech for the years 1961–1967 from the National Forensics League.

The photo of the school below is from the 1954 yearbook. The map of the location below is from the 1960 student handbook.

Harry Ells Jr High School 1954

== Notable alumni ==
- Benny Barnes (born 1951), class of 1968 who graduated from Kennedy High School; cornerback for the Stanford University Cardinal and the Dallas Cowboys
- Kent N. Brown (born 1944), class of 1961, U.S. Ambassador to the Republic of Georgia
- Charles O. Cecil, class of 1958, U.S. Ambassador to Niger and expert resource to commissions and government agencies on issues in Africa and the Middle East [U.S. Department of State, Office of the Historian, 2001].
- Gene Clines (born 1946), class of 1966, outfielder for four major league baseball teams.
- Dedy Cooper (born 1956), class of 1975, led Ells to the 1975 team championship at the CIF California State Meet.
- Susan Davis (born 1944), class of 1961, congresswoman representing California's 53rd District from 2001 to 2020
- Robert DeVee, class of 1959, painter
- James Dietz, (born 1946), class of 1964, painter of aviation, combat and military subjects
- Cherie (Keane) Ewing, class of 1960, actress, singer, and dancer
- Carl Franklin (born 1949), class of 1967, film and television actor, writer and director
- Bob Gaillard, class of 1958, head basketball coach at the University of San Francisco
- Shirley Ann Lopez, class of 1964 graduate, singer
- Willie McGee (born 1958), class of 1976) outfielder for four major league baseball teams and National League Most Valuable Player Award winner in 1985
- Doug McKechnie, class of 1959, a film and theater music composer and Oscar nominee and part of an Oscare winning team Doug McKechnie | Composer, Actor, Producer
- Patricia McKinley, class of 1967, presiding judge of the Bay Municipal Court (California)
- Eddie Miller (born 1957), class of 1975, outfielder for four major league baseball teams
- Eleanor (Alpert) Palk, class of 1959, judge and commissioner of the Orange County Superior Court
- Andre Patterson (born 1960), head football coach at California Polytechnic State University, defensive line coach for five National Football League teams, and co-defensive coordinator for the Minnesota Vikings
- Joel Peterson, class of 1965, founder of Ravenswood Winery
- Ron Theobald (1943–2016), class of 1961, secondbaseman for the Milwaukee Brewers.
- Jim Williams (born 1947) class of 1965, outfielder for the San Diego Padres
- Travis Williams (1946–1991), class of 1963, running back for Arizona State University and the Green Bay Packers
- Marilyn (Mimi) Wirth, class of 1963, painter and illustrator

== See also ==
- List of closed secondary schools in California
