= Charles Warren (California politician) =

American lawyer and politician (1927–2019)

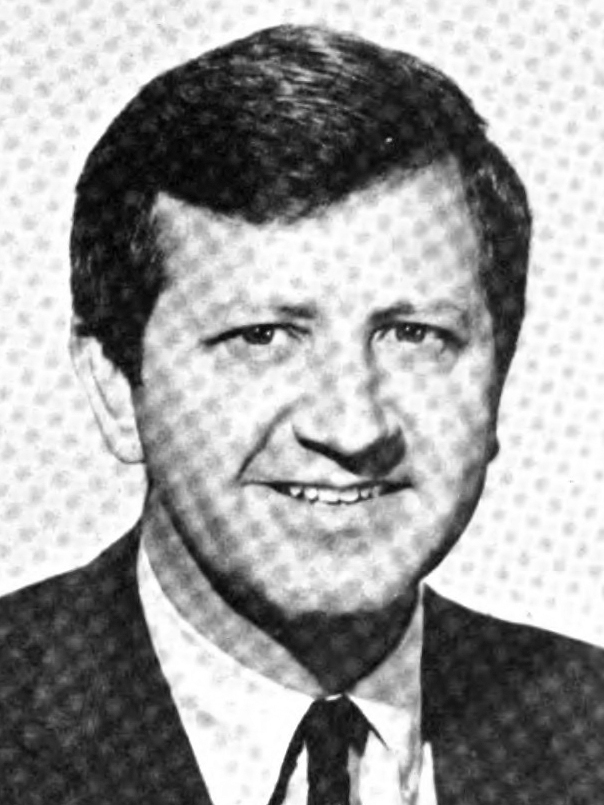
- Official portrait, 1971

Chair of the Council on Environmental Quality
- In office 1977–1979
- President: Jimmy Carter
- Preceded by: John A. Busterud
- Succeeded by: Gus Speth

Member of the California Assembly
- In office January 7, 1963 – March 11, 1977
- Preceded by: Chet Wolfrum
- Succeeded by: Mike Roos
- Constituency: 56th district (1963–1975); 46th district (1975–1977)

Personal details
- Born: Charles Hugh Warren; April 26, 1927 Kansas City, Missouri, U.S.
- Died: November 7, 2019 (aged 92)
- Party: Democratic
- Education: University of Minnesota (attended); University of California, Berkeley (BA); University of California, Hastings (JD)

Military service
- Branch/service: United States Army
- Years of service: 1944–1946
- Unit: 35th Infantry Regiment; 25th Infantry Division
- Battles/wars: World War II

Charles Hugh Warren (April 26, 1927 – November 7, 2019) was an American lawyer and Democratic politician who served in the California State Assembly from 1963 to 1977 and held a Cabinet-level position as chairman of the Council on Environmental Quality (CEQ) under U.S. President Jimmy Carter from 1977 to 1979.

In the California State Assembly, Warren became a strong proponent of environmental initiatives. He was one of the principal authors of the Coastal Protection Act, which established the California Coastal Commission as a permanent body, and the bill that created the California Energy Commission. At CEQ, he oversaw the promulgation of legally binding regulations for federal agency compliance with the National Environmental Policy Act requirement for environmental impact statements.

== Early life, education, and military service ==
Warren was born in 1927 in Kansas City, Missouri, and spent most of his childhood there and in Kansas City, Kansas. When he was a young child, the family moved to Kansas City, Kansas, where he started elementary school, finishing elementary school in Kansas City, Missouri, after his family returned there. He attended Benton High School in St. Joseph, Missouri, where his family lived for about 1 1/2 years, then returned to Kansas City, Missouri, where he graduated from Paseo High School in 1942 at age 15, having skipped two grades during his early education. Too young to join the United States military, which was absorbing the majority of male high school graduates in that World War II year, he took a job in North Kansas City with Standard Steel Works, a steel fabricating company that was manufacturing equipment for the military.

While he was working at the steel company, Warren began attending night school at a junior college in Kansas City, then enlisted in the military in the Army Specialized Training Program. As an Army trainee he was enrolled in an accelerated engineering program at Kansas State University. After doing well academically there, he was accepted into a military training program in Japanese language and area studies that was being conducted at Yale University. He completed that program shortly after his 18th birthday, having spent four-quarters at Yale. As an 18-year-old in the summer of 1945, he began basic training at Camp Roberts in California. His military training was cut short after Japan's surrender ended the war. The Army then sent him to the University of Minnesota to continue his studies of Japan and its language. After three months in Minnesota, he was sent to Japan, where he spent the final year of his U.S. Army service.

Warren was discharged from the Army in November 1946. He then enrolled as an undergraduate student at the University of California, Berkeley. After graduating, he went to law school at Hastings College of Law in San Francisco.

== Career in government and law ==
As a student in the Bay Area, Warren developed an interest in politics. He joined the San Francisco Young Democrats, serving as its chairman at one time, and helped to organize the California Democratic Council. After law school, Warren was admitted to the bar and joined a San Francisco law firm that represented labor unions. After some time there, he moved to Los Angeles, where he went to work for a larger law firm. In Los Angeles, he decided to focus his attention on his legal work and stayed out of politics for several years. He became engaged in electoral politics in 1961 after Democratic political operative Dick Tuck, who knew Warren from his political activity in San Francisco, encouraged him to become a candidate for a Republican-held California State Assembly seat in a Los Angeles County district.

=== California State Assembly ===
In 1962, Warren ran for office in the 56th Assembly District, first winning the Democratic primary and then defeating incumbent Chet Wolfrum in the general election, becoming the only Democrat to beat an incumbent in that year's California legislative election. He was to serve 14 years in the California State Assembly, from 1963 through 1977. The district he represented included the areas of Hollywood and Wilshire; after redistricting it was renumbered, becoming the 46th Assembly District.

In the Assembly, Warren became known as a strong proponent of environmental initiatives, but environment was not among his main interests at first. As the representative of an urban area, his initial legislative focus areas included fair housing, other civil rights matters, and transportation. Air quality was also a concern for his district, where smog was a problem. Early in his legislative career, he was the Assembly's representative to the Governor's Advisory Commission on the Status of Women. That experience led to his becoming author of several bills aimed at ensuring pay equity between men and women performing the same jobs. Four years of effort led to the successful enactment of one of his bills, AB 22.

He initiated and developed the first U.S. statewide 9-1-1 emergency telephone service program. Warren's efforts led to Governor Ronald Reagan being persuaded to impose a 0.5% surcharge on telephone bills to fund the program, in spite of having promised not to raise taxes. Reagan signed the authorizing legislation, known as the Warren – 911 – Emergency Assistance Act, into law in 1973. The state system, which cost some $137 million and took more than a decade to implement, was scheduled to be completed in 1985.

In 1973, Warren was chairman of a State Assembly subcommittee charged with addressing issues of future energy demand in California. In that role, he developed what he described as a "consuming interest" in the topic of energy. This led him to draft AB 1575, an innovative bill that proposed creating a new state energy agency to make independent forecasts of electricity demand, enforce energy conservation, and encourage the development of alternative forms of energy. A modified version of the legislation passed in both houses of the legislature, but Governor Ronald Reagan vetoed it. Just days after the veto, the start of the Yom Kippur War in the Middle East led to the Organization of Petroleum Exporting Countries (OPEC) imposing an oil embargo that created the 1973 oil crisis. The oil crisis caused Reagan and his staff to recognize the need to reexamine government energy policies.

Warren's bill AB 1575, known as the Warren-Alquist Act, was enacted in May 1974. It established the State Energy Resources Conservation and Development Commission, later known as the California Energy Commission. In later years, Warren described the law as the "first successful effort by any [U.S.] governmental jurisdiction to deal with the energy problem in any of its aspects." Following the law's passage, the National Conference of State Legislators established a committee on energy policy and Warren became its first chairman.

Warren was one of the principal authors of the Coastal Protection Act of 1976, which established the California Coastal Commission as a permanent body upon the expiration of the four-year authorization for the Coastal Commission created by Proposition 20 in 1972.

Reminiscing during oral history interviews in the 1980s, Warren commented on his unexpected status as a successful environmental leader:

Among a small circle, I became a minor celebrity and received credit which I did not deserve for things which I did not fully understand. I was considered an environmentalist, but I'm not sure I was deserving. Certainly I had environmental concerns, but I'd given such concerns only limited thought and attention.

=== Democratic Central Committee ===
In 1966, Warren took on a party leadership role, serving as chairman of California's Democratic Central Committee. He held that position until 1968.

=== Council on Environmental Quality ===
He was the third chairman of the Council on Environmental Quality (CEQ), appointed to the position by President Jimmy Carter, and serving from January 1977 to September 1979. He brought attorney Nicholas Yost from California to Washington, DC, to serve as chief counsel at CEQ. During their leadership at CEQ (Yost was at CEQ from 1977 to 1981), CEQ promulgated legally binding regulations for federal agency compliance with the National Environmental Policy Act (NEPA) requirement that environmental impact statements be prepared for "major federal actions." The new regulations, at 40 Code of Federal Regulations 1500–1508, replaced earlier CEQ guidelines. They were published in 1978 and took effect in 1979. The regulations, which were designed to resolve problems that had been identified in the early years of implementing the requirements of NEPA, were well received. They remain in force as of 2012, having had only one amendment to one subsection over the years since their adoption.

Warren left CEQ in 1979 to return to California for "personal and family reasons". He joined the faculty of the University of California, Davis.

=== Later career ===
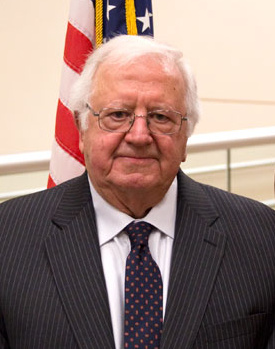
Warren in 2015.

In 1985, State Assembly Speaker Willie Brown appointed Warren to a two-year term on the California Coastal Commission. In January 1986 he was an unsuccessful candidate for the Commission's chairmanship, losing to fellow Democrat Michael Wornum by a vote of 8–4. Warren and Wornum were among the minority of Commission members who generally sided with environmentalists by voting to restrict destructive coastal development, while the majority of commissioners who generally opposed limits on development. In 1987 the Los Angeles Times quoted Warren's comments on the political nature of the Coastal Commission's decisionmaking:

The citizen interest groups have kind of disappeared, ...so you have ... political appointees with agendas of their own, meeting in the basement of some hotel, deciding multimillion-dollar issues.... It's kind of tempting to think that nobody gives a damn and so you do whatever you want.

In 1989, Warren was appointed executive officer of the California State Lands Commission. In 1993, while working as executive director of the Lands Commission, Warren encouraged Mobil to pursue a proposal to use land-based horizontal drilling to access offshore oil near Santa Barbara. The proposal, known as the "Clearview project", was opposed by environmentalists. It required approval from the University of California, Santa Barbara, which owned the drilling site. In 1995, the university refused to grant permission for drilling, citing incompatibility with nearby land uses. Mobil abandoned the project the following year.

== Personal life ==
Charles Warren married Audrey Paul in 1963. He is the father of three children.

Political offices
Preceded by John A. Busterud	Chair of the Council on Environmental Quality; 1977–1979	Succeeded by Gus Speth
