= Leonard M. Landsborough =

American agriculturist and politician

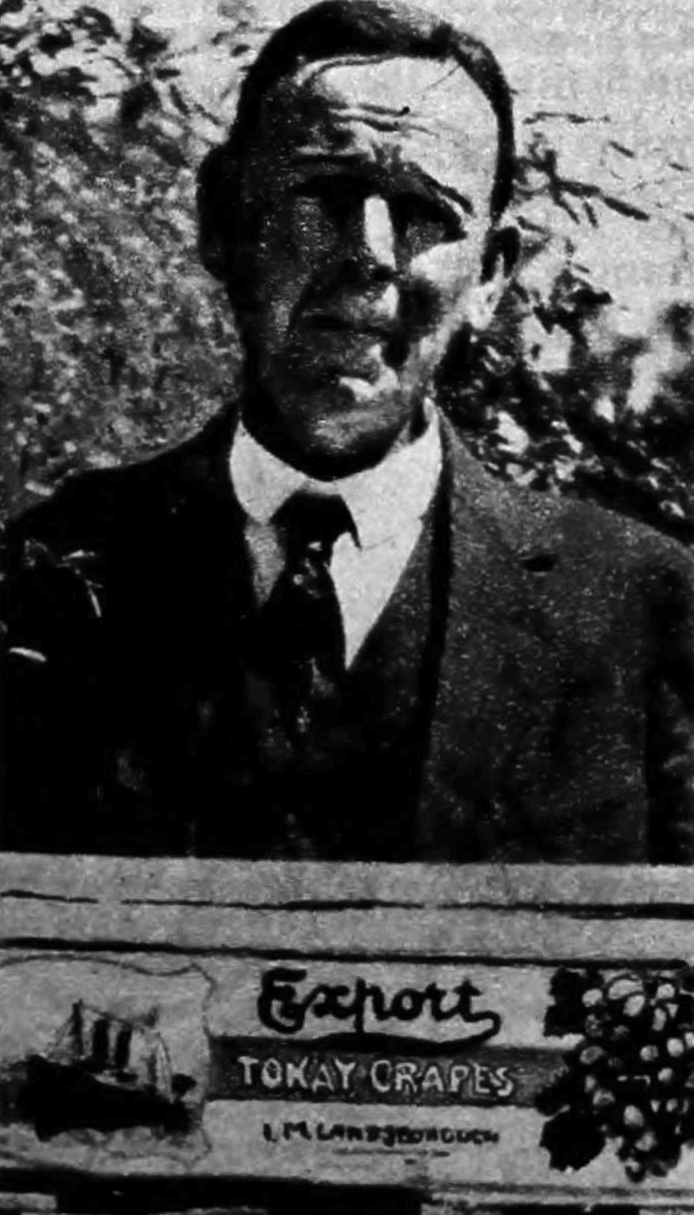
- Landsborough c. 1923

Member of the California State Assembly from the 22nd district
- In office January 4, 1897 - January 2, 1899
- Preceded by: John E. Butler
- Succeeded by: Morris Brooke

Personal details
- Born: Leonard Monduran Landsborough; August 7, 1857 Wide Bay–Burnett, Colony of New South Wales
- Died: March 14, 1927 (aged 69) Sacramento, California, United States
- Party: Fusion
- Occupation: Agriculturist, politician

Leonard Monduran Landsborough (August 7, 1857 – March 14, 1927) was an American agriculturist in the Florin, California, area and a member of the California State Assembly for the 22nd district. A member of the Populist Party and then a Democrat, he was active in a movement to protect the rights of Japanese farmers in the Sacramento Valley. He resigned from the Assembly after being indicted for malfeasance while he had been a Sacramento County employee, but was acquitted of all charges.

== Biography ==
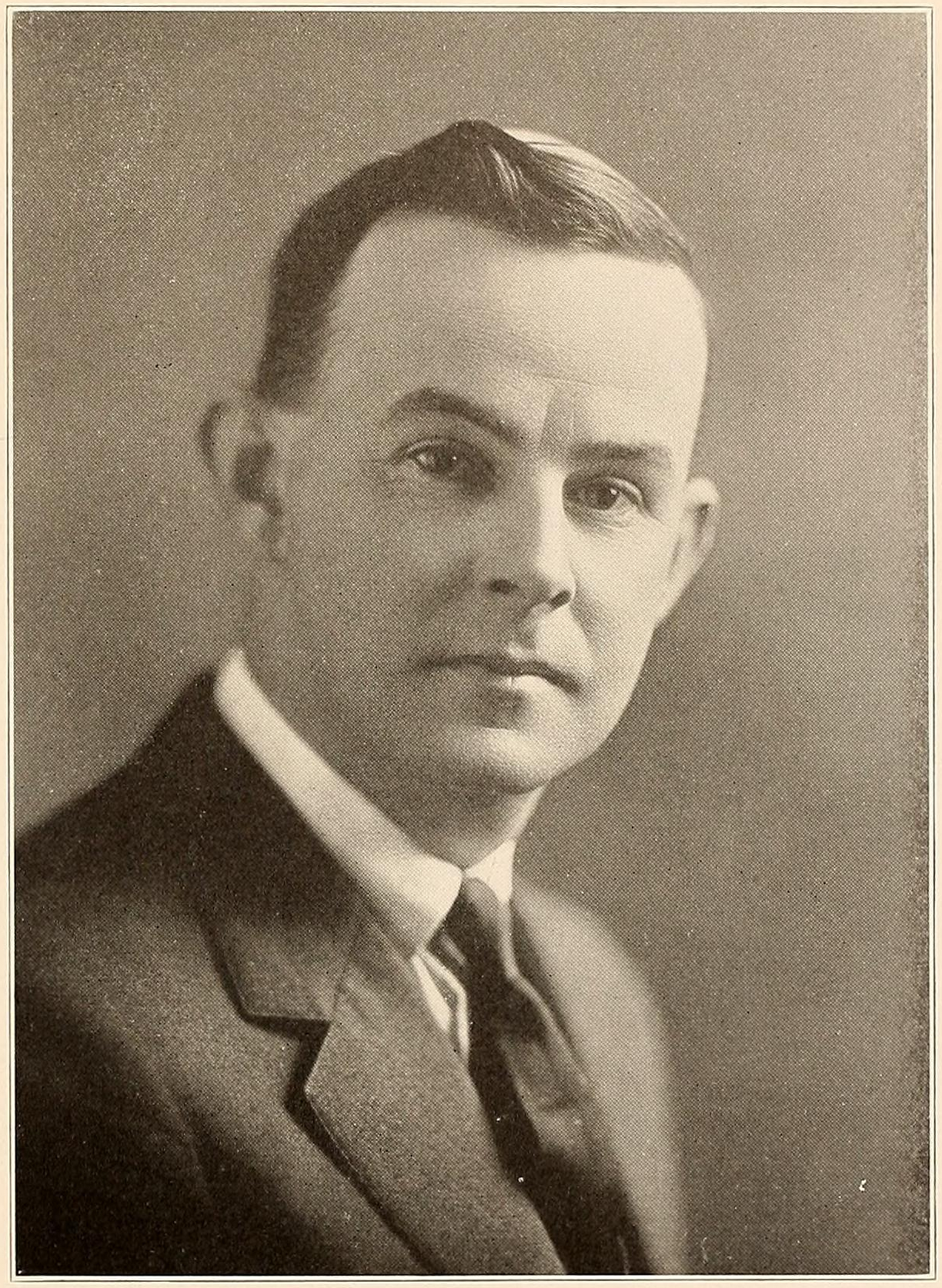
Landsborough's son Leonard c. 1923

Landsborough was born in Queensland, Australia, to British parents James Landsborough from Stevenston, Ayrshire, Scotland, and Georgiana Sothers from Liverpool, England. Landsborough moved to the United States in 1868.

He married Californian Agnes Ethel Rutter, the daughter of James Rutter, a pioneer settler in the Sacramento Valley who was known for the quality of the grapes from his vineyards. There were five children, Thomas R., Amy L., Leonard B., Lloyd and Georgie B.

Landsborough testified in favor of Japanese farmers in California, who were being threatened with legal penalties and, as alien Japanese, were not legally able to own property in the state. To get around this stricture, he told a U.S. Congressional investigative committee in 1920, he had been "purchasing land in his own name" and pledging to hand it over to the U.S.-born children of the immigrants when they became adults. He was a member of the American Committee of Justice, which worked against Initiative 1, the Alien Land Law, on the November 2, 1920, California ballot.

Landsborough died in Sacramento on March 14, 1927, at the age of 69.

== Public life ==
Landsborough was appointed deputy county clerk about 1892 by Sacramento County Clerk W.B. Hamilton, "and since that time he has been one of the most trusted employes in the service of the county." He was active in Populist politics and in 1894 received the Populist nomination for clerk of the California Supreme Court.

In October 1893, Landsborough was elected adjutant of a temporary committee chosen to form a California State unit of the Industrial Legion of the United States organized by "prominent leaders of the People's Party who are also prominent in the Farmers' Alliance." It was to be "modeled much after the Grand Army [of the Republic] and partakes of a secret organization character." He was also a member of the state executive committee of the Farmers Alliance.

Three years later, in August 1896, the Democrats and the Populists of Sacramento County formed a fusion ticket to contest the state and county elections. Landsborough was chosen to run for the Assembly in the 22nd District, and he won the November general election by 1,272 votes to 1,074 for William Lovdal, the Republican candidate.

Just the next month, though, the news broke that Landsborough had been skimming money from men who had been summoned for jury duty while he was a deputy county clerk. He did this by raising the figure of their jury pay and pocketing the difference in cooperation with a money lender, F.C. Hyde. Landsborough made a full confession to the county clerk, and repaid the money, $143.50, but later he was indicted by a grand jury and was charged with forgery and fraudulent conduct. Upon trial the next May, he was acquitted of the charges, with the jury being out "but a few minutes."

Landsborough took part in the state convention of the Democratic Party in Sacramento in September 1902, and in April 1910 he ran for a seat "for trustees of the high school."
