= Training Wheels for Citizenship =

Training Wheels for Citizenship was a youth suffrage proposal by California Democratic state senator John Vasconcellos to give 14-year-olds one-quarter of a vote and 16-year-olds one-half of a vote, with 18-year-olds continuing to have a full vote as under the current system. It would have applied only in state elections. Vasconellos' rationale for the graduated system was that he did not think that the legislature would approve full voting rights; however, he said "in my heart I think 16-year-olds should be given a full vote."

== Arguments for and against ==
=== Arguments for ===
Vasconellos said, "We have apprenticeships in medicine, journalism, plumbing, and car driving, why not politics?" and argued that teenagers have more exposure to current events via the media and Internet. Attorney Richard Perr countered the argument that 14-year-olds lack experience by saying that the "same argument could be made for many adults, who are automatically given the right to vote when they turn 18." The amendment was promoted as a means of increasing voter turnout by allowing youth to get in the habit of voting before leaving high school.

=== Arguments against ===
The plan was criticized as promoting "representation without taxation." Republican Assemblyman Ray Haynes said, "There's a reason 14-year-olds and 16-year-olds don't vote. They are not adults. They are not mature enough. They are easily deceived by political charlatans." Republican State Senator Ross Johnson said, "To waste taxpayer money having children cast votes would be ridiculous at any time, but in the face of our current fiscal crisis, it's an obscenity." The historical basis for the Twenty-sixth Amendment to the United States Constitution, which lowered the voting age from 21 to 18, was that 18-year-olds were being drafted to fight in the Vietnam War; the argument was made that no such compelling reason exists for lowering the voting age to 14 or 16.

Some supporters of youth suffrage felt that voting should be all-or-nothing; for instance, 15-year-old Elliot Aglioni, a member of Berkeley High School's Progressive Club said, "We're just as much of a person as someone who's 18." The use of fractional votes was also compared to the Three-fifths Compromise under which slaves were counted as three-fifths of a person for U.S. Census enumeration purposes prior to slavery's abolition in 1865. Another criticism was that the sliding scale went against the principle of one person, one vote. Some opponents worried that it would violate the Equal Protection Clause of the Fourteenth Amendment and be complicated to implement logistically. Counsel for the California Legislature opined, "because the fundamental right to vote is implicated by SCA 19, a court would likely apply the strict scrutiny standard in determining whether the granting of only a fractional vote to a voter under the age of 18, or the differential treatment of classes of voters under the age of 18, would violate the equal protection clause and, pursuant to that standard, that the state would have to demonstrate, with a strong basis in evidence, that imposing those limitations is necessary to achieve a compelling state interest." The bill was mocked by commentators who joked, "They could have half a beer too or something like that."

The Daily Show's producers invited Sen. Vasconcellos and Sacramento County Registrar Jill LaVine to be interviewed by Rob Corddry, who asked, "Do you ever think of counting blacks as more than one vote to make up for that whole slavery thing? P. Diddy's got to be worth two votes, and Justin Timberlake, he's worth two votes, even though he's not black or anything." LaVine responded, "But that's really not the point we're making here."

== Outcome ==
The bill, SB 1606, made national news when the Senate Committee on Elections and Reappointment approved it on May 5, 2004 and referred it to the Senate Rules Committee. SB 1606 was to remain inactive unless the parallel bill, SCA 19, passed. SCA 19 was also passed by the Senate Committee on Elections and Reapportionment on May 5, and referred to the Committee on Constitutional Amendments. On June 23, that committee passed it and referred it to the Committee on Appropriations, where it failed by a 3-5 vote on August 12.

== See also ==
- Electoral reform in California
