= Chet Wolfrum =

American politician (1910–1973)

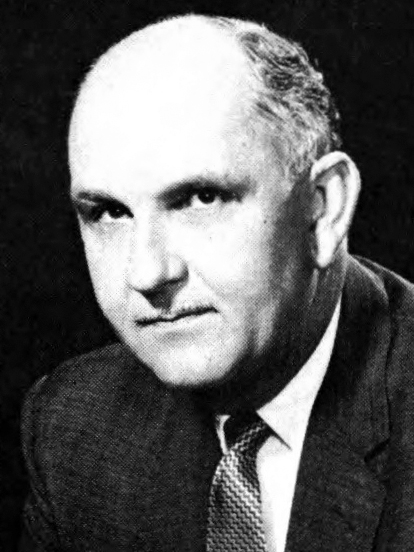
- Official portrait, 1961

Member of the California State Assembly from the 56th district
- In office December 2, 1959 – January 7, 1963
- Preceded by: Seth J. Johnson
- Succeeded by: Charles Warren

Personal details
- Born: June 4, 1910 St. Paul, Minnesota, U.S.
- Died: December 20, 1973 (aged 63) Los Angeles, California, U.S.
- Party: Republican
- Spouse: Esther K. Fritzler (m. 1931; died 1971)
- Children: Chester E. C. Wolfrun

Chester Emmette "Chet" Wolfrum (June 4, 1910 – December 20, 1973). was an American politician who served in the California State Assembly from 1959 to 1961. He represented the 56th Assembly District, in Los Angeles County.

Wolfrum was born in St. Paul, Minnesota, on June 4, 1910.

A Republican, he entered the State Assembly after winning a special election held October 20, 1959, to fill a vacancy created by the death of Assemblyman Seth J. Johnson. One of five candidates, he won election with 49.7% of the vote. He won re-election in November 1960. In 1962, after redistricting changed the composition of the district, he lost his seat to Democrat Charles Warren.
