= California Counts =

California Counts was an organization and campaign based in Sacramento, California, United States, advocating electoral reform in that state. The organization's focus was securing a statewide initiative in June 2008, specifying that California's 55 electoral votes be divided up not on a statewide basis, but on the basis of the state's individual congressional districts.

Signature gatherers worked to collect the 434,000 signatures necessary in order to get the initiative on the ballot. As of December 1, 2007, organizers failed to raise $2 million for petition circulators and their target of 700,000 signatures to allow leeway for disqualified signatures. The initiative did appear on the June 2008 California direct primary election ballot to affect the 2008 presidential elections because of lack of funding and time.

== Motivation ==
According to The Independent newspaper, the campaign, while being presented to California voters as a populist issue, in actuality is being engineered to assist the Republican Party in winning the United States presidency in 2008 by giving the Republican candidate 20 more electoral votes. Nearly all the individuals and organizations listed in the "Endorsements" section of the California Counts official website are affiliated with the Republican Party.

== Organizers ==
The campaign was organized by Charles "Chep" Hurth III, a Republican donor to Rudolph Giuliani, and drafted by Tom Hiltachk, a Republican attorney. The campaign's signature drive was organized by Kevin Eckery, a Republican consultant and Mike Arno of Arno Political Consultants, which has been criticized for its reputation for misleading voters. The campaign manager is Dave Gilliard, a Republican consultant with close ties to Issa.

== Funding ==
The largest donor to the campaign (having donated $175,000) is Paul Singer, a Republican billionaire and one of the largest donors to the presidential campaign of Rudolph Giuliani. A complaint was filed with the Federal Election Commission alleging that financial supporters of presidential candidate Rudolph Giuliani, such as Paul Singer, violated federal regulations by supporting the initiative. Singer has also been criticized for the circuitous route his donation took—through a Missouri attorney and a hitherto-unknown corporation—to evade detection of rule violations. Its chief fundraiser is Anne Dunsmore, who took her post directly after leaving her job as national deputy campaign manager for Giuliani. The California Republican Party has contributed US$80,000 toward the campaign, and U.S. Representative Darrell Issa (also a Republican) contributed just under US$60,000. By early November 2007, California Counts reported having collected US$540,000.

== Questionable methods ==
California Counts and Arno Political Consultants, the Sacramento-based firm working for campaign manager Dave Gilliard, have been accused of deploying deceptive tactics in their attempt to acquire signatures. In one instance, petitioners for "children with cancer" at the University of California, Santa Barbara were recorded on videotape to be gathering signatures for California Counts. In a November 1, 2007 news conference, state Democratic Party chair Art Torres also asserted that a deceptive petition had been circulated during an October 27, 2007 anti-war demonstration under the guise of a call to end all war funding. Art Torres and Kristina Wilfore, former head of the Washington-based Ballot Initiative Strategy Center (BISC), asked California Attorney General Jerry Brown to scrutinize whether Arno violated state law in deceiving voters into signing the petition.
