= John F. McCarthy =

American politician

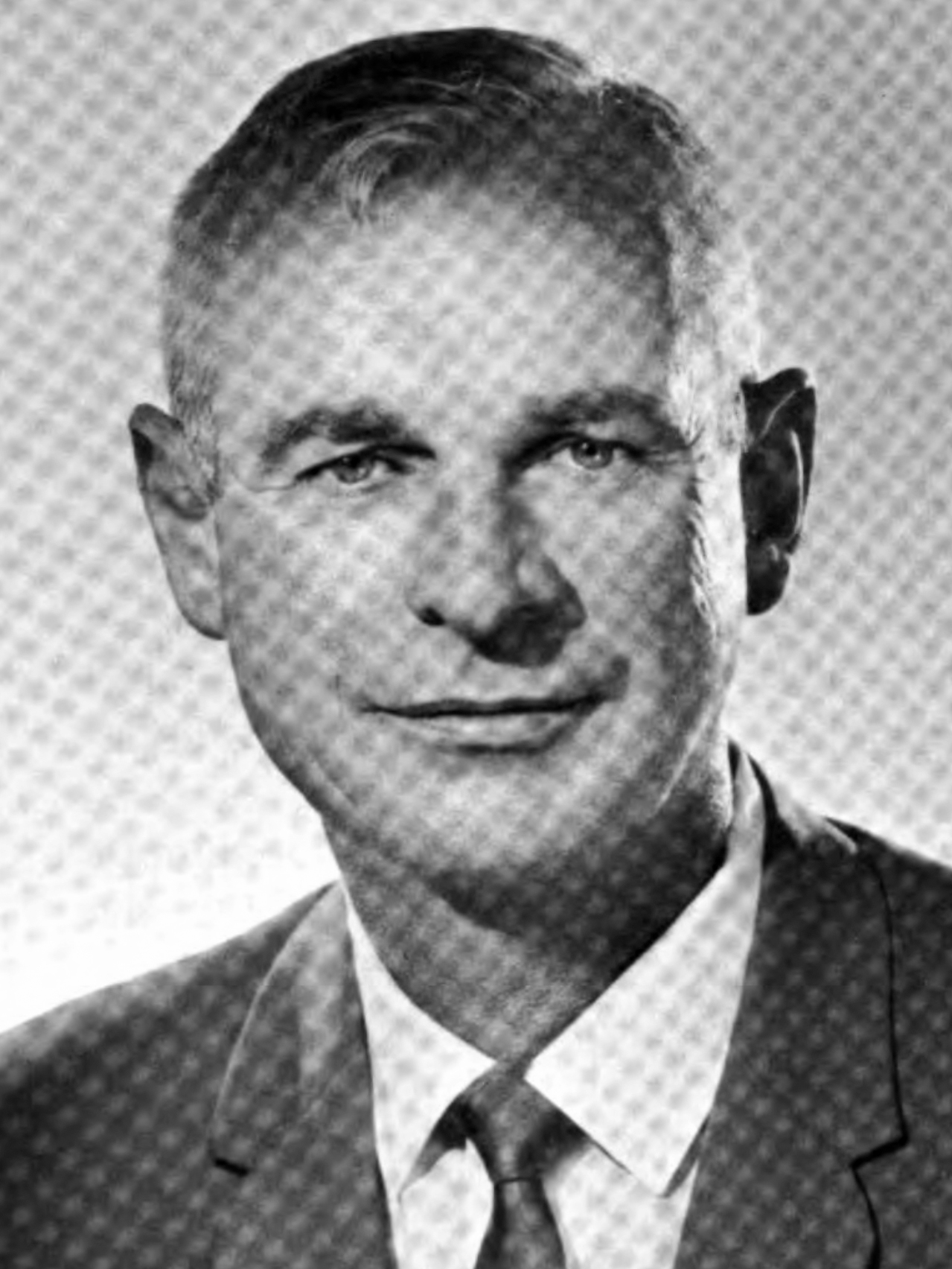
- Official portrait, 1967

Member of the California State Senate
- In office November 13, 1950 – January 4, 1971
- Preceded by: Thomas F. Keating
- Succeeded by: Peter H. Behr
- Constituency: 13th district (1950–1967); 4th district (1967–1971)

Personal details
- Born: John Francis McCarthy; February 18, 1924 San Francisco, California, U.S.
- Died: February 21, 1981 (aged 57) Sea Ranch, California, U.S.
- Party: Republican
- Spouse: Ursula Mulligans
- Children: 7
- Relatives: Robert I. McCarthy (brother)
- Education: University of San Francisco

Military service
- Allegiance: United States
- Branch/service: U.S. Merchant Marine
- Battles/wars: World War II

John Francis McCarthy (February 18, 1924 – February 21, 1981) was an American politician who was a Republican member of the California State Senate from 1950 to 1971.

== Life ==
McCarthy was born on February 18, 1924, in San Francisco. His elder brother Robert served in the State Assembly from 1948 to 1952 and Senate from 1954 to 1958.

Before he was in California's legislature, he was a merchant marine during the Second World War. He entered office in 1950 as a nonpartisan senator before turning Republican in 1952. He was the Senate's Minority Leader from 1967 until his retirement in 1971. During his tenure, he created and passed a bill for the formation of the Bay Area Rapid Transit (BART) in 1957. He was a strong advocate of free speech, and believed that a university is like a fourth branch of government.

A lifelong resident of the San Francisco Bay Area, McCarthy represented State Senate District 13 from 1951 to 1967, and District 4 in his final term (1967–1971). He had 7 children. He died in the suburb of Tiburon.

The Richmond-San Rafael Bridge was named in his honor.
