= John Vasconcellos =

American politician

John Vasconcellos ComIH
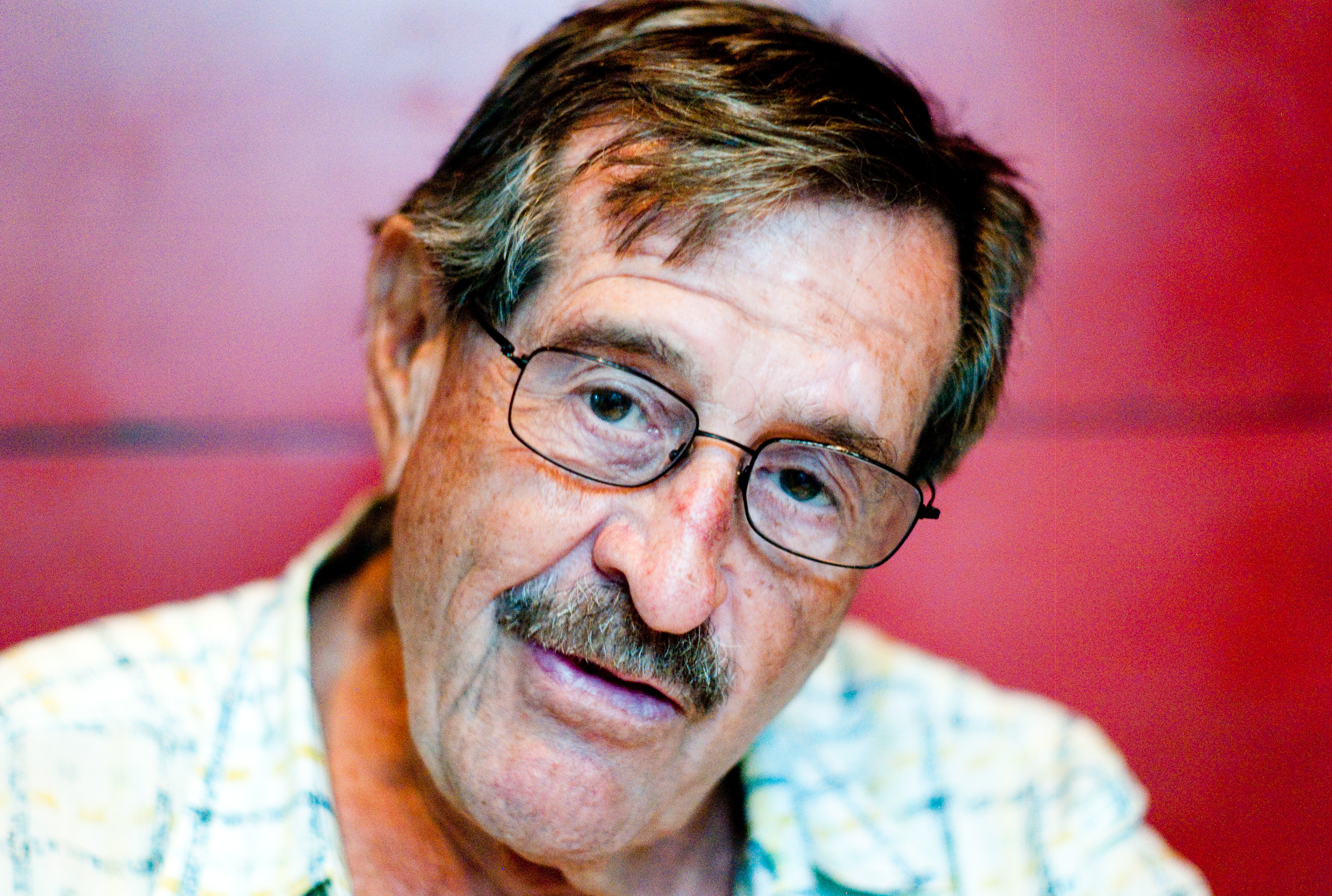

Member of the California Senate from the 13th district
- In office December 2, 1996 – November 30, 2004
- Preceded by: Al Alquist
- Succeeded by: Elaine Alquist

Member of the California State Assembly
- In office January 2, 1967 – November 30, 1996
- Preceded by: Al Alquist
- Succeeded by: Elaine Alquist
- Constituency: 24th district (1967–1974); 23rd district (1974–1992); 22nd district (1992–1996)

Personal details
- Born: May 11, 1932 San Jose, California
- Died: May 24, 2014 (aged 82) San Jose, California
- Party: Democratic
- Education: Bellarmine College Preparatory and Santa Clara University
- Occupation: Lawyer

John Bernard Vasconcellos Jr. ComIH (May 11, 1932 – May 24, 2014) was an American politician from California and member of the Democratic Party. He represented Silicon Valley as a member of the California State Assembly for 30 years and a California State Senator for 8 years. His lifelong interest in psychology led to his advocacy of the self-esteem movement in California politics.

== Early life ==
Vasconcellos came from Portuguese (paternal) and German (maternal) roots. He graduated from Bellarmine College Preparatory and Santa Clara University. After graduating magna cum laude and valedictorian of his class from Santa Clara, Vasconcellos spent two years as a lieutenant in the United States Army, serving in West Germany. Upon his return, he reenrolled in SCU, obtaining a law degree in 1959. He joined the law firm of Ruffo & Chadwick; after a year, he joined the staff of Governor Pat Brown for one year before returning to the firm.

== Career ==
In 1966, Vasconcellos ran for and won a seat in the California State Assembly, taking office January 2, 1967. (Legislative sessions since 1972 have begun on the first Monday in December of even-numbered years.) By 1980 he was one of the longest serving members of the Assembly, second only to Speaker Willie Brown. Due to the Assembly's policy of awarding leadership positions based on seniority, he became the chairman of the Assembly Ways and Means Committee, one of the most powerful assignments in the California Legislature. Vasconcellos proposed the State Task Force to Promote Self-Esteem in October 1986. In 1989, Brown appointed Vasconcellos to chair the Select Assembly Committee on Ethics. Vasconcellos held the positions until he was forced out of the Assembly in 1996 by term limits.

He then ran for, and won, a seat in the California State Senate, again representing Silicon Valley. In the State Senate, he chaired the Public Safety, Education, and Economic Development committees. Vasconcellos served two terms in the State Senate, again forced to retire by term limits.

Throughout his long public career Vasconcellos worked to illuminate the link between personal psychology and politics.

In March 2004, Vasconcellos introduced Senate Bill 1606, known as Training Wheels for Citizenship, which would allow people 14 or older to vote. The votes of 14- and 15-year-olds would count as a quarter of a vote, and of 16- and 17-year-olds a half. The National Youth Rights Association supported the bill, but Republican legislators criticized it. Bob Stern, president of the Center for Governmental Studies, compared this bill's fractional vote to the policy of the Three-Fifths Compromise, which gave slaves three-fifths representation in the early history of the U.S. Vasconcellos abandoned the bill after it fell one vote short in the final committee.

Vasconcellos was also a leading champion of medical marijuana. In 1995, he sponsored AB 1529, a bill to legalize personal possession and cultivation of marijuana for medical use. The bill was vetoed by Gov. Wilson, but provided the blueprint for California's pioneering medical marijuana initiative, Proposition 215. He went on to sponsor the California Research Act of 1999 (SB 847), which established the California Center for Medicinal Cannabis Research at U.C. San Diego, and the Medical Marijuana Program Act of 2004 (SB 420), which created a state ID card system for medical marijuana patients and authorized the distribution and cultivation of medical marijuana by patient collectives or cooperatives, laying the groundwork for the legal establishment of California's many medical marijuana clubs and dispensaries.

=== Later career ===
After representing the Silicon Valley for 38 years in the California Legislature, Vasconcellos retired on November 30, 2004. In order to carry forward the vision and leadership of Vasconcellos' politics, friends and colleagues created The Vasconcellos Project. As its first initiative, The Vasconcellos Project launched the Politics of Trust Network (PTN), a civic engagement enterprise that seeks to become a prime mover in advancing this new vision and practice of politics.

Vasconcellos had the second-longest career of an elected state legislator in California history (after Ralph C. Dills of southern California) and the longest in terms of continuous service. He was known for his work on public education and the state budget during his career in the legislature.

== Death ==
Vasconcellos died at his home in Santa Clara, California, from multiple organ failure, thirteen days after his 82nd birthday.

== Honors ==
- Commander of the Order of Prince Henry, Portugal (9 June 1997)

Preceded by Al Alquist	California State Assemblyman, 24th District; 1967–1974	Succeeded by Leona Egeland
Preceded by John Francis Foran	California State Assemblyman, 23rd District; 1974–1992	Succeeded by Dom Cortese
Preceded by Chuck Quackenbush	California State Assemblyman, 22nd District; 1992–1996	Succeeded by Elaine Alquist
Preceded by Al Alquist	California State Senator, 13th District; 1996–2004	Succeeded by Elaine Alquist
