= Gerald J. O'Gara =

American politician

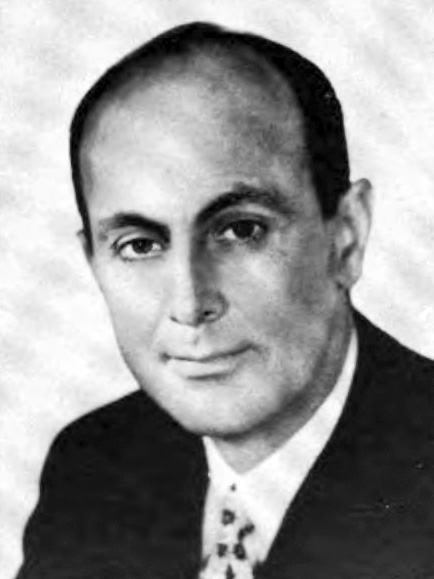
- Official portrait, 1950

Member of the California Senate from the 14th district
- In office January 6, 1947 – January 3, 1955
- Preceded by: John F. Shelley
- Succeeded by: Robert I. McCarthy

Member of the San Francisco Board of Supervisors from the at-large district
- In office January 8, 1942 – December 2, 1942
- Preceded by: John F. McGowan
- Succeeded by: James J. Gartland

Personal details
- Born: October 11, 1902 San Francisco, California, U.S.
- Died: October 7, 1989 (aged 86)
- Party: Democratic
- Spouse: Antionette Tobin (m. 1940, ?) Mary Orme Johnson (m. 1947)

Military service
- Branch/service: United States Navy
- Battles/wars: World War II

Gerald J. O'Gara (October 11, 1902 – October 7, 1989) served in the California State Senate for the 14th district from 1947 to 1955 and a member of the San Francisco Board of Supervisors. During World War II he served in the United States Navy.
