= Elaine Alquist =

American politician (1944–2024)

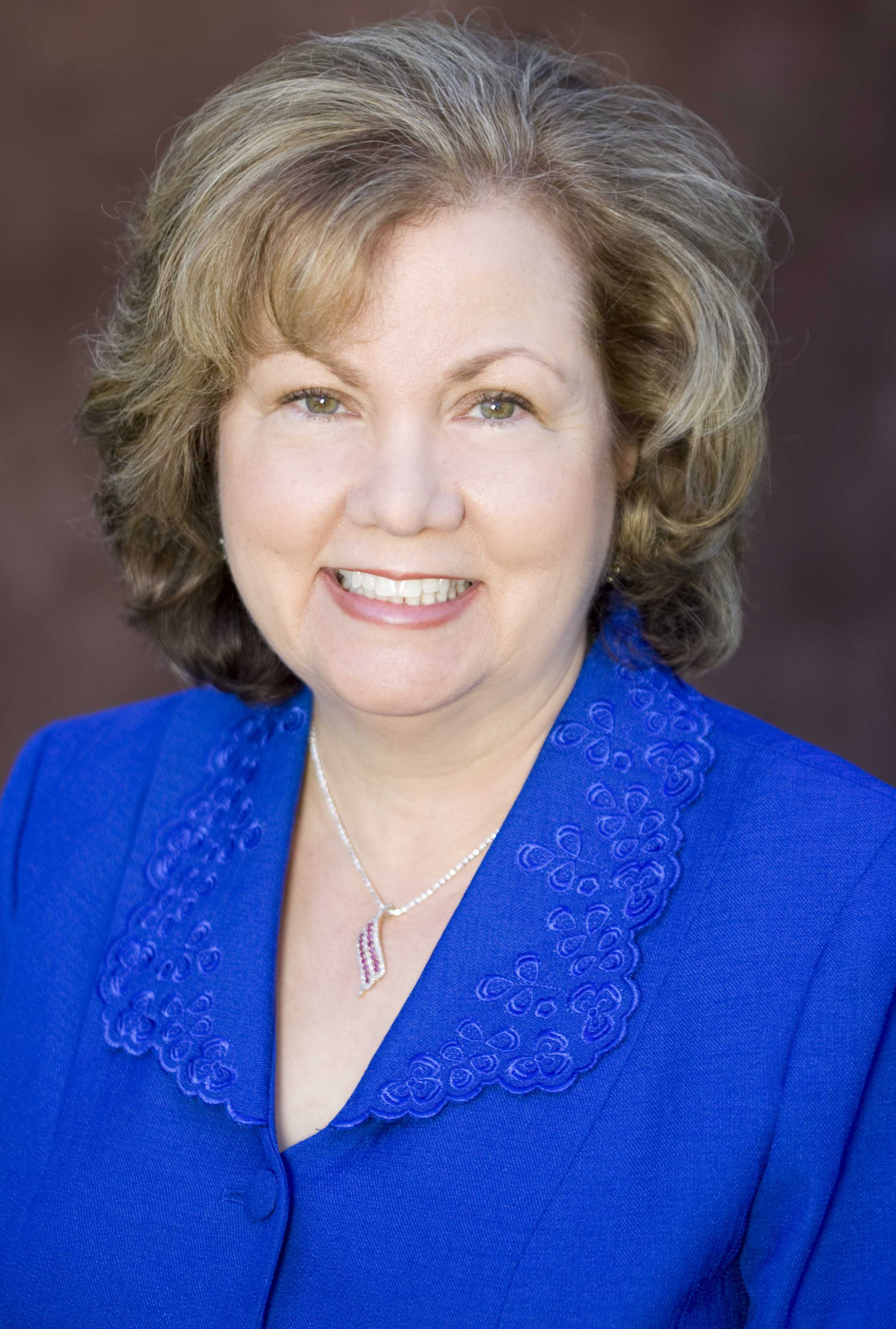
- Official portrait, 2009

Member of the California Senate from the 13th district
- In office December 6, 2004 – November 30, 2012
- Preceded by: John Vasconcellos
- Succeeded by: Jerry Hill (redistricted)

Member of the California State Assembly from the 22nd district
- In office December 2, 1996 – November 30, 2002
- Preceded by: John Vasconcellos
- Succeeded by: Sally Lieber

Personal details
- Born: August 21, 1944 (age 82) Chicago, Illinois, U.S.
- Died: July 9, 2024 (aged 79)
- Party: Democratic
- Spouse(s): Duncan Benas (engaged); Al Alquist (deceased)
- Education: Washington University in St. Louis; MacMurray College
- Occupation: School counselor Businesswoman; Real estate broker Financial analyst Teacher

Elaine Kontominas Alquist (August 21, 1944 – July 9, 2024) was a Democratic state senator from California's 13th Senate District. Prior to serving in the Senate, she served in the California State Assembly for six years.

The 13th Senate District (2001 Redistricting) was centered in Santa Clara County and included the cities of San Jose, Santa Clara, Sunnyvale, Mountain View and Gilroy.

Alquist served in the State Senate from December 2004 to November 2012. She succeeded John Vasconcellos, who himself succeeded Alquist's husband, the late Al Alquist, who represented the district for 30 years.

She died on July 9, 2024, aged 79.

== Early life and education ==
Alquist graduated with a Bachelor of Arts degree from MacMurray College in 1966 and a Master of Arts degree from Washington University in St. Louis in 1967. Her professional career began as an algebra and trigonometry teacher and a counselor in the public schools. In 1981, she served as PTA president and then beginning in 1983 served eight years as a member and then president of the board of education of the Cupertino Union School District.

== State Assembly ==
Alquist was elected to the California State Assembly's 22nd District in November 1996, and was re-elected in 1998 and 2000. Under the provisions of California's 1990 term limits law, she termed out in 2002.

== State Senate ==
Alquist was elected to the California State Senate's 13th District in November 2004, and was re-elected in 2008. She termed out in 2012.

Political offices
Preceded by John Vasconcellos	California State Assemblywoman, 22nd District; 1996–2002	Succeeded by Sally Lieber
Preceded by John Vasconcellos	California State Senator, 13th District; 2004–2012	Succeeded by Jerry Hill
