= California's 13th senatorial district =

American legislative district

California's 13th State Senate district
Current senator
Josh Becker; D–Menlo Park
- Population (2010) • Voting age • Citizen voting age: 927,480; 719,549; 553,079
- Demographics: 47.57% White; 2.57% Black; 21.85% Latino; 25.28% Asian; 0.40% Native American; 1.18% Hawaiian/Pacific Islander; 0.41% other; 0.74% remainder of multiracial
- Registered voters: 534,908
- Registration: 52.51% Democratic; 14.85% Republican; 28.55% No party preference

California's 13th senatorial district is one of 40 California State Senate districts. It is currently represented by Democrat Josh Becker of Menlo Park.

== District profile ==
The district encompasses the southern Bay Area, taking in most of San Mateo County such as the communities of South San Francisco, Pacifica, San Bruno, Millbrae, Burlingame, San Mateo, Foster City, El Granada, Hallf Moon Bay, San Carlos, Redwood City, Woodside, and Menlo Park; along with the western Santa Clara County communities of Palo Alto, Stanford, Mountain View, Cupertino, Campbell, Saratoga, and Los Gatos.

== Election results from statewide races ==
Year	Office	Results
2021	Recall	No 79.2 – 20.8%
2020	President	Biden 78.8 – 19.2%
2018	Governor	Newsom 75.5 – 24.5%
2018	Senator	Feinstein 62.5 – 37.5%
2016	President	Clinton 76.7 – 17.9%
2016	Senator	Harris 73.0 – 27.0%
2014	Governor	Brown 75.0 – 25.0%
2012	President	Obama 71.8 – 25.6%
2012	Senator	Feinstein 76.2 – 23.8%

== List of senators representing the district ==
Due to redistricting, the 13th district has been moved around different parts of the state. The current iteration resulted from the 2021 redistricting by the California Citizens Redistricting Commission.

Senators	Party	Years served	Counties represented	Notes
William Cronan	Democratic	January 8, 1883 – January 5, 1885	San Francisco	Cronan and Sullivan served together.
Frank J. Sullivan	Democratic	January 8, 1883 – January 5, 1885	San Francisco	Cronan and Sullivan served together.
John L. Boone	Republican	January 5, 1885 – January 3, 1887	San Francisco	Boone and Days served together.
John M. Days	Republican	January 5, 1885 – January 3, 1887	San Francisco	Boone and Days served together.
Findley R. Dray	Republican	January 3, 1887 – January 2, 1893	Sacramento	
Elijah Carson Hart	Republican	January 2, 1893 – January 4, 1897	Sacramento	
Gillis Doty	Democratic	January 4, 1897 – January 1, 1901	Sacramento	
Robert T. Devlin	Republican	January 1, 1901 – January 2, 1905	Sacramento	
John G. Mattos Jr.	Republican	January 2, 1905 – January 4, 1909	Alameda	
Edward Keating Strobridge	Republican	January 4, 1909 – January 8, 1917	Alameda	
Frank Monroe Carr	Republican	January 8, 1917 – January 5, 1925	Alameda	
E. H. Christian	Republican	January 5, 1925 – January 2, 1933	Alameda	
Charles F. Reindollar	Republican	January 2, 1933 – January 4, 1937	Marin	
Thomas F. Keating	Democratic	January 4, 1937 – September 15, 1950	Marin	Resigned to become a Judge for the Marin Superior Court.
Vacant		September 15, 1950 – November 13, 1950	Marin	
John F. McCarthy	Republican	November 13, 1950 – January 2, 1967	Marin	Sworn in after winning special election.
Al Alquist	Democratic	January 2, 1967 – November 30, 1976	Santa Clara	
John Garamendi	Democratic	December 6, 1976 – November 30, 1984	Alpine, Amador, Calaveras, El Dorado, Mono, Sacramento, San Joaquin, Stanislaus, Tuolumne	
Al Alquist	Democratic	December 3, 1984 – November 30, 1996	Santa Clara	
John Vasconcellos	Democratic	December 2, 1996 – November 30, 2004	Santa Clara	
Elaine Alquist	Democratic	December 6, 2004 – November 30, 2012	Santa Clara	
Jerry Hill	Democratic	December 3, 2012 – November 30, 2020	San Mateo, Santa Clara	
Josh Becker	Democratic	December 7, 2020 – present	San Mateo, Santa Clara	

== Election results (1990-present) ==
=== 2024 ===
2024 California State Senate 13th district election
Primary election
Party	Candidate	Votes	%
Democratic	Josh Becker (incumbent)	167,285	73.6
Republican	Alex Glew	42,841	18.8
Republican	Christina Laskowski	17,295	7.6
Total votes		227,421	100.0
General election
Democratic	Josh Becker (incumbent)	314,889	72.5
Republican	Alex Glew	119,674	27.5
Total votes		434,563	100.0
Democratic hold			

=== 2020 ===
2020 California State Senate 13th district election
Primary election
Party	Candidate	Votes	%
Democratic	Josh Becker	66,428	23.8
Republican	Alexander Glew	48,378	17.3
Democratic	Sally Lieber	47,773	17.1
Democratic	Shelly Masur	45,211	16.2
Democratic	Annie Oliva	33,311	11.9
Democratic	Mike Brownrigg	32,481	11.6
Libertarian	John H. Webster	5,910	2.1
Total votes		279,492	100.0
General election
Democratic	Josh Becker	348,005	75.4
Republican	Alexander Glew	113,315	24.6
Total votes		461,320	100.0
Democratic hold			

=== 2016 ===
2016 California State Senate 13th district election
Primary election
Party	Candidate	Votes	%
Democratic	Jerry Hill (incumbent)	171,411	75.6
Republican	Rick Ciardella	42,185	18.6
Libertarian	John H. Webster	13,018	5.7
Total votes		226,614	100.0
General election
Democratic	Jerry Hill (incumbent)	296,400	75.9
Republican	Rick Ciardella	94,269	24.1
Total votes		390,669	100.0
Democratic hold			

=== 2012 ===
2012 California State Senate 13th district election
Primary election
Party	Candidate	Votes	%
Democratic	Jerry Hill	76,033	51.1
Democratic	Sally J. Lieber	33,566	22.5
Libertarian	John H. Webster	23,003	15.4
Democratic	Christopher Kent Chiang	16,317	11.0
Total votes		148,919	100.0
General election
Democratic	Jerry Hill	218,775	66.1
Democratic	Sally J. Lieber	112,321	33.9
Total votes		331,096	100.0
Democratic hold			

=== 2008 ===
2008 California State Senate 13th district election
Party	Candidate	Votes	%
Democratic	Elaine Alquist (incumbent)	179,855	70.9
Republican	Shane Connolly	57,033	22.5
Libertarian	John Webster	16,659	6.6
Total votes		253,547	100.0
Democratic hold			

=== 2004 ===
2004 California State Senate 13th district election
Party	Candidate	Votes	%
Democratic	Elaine Alquist	156,321	68.5
Republican	Shane Patrick Connolly	62,157	27.3
Libertarian	Michael Laursen	9,585	4.2
No party	John H. Webster (write-in)	28	0.0
Total votes		228,091	100.0
Democratic hold			

=== 2000 ===
2000 California State Senate 13th district election
Party	Candidate	Votes	%
Democratic	John Vasconcellos (incumbent)	140,827	68.6
Republican	John Longwell	54,076	26.3
Libertarian	John Harvey Webster	10,507	5.1
Total votes		205,410	100.0
Democratic hold			

=== 1996 ===
1996 California State Senate 13th district election
Party	Candidate	Votes	%
Democratic	John Vasconcellos	117,640	58.6
Republican	Ray Morton	55,737	27.8
Reform	Dominic L. Cortese	17,715	6.8
Libertarian	John Harvey Webster	6,684	3.3
Natural Law	Rick J. Dunstan	3,021	1.6
Total votes		200,797	100.0
Democratic hold			

=== 1992 ===
1992 California State Senate 13th district election
Party	Candidate	Votes	%
Democratic	Al Alquist (incumbent)	140,081	60.4
Republican	Michael Iddings	72,340	31.2
Libertarian	John Harvey Webster	19,258	8.3
Total votes		231,679	100.0
Democratic hold			

== See also ==
- California State Senate
- California State Senate districts
- Districts in California
