= 2020 United States presidential election in California =

- November 3, 2020
- Turnout: 80.67% (of registered voters) ▲5.40 pp 70.88% (of eligible voters) ▲12.14 pp

Nominee	Joe Biden	Donald Trump
Party	Democratic	Republican
Home state	Delaware	Florida
Running mate	Kamala Harris	Mike Pence
Electoral vote	55	0
Popular vote	11,110,250	6,006,429
Percentage	63.48%	34.32%

Biden
40–50%
50–60%
60–70%
70–80%
80–90%
Trump
50–60%
60–70%
70–80%
President before election
Donald Trump
Republican
Elected President
Joe Biden
Democratic

The 2020 United States presidential election in California was held on Tuesday, November 3, 2020, as part of the 2020 United States presidential election in which all 50 states plus the District of Columbia participated. California voters chose electors to represent them in the Electoral College via a popular vote, pitting the Republican Party's nominee, incumbent President Donald Trump, and running mate Vice President Mike Pence against Democratic Party nominee, former Vice President Joe Biden, and his running mate Kamala Harris, the junior senator from California. In the 2020 election, California had 55 electoral votes in the Electoral College, the most of any state. Biden won by a wide margin, as was expected; however, California was one of seven states and DC where Trump received a larger percentage of the two-party vote than he did in 2016. (Note: The other six states were Arkansas, Florida, Hawaii, Nevada, Utah, and Illinois.) This election also marked the first time since 2004 that the Republican candidate won more than one million votes in Los Angeles County due to increased turnout.

California is considered a safe blue state in presidential elections due to large concentrations of Democratic voters in urban regions such as the San Francisco Bay Area, Sacramento, Los Angeles, and San Diego. As predicted, Biden easily carried California on election day, earning 63.5% of the vote and a margin of 29.2% over Trump. Biden earned the highest percentage of the vote in the state for any candidate since Franklin D. Roosevelt in 1936, although Biden's margin of victory was slightly smaller than Hillary Clinton's 30.1% in 2016, making it one of six states in which Trump improved on his 2016 margin. In California with his record 11.1 million votes received, Biden became the first, and as of 2024 the only, candidate in any race in U.S. history to win more than 10 million votes in a single state, while Trump received the most votes a Republican had ever received in a state to that point, narrowly besting his vote total in Texas, a state that he won; four years later his Texas vote total would set a new Republican record. Biden's vote margin was the largest vote margin for a presidential candidate in a singular state. California was also one of five states in the nation in which Biden's victory margin was larger than 1 million raw votes, the others being New York, Maryland, Massachusetts, and Illinois.

Per exit polls by Edison Research, Biden dominated such key constituencies in the state as Latinos (75%), African Americans (82%), Asian Americans (76%), and union households (63%). Post-election analysis by Cook Political Report showed Trump made inroads with some Asian American constituencies, particularly Vietnamese American and Filipino American voters. Biden flipped Butte and Inyo Counties into the Democratic column; they had not voted Democratic since 2008 and 1964, respectively. Biden's victory in Orange County was only the second time a Democrat carried the county since 1936, as well as only the fourth time in the county's history. In contrast, while he improved his total vote share by nearly three percentage points, Trump did not flip any counties and his main regions of strength came from Republican strongholds in Gold Country, Shasta Cascade, and parts of the Central Valley. California Secretary of State Alex Padilla certified the results on December 4, and took Harris's seat in the Senate upon her resignation to become Vice President, having been appointed by Governor Gavin Newsom.

== Primary elections ==
In a departure from previous election cycles, California held its primaries on Super Tuesday, March 3, 2020. Early voting began several weeks earlier. Donald Trump secured the Republican nomination on March 17, 2020, defeating several longshot candidates, most notably former Massachusetts governor Bill Weld. Kamala Harris, the state's junior U.S. senator, was among the Democratic candidates declared until she dropped out on December 3, 2019. Representative Eric Swalwell from the 15th district was also a Democratic candidate but dropped out of the race on July 8, 2019. Other prominent state figures, including former Governor Jerry Brown, current Governor Gavin Newsom, and Los Angeles mayor Eric Garcetti declined to run.

=== Republican primary ===
The Republican Party's primary campaign was dominated by a lawsuit over the President's taxes. The suit alleges that the new requirement for several years of a candidate's taxes was unconstitutional and onerous. The law was blocked in September 2019 while State Supreme court heard testimony and made a ruling.

As a contingency, the Republican state committee changed its delegate selection process, turning the primary into a mere "beauty contest" and setting up an emergency state convention to Trump's delegate choices. If Trump were allowed on the ballot, the convention would be canceled and the so-called "winner-take-most" rules, which require a challenger to get 20% of the vote, would apply.

Incumbent Trump was allowed on the ballot, and the contingency convention was canceled.

2020 California Republican presidential primary
Candidate	Votes	%	Estimated delegates
Donald Trump	2,279,120	92.2%	172
Bill Weld	66,904	2.7%	0
Joe Walsh (withdrawn)	64,749	2.6%	0
Rocky De La Fuente	24,351	1.0%	0
Matthew John Matern	15,469	0.6%	0
Robert Ardini	12,857	0.5%	0
Zoltan Istvan	8,141	0.3%	0
Total	2,471,591	100%	

=== Democratic primary ===
Candidates began filing their paperwork on November 4, 2019, and the final list was announced on December 9.

Leading California Democrats complained that Joe Biden and Senator Elizabeth Warren were snubbing the state by refusing to attend a forum at the State's "endorsement convention". Early voting began on February 11 and ended the day before primary day.

2020 California Democratic presidential primary
Candidate	Votes	%	Delegates
Bernie Sanders	2,080,846	35.97	225
Joe Biden	1,613,854	27.90	172
Elizabeth Warren	762,555	13.18	11
Michael Bloomberg	701,803	12.13	7
Pete Buttigieg (withdrawn) (Note: Candidate withdrew shortly before the primary, when all-mail voting had already begun.)	249,256	4.31	
Amy Klobuchar (withdrawn)	126,961	2.19	
Tom Steyer (withdrawn)	113,092	1.96	
Andrew Yang (withdrawn) (Note: Candidate withdrew following the New Hampshire primary, when all-mail voting had already begun.)	43,571	0.75	
Tulsi Gabbard	33,769	0.58	
Julian Castro (withdrawn)	13,892	0.24	
Michael Bennet (withdrawn)	7,377	0.13	
Marianne Williamson (withdrawn)	7,052	0.12	
Cory Booker (withdrawn)	6,000	0.10	
John Delaney (withdrawn)	4,606	0.08	
Joe Sestak (withdrawn)	3,270	0.06	
Deval Patrick (withdrawn)	2,022	0.03	
Other candidates / Write-in	(Note: Including 34 write-in votes)14,438	0.25	
Total	5,784,364	100%	415

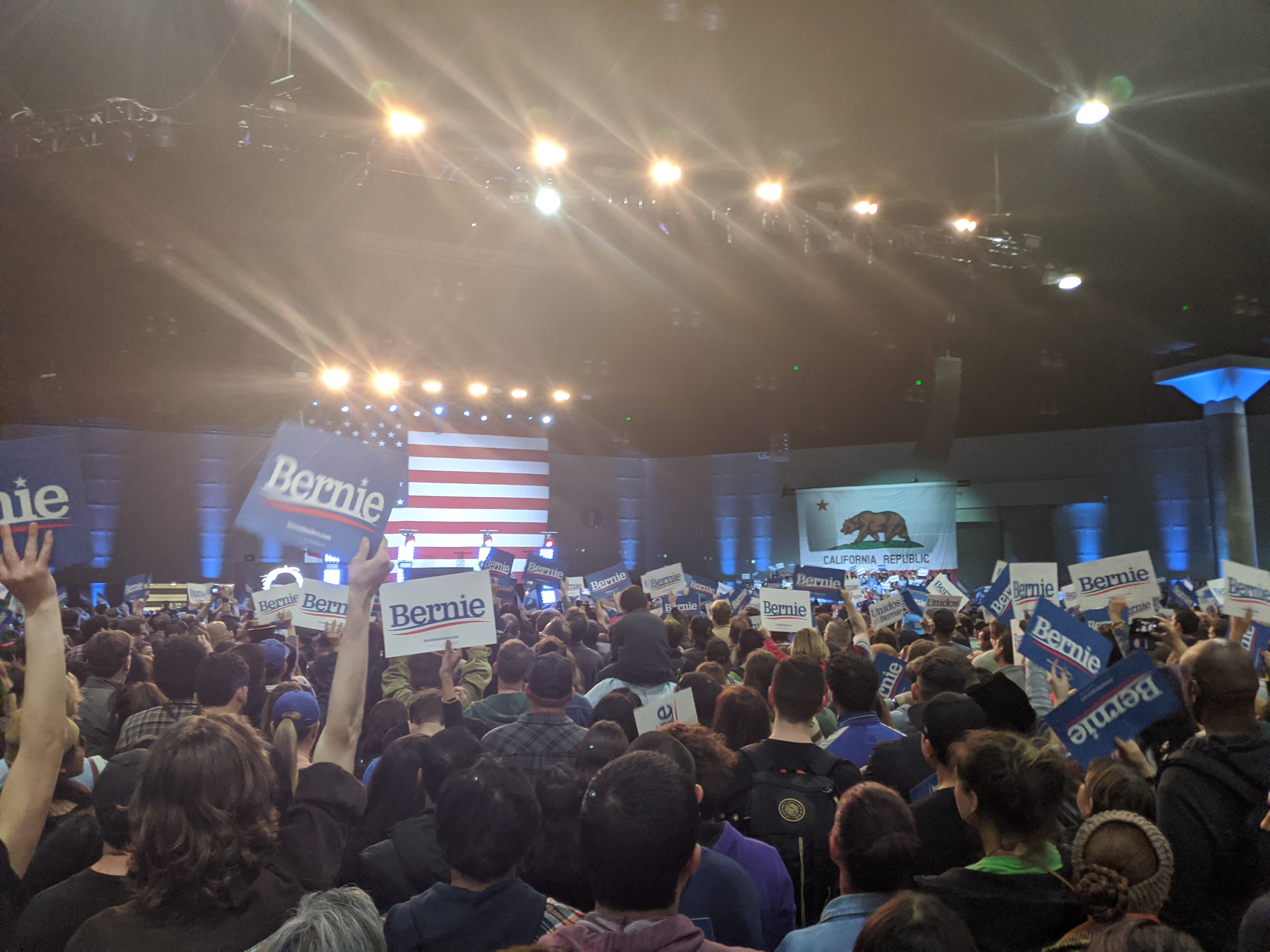
Bernie Sanders rally at the Los Angeles Convention Center

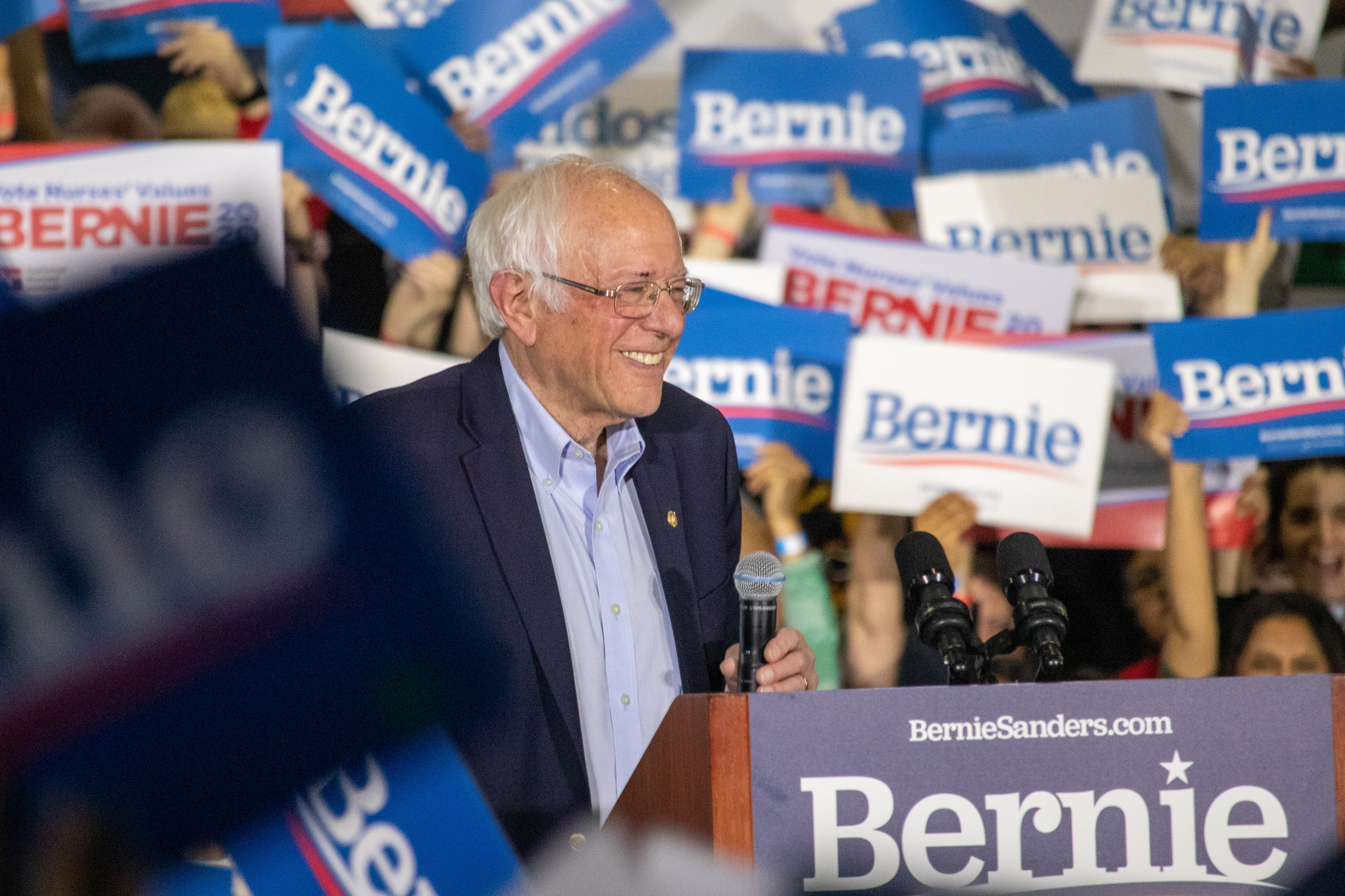
Senator Bernie Sanders at a campaign rally in San Jose on March 1, 2020

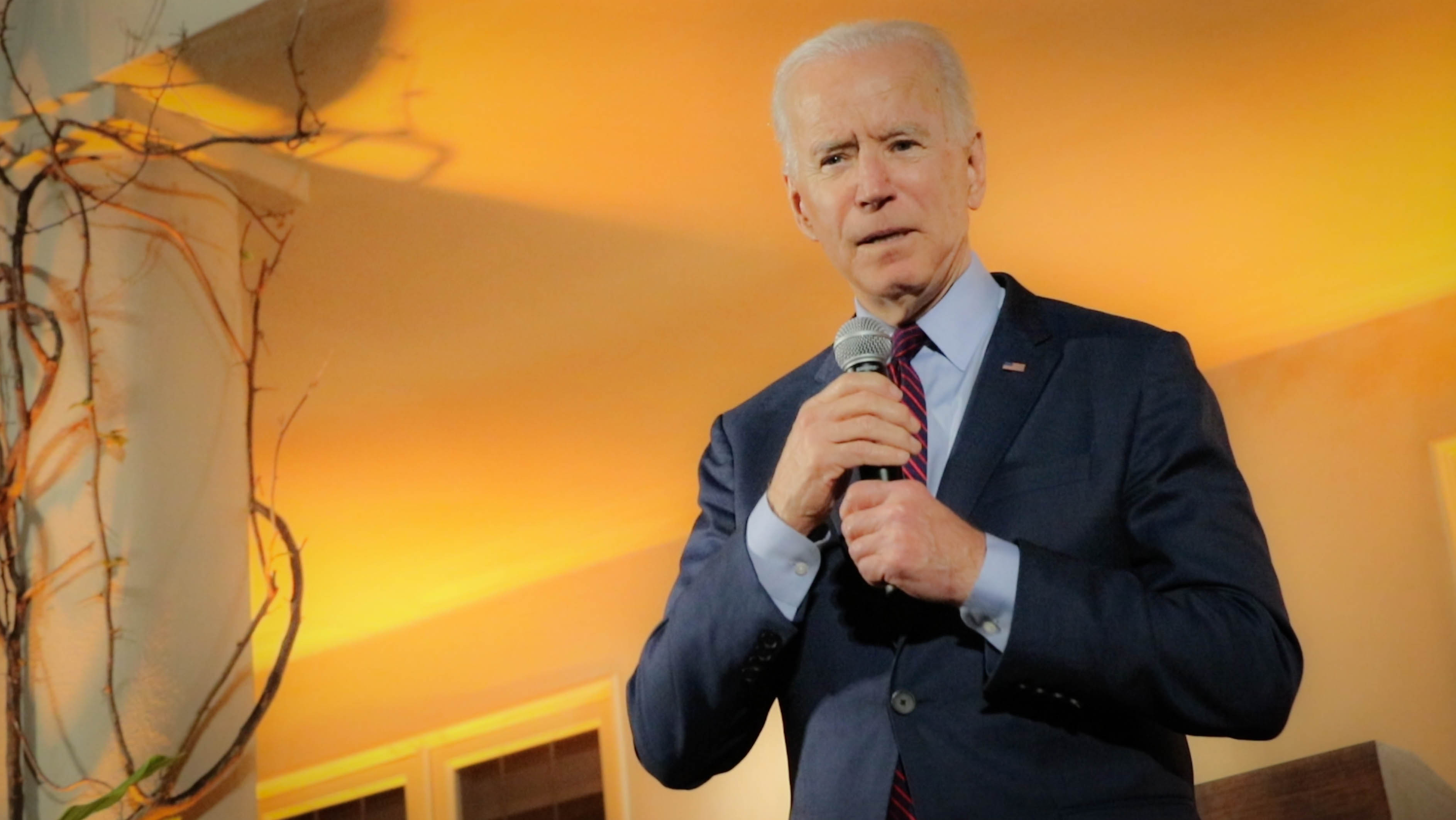
Joe Biden's presidential campaign in Bel Air, Los Angeles, on March 5, 2020

Votes (percentage) and delegates by district
District	Bernie Sanders		Joe Biden		Michael Bloomberg		Elizabeth Warren		Total delegates	District region	Largest city
1st	34%	2	23.7%	2	10.3%	0	12.9%	0	4	Shasta Cascade	Chico, Redding
2nd	33.3%	3	25.3%	2	13.5%	0	15.9%	1	6	North Coast	Eureka
3rd	34.3%	3	29.3%	2	12%	0	12%	0	5	Sacramento Valley	Fairfield
4th	26.1%	2	29.6%	3	14.7%	0	11.4%	0	5	Sierras	Roseville
5th	32.7%	3	27.2%	3	14.9%	0	12.6%	0	6	Wine Country	Santa Rosa
6th	35.8%	3	28.1%	2	10.7%	0	14.3%	0	5	Sacramento Valley	Sacramento
7th	30.9%	2	31.4%	3	13%	0	11.2%	0	5	Sacramento Valley	Elk Grove
8th	35.7%	2	31.2%	2	11.8%	0	8.8%	0	4	Eastern Desert	Victorville
9th	32.9%	2	32.5%	2	15.9%	1	7%	0	5	San Joaquin Valley	Stockton
10th	35.5%	2	29.1%	1	15.3%	1	7.2%	0	4	San Joaquin Valley	Modesto
11th	29%	2	30.7%	3	15.3%	1	14.7%	0	6	Bay Area	Concord
12th	33.8%	3	23.9%	2	11%	0	23.4%	2	7	San Francisco Bay Area	San Francisco
13th	38.7%	3	22.4%	2	8.1%	0	24.7%	2	7	Bay Area	Oakland
14th	31.9%	3	26.4%	2	15.6%	1	14.8%	0	6	Bay Area	Daly City
15th	34.1%	3	29.5%	3	14.4%	0	11.5%	0	6	Bay Area	Hayward
16th	40.9%	3	26.2%	1	12.6%	0	7.2%	0	4	San Joaquin Valley	Fresno, Merced
17th	36.1%	3	25.9%	2	14.3%	0	12.5%	0	5	Bay Area	Fremont, Santa Clara
18th	26.6%	2	29%	2	15.4%	1	17.1%	1	6	Bay Area	Sunnyvale
19th	38.9%	4	25.9%	2	13.6%	0	10.7%	0	6	Bay Area	San Jose
20th	39.8%	3	25.5%	2	10.9%	0	13%	0	5	Central Coast	Salinas
21st	43.2%	3	25.3%	1	13.7%	0	5.1%	0	4	San Joaquin Valley	Kings, Kern, SW Fresno
22nd	34.4%	2	29.1%	2	13%	0	8.8%	0	4	San Joaquin Valley	Visalia
23rd	34.9%	2	30.2%	2	12.2%	0	9%	0	4	South Central California	Bakersfield
24th	35.3%	3	26.8%	2	10.5%	0	14.7%	0	5	Central Coast	Santa Maria
25th	35.6%	3	33.6%	2	10%	0	10%	0	5	LA County	Santa Clarita
26th	34.4%	3	31.1%	2	12.1%	0	11.5%	0	5	Central Coast	Oxnard
27th	35.9%	2	29.2%	2	10.2%	0	15.7%	1	5	LA County	San Gabriel Valley
28th	40%	3	22.7%	2	7.5%	0	21.7%	1	6	LA County	Glendale
29th	49.8%	3	21.5%	2	7.7%	0	11.2%	0	5	LA County	San Fernando Valley
30th	32.6%	3	31.2%	2	11.2%	0	15.4%	1	6	LA County	San Fernando Valley
31st	39.1%	3	32.3%	2	11%	0	8.3%	0	5	Southern California	San Bernardino
32nd	44.7%	3	28.2%	2	10.5%	0	7.5%	0	5	LA County	El Monte
33rd	26.2%	2	34.2%	3	14.3%	0	16.1%	1	6	LA County	Santa Monica, Coastal LA
34th	53.7%	4	16.8%	1	8.1%	0	14.7%	0	5	LA County	Downtown Los Angeles
35th	46.6%	2	28.2%	2	10.9%	0	6.2%	0	4	Southern California	Fontana
36th	27.5%	1	29.8%	2	15.4%	1	8.1%	0	4	Eastern Desert	Indio
37th	35.6%	3	31.3%	2	10.1%	0	16.2%	1	6	LA County	West LA
38th	41.7%	3	30.8%	2	10.5%	0	7.6%	0	5	LA County	Norwalk
39th	36.7%	3	30.5%	2	12.6%	0	9.6%	0	5	Southern California	Fullerton
40th	56.4%	4	20.9%	1	8.9%	0	5.4%	0	5	LA County	East Los Angeles
41st	45%	3	27.9%	2	10.7%	0	7.5%	0	5	Southern California	Riverside
42nd	37%	3	31.6%	2	12.4%	0	7.9%	0	5	Southern California	Corona
43rd	36.5%	3	34.3%	2	10%	0	10.3%	0	5	LA County	Inglewood
44th	44%	3	29.6%	2	6.2%	0	9.6%	0	5	Los Angeles County	Compton
45th	34%	3	29.1%	2	13.5%	0	12%	0	5	Southern California	Irvine
46th	53.7%	2	20%	2	10.5%	0	7.7%	0	4	Southern California	Anaheim
47th	38.5%	3	27.3%	2	10.6%	0	12.2%	0	5	Southern California	Long Beach
48th	30.4%	2	30.3%	2	16.3%	1	11%	0	5	Southern California	Huntington Beach
49th	30.6%	3	30.5%	2	14.6%	0	12.2%	0	5	Southern California	Oceanside
50th	34.9%	2	27.6%	2	13%	0	11.3%	0	4	Southern California	Escondido
51st	49.2%	3	23.7%	2	11.3%	0	6.8%	0	5	Southern California	Downtown San Diego and Border Communities
52nd	30.6%	3	30%	3	13.4%	0	14.6%	0	6	Southern California	North San Diego
53rd	37.8%	3	27.3%	3	10.1%	0	14.5%	0	6	Southern California	Eastern San Diego and suburbs
Total	36.0%	144	27.9%	109	12.1%	7	13.2%	11	271		

Pledged delegates
Delegate type	Bernie Sanders	Joe Biden	Michael Bloomberg	Elizabeth Warren
At-large	51	39	0	0
PLEO	30	24	0	0
District-level	144	109	7	11
Total	225	172	7	11

=== Libertarian primary ===
2020 California Libertarian presidential primary
- March 3, 2020
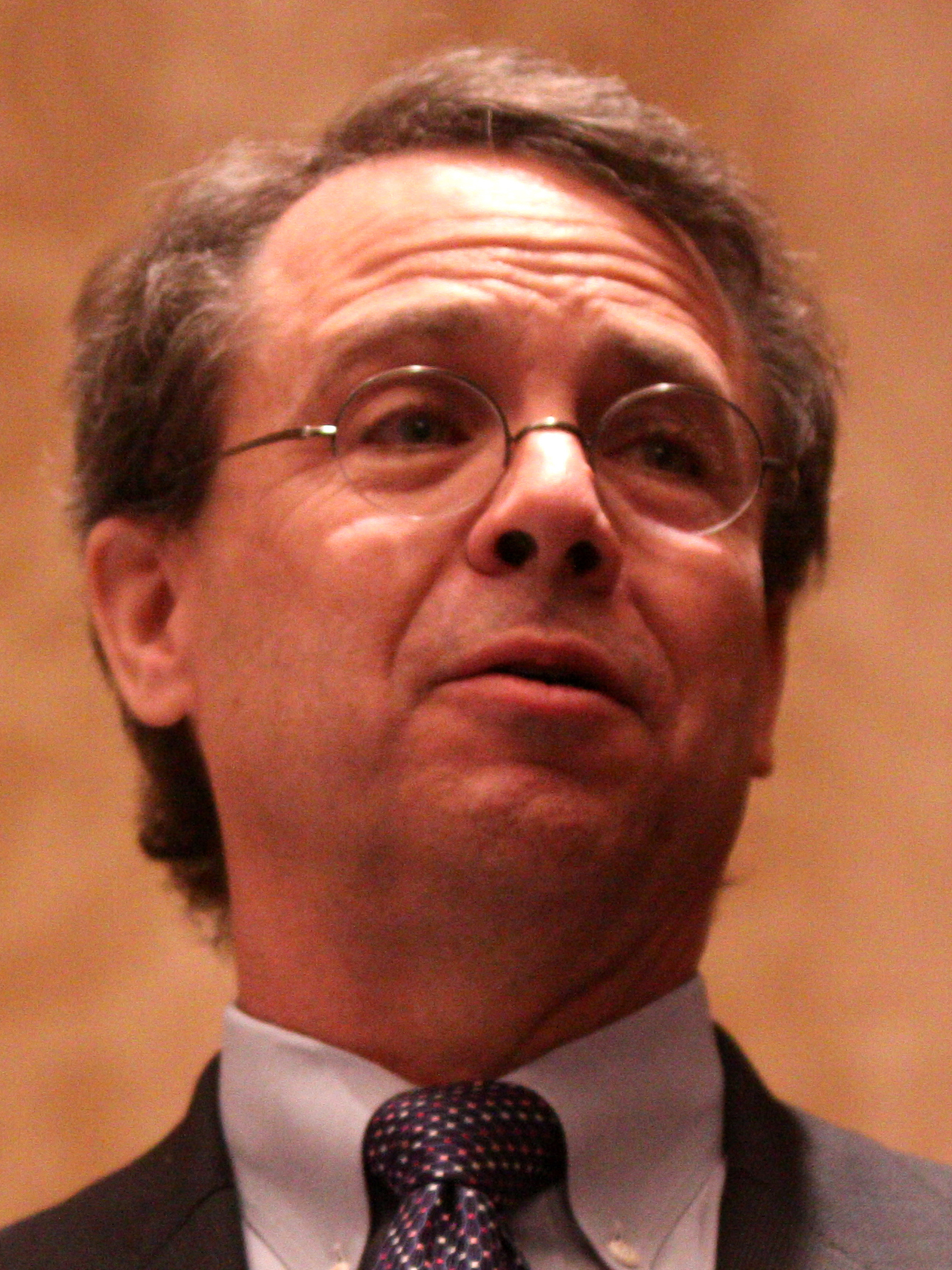

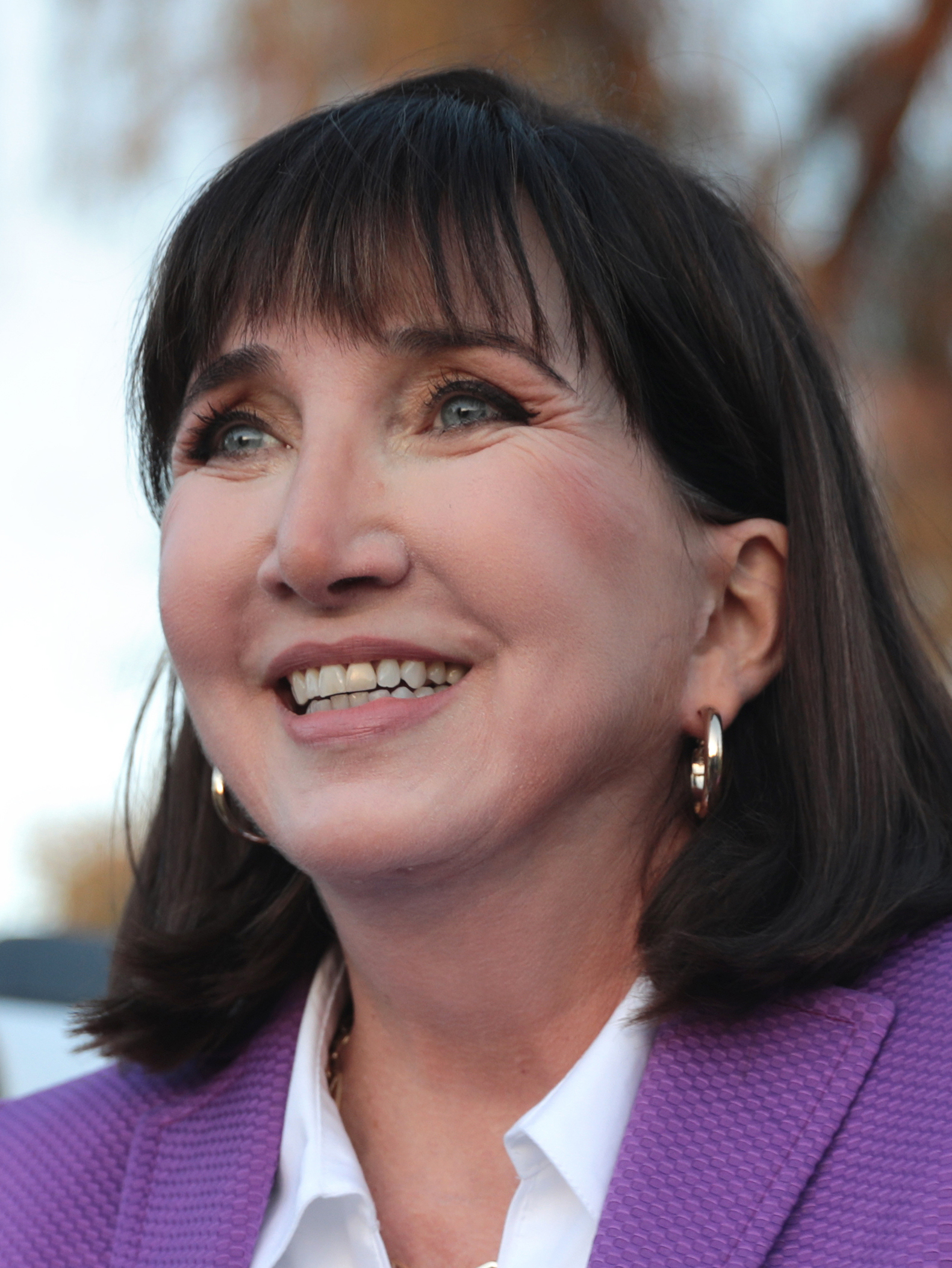

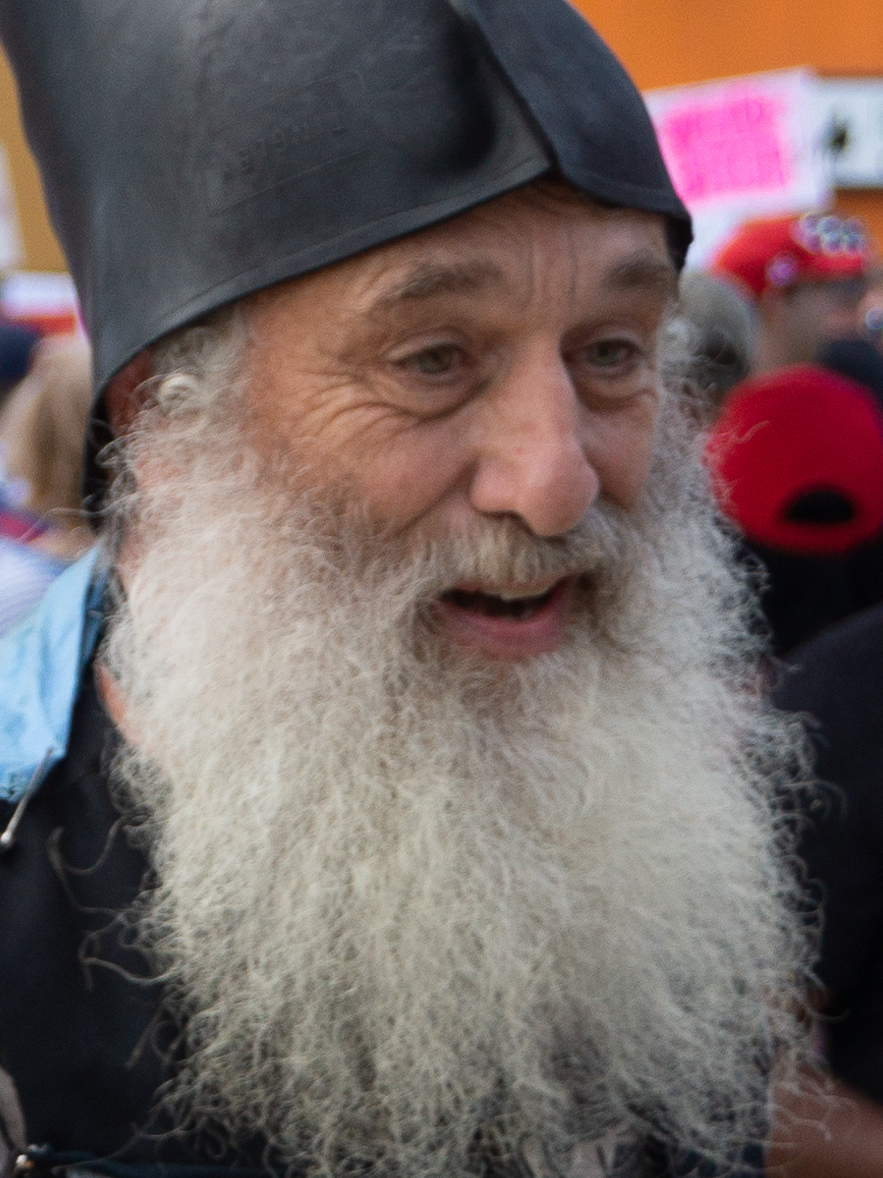

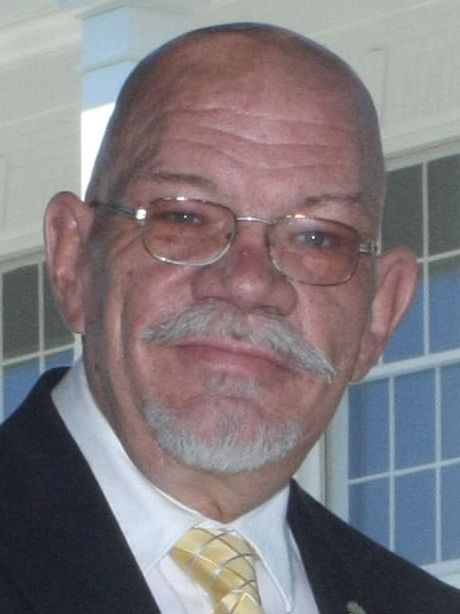

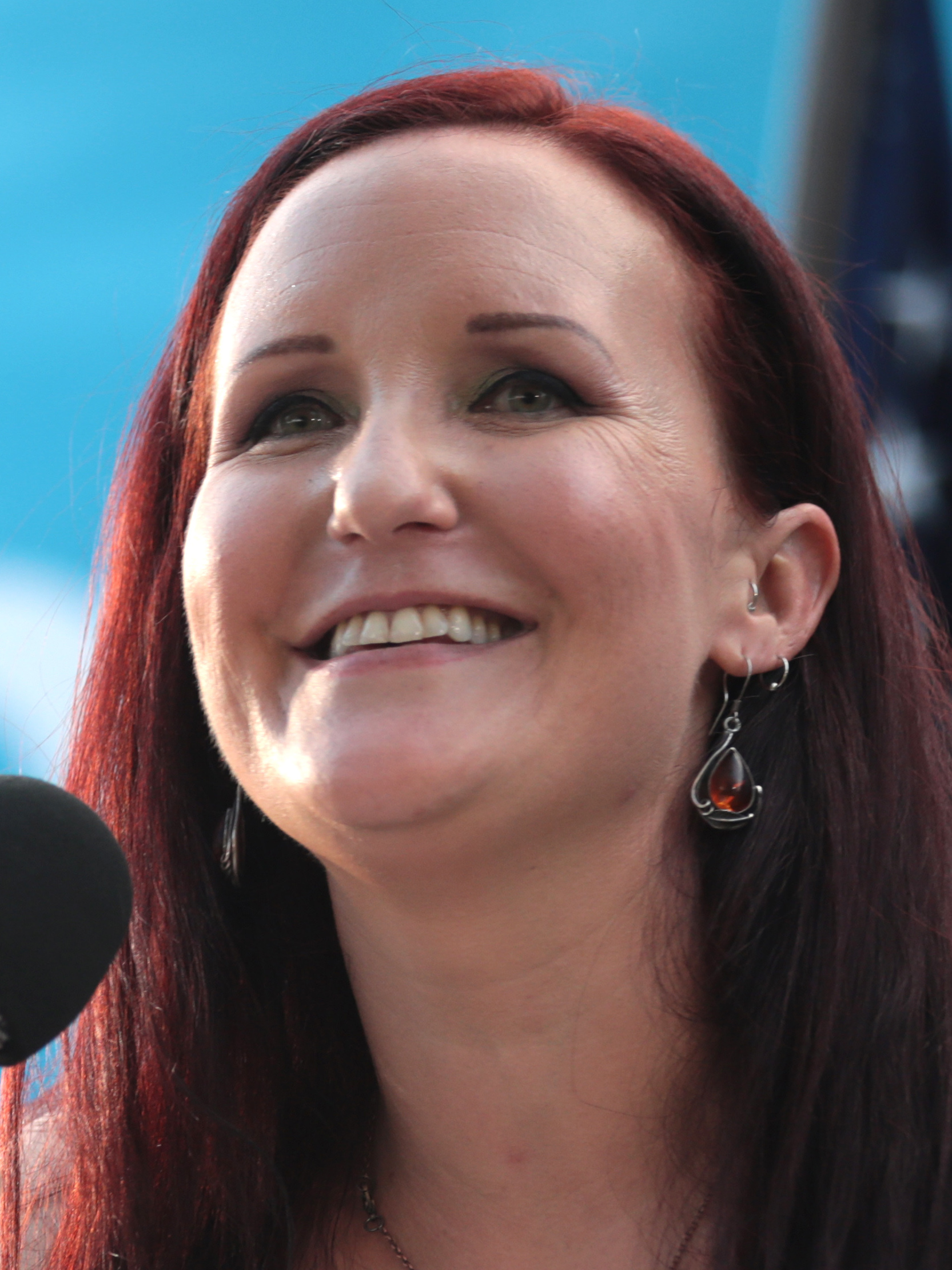

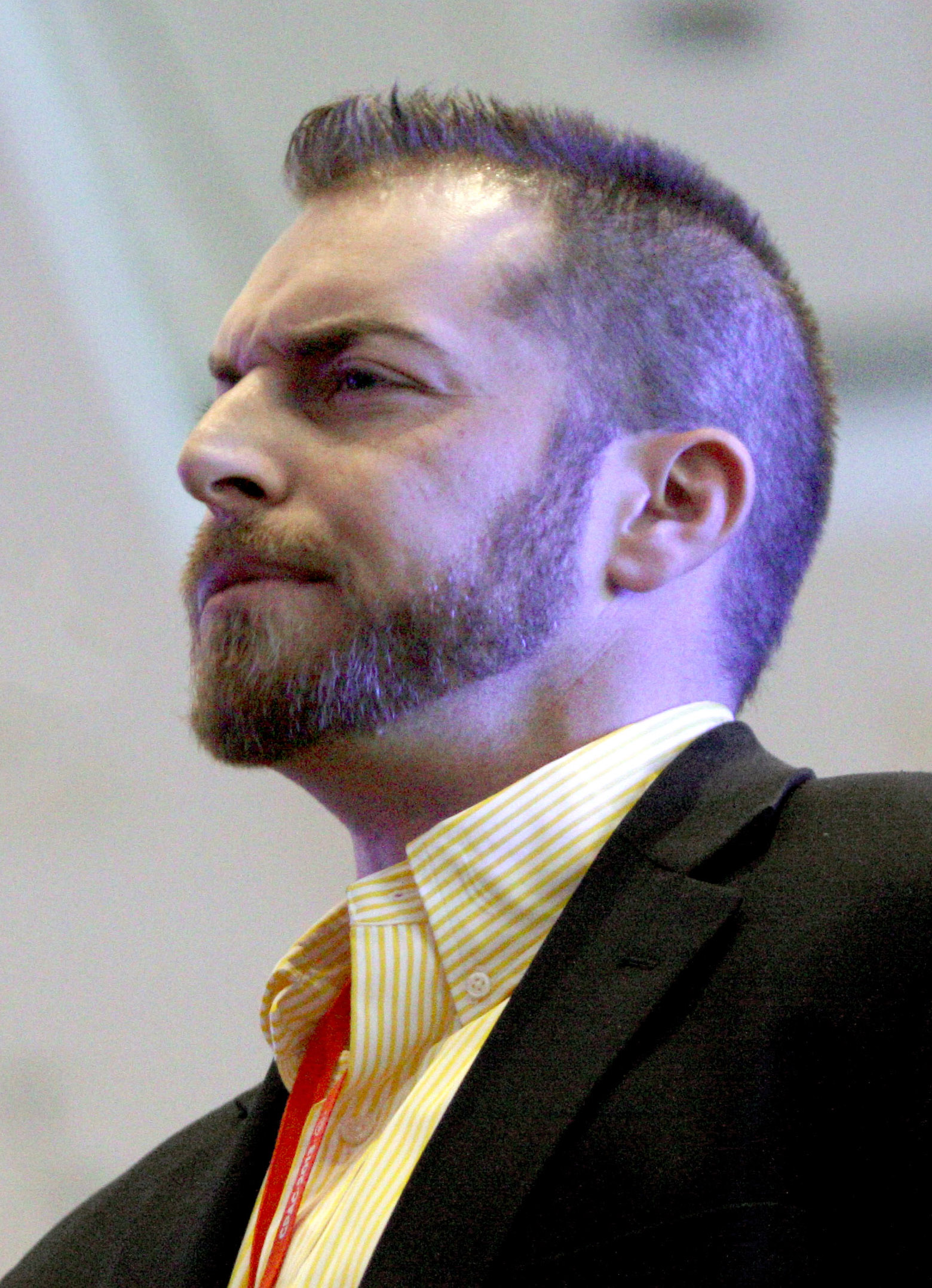

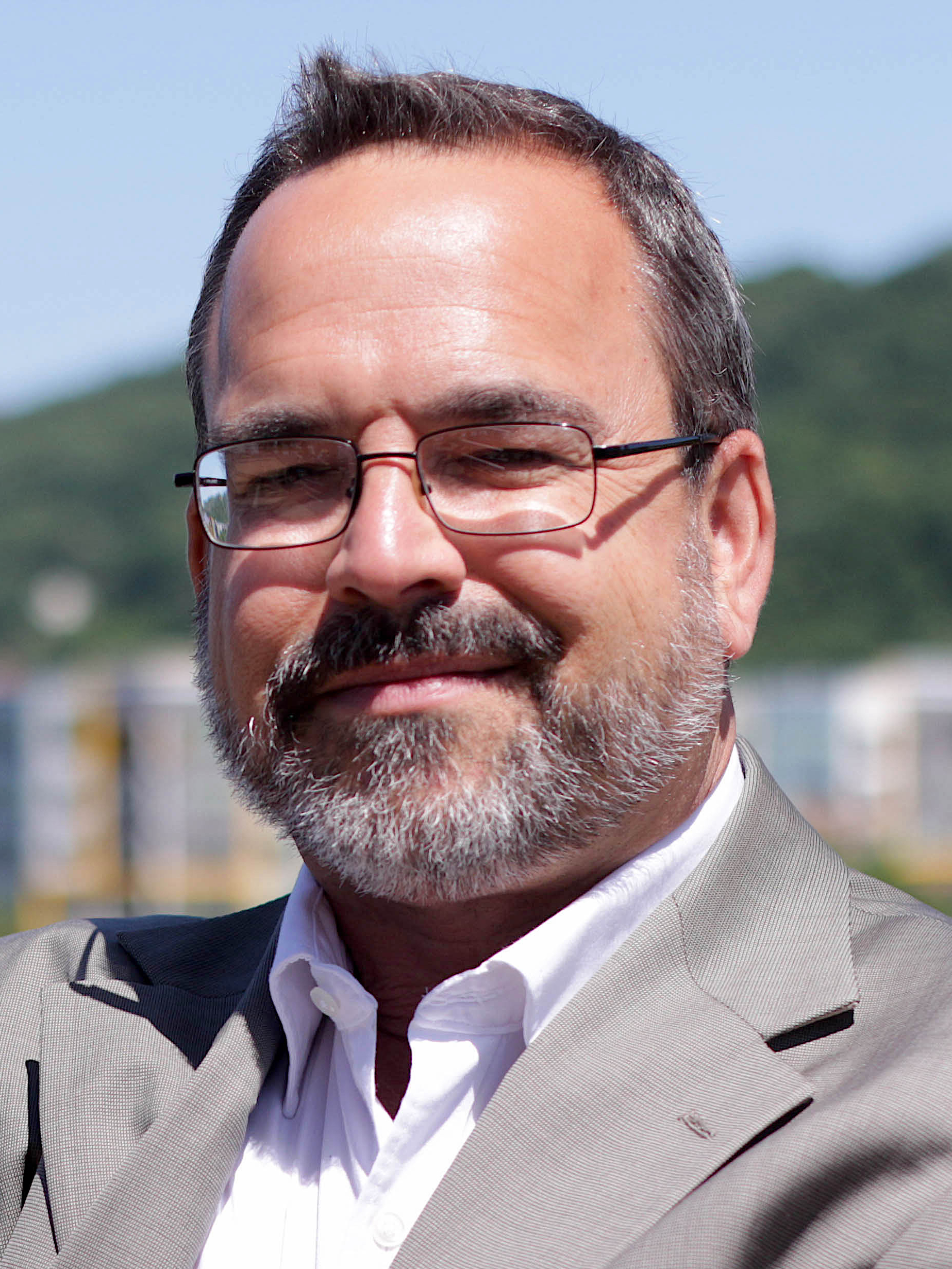

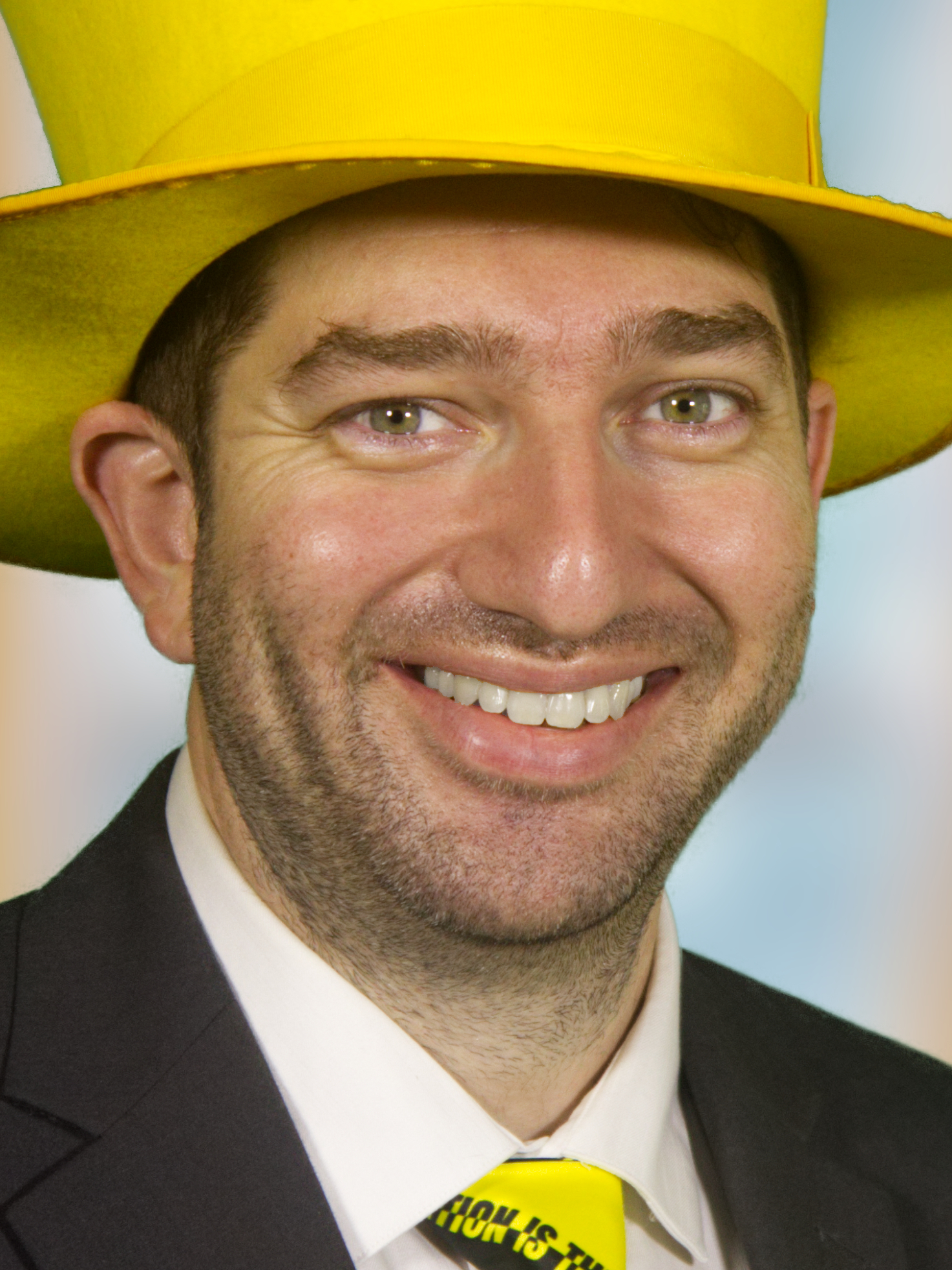

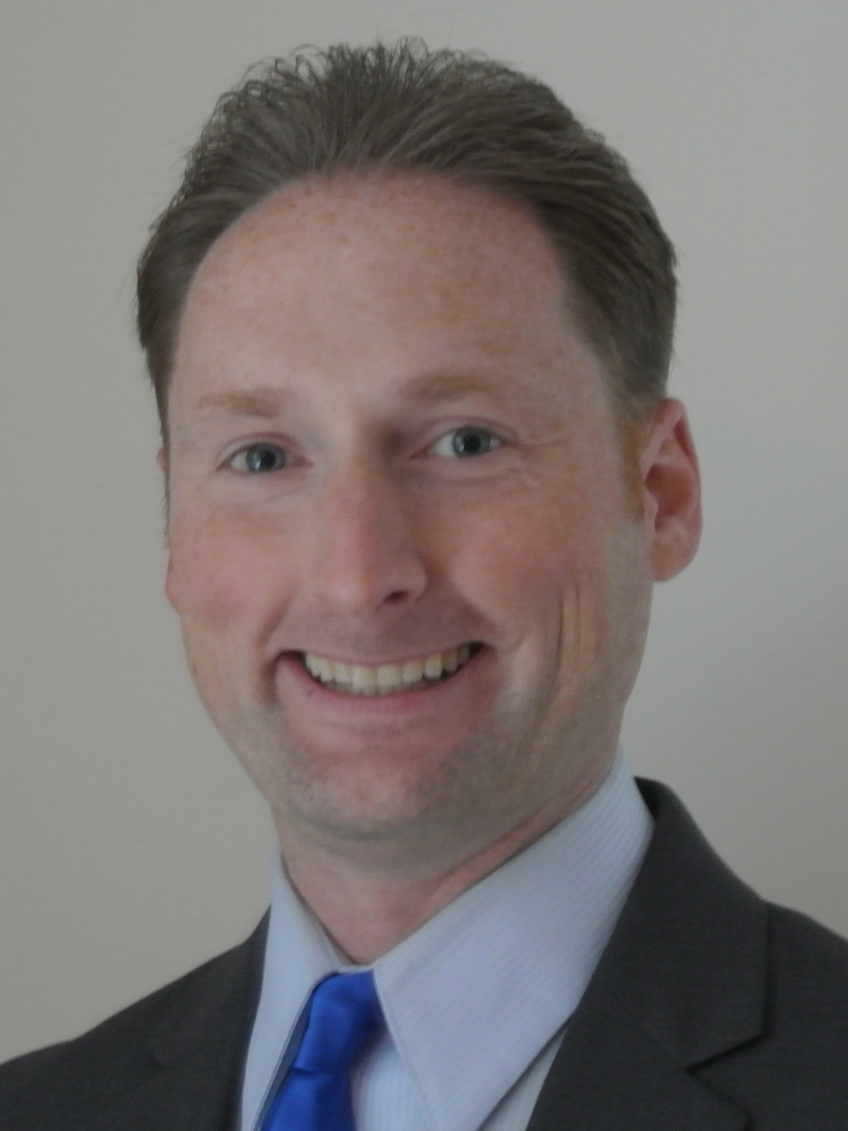
Candidate	Jacob Hornberger	Jo Jorgensen	Vermin Supreme
Home state	Virginia	South Carolina	Massachusetts
Popular vote	5,530	3,534	3,469
Percentage	19.4%	12.4%	12.2%
Candidate	Ken Armstrong	Kim Ruff (withdrawn)	Adam Kokesh
Home state	Oregon	Arizona	Indiana
Popular vote	3,011	2,330	2,161
Percentage	10.6%	8.2%	7.6%
Candidate	Sam Robb	Dan Behrman	Max Abramson
Home state	Pennsylvania	Nevada	New Hampshire
Popular vote	1,722	1,695	1,605
Percentage	6.0%	5.9%	5.6%
Election results by county
Jacob Hornberger Vermin Supreme Ken Armstrong	Kim Ruff Sam Robb Tie

The Libertarian Party of California permitted non-affiliated voters to vote in their presidential primary.

2020 California Libertarian presidential primary
Candidate	Votes	%
Jacob Hornberger	5,530	19.4
Jo Jorgensen	3,534	12.4
Vermin Supreme	3,469	12.2
Ken Armstrong	3,011	10.6
Kim Ruff (withdrawn)	2,330	8.2
Adam Kokesh	2,161	7.6
Sam Robb	1,722	6.0
Dan Behrman	1,695	5.9
Max Abramson	1,605	5.6
Souraya Faas	999	3.5
Steven A. Richey	982	3.4
Erik Gerhardt	748	2.6
Keenan Dunham	720	2.5
Sorinne Ardeleanu (write-in)	27	0.1
Geby Eva Espinosa (write-in)	2	0.0
Total	28,535	100.0

=== Green primary ===
2020 California Green primary
Candidate	Votes	Percentage	National delegates
Howie Hawkins	4,202	36.2%	16 estimated
Dario Hunter	2,558	22.0%	9 estimated
Sedinam Moyowasifza-Curry	2,071	17.8%	8 estimated
Dennis Lambert	1,999	17.2%	7 estimated
David Rolde	774	6.7%	3 estimated
Total	9,656	100.00%	43

=== American Independent primary ===
The American Independent Party permitted non-affiliated voters to vote in their presidential primary.

2020 California American Independent primary
Party	Candidate	Votes	%
American Independent	Phil Collins	11,532	32.8
American Independent	Roque "Rocky" De La Fuente	7,263	21.0
American Independent	Don Blankenship	6,913	19.7
American Independent	J. R. Myers	5,099	14.5
American Independent	Charles Kraut	4,216	12.0
Total votes		35,723	100%

=== Peace and Freedom primary ===
2020 California Peace and Freedom primary
Party	Candidate	Votes	%
Peace and Freedom	Gloria La Riva	2,570	66.0
Peace and Freedom	Howie Hawkins	1,325	34.0
Total votes		3,895	100%

== General election ==
=== Final predictions ===
Source	Ranking
The Cook Political Report	Solid D
Inside Elections	Solid D
Sabato's Crystal Ball	Safe D
Politico	Solid D
RCP	Solid D
Niskanen	Safe D
CNN	Solid D
The Economist	Safe D
CBS News	Likely D
270towin	Safe D
ABC News	Solid D
NPR	Likely D
NBC News	Solid D
538	Solid D

=== Polling ===
View source data.

==== Aggregate polls ====
Source of poll aggregation	Dates administered	Dates updated	Joe Biden Democratic	Donald Trump Republican	Other/ Undecided (Note: Calculated by taking the difference of 100% and all other candidates combined.)	Margin
270 to Win	October 17–27, 2020	November 3, 2020	61.7%	32.3%	6.0%	Biden +29.4
Real Clear Politics	September 26 – October 21, 2020	October 27, 2020	60.7%	31.0%	8.3%	Biden +29.7
FiveThirtyEight	until November 2, 2020	November 3, 2020	61.6%	32.4%	6.0%	Biden +29.2
Average			61.3%	31.9%	6.8%	Biden +29.4

==== Polls ====
Poll source	Date(s) administered	Sample size (Note: Key: A – all adults RV – registered voters LV – likely voters V – unclear)	Margin of error	Donald Trump Republican	Joe Biden Democratic	Jo Jorgensen Libertarian	Howie Hawkins Green	Other	Undecided
SurveyMonkey/Axios	Oct 20 – Nov 2, 2020	12,370 (LV)	± 1.5%	36% (Note: Overlapping sample with the previous SurveyMonkey/Axios poll, but more information available regarding sample size)	62%	–	–	–	–
David Binder Research	Oct 28 – Nov 1, 2020	800 (LV)	–	31%	62%	–	–	3%	4%
USC Schwarzenegger Institute	Oct 27–31, 2020	1,155 (RV)	± 3%	28%	65%	–	–	4% (Note: "Someone else" with 4%)	2%
SurveyMonkey/Tableau	Sep 30 – Oct 28, 2020	22,450 (LV)	–	37%	61%	–	–	–	–
Swayable	Oct 23–26, 2020	635 (LV)	± 5.2%	35%	62%	2%	1%	–	–
UC Berkeley/LA Times	Oct 16–21, 2020	5,352 (LV)	± 2%	29%	65%	1%	0%	0% (Note: De La Fuente (A) and De La Riva (PSOL) with 0%) (Note: De La Fuente listed as Guerra)	3%
Public Policy Institute of California	Oct 9–18, 2020	1,185 (LV)	± 4.3%	32%	58%	3%	2%	1% (Note: Would not vote with 1%; "Someone else" with no voters)	4%
SurveyMonkey/Tableau	Sep 1–30, 2020	20,346 (LV)	–	35%	63%	–	–	–	2%
SurveyUSA	Sep 26–28, 2020	588 (LV)	± 5.4%	34%	59%	–	–	3% (Note: "Another candidate" with 3%)	6%
Redfield & Wilton Strategies	Sep 19–21, 2020	1,775 (LV)	–	28%	62%	1%	1%	1% (Note: "Another Third Party/Write-in" with 1%)	8%
UC Berkeley/LA Times	Sep 9–15, 2020	5,942 (LV)	± 2%	28%	67%	1%	0%	0%	3%
Public Policy Institute of California	Sep 4–13, 2020	1,168 (LV)	± 4.3%	31%	60%	3%	2%	1%	2%
Spry Strategies/Women's Liberation Front (Note: Archived September 27, 2020, at the Wayback Machine)	Aug 29 – Sep 1, 2020	600 (LV)	± 4%	39%	56%	–	–	–	5%
SurveyMonkey/Tableau	Aug 1–31, 2020	17,537 (LV)	–	35%	63%	–	–	–	2%
David Binder Research	Aug 22–24, 2020	800 (LV)	–	31%	61%	–	–	3% (Note: "Someone else" with 3%)	5%
Redfield and Wilton Strategies	Aug 9, 2020	1,904 (LV)	± 2.3%	25%	61%	1%	1%	2% (Note: "Another Third Party/Write-in" with 2%)	9%
SurveyMonkey/Tableau	Jul 1–31, 2020	19,027 (LV)	–	35%	63%	–	–	–	2%
University of California Berkeley	Jul 21–27, 2020	6,756 (LV)	± 2.0%	28%	67%	–	–	–	5%
SurveyMonkey/Tableau	Jun 8–30, 2020	8,412 (LV)	–	36%	62%	–	–	–	2%
Public Policy Institute of California	May 19–26, 2020	1,048 (LV)	± 4.6%	33%	57%	–	–	6% (Note: "Someone else" with 4%; would not vote with 2%)	3%
SurveyUSA	May 18–19, 2020	537 (LV)	± 5.4%	30%	58%	–	–	5%	7%
Emerson College	May 8–10, 2020	800 (RV)	± 3.4%	35% (Note: Including voters who lean towards a given candidate)	65%	–	–	–	–
Public Policy Polling	Mar 28–29, 2020	962 (RV)	–	29%	67%	–	–	–	3%
AtlasIntel	Feb 24 – Mar 2, 2020	1,100 (RV)	± 3.0%	26%	62%	–	–	12%	–
YouGov	Feb 26–28, 2020	1,507 (RV)	–	31%	59%	–	–	4%	4%
CNN/SSRS	Feb 22–26, 2020	951 (RV)	± 3.3%	35%	60%	–	–	3% (Note: Other with 0%; neither with 3%)	3%
University of California Berkeley	Feb 20–25, 2020	5,526 (RV)	–	31%	58%	–	–	–	11%
SurveyUSA	Feb 13–16, 2020	1,196 (RV)	± 3.1%	37%	57%	–	–	–	6%
YouGov/USC Price-Schwarzenegger Institute	Feb 1–15, 2020	1,200 (RV)	± 3.1%	30%	60%	–	–	–	4%
SurveyUSA	Jan 14–16, 2020	1,967 (RV)	± 2.8%	35%	59%	–	–	–	6%
CNN/SSRS	Dec 4–8, 2019	1,011 (RV)	± 3.4%	36%	56%	–	–	3%	5%
SurveyUSA	Nov 20–22, 2019	2,039 (RV)	± 2.4%	32%	59%	–	–	–	9%
SurveyUSA	Oct 15–16, 2019	1,242 (RV)	± 3.8%	32%	59%	–	–	–	9%
Emerson College	Sep 13–16, 2019	830 (RV)	± 3.3%	36%	64%	–	–	–	–
SurveyUSA	Sep 13–15, 2019	1,785 (RV)	± 3.2%	31%	57%	–	–	–	11%
SurveyUSA	Aug 1–5, 2019	2,184 (RV)	± 2.7%	27%	61%	–	–	–	12%
SurveyUSA	Mar 22–25, 2018	882 (RV)	± 3.8%	33%	56%	–	–	–	11%

Hypothetical polling

with Donald Trump and Bernie Sanders

Poll source	Date(s) administered	Sample size	Margin of error	Donald Trump (R)	Bernie Sanders (D)	Other	Undecided
AtlasIntel	Feb 24 – Mar 2, 2020	1,100 (RV)	± 3.0%	28%	60%	12%	–
YouGov	Feb 26–28, 2020	1,507 (RV)	–	31%	59%	6% (Note: "Other" with 3%; would not vote with 3%)	4%
CNN/SSRS	Feb 22–26, 2020	951 (RV)	± 3.3%	36%	59%	3%	2%
University of California Berkeley	Feb 20–25, 2020	5,526 (RV)	–	31%	59%	–	10%
SurveyUSA	Feb 13–16, 2020	1,196 (RV)	± 3.1%	37%	58%	–	6%
YouGov/USC Price-Schwarzenegger Institute	Feb 1–15, 2020	1,200 (RV)	± 3.1%	31%	61%	–	4%
SurveyUSA	Jan 14–16, 2020	1,967 (RV)	± 2.7%	36%	59%	–	5%
CNN/SSRS	Dec 4–8, 2019	1,011 (RV)	± 3.4%	38%	54%	4% (Note: Other with 1%; neither with 3%)	4%
SurveyUSA	Nov 20–22, 2019	2,039 (RV)	± 2.4%	34%	60%	–	7%
SurveyUSA	Oct 15–16, 2019	1,242 (RV)	± 3.8%	33%	59%	–	8%
Emerson College	Sep 13–16, 2019	830 (RV)	± 3.3%	38%	63%	–	–
SurveyUSA	Sep 13–15, 2019	1,785 (RV)	± 3.2%	33%	57%	–	10%
SurveyUSA	Aug 1–5, 2019	2,184 (RV)	± 2.7%	29%	62%	–	9%

with Donald Trump and Tulsi Gabbard

Poll source	Date(s) administered	Sample size	Margin of error	Donald Trump (R)	Tulsi Gabbard (D)	Undecided
SurveyUSA	Jan 14–16, 2020	1,967 (RV)	± 2.8%	38%	43%	19%

with Donald Trump and Elizabeth Warren

Poll source	Date(s) administered	Sample size	Margin of error	Donald Trump (R)	Elizabeth Warren (D)	Other	Undecided
AtlasIntel	Feb 24 – Mar 2, 2020	1,100 (RV)	± 3.0%	28%	60%	12%	–
YouGov	Feb 26–28, 2020	1,507 (RV)	–	32%	57%	5% (Note: "Other" with 3%; would not vote with 2%)	6%
CNN/SSRS	Feb 22–26, 2020	951 (RV)	± 3.3%	37%	56%	3%	4%
University of California Berkeley	Feb 20–25, 2020	5,526 (RV)	–	33%	58%	–	10%
SurveyUSA	Feb 13–16, 2020	1,196 (RV)	± 3.1%	38%	54%	–	8%
YouGov/USC Price-Schwarzenegger Institute	Feb 1–15, 2020	1,200 (RV)	± 3.1%	32%	59%	–	4%
SurveyUSA	Jan 14–16, 2020	1,967 (RV)	± 2.8%	39%	55%	–	7%
CNN/SSRS	Dec 4–8, 2019	1,011 (RV)	± 3.4%	37%	53%	4%	6%
SurveyUSA	Nov 20–22, 2019	2,039 (RV)	± 2.4%	35%	56%	–	9%
SurveyUSA	Oct 15–16, 2019	1,242 (RV)	± 3.9%	33%	55%	–	12%
SurveyUSA	Oct 15–16, 2019	1,242 (RV)	± 3.8%	35%	56%	–	8%
Emerson College	Sep 13–16, 2019	830 (RV)	± 3.3%	39%	61%	–	–
SurveyUSA	Sep 13–15, 2019	1,785 (RV)	± 3.2%	35%	53%	–	12%
SurveyUSA	Aug 1–5, 2019	2,184 (RV)	± 2.7%	30%	58%	–	12%
SurveyUSA	Jan 7–9, 2018	909 (RV)	± 3.3%	32%	53%	–	14%

with Donald Trump and Michael Bloomberg

Poll source	Date(s) administered	Sample size	Margin of error	Donald Trump (R)	Michael Bloomberg (D)	Other	Undecided
AtlasIntel	Feb 24 – Mar 2, 2020	1,100 (RV)	± 3.0%	25%	51%	24%	–
YouGov	Feb 26–28, 2020	1,507 (RV)	–	32%	51%	10% (Note: "Other" with 6%; would not vote with 4%)	7%
CNN/SSRS	Feb 22–26, 2020	951 (RV)	± 3.3%	35%	55%	4% (Note: Other with 0%; neither with 4%)	5%
University of California Berkeley	Feb 20–25, 2020	5,526 (RV)	–	30%	54%	–	16%
SurveyUSA	Feb 13–16, 2020	1,196 (RV)	± 3.1%	34%	59%	–	7%
YouGov/USC Price-Schwarzenegger Institute	Feb 1–15, 2020	1,200 (RV)	± 3.1%	31%	57%	–	6%
SurveyUSA	Jan 14–16, 2020	1,967 (RV)	± 2.8%	36%	56%	–	8%
SurveyUSA	Nov 20–22, 2019	2,039 (RV)	± 2.4%	34%	50%	–	16%

with Donald Trump and Amy Klobuchar

Poll source	Date(s) administered	Sample size	Margin of error	Donald Trump (R)	Amy Klobuchar (D)	Other	Undecided
YouGov	Feb 26–28, 2020	1,507 (RV)	–	31%	59%	7% (Note: "Other" with 5%; would not vote with 2%)	7%
CNN/SSRS	Feb 22–26, 2020	951 (RV)	± 3.3%	35%	55%	4%	6%
University of California Berkeley	Feb 20–25, 2020	5,526 (RV)	–	30%	57%	–	13%
SurveyUSA	Feb 13–16, 2020	1,196 (RV)	± 3.1%	37%	52%	–	11%
SurveyUSA	Jan 14–16, 2020	1,967 (RV)	± 2.8%	38%	50%	–	11%

with Donald Trump and Pete Buttigieg

Poll source	Date(s) administered	Sample size	Margin of error	Donald Trump (R)	Pete Buttigieg (D)	Other	Undecided
YouGov	Feb 26–28, 2020	1,507 (RV)	–	33%	54%	8% (Note: "Other" with 5%; would not vote with 3%)	6%
CNN/SSRS	Feb 22–26, 2020	951 (RV)	± 3.3%	35%	56%	4%	4%
University of California Berkeley	Feb 20–25, 2020	5,526 (RV)	–	30%	58%	–	12%
SurveyUSA	Feb 13–16, 2020	1,196 (RV)	± 3.1%	36%	56%	–	8%
YouGov/USC Price-Schwarzenegger Institute	Feb 1–15, 2020	1,200 (RV)	± 3.1%	31%	57%	–	6%
SurveyUSA	Jan 14–16, 2020	1,967 (RV)	± 2.8%	37%	53%	–	10%
CNN/SSRS	Dec 4–8, 2019	1,011 (RV)	± 3.4%	36%	53%	4%	7%
SurveyUSA	Nov 20–22, 2019	2,039 (RV)	± 2.4%	34%	52%	–	14%
SurveyUSA	Oct 15–16, 2019	1,242 (RV)	± 3.9%	32%	54%	–	13%
SurveyUSA	Aug 1–5, 2019	2,184 (RV)	± 2.8%	30%	53%	–	17%

with Donald Trump and Tom Steyer

Poll source	Date(s) administered	Sample size	Margin of error	Donald Trump (R)	Tom Steyer (D)	Undecided
SurveyUSA	Feb 13–16, 2020	1,196 (RV)	± 3.1%	38%	54%	9%
SurveyUSA	Jan 14–16, 2020	1,967 (RV)	± 2.8%	37%	53%	10%

with Donald Trump and Deval Patrick

Poll source	Date(s) administered	Sample size	Margin of error	Donald Trump (R)	Deval Patrick (D)	Undecided
SurveyUSA	Mar 22–25, 2018	882 (RV)	± 3.8%	34%	34%	32%

with Donald Trump and Andrew Yang

Poll source	Date(s) administered	Sample size	Margin of error	Donald Trump (R)	Andrew Yang (D)	Undecided
SurveyUSA	Jan 14–16, 2020	1,967 (RV)	± 2.8%	37%	53%	10%

with Donald Trump and Cory Booker

Poll source	Date(s) administered	Sample size	Margin of error	Donald Trump (R)	Cory Booker (D)	Undecided
SurveyUSA	Mar 22–25, 2018	882 (RV)	± 3.8%	35%	39%	26%

with Donald Trump and Kamala Harris

Poll source	Date(s) administered	Sample size	Margin of error	Donald Trump (R)	Kamala Harris (D)	Undecided
SurveyUSA	Nov 20–22, 2019	2,039 (RV)	± 2.4%	35%	56%	8%
SurveyUSA	Oct 15–16, 2019	1,242 (RV)	± 3.8%	35%	57%	8%
Emerson College	Sep 13–16, 2019	830 (RV)	± 3.3%	39%	61%	–
SurveyUSA	Sep 13–15, 2019	1,785 (RV)	± 3.2%	35%	53%	12%
SurveyUSA	Aug 1–5, 2019	2,184 (RV)	± 2.7%	30%	59%	12%
SurveyUSA	Mar 22–25, 2018	882 (RV)	± 3.8%	35%	54%	12%
SurveyUSA	Jan 7–9, 2018	909 (RV)	± 3.3%	33%	53%	13%

with Donald Trump and Beto O'Rourke

Poll source	Date(s) administered	Sample size	Margin of error	Donald Trump (R)	Beto O'Rourke (D)	Undecided
SurveyUSA	Sep 13–15, 2019	1,785 (RV)	± 3.2%	34%	51%	15%

with Donald Trump and Kirsten Gillibrand

Poll source	Date(s) administered	Sample size	Margin of error	Donald Trump (R)	Kirsten Gillibrand (D)	Undecided
SurveyUSA	Mar 22–25, 2018	882 (RV)	± 3.8%	33%	47%	19%
SurveyUSA	Jan 7–9, 2018	909 (RV)	± 3.3%	32%	46%	22%

with Donald Trump and Jerry Brown

Poll source	Date(s) administered	Sample size	Margin of error	Donald Trump (R)	Jerry Brown (D)	Undecided
SurveyUSA	Mar 22–25, 2018	882 (RV)	± 3.8%	35%	54%	11%

with Donald Trump and Sherrod Brown

Poll source	Date(s) administered	Sample size	Margin of error	Donald Trump (R)	Sherrod Brown (D)	Undecided
SurveyUSA	Mar 22–25, 2018	882 (RV)	± 3.8%	35%	36%	29%

with Donald Trump and Eric Garcetti

Poll source	Date(s) administered	Sample size	Margin of error	Donald Trump (R)	Eric Garcetti (D)	Undecided
SurveyUSA	Mar 22–25, 2018	882 (RV)	± 3.8%	34%	49%	17%
SurveyUSA	Jan 7–9, 2018	909 (RV)	± 3.3%	32%	46%	21%

with Donald Trump and Tom Hanks

Poll source	Date(s) administered	Sample size	Margin of error	Donald Trump (R)	Tom Hanks (D)	Undecided
SurveyUSA	Mar 22–25, 2018	882 (RV)	± 3.8%	34%	51%	15%
SurveyUSA	Jan 7–9, 2018	909 (RV)	± 3.3%	31%	56%	14%

with Donald Trump and Eric Holder

Poll source	Date(s) administered	Sample size	Margin of error	Donald Trump (R)	Eric Holder (D)	Undecided
SurveyUSA	Mar 22–25, 2018	882 (RV)	± 3.8%	35%	38%	26%

with Donald Trump and Mitch Landrieu

Poll source	Date(s) administered	Sample size	Margin of error	Donald Trump (R)	Mitch Landrieu (D)	Undecided
SurveyUSA	Mar 22–25, 2018	882 (RV)	± 3.8%	35%	36%	29%

with Donald Trump and Michelle Obama

Poll source	Date(s) administered	Sample size	Margin of error	Donald Trump (R)	Michelle Obama (D)	Undecided
SurveyUSA	Aug 1–5, 2019	2,184 (RV)	± 2.7%	28%	64%	8%
SurveyUSA	Mar 22–25, 2018	882 (RV)	± 3.8%	36%	57%	8%

with Donald Trump and Oprah Winfrey

Poll source	Date(s) administered	Sample size	Margin of error	Donald Trump (R)	Oprah Winfrey (D)	Undecided
SurveyUSA	Aug 1–5, 2019	2,184 (RV)	± 2.7%	28%	57%	14%
SurveyUSA	Mar 22–25, 2018	882 (RV)	± 3.8%	35%	52%	13%
SurveyUSA	Jan 7–9, 2018	909 (RV)	± 3.3%	32%	56%	12%

with Donald Trump and Mark Zuckerberg

Poll source	Date(s) administered	Sample size	Margin of error	Donald Trump (R)	Mark Zuckerberg (D)	Undecided
SurveyUSA	Mar 22–25, 2018	882 (RV)	± 3.8%	36%	42%	22%
SurveyUSA	Jan 7–9, 2018	909 (RV)	± 3.3%	31%	50%	19%

with Mike Pence and Joe Biden

Poll source	Date(s) administered	Sample size	Margin of error	Mike Pence (R)	Joe Biden (D)	Undecided
SurveyUSA	Nov 20–22, 2019	2,039 (RV)	± 2.4%	29%	59%	12%
SurveyUSA	Oct 15–16, 2019	1,242 (RV)	± 3.8%	30%	58%	13%
SurveyUSA	Sep 13–15, 2019	1,785 (RV)	± 3.2%	27%	58%	15%

with Mike Pence and Michael Bloomberg

Poll source	Date(s) administered	Sample size	Margin of error	Mike Pence (R)	Michael Bloomberg (D)	Undecided
SurveyUSA	Nov 20–22, 2019	2,039 (RV)	± 2.4%	32%	48%	20%

with Mike Pence and Pete Buttigieg

Poll source	Date(s) administered	Sample size	Margin of error	Mike Pence (R)	Pete Buttigieg (D)	Undecided
SurveyUSA	Nov 20–22, 2019	2,039 (RV)	± 2.4%	34%	48%	17%
SurveyUSA	Oct 15–16, 2019	1,242 (RV)	± 3.9%	34%	45%	21%

with Mike Pence and Bernie Sanders

Poll source	Date(s) administered	Sample size	Margin of error	Mike Pence (R)	Bernie Sanders (D)	Undecided
SurveyUSA	Nov 20–22, 2019	2,039 (RV)	± 2.4%	31%	59%	9%
SurveyUSA	Oct 15–16, 2019	1,242 (RV)	± 3.8%	31%	58%	10%
SurveyUSA	Sep 13–15, 2019	1,785 (RV)	± 3.2%	31%	57%	13%

with Mike Pence and Elizabeth Warren

Poll source	Date(s) administered	Sample size	Margin of error	Mike Pence (R)	Elizabeth Warren (D)	Undecided
SurveyUSA	Nov 20–22, 2019	2,039 (RV)	± 2.4%	34%	53%	13%
SurveyUSA	Oct 15–16, 2019	1,242 (RV)	± 3.9%	33%	55%	12%
SurveyUSA	Sep 13–15, 2019	1,785	± 3.2%	33%	50%	16%

with Nikki Haley and Joe Biden

Poll source	Date(s) administered	Sample size	Margin of error	Nikki Haley (R)	Joe Biden (D)	Undecided
SurveyUSA	Oct 15–16, 2019	1,242 (RV)	± 3.9%	21%	56%	23%
SurveyUSA	Sep 13–15, 2019	1,785 (RV)	± 3.2%	21%	56%	24%

with Nikki Haley and Pete Buttigieg

Poll source	Date(s) administered	Sample size	Margin of error	Nikki Haley (R)	Pete Buttigieg (D)	Undecided
SurveyUSA	Oct 15–16, 2019	1,242 (RV)	± 3.9%	24%	44%	32%

with Nikki Haley and Bernie Sanders

Poll source	Date(s) administered	Sample size	Margin of error	Nikki Haley (R)	Bernie Sanders (D)	Undecided
SurveyUSA	Oct 15–16, 2019	1,242 (RV)	± 3.8%	23%	58%	19%
SurveyUSA	Sep 13–15, 2019	1,785 (RV)	± 3.2%	24%	56%	19%

with Nikki Haley and Elizabeth Warren

Poll source	Date(s) administered	Sample size	Margin of error	Nikki Haley (R)	Elizabeth Warren (D)	Undecided
SurveyUSA	Oct 15–16, 2019	1,242 (RV)	± 3.9%	23%	52%	24%
SurveyUSA	Sep 13–15, 2019	1,785 (RV)	± 3.2%	25%	49%	26%

with Mike Pence and Kamala Harris

Poll source	Date(s) administered	Sample size	Margin of error	Mike Pence (R)	Kamala Harris (D)	Undecided
SurveyUSA	Nov 20–22, 2019	2,039 (RV)	± 2.4%	34%	54%	12%
SurveyUSA	Oct 15–16, 2019	1,242 (RV)	± 3.9%	33%	55%	12%
SurveyUSA	Sep 13–15, 2019	1,785 (RV)	± 3.2%	34%	51%	15%

with Mike Pence and Beto O'Rourke

Poll source	Date(s) administered	Sample size	Margin of error	Mike Pence (R)	Beto O'Rourke (D)	Undecided
SurveyUSA	Sep 13–15, 2019	1,785 (RV)	± 3.2%	34%	47%	20%

with Nikki Haley and Kamala Harris

Poll source	Date(s) administered	Sample size	Margin of error	Nikki Haley (R)	Kamala Harris (D)	Undecided
SurveyUSA	Oct 15–16, 2019	1,242 (RV)	± 3.9%	23%	52%	25%
SurveyUSA	Sep 13–15, 2019	1,785 (RV)	± 3.2%	24%	51%	25%

with Nikki Haley and Beto O'Rourke

Poll source	Date(s) administered	Sample size	Margin of error	Nikki Haley (R)	Beto O'Rourke (D)	Undecided
SurveyUSA	Sep 13–15, 2019	1,785 (RV)	± 3.2%	25%	44%	30%

=== Electors ===
Voters in California cast their ballots for members of the Electoral College, called electors, rather than directly for president and vice president. California was allocated 55 electors because it had 53 congressional districts and two senators. All candidates who appear on the ballot must submit a list of 55 electors who pledge to vote for their candidate and their running mate. Whoever wins the most votes in the state is awarded all 55 electoral votes. Their chosen electors then vote for president and vice president. Although electors are pledged to support their party's nominees, they are not obligated to vote for them. An elector who votes for someone other than their party's candidate is known as a faithless elector.

The electors of each state and the District of Columbia met on December 15, 2020, to cast their votes for president and vice president. The Electoral College itself does not meet as one body. Instead, the electors from each state and the District of Columbia met in their respective capitals. All 55 California Democratic electors cast their votes for former Vice President Joe Biden and Senator Kamala Harris from California, as pledged. The electoral vote was tabulated and certified by Congress in a joint session on January 6, 2021, per the Electoral Count Act.

These individuals were nominated by each party to serve as the state's members of the 2020 Electoral College should their party's ticket win the state:

Joe Biden and Kamala Harris Democratic Party	Donald Trump and Mike Pence Republican Party	Rocky De La Fuente and Kanye West American Independent	Howie Hawkins and Angela Walker Green Party	Jo Jorgensen and Spike Cohen Libertarian Party	Gloria La Riva and Sunil Freeman Peace and Freedom
Agustin Arreola; Katherine Bancroft; Kara Bechtle; Brandon Benjamin; Janine Bera; Peter Bolland; Mary Bowker; Janice Brown; Patty Cappelluti; Jacki Cisneros; Marsha Conant; Freddye Davis; Steven Diebert; Emily Dredd; Lee Fink; Bryan Fletcher; Mark Gonzalez; Madeline Handy; Ronald Herrera; Jihee Huh; LaNiece Jones; Elizabeth Kann; David Kennedy; Dona Kerkvliet-Varin; Wallace Knox; Vinzenz Koller; Franklin Lima; Christina Marquez; Paul "Pete" McCloskey; Thomas McInerney; Jillian McNerney; Nelida Mendoza; Betty Monroy; Brock Neeley; Alex Norman; Jane Pandell; Yolanda Parker; William Prady; Andre Quintero; Amy Rao; Kevin Sabellico; Anne Sanger; Mattie Scott; Suzanne Singer; Brian Solecki; Erin Sturdivant; Naomi Tomita; Robert Torres; Catherine Ward; Karen Waters; Shirley Weber; Katherine Wilkinson; Tayte Williams; Rosalind Wyman; Brandon Zavala	Walt Allen; Steven Bailey; Francis Barraza; Randy Berholtz; Sue Blair; Todd Blair; James Bradley; Jim Brulte; Roger Clark; Greg Conlon; John Cox; Matthew Craffey; Marshall Cromer; Harmeet Dhillon; Steve Frank; Ted Gaines; Greg Gandrud; Peggy Grande; Shannon Grove; Mario Guerra; Howard Hakes; Matt Heath; Mark Herrick; Nam-Yong Horn; Dave Huguenel; Darrell Issa; Buck Johns; Kevin Krick; Peter Kuo; Doug LaMalfa; Laine Lansing; Jonathan Madison; Betsy Mahan; Barbara Grimm Marshall; Thomas McKernan; Mark Meuser; Lisa Moreno; Johnnie Morgan; Heather Obernolte; Mike Osborn; Jessica Patterson; Konstantinos Roditis; Matthias Ronnau; Shawn Steel; Lindsey Stetson; Taylor Strand; Duf Sundheim; Peter Verbica; Megan Vincent; Frank Visco; Marie Waldron; John Warner; Deborah Wilder; Dwight Williams; Woody Woodrum	Carlos Heriberto Aleman; Sobeida Aleman; Carlos H. Aleman Gonzalez; Brian Amato; Alejandra Arango; Karen Avakian; Sebastain Azami; Larry Beliz; Josefina Bosdet; Andy Bowen; Fredrick Cains; Michelle Cardin; Jaime Cardona; Gricel Cedillo; Roman Cedillo; Sylvia P. Cedillo; Jossie Cruz; Martha Cuen; Roberto Cuen; Kamila De la Fuente; Michael Dorroz; Wiley Drake; Ron Gold; Jeff Grage; Michelle Griffith; Saryas Jaff; Rachel Keisling; Roy J. Kendall; Eric McDermott; Chavosh Farid Meskarzadeh; Sanaz Kashef Meskarzadeh; Elia Mora; Ingrid Olsen; Rey Olsen; Michael A. Peroutka; Alane Quien; Markham Robinson; Mary Robinson; Alejandra Rodriguez; Jorge A. Saenz; Jorge Saenz; Marissol Saenz; Mark Seidenberg; Sheyla Serrano; Nathan Sorenson; Catherine Stachowiak; Thomas Stachowiak; Marlene Vollbrechthausen; Robert Walters; Joseph Wendt; Bahman Yazdani; Kelly Yazdani; Negar Yazdani; Katayoun Yazdani De la Fuente; Adriana Zamudio	Janet Arnold; William Balderston; Meredith Bates; Gary Blenner; David Bond; Timothy Casebolt; Nicole Castor; Susan Collier Lamont; James Henry Conn; Maxine Daniel; James Doyle; Sanda Everette; Michael Feinstein; John F. Foran Jr.; Ashley Frame; Richard Gomez; Richard Greenblatt; Diane Harrison; Tian Harter; Barry Hermanson; Andrea Houtman; Torger Johnson; Tarik Kanaana; Shlomy Kattan; Tanya Khaledi; Noura Khouri; George Koerner; Peggy Koteen; James Lauderdale; Donald L. Manro; George Marcussen; Michele Mashburn; Charisse Matisz-Cordero; Ann Menasche; Rachel Mohan; David Morrison; Nadia Nouri; Nassim Nouri; Karen Nyhus; Robert Osak; Christine Pepin; Kimberly Phillips; Linda Ray; Justin Richardson; David (Rockello) H. Rosen; Robin Rowe; Michael Rubin; John Scmit; Yusef Shabazz; Barry Sheppard; Dana Silvernale; Mark R. Thomas; Audra Walton; Laura Wells; Geordie Zapalac	Susan L. Aquino; James J. Aragon; Aaron Bonn; Edward M. Bowers; Elizabeth Brierly; Matthew Ryan Butts; Rick Joe Dawson; Joe Dehn; Tracy L. DuPrez; Richard Fast; Tim T.J. Ferreira; Eduardo A. Flores; Terry Floyd; Andrew Forrester; Anthony A. Fratta; June Genis; Mary Therese Gingell; Joel Gompert; James Polin Gray; Steve Bernard Haug; Jane Heider; Jeffery Hewitt; Wendy Hewitt; Linda Ann Hinkle; Mark W. Hinkle; Sandra L. Kallander; Gail K. Lightfoot; Ryan Lopez; Angela Elise McArdle; Doug Morrow; Kalish Morrow; David Naranjo; Brandon Nelson; Rachel Nyx; Avens E. O'Brien; Jillian Michele Olsen; Kenneth B. Olsen; Alicia G. Percell; Jonathan D. Prosser; Jill Pyeatt; Manuel Anthony Robledo; Honor Michelle Robson; Lawrence K. Samuels; Matthew "Boomer" Shannon; Kevin Arthur Shaw; Frederick A. Sorilla; Starchild; Christopher James Stare; Aaron B. Starr; Benjamin Malaki Steele; Vashte Steinbiss; Gaetano Taibi; Paul Vallandigham; Nickolas Wildstar; Tara Young	Meghann Adams; Kevin Akin; Margie Akin; Richard E. Becker; John E. Bergman; Jon Lowell Britton; John Comly; Arthur Covington; Hannah Craig; Broderick Dunlap; Shany Ebadi; Valeria Escandon; Zachary Farber; Mary Lou Finley; Tova Fry; Anne Gamboni; Norma Esthella Garcia; Danny Gresham; Norma Harrison; Nathalie P. Hrizi; Ernesto Huerta; Kameron Hurt; Deborah Jamison; Saul Kanowitz; Jonathan Kim; Derek Krencik; Thomas William Lacey; David Landry; Julie La Riva; Esme Loreto; Abel Macias; Justine Marie Mann; Ian Matthews; Jordan P. Mills; Juliana Musheyev; Susan Muysenberg; Andrew Nance; Sarah Ochoa; Nicolas Pardee; Steven Lawrence Patt; Keith Andrew Pavlik; Adan Plascencia; John Prysner; Debra Reiger; John C. Reiger; Michelle Schudel; Rhianna Shaheen; Cindy Sheehan; Christine Smith; Margaret M. Smith; Alice Marie Stek; Tahnee Stair Sweeney; Maxson Taylor; C. T. Weber; Sheila Xiao

=== Results ===
Biden won California with a smaller margin of victory than Hillary Clinton in 2016. Nevertheless, he performed well in most urban areas of the state. Biden is also the first candidate for any statewide race in American history to receive over ten million votes.

Swing by census block group Biden: >50%; 40–50%; 30–40%; 20–30%; 15–20%; 10–15%; 5–10%; 1–5%; Trump: 1–5%; 5–10%; 10–15%; 15–20%; 20–30%; 30–40%; 40–50%; >50%

2020 United States presidential election in California
Party	Candidate	Votes	%	±%
Democratic	Joe Biden Kamala Harris	11,110,250	63.48%	+1.75%
Republican	Donald Trump Mike Pence	6,006,429	34.32%	+2.70%
Libertarian	Jo Jorgensen Spike Cohen	187,895	1.07%	−2.30%
Green	Howie Hawkins Angela Walker	81,029	0.46%	−1.50%
American Independent	Rocky De La Fuente Kanye West	60,160	0.34%	N/A
Peace and Freedom	Gloria La Riva Sunil Freeman	51,037	0.29%	−0.18%
American Solidarity	Brian T. Carroll Amar Patel (write-in)	2,605	0.01%	−
Independent	Jesse Ventura (write-in)	611	0.00%	N/A
Independent	Mark Charles Adrian Wallace (write-in)	559	0.00%	N/A
Independent	Brock Pierce Karla Ballard (write-in)	185	0.00%	N/A
Socialist Equality	Joseph Kishore Norissa Santa Cruz (write-in)	121	0.00%	N/A
Total votes		17,500,881	100.00%	N/A

==== By county ====
County	Joe Biden Democratic		Donald Trump Republican		Various candidates Other parties		Margin		Total
County	#	%	#	%	#	%	#	%	Total
Alameda	617,659	80.21%	136,309	17.70%	16,102	2.09%	481,350	62.51%	770,070
Alpine	476	64.24%	244	32.93%	21	2.83%	232	31.31%	741
Amador	8,153	36.55%	13,585	60.91%	566	2.54%	-5,432	-24.35%	22,304
Butte	50,426	49.41%	48,730	47.74%	2,910	2.85%	1,696	1.66%	102,066
Calaveras	10,046	36.98%	16,518	60.81%	600	2.21%	-6,472	-23.83%	27,164
Colusa	3,239	40.69%	4,559	57.27%	163	2.05%	-1,320	-16.58%	7,961
Contra Costa	416,386	71.63%	152,877	26.30%	12,053	2.07%	263,509	45.33%	581,316
Del Norte	4,677	40.84%	6,461	56.41%	315	2.75%	-1,784	-15.58%	11,453
El Dorado	51,621	44.44%	61,838	53.24%	2,700	2.32%	-10,217	-8.80%	116,159
Fresno	193,025	52.90%	164,464	45.07%	7,428	2.04%	28,561	7.83%	364,917
Glenn	3,995	35.36%	7,063	62.52%	239	2.12%	-3,068	-27.16%	11,297
Humboldt	44,768	65.03%	21,770	31.62%	2,305	3.35%	22,998	33.41%	68,843
Imperial	34,678	61.11%	20,847	36.74%	1,218	2.15%	13,831	24.37%	56,743
Inyo	4,634	48.86%	4,620	48.71%	230	2.43%	14	0.15%	9,484
Kern	133,366	43.68%	164,484	53.88%	7,442	2.44%	-31,118	-10.19%	305,292
Kings	18,699	42.63%	24,072	54.88%	1,090	2.49%	-5,373	-12.25%	43,861
Lake	14,941	51.86%	13,123	45.55%	748	2.60%	1,818	6.31%	28,812
Lassen	2,799	23.35%	8,970	74.83%	218	1.82%	-6,171	-51.48%	11,987
Los Angeles	3,028,885	71.03%	1,145,530	26.86%	89,950	2.11%	1,883,355	44.16%	4,264,365
Madera	23,168	43.12%	29,378	54.68%	1,186	2.21%	-6,210	-11.56%	53,732
Marin	128,288	82.33%	24,612	15.79%	2,930	1.88%	103,676	66.53%	155,830
Mariposa	4,088	39.77%	5,950	57.88%	242	2.35%	-1,862	-18.11%	10,280
Mendocino	28,782	66.41%	13,267	30.61%	1,291	2.98%	15,515	35.80%	43,340
Merced	48,991	54.10%	39,397	43.51%	2,166	2.39%	9,594	10.59%	90,554
Modoc	1,150	26.48%	3,109	71.59%	84	1.93%	-1,959	-45.11%	4,343
Mono	4,013	59.56%	2,513	37.30%	212	3.15%	1,500	22.26%	6,738
Monterey	113,953	69.52%	46,299	28.24%	3,671	2.24%	67,654	41.27%	163,923
Napa	49,817	69.05%	20,676	28.66%	1,657	2.30%	29,141	40.39%	72,150
Nevada	36,359	56.15%	26,779	41.36%	1,612	2.49%	9,580	14.80%	64,750
Orange	814,009	53.48%	676,498	44.44%	31,606	2.08%	137,511	9.03%	1,522,113
Placer	106,869	45.46%	122,488	52.10%	5,727	2.44%	-15,619	-6.64%	235,084
Plumas	4,561	40.51%	6,445	57.24%	254	2.26%	-1,884	-16.73%	11,260
Riverside	528,340	52.98%	449,144	45.04%	19,672	1.97%	79,196	7.94%	997,156
Sacramento	440,808	61.36%	259,405	36.11%	18,227	2.54%	181,403	25.25%	718,440
San Benito	17,628	61.14%	10,590	36.73%	612	2.12%	7,038	24.41%	28,830
San Bernardino	455,859	54.20%	366,257	43.54%	19,014	2.26%	89,602	10.65%	841,130
San Diego	964,650	60.21%	600,094	37.46%	37,399	2.33%	364,556	22.75%	1,602,143
San Francisco	378,156	85.26%	56,417	12.72%	8,980	2.02%	321,739	72.54%	443,553
San Joaquin	161,137	55.85%	121,098	41.98%	6,257	2.17%	40,039	13.88%	288,492
San Luis Obispo	88,310	55.29%	67,436	42.22%	3,968	2.48%	20,874	13.07%	159,714
San Mateo	291,496	77.89%	75,584	20.20%	7,171	1.92%	215,912	57.69%	374,251
Santa Barbara	129,963	64.87%	65,736	32.81%	4,640	2.32%	64,227	32.06%	200,339
Santa Clara	617,967	72.64%	214,612	25.23%	18,162	2.13%	403,355	47.41%	850,741
Santa Cruz	114,246	78.88%	26,937	18.60%	3,654	2.52%	87,309	60.28%	144,837
Shasta	30,000	32.28%	60,789	65.41%	2,141	2.30%	-30,789	-33.13%	92,930
Sierra	730	37.80%	1,142	59.14%	59	3.06%	-412	-21.34%	1,931
Siskiyou	9,593	40.87%	13,290	56.62%	589	2.51%	-3,697	-15.75%	23,472
Solano	131,639	63.94%	69,306	33.66%	4,932	2.40%	62,333	30.28%	205,877
Sonoma	199,938	74.52%	61,825	23.04%	6,554	2.44%	138,113	51.47%	268,317
Stanislaus	105,841	49.24%	104,145	48.45%	4,968	2.31%	1,696	0.79%	214,954
Sutter	17,367	40.73%	24,375	57.16%	902	2.12%	-7,008	-16.43%	42,644
Tehama	8,911	31.02%	19,141	66.62%	679	2.36%	-10,230	-35.61%	28,731
Trinity	2,851	45.55%	3,188	50.93%	220	3.51%	-337	-5.38%	6,259
Tulare	66,105	45.00%	77,579	52.82%	3,201	2.18%	-11,474	-7.81%	146,885
Tuolumne	11,978	39.39%	17,689	58.17%	741	2.44%	-5,711	-18.78%	30,408
Ventura	251,388	59.45%	162,207	38.36%	9,230	2.18%	89,181	21.09%	422,825
Yolo	67,598	69.48%	27,292	28.05%	2,404	2.47%	40,306	41.43%	97,294
Yuba	11,230	37.69%	17,676	59.32%	890	2.99%	-6,446	-21.63%	29,796
Totals	11,110,250	63.48%	6,006,429	34.32%	384,202	2.20%	5,103,821	29.16%	17,500,881

Counties that flipped from Republican to Democratic

- Inyo (largest municipality: Bishop)
- Butte (largest municipality: Chico)

==== By congressional district ====
Biden won 46 of the 53 congressional districts in California, including four that were flipped or held by Republicans in Congress.

District	Trump	Biden	Representative
1st	56%	41%	Doug LaMalfa
2nd	24%	74%	Jared Huffman
3rd	43%	55%	John Garamendi
4th	54%	44%	Tom McClintock
5th	25%	72%	Mike Thompson
6th	27%	70%	Doris Matsui
7th	42%	56%	Ami Bera
8th	54%	44%	Paul Cook
8th	54%	44%	Jay Obernolte
9th	40%	58%	Jerry McNerney
10th	47%	50%	Josh Harder
11th	24%	74%	Mark DeSaulnier
12th	12%	86%	Nancy Pelosi
13th	9%	89%	Barbara Lee
14th	20%	78%	Jackie Speier
15th	26%	72%	Eric Swalwell
16th	39%	59%	Jim Costa
17th	26%	72%	Ro Khanna
18th	21%	76%	Anna Eshoo
19th	28%	70%	Zoe Lofgren
20th	25%	73%	Jimmy Panetta
21st	44%	54%	TJ Cox
21st	44%	54%	David Valadao
22nd	52%	46%	Devin Nunes
23rd	57%	40%	Kevin McCarthy
24th	37%	61%	Salud Carbajal
25th	44%	54%	Mike Garcia
26th	36%	61%	Julia Brownley
27th	31%	67%	Judy Chu
28th	27%	71%	Adam Schiff
29th	24%	74%	Tony Cárdenas
30th	29%	69%	Brad Sherman
31st	39%	59%	Pete Aguilar
32nd	33%	65%	Grace Napolitano
33rd	29%	69%	Ted Lieu
34th	17%	81%	Jimmy Gomez
35th	33%	65%	Norma Torres
36th	42%	56%	Raul Ruiz
37th	14%	84%	Karen Bass
38th	32%	66%	Linda Sánchez
39th	44%	54%	Gil Cisneros
39th	44%	54%	Young Kim
40th	21%	77%	Lucille Roybal-Allard
41st	36%	62%	Mark Takano
42nd	53%	45%	Ken Calvert
43rd	21%	77%	Maxine Waters
44th	19%	78%	Nanette Barragán
45th	43%	55%	Katie Porter
46th	34%	64%	Lou Correa
47th	35%	62%	Alan Lowenthal
48th	48%	50%	Harley Rouda
48th	48%	50%	Michelle Steel
49th	43%	55%	Mike Levin
50th	53%	45%	Darrell Issa
51st	31%	67%	Juan Vargas
52nd	34%	63%	Scott Peters
53rd	31%	67%	Susan Davis
53rd	31%	67%	Sara Jacobs

==== By city ====
By municipality

Official outcome by city and unincorporated areas of counties, of which Biden won 407 and Trump won 132.
City	County	Joe Biden Democratic		Donald Trump Republican		Various candidates Other parties		Margin		Total Votes	2016 to 2020 Swing %
City	County	#	%	#	%	#	%	#	%	Total Votes	2016 to 2020 Swing %
Alameda	Alameda	36,686	82.94%	6,634	15.00%	911	2.06%	30,052	67.94%	44,231	0.60%
Albany	Alameda	9,639	90.54%	808	7.59%	199	1.87%	8,831	82.95%	10,646	1.27%
Berkeley	Alameda	59,965	93.77%	2,555	4.00%	1,431	2.24%	57,410	89.77%	63,951	2.59%
Dublin	Alameda	21,191	72.86%	7,363	25.32%	530	1.82%	13,828	47.55%	29,084	2.98%
Emeryville	Alameda	5,590	90.79%	461	7.49%	106	1.72%	5,129	83.30%	6,157	0.85%
Fremont	Alameda	68,850	72.95%	23,737	25.15%	1,794	1.90%	45,113	47.80%	94,381	-3.98%
Hayward	Alameda	46,183	77.14%	12,468	20.83%	1,215	2.03%	33,715	56.32%	59,866	-7.94%
Livermore	Alameda	30,344	62.35%	17,130	35.20%	1,193	2.45%	13,214	27.15%	48,667	5.22%
Newark	Alameda	14,603	73.44%	4,932	24.80%	349	1.76%	9,671	48.64%	19,884	-4.03%
Oakland	Alameda	185,441	91.00%	14,089	6.91%	4,245	2.08%	171,352	84.09%	203,775	-0.52%
Piedmont	Alameda	7,035	87.70%	851	10.61%	136	1.70%	6,184	77.09%	8,022	5.01%
Pleasanton	Alameda	28,340	68.45%	12,127	29.29%	934	2.26%	16,213	39.16%	41,401	6.41%
San Leandro	Alameda	30,662	77.03%	8,371	21.03%	774	1.94%	22,291	56.00%	39,807	-6.07%
Union City	Alameda	23,735	75.36%	7,232	22.96%	527	1.67%	16,503	52.40%	31,494	-9.69%
Unincorporated Area	Alameda	49,395	72.11%	17,551	25.62%	1,552	2.27%	31,844	46.49%	68,498	-2.07%
Unincorporated Area	Alpine	476	64.24%	244	32.93%	21	2.83%	232	31.31%	741	11.81%
Amador	Amador	95	62.50%	54	35.53%	3	1.97%	41	26.97%	152	11.40%
Ione	Amador	837	29.60%	1,912	67.61%	79	2.79%	-1,075	-38.01%	2,828	-4.83%
Jackson	Amador	1,077	41.50%	1,435	55.30%	83	3.20%	-358	-13.80%	2,595	0.90%
Plymouth	Amador	223	37.48%	350	58.82%	22	3.70%	-127	-21.34%	595	9.90%
Sutter Creek	Amador	724	44.44%	867	53.22%	38	2.33%	-143	-8.78%	1,629	7.35%
Unincorporated Area	Amador	5,197	35.83%	8,967	61.83%	339	2.34%	-3,770	-25.99%	14,503	1.51%
Biggs	Butte	278	36.25%	472	61.54%	17	2.22%	-194	-25.29%	767	-2.80%
Chico	Butte	30,744	62.07%	17,231	34.79%	1,553	3.14%	13,513	27.28%	49,528	4.75%
Gridley	Butte	1,276	46.55%	1,402	51.15%	63	2.30%	-126	-4.60%	2,741	-1.75%
Oroville	Butte	2,763	40.40%	3,858	56.41%	218	3.19%	-1,095	-16.01%	6,839	1.13%
Paradise	Butte	1,542	37.59%	2,446	59.63%	114	2.78%	-904	-22.04%	4,102	-5.44%
Unincorporated Area	Butte	14,212	36.85%	23,410	60.70%	942	2.44%	-9,198	-23.85%	38,564	-0.27%
Angels	Calaveras	878	39.84%	1,277	57.94%	49	2.22%	-399	-18.10%	2,204	0.87%
Unincorporated Area	Calaveras	9,168	36.73%	15,241	61.06%	551	2.21%	-6,073	-24.33%	24,960	0.28%
Colusa	Colusa	968	39.62%	1,420	58.13%	55	2.25%	-452	-18.50%	2,443	3.52%
Williams	Colusa	849	62.06%	483	35.31%	36	2.63%	366	26.75%	1,368	-9.77%
Unincorporated Area	Colusa	1,422	34.27%	2,656	64.00%	72	1.73%	-1,234	-29.73%	4,150	-6.22%
Antioch	Contra Costa	33,960	71.69%	12,411	26.20%	999	2.11%	21,549	45.49%	47,370	0.81%
Brentwood	Contra Costa	19,580	57.79%	13,591	40.11%	713	2.10%	5,989	17.68%	33,884	4.12%
Clayton	Contra Costa	4,605	60.19%	2,882	37.67%	164	2.14%	1,723	22.52%	7,651	6.50%
Concord	Contra Costa	41,786	69.50%	16,877	28.07%	1,461	2.43%	24,909	41.43%	60,124	2.81%
Danville	Contra Costa	18,297	63.39%	9,993	34.62%	576	2.00%	8,304	28.77%	28,866	5.14%
El Cerrito	Contra Costa	13,712	88.85%	1,443	9.35%	277	1.79%	12,269	79.50%	15,432	0.60%
Hercules	Contra Costa	11,069	78.51%	2,836	20.11%	194	1.38%	8,233	58.39%	14,099	-6.01%
Lafayette	Contra Costa	12,995	76.64%	3,578	21.10%	384	2.26%	9,417	55.53%	16,957	4.49%
Martinez	Contra Costa	15,580	69.44%	6,277	27.97%	581	2.59%	9,303	41.46%	22,438	3.31%
Moraga	Contra Costa	7,760	75.51%	2,286	22.24%	231	2.25%	5,474	53.26%	10,277	7.44%
Oakley	Contra Costa	11,446	57.80%	7,874	39.76%	483	2.44%	3,572	18.04%	19,803	-1.05%
Orinda	Contra Costa	10,435	78.77%	2,561	19.33%	252	1.90%	7,874	59.44%	13,248	5.11%
Pinole	Contra Costa	7,723	75.94%	2,266	22.28%	181	1.78%	5,457	53.66%	10,170	-1.15%
Pittsburg	Contra Costa	22,355	76.41%	6,305	21.55%	596	2.04%	16,050	54.86%	29,256	-4.19%
Pleasant Hill	Contra Costa	14,742	72.96%	4,977	24.63%	486	2.41%	9,765	48.33%	20,205	2.12%
Richmond	Contra Costa	38,784	87.04%	4,966	11.15%	807	1.81%	33,818	75.90%	44,557	-3.18%
San Pablo	Contra Costa	7,652	83.86%	1,300	14.25%	173	1.90%	6,352	69.61%	9,125	-9.90%
San Ramon	Contra Costa	29,397	70.43%	11,553	27.68%	787	1.89%	17,844	42.75%	41,737	3.51%
Walnut Creek	Contra Costa	32,385	74.01%	10,602	24.23%	769	1.76%	21,783	49.78%	43,756	4.60%
Unincorporated Area	Contra Costa	62,123	67.32%	28,299	30.67%	1,853	2.01%	33,824	36.66%	92,275	1.56%
Crescent City	Del Norte	696	49.40%	665	47.20%	48	3.41%	31	2.20%	1,409	3.70%
Unincorporated Area	Del Norte	3,981	39.64%	5,796	57.71%	266	2.65%	-1,815	-18.07%	10,043	1.76%
Placerville	El Dorado	2,792	51.23%	2,509	46.04%	149	2.73%	283	5.19%	5,450	5.26%
South Lake Tahoe	El Dorado	6,359	66.63%	2,941	30.82%	244	2.56%	3,418	35.81%	9,544	7.92%
Unincorporated Area	El Dorado	42,470	41.99%	56,388	55.75%	2,286	2.26%	-13,918	-13.76%	101,144	4.55%
Clovis	Fresno	24,700	41.66%	33,406	56.34%	1,189	2.01%	-8,706	-14.68%	59,295	6.16%
Coalinga	Fresno	1,952	46.33%	2,176	51.65%	85	2.02%	-224	-5.32%	4,213	0.04%
Firebaugh	Fresno	1,342	69.43%	555	28.71%	36	1.86%	787	40.71%	1,933	-5.15%
Fowler	Fresno	1,613	56.80%	1,198	42.18%	29	1.02%	415	14.61%	2,840	-4.56%
Fresno	Fresno	110,511	59.52%	71,147	38.32%	3,997	2.15%	39,364	21.20%	185,655	1.34%
Huron	Fresno	635	81.83%	127	16.37%	14	1.80%	508	65.46%	776	-15.09%
Kerman	Fresno	2,857	59.60%	1,871	39.03%	66	1.38%	986	20.57%	4,794	-5.27%
Kingsburg	Fresno	2,123	32.62%	4,241	65.17%	144	2.21%	-2,118	-32.54%	6,508	3.17%
Mendota	Fresno	1,281	73.45%	442	25.34%	21	1.20%	839	48.11%	1,744	-18.88%
Orange Cove	Fresno	1,367	74.95%	427	23.41%	30	1.64%	940	51.54%	1,824	-16.19%
Parlier	Fresno	2,239	75.74%	667	22.56%	50	1.69%	1,572	53.18%	2,956	-18.38%
Reedley	Fresno	4,203	54.71%	3,334	43.40%	145	1.89%	869	11.31%	7,682	4.01%
San Joaquin	Fresno	538	83.41%	106	16.43%	1	0.16%	432	66.98%	645	-7.33%
Sanger	Fresno	5,465	62.16%	3,181	36.18%	146	1.66%	2,284	25.98%	8,792	-5.31%
Selma	Fresno	4,409	58.99%	2,964	39.66%	101	1.35%	1,445	19.33%	7,474	-3.50%
Unincorporated Area	Fresno	27,790	41.06%	38,622	57.07%	1,266	1.87%	-10,832	-16.01%	67,678	2.42%
Orland	Glenn	1,323	46.26%	1,456	50.91%	81	2.83%	-133	-4.65%	2,860	3.53%
Willows	Glenn	860	36.27%	1,465	61.79%	46	1.94%	-605	-25.52%	2,371	-0.76% (Note: 2016 Supplement to Statement of vote combines vote in Willows with Glenn County's unincorporated area, so this swing% is calculated by combining the 2020 results from Willows and the unincorporated area of Glenn County and comparing them to the combined 2016 vote totals.)
Unincorporated Area	Glenn	1,812	29.90%	4,142	68.34%	107	1.77%	-2,330	-38.44%	6,061	-0.76%
Arcata	Humboldt	8,321	84.47%	1,145	11.62%	385	3.91%	7,176	72.85%	9,851	10.94%
Blue Lake	Humboldt	542	73.64%	174	23.64%	20	2.72%	368	50.00%	736	12.71%
Eureka	Humboldt	8,628	69.06%	3,458	27.68%	408	3.27%	5,170	41.38%	12,494	10.98%
Ferndale	Humboldt	487	52.20%	420	45.02%	26	2.79%	67	7.18%	933	-0.84%
Fortuna	Humboldt	2,549	45.27%	2,887	51.27%	195	3.46%	-338	-6.00%	5,631	2.96%
Rio Dell	Humboldt	556	40.76%	767	56.23%	41	3.01%	-211	-15.47%	1,364	-1.82%
Trinidad	Humboldt	214	80.45%	45	16.92%	7	2.63%	169	63.53%	266	9.50%
Unincorporated Area	Humboldt	23,471	62.50%	12,874	34.28%	1,208	3.22%	10,597	28.22%	37,553	7.44%
Brawley	Imperial	4,932	58.24%	3,363	39.71%	174	2.05%	1,569	18.53%	8,469	-11.59%
Calexico	Imperial	9,270	71.52%	3,392	26.17%	300	2.31%	5,878	45.35%	12,962	-31.16%
Calipatria	Imperial	549	61.07%	328	36.48%	22	2.45%	221	24.58%	899	-14.20%
El Centro	Imperial	9,390	62.90%	5,237	35.08%	301	2.02%	4,153	27.82%	14,928	-14.98%
Holtville	Imperial	1,140	60.54%	712	37.81%	31	1.65%	428	22.73%	1,883	-12.68%
Imperial	Imperial	4,068	53.53%	3,367	44.31%	164	2.16%	701	9.22%	7,599	-7.04%
Westmorland	Imperial	334	65.75%	162	31.89%	12	2.36%	172	33.86%	508	-15.02%
Unincorporated Area	Imperial	4,995	52.75%	4,286	45.26%	189	2.00%	709	7.49%	9,470	-10.53%
Bishop	Inyo	1,000	56.82%	704	40.00%	56	3.18%	296	16.82%	1,760	15.49%
Unincorporated Area	Inyo	3,634	47.07%	3,916	50.72%	171	2.21%	-282	-3.65%	7,721	13.08%
Arvin	Kern	2,382	74.41%	745	23.27%	74	2.31%	1,637	51.14%	3,201	-13.27%
Bakersfield	Kern	69,876	47.26%	74,548	50.42%	3,421	2.31%	-4,672	-3.16%	147,845	3.20%
California City	Kern	2,129	46.52%	2,314	50.56%	134	2.93%	-185	-4.04%	4,577	13.12%
Delano	Kern	6,754	67.92%	3,014	30.31%	176	1.77%	3,740	37.61%	9,944	-18.75%
Maricopa	Kern	68	17.80%	306	80.10%	8	2.09%	-238	-62.30%	382	8.49%
McFarland	Kern	1,827	71.42%	664	25.96%	67	2.62%	1,163	45.47%	2,558	-13.63%
Ridgecrest	Kern	4,570	35.51%	7,713	59.93%	586	4.55%	-3,143	-24.42%	12,869	5.94%
Shafter	Kern	2,625	49.53%	2,566	48.42%	109	2.06%	59	1.11%	5,300	-11.98%
Taft	Kern	461	18.45%	1,985	79.46%	52	2.08%	-1,524	-61.01%	2,498	2.56%
Tehachapi	Kern	1,230	34.00%	2,286	63.18%	102	2.82%	-1,056	-29.19%	3,618	5.34%
Wasco	Kern	2,832	56.57%	2,054	41.03%	120	2.40%	778	15.54%	5,006	-13.65%
Unincorporated Area	Kern	38,612	35.94%	66,289	61.71%	2,527	2.35%	-27,677	-25.76%	107,428	3.00%
Avenal	Kings	905	64.83%	440	31.52%	51	3.65%	465	33.31%	1,396	-15.38%
Corcoran	Kings	1,914	55.22%	1,480	42.70%	72	2.08%	434	12.52%	3,466	-15.68%
Hanford	Kings	10,393	42.65%	13,386	54.93%	589	2.42%	-2,993	-12.28%	24,368	1.98%
Lemoore	Kings	3,860	41.67%	5,148	55.58%	255	2.75%	-1,288	-13.90%	9,263	4.36%
Unincorporated Area	Kings	1,627	30.33%	3,618	67.44%	120	2.24%	-1,991	-37.11%	5,365	-8.27%
Clearlake	Lake	2,615	55.27%	1,968	41.60%	148	3.13%	647	13.68%	4,731	-0.46%
Lakeport	Lake	1,306	52.98%	1,102	44.71%	57	2.31%	204	8.28%	2,465	1.64%
Unincorporated Area	Lake	11,020	51.01%	10,053	46.53%	531	2.46%	967	4.48%	21,604	3.39%
Susanville	Lassen	1,092	27.31%	2,814	70.37%	93	2.33%	-1,722	-43.06%	3,999	-1.12%
Unincorporated Area	Lassen	1,707	21.37%	6,156	77.08%	123	1.54%	-4,449	-55.71%	7,986	0.15%
Agoura Hills	Los Angeles	8,316	63.17%	4,611	35.03%	237	1.80%	3,705	28.14%	13,164	3.75%
Alhambra	Los Angeles	24,393	70.75%	9,454	27.42%	630	1.83%	14,939	43.33%	34,477	-7.02%
Arcadia	Los Angeles	14,831	59.58%	9,603	38.58%	457	1.84%	5,228	21.00%	24,891	1.64%
Artesia	Los Angeles	3,930	61.69%	2,310	36.26%	131	2.06%	1,620	25.43%	6,371	-13.65%
Avalon	Los Angeles	856	59.40%	546	37.89%	39	2.71%	310	21.51%	1,441	9.88%
Azusa	Los Angeles	11,965	66.72%	5,553	30.97%	415	2.31%	6,412	35.76%	17,933	-5.59%
Baldwin Park	Los Angeles	17,656	73.61%	5,836	24.33%	494	2.06%	11,820	49.28%	23,986	-15.70%
Bell	Los Angeles	7,382	78.94%	1,724	18.44%	245	2.62%	5,658	60.51%	9,351	-15.97%
Bell Gardens	Los Angeles	8,202	79.68%	1,856	18.03%	236	2.29%	6,346	61.65%	10,294	-17.67%
Bellflower	Los Angeles	19,875	67.15%	9,006	30.43%	716	2.42%	10,869	36.72%	29,597	-7.64%
Beverly Hills	Los Angeles	10,453	55.07%	8,325	43.86%	203	1.07%	2,128	11.21%	18,981	-19.97%
Bradbury	Los Angeles	334	51.70%	303	46.90%	9	1.39%	31	4.80%	646	5.59%
Burbank	Los Angeles	39,375	67.63%	17,672	30.35%	1,173	2.01%	21,703	37.28%	58,220	-1.81%
Calabasas	Los Angeles	9,146	63.75%	4,952	34.52%	249	1.74%	4,194	29.23%	14,347	-1.06%
Carson	Los Angeles	33,967	75.09%	10,441	23.08%	828	1.83%	23,526	52.01%	45,236	-10.79%
Cerritos	Los Angeles	17,506	62.49%	10,035	35.82%	473	1.69%	7,471	26.67%	28,014	-4.46%
Claremont	Los Angeles	13,346	68.07%	5,849	29.83%	412	2.10%	7,497	38.24%	19,607	1.94%
Commerce	Los Angeles	3,984	78.35%	985	19.37%	116	2.28%	2,999	58.98%	5,085	-12.34%
Compton	Los Angeles	26,184	86.58%	3,327	11.00%	731	2.42%	22,857	75.58%	30,242	-11.87%
Covina	Los Angeles	14,289	60.91%	8,667	36.95%	502	2.14%	5,622	23.97%	23,458	-1.00%
Cudahy	Los Angeles	4,351	80.01%	922	16.95%	165	3.03%	3,429	63.06%	5,438	-16.53%
Culver City	Los Angeles	20,455	83.25%	3,645	14.83%	472	1.92%	16,810	68.41%	24,572	1.51%
Diamond Bar	Los Angeles	15,894	58.92%	10,666	39.54%	417	1.55%	5,228	19.38%	26,977	-2.14%
Downey	Los Angeles	32,211	66.50%	15,203	31.39%	1,023	2.11%	17,008	35.11%	48,437	-9.08%
Duarte	Los Angeles	7,005	67.07%	3,238	31.00%	202	1.93%	3,767	36.07%	10,445	-3.21%
El Monte	Los Angeles	21,028	70.28%	8,351	27.91%	541	1.81%	12,677	42.37%	29,920	-17.96%
El Segundo	Los Angeles	6,810	63.59%	3,637	33.96%	262	2.45%	3,173	29.63%	10,709	6.47%
Gardena	Los Angeles	19,411	75.67%	5,784	22.55%	457	1.78%	13,627	53.12%	25,652	-9.96%
Glendale	Los Angeles	50,515	58.93%	33,610	39.21%	1,591	1.86%	16,905	19.72%	85,716	-11.04%
Glendora	Los Angeles	14,075	48.58%	14,229	49.12%	666	2.30%	-154	-0.53%	28,970	5.82%
Hawaiian Gardens	Los Angeles	2,996	72.11%	1,051	25.29%	108	2.60%	1,945	46.81%	4,155	-15.92%
Hawthorne	Los Angeles	25,126	78.28%	6,223	19.39%	749	2.33%	18,903	58.89%	32,098	-9.35%
Hermosa Beach	Los Angeles	8,863	69.35%	3,564	27.89%	353	2.76%	5,299	41.46%	12,780	4.91%
Hidden Hills	Los Angeles	707	58.33%	487	40.18%	18	1.49%	220	18.15%	1,212	-3.10%
Huntington Park	Los Angeles	11,596	80.56%	2,503	17.39%	295	2.05%	9,093	63.17%	14,394	-16.20%
Industry	Los Angeles	40	45.45%	41	46.59%	7	7.95%	-1	-1.14%	88	-22.30%
Inglewood	Los Angeles	41,124	88.62%	4,437	9.56%	846	1.82%	36,687	79.05%	46,407	-6.85%
Irwindale	Los Angeles	561	69.60%	236	29.28%	9	1.12%	325	40.32%	806	-10.61%
La Canada Flintridge	Los Angeles	8,259	62.18%	4,805	36.18%	218	1.64%	3,454	26.01%	13,282	6.12%
La Habra Heights	Los Angeles	1,451	43.77%	1,802	54.36%	62	1.87%	-351	-10.59%	3,315	6.24%
La Mirada	Los Angeles	13,315	53.47%	11,100	44.57%	488	1.96%	2,215	8.89%	24,903	-1.36%
La Puente	Los Angeles	9,723	73.23%	3,224	24.28%	331	2.49%	6,499	48.95%	13,278	-13.96%
La Verne	Los Angeles	9,627	50.53%	9,053	47.52%	372	1.95%	574	3.01%	19,052	3.71%
Lakewood	Los Angeles	26,535	60.37%	16,460	37.45%	959	2.18%	10,075	22.92%	43,954	1.02%
Lancaster	Los Angeles	36,973	57.71%	25,329	39.54%	1,761	2.75%	11,644	18.18%	64,063	5.88%
Lawndale	Los Angeles	8,526	72.35%	2,981	25.30%	277	2.35%	5,545	47.06%	11,784	-11.08%
Lomita	Los Angeles	5,823	58.46%	3,871	38.86%	267	2.68%	1,952	19.60%	9,961	1.41%
Long Beach	Los Angeles	145,881	72.49%	50,336	25.01%	5,038	2.50%	95,545	47.47%	201,255	-0.68%
Los Angeles	Los Angeles	1,223,737	76.56%	342,545	21.43%	32,196	2.01%	881,192	55.13%	1,598,478	-6.96%
Lynwood	Los Angeles	15,984	82.00%	2,944	15.10%	564	2.89%	13,040	66.90%	19,492	-16.71%
Malibu	Los Angeles	4,585	66.20%	2,206	31.85%	135	1.95%	2,379	34.35%	6,926	0.04%
Manhattan Beach	Los Angeles	15,331	66.43%	7,186	31.14%	563	2.44%	8,145	35.29%	23,080	3.52%
Maywood	Los Angeles	5,468	80.02%	1,175	17.20%	190	2.78%	4,293	62.83%	6,833	-17.33%
Monrovia	Los Angeles	12,723	65.86%	6,126	31.71%	470	2.43%	6,597	34.15%	19,319	3.00%
Montebello	Los Angeles	18,283	73.96%	5,914	23.92%	522	2.11%	12,369	50.04%	24,719	-9.61%
Monterey Park	Los Angeles	15,808	68.09%	7,027	30.27%	380	1.64%	8,781	37.82%	23,215	-7.67%
Norwalk	Los Angeles	28,848	69.27%	11,834	28.42%	961	2.31%	17,014	40.86%	41,643	-11.78%
Palmdale	Los Angeles	39,412	63.14%	21,571	34.56%	1,441	2.31%	17,841	28.58%	62,424	-1.53%
Palos Verdes Estates	Los Angeles	5,123	54.84%	4,011	42.94%	208	2.23%	1,112	11.90%	9,342	6.41%
Paramount	Los Angeles	12,974	78.32%	3,170	19.14%	421	2.54%	9,804	59.19%	16,565	-14.42%
Pasadena	Los Angeles	56,159	77.00%	15,202	20.84%	1,572	2.16%	40,957	56.16%	72,933	0.07%
Pico Rivera	Los Angeles	20,373	74.81%	6,329	23.24%	531	1.95%	14,044	51.57%	27,233	-12.13%
Pomona	Los Angeles	35,302	70.82%	13,280	26.64%	1,264	2.54%	22,022	44.18%	49,846	-9.32%
Rancho Palos Verdes	Los Angeles	14,978	57.65%	10,432	40.15%	570	2.19%	4,546	17.50%	25,980	6.40%
Redondo Beach	Los Angeles	27,833	67.29%	12,461	30.13%	1,067	2.58%	15,372	37.17%	41,361	5.47%
Rolling Hills	Los Angeles	567	43.02%	723	54.86%	28	2.12%	-156	-11.84%	1,318	11.76%
Rolling Hills Estates	Los Angeles	2,984	55.61%	2,285	42.58%	97	1.81%	699	13.03%	5,366	8.24%
Rosemead	Los Angeles	11,036	66.91%	5,216	31.62%	242	1.47%	5,820	35.29%	16,494	-19.94%
San Dimas	Los Angeles	9,694	50.27%	9,192	47.67%	396	2.05%	502	2.60%	19,282	1.66%
San Fernando	Los Angeles	6,689	76.59%	1,838	21.05%	206	2.36%	4,851	55.55%	8,733	-11.57%
San Gabriel	Los Angeles	9,651	66.01%	4,690	32.08%	280	1.92%	4,961	33.93%	14,621	-7.53%
San Marino	Los Angeles	4,353	59.26%	2,844	38.71%	149	2.03%	1,509	20.54%	7,346	5.00%
Santa Clarita	Los Angeles	63,507	53.07%	53,768	44.93%	2,388	2.00%	9,739	8.14%	119,663	4.94%
Santa Fe Springs	Los Angeles	5,849	67.71%	2,576	29.82%	213	2.47%	3,273	37.89%	8,638	-11.32%
Santa Monica	Los Angeles	45,818	81.45%	9,431	16.76%	1,007	1.79%	36,387	64.68%	56,256	-1.08%
Sierra Madre	Los Angeles	4,868	65.89%	2,331	31.55%	189	2.56%	2,537	34.34%	7,388	5.86%
Signal Hill	Los Angeles	4,079	73.46%	1,347	24.26%	127	2.29%	2,732	49.20%	5,553	1.45%
South El Monte	Los Angeles	4,520	73.52%	1,464	23.81%	164	2.67%	3,056	49.71%	6,148	-18.53%
South Gate	Los Angeles	24,089	78.58%	5,849	19.08%	719	2.35%	18,240	59.50%	30,657	-15.62%
South Pasadena	Los Angeles	12,246	78.98%	2,915	18.80%	345	2.22%	9,331	60.18%	15,506	3.84%
Temple City	Los Angeles	10,037	59.98%	6,399	38.24%	297	1.77%	3,638	21.74%	16,733	-1.88%
Torrance	Los Angeles	46,198	60.23%	28,787	37.53%	1,723	2.25%	17,411	22.70%	76,708	3.27%
Vernon	Los Angeles	66	68.04%	31	31.96%	0	0.00%	35	36.08%	97	-20.17%
Walnut	Los Angeles	9,332	61.51%	5,620	37.04%	220	1.45%	3,712	24.47%	15,172	-4.44%
West Covina	Los Angeles	31,003	65.01%	15,848	33.23%	842	1.77%	15,155	31.78%	47,693	-6.67%
West Hollywood	Los Angeles	18,646	82.20%	3,724	16.42%	313	1.38%	14,922	65.78%	22,683	-6.75%
Westlake Village	Los Angeles	3,239	57.51%	2,278	40.45%	115	2.04%	961	17.06%	5,632	4.78%
Whittier	Los Angeles	26,822	62.74%	14,968	35.01%	958	2.24%	11,854	27.73%	42,748	-0.50%
Unincorporated Area	Los Angeles	285,800	68.92%	120,150	28.98%	8,705	2.10%	165,650	39.95%	414,655	-5.05%
Chowchilla	Madera	1,662	37.73%	2,655	60.27%	88	2.00%	-993	-22.54%	4,405	0.33%
Madera	Madera	9,341	57.65%	6,460	39.87%	401	2.48%	2,881	17.78%	16,202	-0.99%
Unincorporated Area	Madera	12,165	36.74%	20,263	61.19%	687	2.07%	-8,098	-24.45%	33,115	4.16%
Belvedere	Marin	1,046	74.93%	320	22.92%	30	2.15%	726	52.01%	1,396	4.25%
Corte Madera	Marin	5,483	84.78%	857	13.25%	127	1.96%	4,626	71.53%	6,467	2.09%
Fairfax	Marin	4,895	90.03%	437	8.04%	105	1.93%	4,458	81.99%	5,437	4.19%
Larkspur	Marin	7,229	84.15%	1,228	14.29%	134	1.56%	6,001	69.85%	8,591	4.44%
Mill Valley	Marin	8,920	90.03%	847	8.55%	141	1.42%	8,073	81.48%	9,908	2.88%
Novato	Marin	22,537	75.10%	6,871	22.90%	601	2.00%	15,666	52.20%	30,009	3.89%
Ross	Marin	1,201	79.07%	289	19.03%	29	1.91%	912	60.04%	1,519	7.32%
San Anselmo	Marin	7,690	87.74%	921	10.51%	154	1.76%	6,769	77.23%	8,765	1.48%
San Rafael	Marin	24,456	82.62%	4,609	15.57%	537	1.81%	19,847	67.05%	29,602	3.13%
Sausalito	Marin	4,576	85.26%	700	13.04%	91	1.70%	3,876	72.22%	5,367	4.51%
Tiburon	Marin	4,831	79.11%	1,145	18.75%	131	2.15%	3,686	60.36%	6,107	4.63%
Unincorporated Area	Marin	35,424	83.09%	6,388	14.98%	821	1.93%	29,036	68.11%	42,633	4.06%
Unincorporated Area	Mariposa	4,088	39.77%	5,950	57.88%	242	2.35%	-1,862	-18.11%	10,280	5.13%
Fort Bragg	Mendocino	2,299	72.23%	805	25.29%	79	2.48%	1,494	46.94%	3,183	5.58%
Point Arena	Mendocino	204	86.81%	25	10.64%	6	2.55%	179	76.17%	235	15.97%
Ukiah	Mendocino	4,577	65.91%	2,148	30.93%	219	3.15%	2,429	34.98%	6,944	4.04%
Willits	Mendocino	1,330	62.74%	719	33.92%	71	3.35%	611	28.82%	2,120	5.41%
Unincorporated Area	Mendocino	20,372	66.03%	9,570	31.02%	911	2.95%	10,802	35.01%	30,853	5.29%
Atwater	Merced (Note: Biden's vote total for Merced County and statewide is 1 vote higher than his total in the official county and state results. This is the result of an apparent tubulation error from California's Supplement to Statement of Vote, where Biden's combined official city vote totals in Merced County add up to 1 vote more than his official county vote total.)	5,553	50.86%	5,091	46.63%	275	2.52%	462	4.23%	10,919	1.84%
Dos Palos	Merced	896	50.88%	835	47.42%	30	1.70%	61	3.46%	1,761	-2.26%
Gustine	Merced	993	48.84%	992	48.79%	48	2.36%	1	0.05%	2,033	-1.64%
Livingston	Merced	3,079	71.31%	1,120	25.94%	119	2.76%	1,959	45.37%	4,318	-19.45%
Los Banos	Merced	8,526	61.47%	5,034	36.29%	311	2.24%	3,492	25.17%	13,871	0.44%
Merced	Merced	17,058	60.45%	10,405	36.87%	757	2.68%	6,653	23.58%	28,220	0.89%
Unincorporated Area	Merced	12,887	43.80%	15,920	54.11%	613	2.08%	-3,033	-10.31%	29,420	-5.46%
Alturas	Modoc	363	30.95%	778	66.33%	32	2.73%	-415	-35.38%	1,173	5.01%
Unincorporated Area	Modoc	787	24.87%	2,331	73.65%	47	1.48%	-1,544	-48.78%	3,165	2.40%
Mammoth Lakes	Mono	2,350	68.33%	988	28.73%	101	2.94%	1,362	39.60%	3,439	8.55%
Unincorporated Area	Mono	1,663	50.42%	1,525	46.24%	110	3.34%	138	4.18%	3,298	9.47%
Carmel-by-the-Sea	Monterey	1,646	68.67%	711	29.66%	40	1.67%	935	39.01%	2,397	5.80%
Del Rey Oaks	Monterey	727	66.45%	342	31.26%	25	2.29%	385	35.19%	1,094	-1.30%
Gonzales	Monterey	1,901	74.61%	592	23.23%	55	2.16%	1,309	51.37%	2,548	-12.07%
Greenfield	Monterey	3,005	79.00%	706	18.56%	93	2.44%	2,299	60.44%	3,804	-5.62%
King City	Monterey	1,721	66.83%	786	30.52%	68	2.64%	935	36.31%	2,575	-8.49%
Marina	Monterey	6,886	69.97%	2,686	27.29%	270	2.74%	4,200	42.67%	9,842	1.51%
Monterey	Monterey	10,474	72.88%	3,565	24.81%	332	2.31%	6,909	48.08%	14,371	3.26%
Pacific Grove	Monterey	7,298	76.42%	2,066	21.63%	186	1.95%	5,232	54.79%	9,550	5.41%
Salinas	Monterey	34,329	72.54%	12,016	25.39%	978	2.07%	22,313	47.15%	47,323	-3.34%
Sand City	Monterey	125	62.50%	67	33.50%	8	4.00%	58	29.00%	200	-2.41%
Seaside	Monterey	8,637	73.21%	2,843	24.10%	318	2.70%	5,794	49.11%	11,798	-1.50%
Soledad	Monterey	4,035	75.69%	1,171	21.97%	125	2.34%	2,864	53.72%	5,331	-12.07%
Unincorporated Area	Monterey	33,169	62.52%	18,748	35.34%	1,133	2.14%	14,421	27.18%	53,050	2.99%
American Canyon	Napa	7,453	71.41%	2,783	26.66%	201	1.93%	4,670	44.74%	10,437	-4.09%
Calistoga	Napa	1,777	77.53%	464	20.24%	51	2.23%	1,313	57.29%	2,292	5.90%
Napa	Napa	28,545	70.13%	11,223	27.57%	933	2.29%	17,322	42.56%	40,701	5.40%
St. Helena	Napa	2,409	75.21%	729	22.76%	65	2.03%	1,680	52.45%	3,203	5.17%
Yountville	Napa	1,198	69.73%	496	28.87%	24	1.40%	702	40.86%	1,718	4.43%
Unincorporated Area	Napa	8,435	61.25%	4,981	36.17%	355	2.58%	3,454	25.08%	13,771	5.01%
Grass Valley	Nevada	4,038	57.93%	2,750	39.45%	182	2.61%	1,288	18.48%	6,970	8.17%
Nevada City	Nevada	1,652	76.02%	458	21.08%	63	2.90%	1,194	54.95%	2,173	10.72%
Truckee	Nevada	7,459	75.32%	2,202	22.24%	242	2.44%	5,257	53.08%	9,903	12.59%
Unincorporated Area	Nevada	23,210	50.80%	21,369	46.77%	1,113	2.44%	1,841	4.03%	45,692	9.21%
Aliso Viejo	Orange	15,754	56.50%	11,519	41.31%	611	2.19%	4,235	15.19%	27,884	4.44%
Anaheim	Orange	77,895	58.67%	52,124	39.26%	2,759	2.08%	25,771	19.41%	132,778	-3.30%
Brea	Orange	12,801	50.53%	12,046	47.55%	487	1.92%	755	2.98%	25,334	6.64%
Buena Park	Orange	19,527	56.53%	14,337	41.50%	680	1.97%	5,190	15.02%	34,544	-4.90%
Costa Mesa	Orange	29,804	56.03%	22,056	41.46%	1,337	2.51%	7,748	14.56%	53,197	4.25%
Cypress	Orange	13,827	53.23%	11,612	44.70%	536	2.06%	2,215	8.53%	25,975	2.27%
Dana Point	Orange	10,102	47.36%	10,816	50.71%	413	1.94%	-714	-3.35%	21,331	4.97%
Fountain Valley	Orange	15,109	47.13%	16,349	50.99%	603	1.88%	-1,240	-3.87%	32,061	-4.18%
Fullerton	Orange	36,693	57.37%	25,725	40.22%	1,545	2.42%	10,968	17.15%	63,963	2.54%
Garden Grove	Orange	34,753	49.67%	33,989	48.58%	1,222	1.75%	764	1.09%	69,964	-21.88%
Huntington Beach	Orange	55,481	47.25%	59,279	50.48%	2,664	2.27%	-3,798	-3.23%	117,424	3.19%
Irvine	Orange	82,067	65.06%	42,832	33.96%	1,232	0.98%	39,235	31.11%	126,131	1.57%
La Habra	Orange	15,409	56.35%	11,343	41.48%	593	2.17%	4,066	14.87%	27,345	0.88%
La Palma	Orange	4,645	55.94%	3,522	42.42%	136	1.64%	1,123	13.53%	8,303	0.45%
Laguna Beach	Orange	10,377	63.48%	5,670	34.69%	300	1.84%	4,707	28.79%	16,347	2.78%
Laguna Hills	Orange	9,129	51.98%	8,102	46.13%	331	1.88%	1,027	5.85%	17,562	7.23%
Laguna Niguel	Orange	20,469	51.42%	18,596	46.72%	741	1.86%	1,873	4.71%	39,806	6.44%
Laguna Woods	Orange	7,496	54.76%	6,069	44.33%	125	0.91%	1,427	10.42%	13,690	3.84%
Lake Forest	Orange	23,810	52.40%	20,638	45.42%	989	2.18%	3,172	6.98%	45,437	7.74%
Los Alamitos	Orange	3,192	51.63%	2,828	45.75%	162	2.62%	364	5.89%	6,182	3.84%
Mission Viejo	Orange	28,983	49.97%	27,837	48.00%	1,179	2.03%	1,146	1.98%	57,999	8.02%
Newport Beach	Orange	24,111	44.16%	29,477	53.98%	1,017	1.86%	-5,366	-9.83%	54,605	4.36%
Orange	Orange	34,851	52.46%	30,025	45.20%	1,553	2.34%	4,826	7.26%	66,429	4.55%
Placentia	Orange	13,616	51.83%	12,135	46.19%	521	1.98%	1,481	5.64%	26,272	5.57%
Rancho Santa Margarita	Orange	13,310	47.92%	13,857	49.89%	609	2.19%	-547	-1.97%	27,776	5.59%
San Clemente	Orange	17,346	44.05%	21,239	53.94%	791	2.01%	-3,893	-9.89%	39,376	4.65%
San Juan Capistrano	Orange	9,041	47.36%	9,720	50.91%	330	1.73%	-679	-3.56%	19,091	6.18%
Santa Ana	Orange	64,645	68.43%	27,887	29.52%	1,938	2.05%	36,758	38.91%	94,470	-13.91%
Seal Beach	Orange	8,793	50.38%	8,400	48.12%	262	1.50%	393	2.25%	17,455	1.80%
Stanton	Orange	7,557	56.25%	5,625	41.87%	252	1.88%	1,932	14.38%	13,434	-17.86%
Tustin	Orange	21,096	60.82%	12,804	36.91%	787	2.27%	8,292	23.91%	34,687	3.32%
Villa Park	Orange	1,573	37.91%	2,495	60.13%	81	1.95%	-922	-22.22%	4,149	9.35%
Westminster	Orange	18,738	44.67%	22,577	53.82%	635	1.51%	-3,839	-9.15%	41,950	-24.63%
Yorba Linda	Orange	17,191	40.34%	24,646	57.83%	783	1.84%	-7,455	-17.49%	42,620	6.72%
Unincorporated Area	Orange	34,818	46.58%	38,322	51.27%	1,607	2.15%	-3,504	-4.69%	74,747	4.49%
Auburn	Placer	4,523	51.59%	4,001	45.64%	243	2.77%	522	5.95%	8,767	3.50%
Colfax	Placer	436	44.35%	516	52.49%	31	3.15%	-80	-8.14%	983	9.01%
Lincoln	Placer	12,805	43.55%	15,992	54.39%	608	2.07%	-3,187	-10.84%	29,405	5.17%
Loomis	Placer	1,493	34.73%	2,688	62.53%	118	2.74%	-1,195	-27.80%	4,299	2.52%
Rocklin	Placer	18,160	46.26%	20,080	51.15%	1,016	2.59%	-1,920	-4.89%	39,256	5.94%
Roseville	Placer	39,049	48.10%	40,191	49.51%	1,938	2.39%	-1,142	-1.41%	81,178	5.47%
Unincorporated Area	Placer	30,403	42.74%	39,020	54.86%	1,706	2.40%	-8,617	-12.11%	71,129	4.64%
Portola	Plumas	382	41.08%	522	56.13%	26	2.80%	-140	-15.05%	930	0.15%
Unincorporated Area	Plumas	4,179	40.47%	5,923	57.36%	224	2.17%	-1,744	-16.89%	10,326	4.22%
Banning	Riverside	6,312	50.20%	6,006	47.77%	255	2.03%	306	2.43%	12,573	5.38%
Beaumont	Riverside	11,654	48.27%	11,995	49.68%	495	2.05%	-341	-1.41%	24,144	5.09%
Blythe	Riverside	1,694	44.20%	2,046	53.38%	93	2.43%	-352	-9.18%	3,833	-6.46%
Calimesa	Riverside	1,968	34.71%	3,586	63.25%	116	2.05%	-1,618	-28.54%	5,670	3.18%
Canyon Lake	Riverside	1,655	23.54%	5,298	75.34%	79	1.12%	-3,643	-51.81%	7,032	1.27%
Cathedral City	Riverside	14,568	70.43%	5,828	28.18%	289	1.40%	8,740	42.25%	20,685	4.07%
Coachella	Riverside	7,948	78.11%	2,008	19.73%	220	2.16%	5,940	58.37%	10,176	-17.00%
Corona	Riverside	35,964	51.53%	32,299	46.28%	1,528	2.19%	3,665	5.25%	69,791	1.97%
Desert Hot Springs	Riverside	5,899	63.84%	3,123	33.80%	218	2.36%	2,776	30.04%	9,240	1.86%
Eastvale	Riverside	16,340	54.27%	13,276	44.09%	494	1.64%	3,064	10.18%	30,110	-5.03%
Hemet	Riverside	16,372	49.26%	16,224	48.81%	642	1.93%	148	0.45%	33,238	9.31%
Indian Wells	Riverside	1,150	38.96%	1,761	59.65%	41	1.39%	-611	-20.70%	2,952	13.67%
Indio	Riverside	19,832	60.00%	12,721	38.49%	501	1.52%	7,111	21.51%	33,054	-0.89%
Jurupa Valley	Riverside	21,046	57.81%	14,584	40.06%	777	2.13%	6,462	17.75%	36,407	-2.78%
La Quinta	Riverside	10,459	50.19%	10,052	48.23%	329	1.58%	407	1.95%	20,840	8.61%
Lake Elsinore	Riverside	13,303	49.70%	12,952	48.39%	512	1.91%	351	1.31%	26,767	3.50%
Menifee	Riverside	22,128	43.57%	27,789	54.71%	876	1.72%	-5,661	-11.15%	50,793	6.82%
Moreno Valley	Riverside	48,360	67.24%	22,148	30.80%	1,412	1.96%	26,212	36.45%	71,920	-3.69%
Murrieta	Riverside	23,184	42.46%	30,316	55.52%	1,103	2.02%	-7,132	-13.06%	54,603	8.07%
Norco	Riverside	3,754	30.56%	8,296	67.52%	236	1.92%	-4,542	-36.97%	12,286	-0.58%
Palm Desert	Riverside	14,841	53.05%	12,715	45.45%	421	1.50%	2,126	7.60%	27,977	9.60%
Palm Springs	Riverside	20,066	77.54%	5,551	21.45%	262	1.01%	14,515	56.09%	25,879	8.77%
Perris	Riverside	15,588	70.78%	5,980	27.15%	455	2.07%	9,608	43.63%	22,023	-12.50%
Rancho Mirage	Riverside	6,481	57.81%	4,617	41.18%	113	1.01%	1,864	16.63%	11,211	13.84%
Riverside	Riverside	71,617	58.60%	47,759	39.08%	2,843	2.33%	23,858	19.52%	122,219	0.31%
San Jacinto	Riverside	9,315	54.53%	7,323	42.87%	444	2.60%	1,992	11.66%	17,082	0.68%
Temecula	Riverside	24,734	44.96%	28,947	52.62%	1,328	2.41%	-4,213	-7.66%	55,009	9.83%
Wildomar	Riverside	6,502	38.84%	9,902	59.15%	337	2.01%	-3,400	-20.31%	16,741	2.23%
Unincorporated Area	Riverside	75,606	46.45%	84,042	51.64%	3,104	1.91%	-8,436	-5.18%	162,752	4.29%
Citrus Heights	Sacramento	19,564	46.20%	21,556	50.91%	1,225	2.89%	-1,992	-4.70%	42,345	3.74%
Elk Grove	Sacramento	55,519	62.51%	31,468	35.43%	1,826	2.06%	24,051	27.08%	88,813	-0.11%
Folsom	Sacramento	22,254	52.17%	19,303	45.25%	1,099	2.58%	2,951	6.92%	42,656	6.42%
Galt	Sacramento	5,065	44.02%	6,118	53.17%	323	2.81%	-1,053	-9.15%	11,506	-1.47%
Isleton	Sacramento	159	49.53%	151	47.04%	11	3.43%	8	2.49%	321	-15.55%
Rancho Cordova	Sacramento	19,022	56.18%	13,927	41.13%	910	2.69%	5,095	15.05%	33,859	-0.62%
Sacramento	Sacramento	168,776	75.11%	50,430	22.44%	5,511	2.45%	118,346	52.66%	224,717	-1.15%
Unincorporated Area	Sacramento	150,449	54.89%	116,452	42.49%	7,172	2.62%	33,997	12.40%	274,073	0.81%
Hollister	San Benito	11,351	67.07%	5,188	30.65%	385	2.27%	6,163	36.42%	16,924	1.15%
San Juan Bautista	San Benito	772	68.32%	329	29.12%	29	2.57%	443	39.20%	1,130	-1.05%
Unincorporated Area	San Benito	5,505	51.13%	5,073	47.12%	189	1.76%	432	4.01%	10,767	4.16%
Adelanto	San Bernardino (Note: 2016's city results in San Bernardino county are missing 34 write in votes done for the candidates on the ballot, as they were put on their own county-wide line item rather than being included in the city results.)	5,873 (Note: Statewide candidate vote percentages and the total vote number differ here because California's Supplement to Statement of Vote does not count write in votes as part of the city totals.)	66.40%	2,752	31.11%	220	2.49%	3,121	35.29%	8,845	-5.61%
Apple Valley	San Bernardino	12,593	36.98%	20,746	60.91%	719	2.11%	-8,153	-23.94%	34,058	5.65%
Barstow	San Bernardino	3,454	48.20%	3,522	49.15%	190	2.65%	-68	-0.95%	7,166	1.61%
Big Bear Lake	San Bernardino	977	38.59%	1,507	59.52%	48	1.90%	-530	-20.93%	2,532	7.80%
Chino	San Bernardino	20,476	54.04%	16,719	44.13%	694	1.83%	3,757	9.92%	37,889	-1.56%
Chino Hills	San Bernardino	20,714	52.41%	18,166	45.96%	645	1.63%	2,548	6.45%	39,525	2.01%
Colton	San Bernardino	11,690	66.80%	5,395	30.83%	414	2.37%	6,295	35.97%	17,499	-8.33%
Fontana	San Bernardino	49,817	65.24%	24,910	32.62%	1,636	2.14%	24,907	32.62%	76,363	-10.13%
Grand Terrace	San Bernardino	3,251	52.15%	2,832	45.43%	151	2.42%	419	6.72%	6,234	4.72%
Hesperia	San Bernardino	15,259	43.20%	19,344	54.77%	717	2.03%	-4,085	-11.57%	35,320	2.26%
Highland	San Bernardino	11,595	54.53%	9,203	43.28%	466	2.19%	2,392	11.25%	21,264	-0.22%
Loma Linda	San Bernardino	5,992	57.33%	4,169	39.89%	291	2.78%	1,823	17.44%	10,452	2.17%
Montclair	San Bernardino	8,721	66.85%	3,973	30.45%	352	2.70%	4,748	36.39%	13,046	-8.39%
Needles	San Bernardino	649	38.06%	1,019	59.77%	37	2.17%	-370	-21.70%	1,705	0.83%
Ontario	San Bernardino	40,000	63.61%	21,528	34.23%	1,357	2.16%	18,472	29.37%	62,885	-5.80%
Rancho Cucamonga	San Bernardino	45,190	51.85%	40,220	46.15%	1,744	2.00%	4,970	5.70%	87,154	1.70%
Redlands	San Bernardino	20,196	54.12%	16,149	43.27%	974	2.61%	4,047	10.84%	37,319	6.04%
Rialto	San Bernardino	24,691	70.17%	9,725	27.64%	771	2.19%	14,966	42.53%	35,187	-9.35%
San Bernardino	San Bernardino	41,463	65.62%	20,142	31.88%	1,582	2.50%	21,321	33.74%	63,187	-4.87%
Twentynine Palms	San Bernardino	2,636	44.71%	2,931	49.71%	329	5.58%	-295	-5.00%	5,896	13.16%
Upland	San Bernardino	21,095	53.95%	17,172	43.92%	833	2.13%	3,923	10.03%	39,100	4.21%
Victorville	San Bernardino	23,699	57.69%	16,375	39.86%	1,009	2.46%	7,324	17.83%	41,083	0.14%
Yucaipa	San Bernardino	9,480	34.80%	17,192	63.11%	570	2.09%	-7,712	-28.31%	27,242	1.96%
Yucca Valley	San Bernardino	3,936	39.31%	5,808	58.00%	269	2.69%	-1,872	-18.70%	10,013	11.32%
Unincorporated Area	San Bernardino	52,412	43.69%	64,758	53.98%	2,797	2.33%	-12,346	-10.29%	119,967	2.94%
Carlsbad	San Diego	41,826	57.76%	29,110	40.20%	1,483	2.05%	12,716	17.56%	72,419	7.11%
Chula Vista	San Diego	81,794	64.61%	42,360	33.46%	2,438	1.93%	39,434	31.15%	126,592	-6.30%
Coronado	San Diego	5,310	52.57%	4,576	45.31%	214	2.12%	734	7.27%	10,100	9.43%
Del Mar	San Diego	1,963	63.51%	1,058	34.23%	70	2.26%	905	29.28%	3,091	-0.18%
El Cajon	San Diego	19,028	46.93%	20,579	50.75%	940	2.32%	-1,551	-3.83%	40,547	-0.27%
Encinitas	San Diego	27,051	66.91%	12,491	30.90%	886	2.19%	14,560	36.01%	40,428	4.65%
Escondido	San Diego	33,730	55.29%	25,739	42.19%	1,538	2.52%	7,991	13.10%	61,007	7.92%
Imperial Beach	San Diego	6,129	57.24%	4,233	39.53%	346	3.23%	1,896	17.71%	10,708	-4.55%
La Mesa	San Diego	20,571	63.36%	11,047	34.03%	849	2.61%	9,524	29.33%	32,467	7.72%
Lemon Grove	San Diego	8,004	64.73%	4,055	32.79%	307	2.48%	3,949	31.93%	12,366	1.82%
National City	San Diego	12,862	66.78%	5,979	31.04%	419	2.18%	6,883	35.74%	19,260	-17.05%
Oceanside	San Diego	49,196	55.87%	36,520	41.47%	2,345	2.66%	12,676	14.39%	88,061	6.10%
Poway	San Diego	14,697	51.01%	13,376	46.43%	737	2.56%	1,321	4.59%	28,810	9.20%
San Diego	San Diego	461,985	68.55%	196,373	29.14%	15,614	2.32%	265,612	39.41%	673,972	1.55%
San Marcos	San Diego	25,088	57.27%	17,703	40.41%	1,019	2.33%	7,385	16.86%	43,810	7.50%
Santee	San Diego	13,836	43.05%	17,494	54.43%	809	2.52%	-3,658	-11.38%	32,139	7.81%
Solana Beach	San Diego	5,705	65.19%	2,846	32.52%	201	2.30%	2,859	32.67%	8,752	7.36%
Vista	San Diego	22,984	57.21%	16,124	40.13%	1,069	2.66%	6,860	17.07%	40,177	6.90%
Unincorporated Area	San Diego	112,891	43.92%	138,431	53.86%	5,694	2.22%	-25,540	-9.94%	257,016	6.24%
San Francisco	San Francisco	378,156	85.27%	56,417	12.72%	8,885	2.00%	321,739	72.55%	443,458	-3.66%
Escalon	San Joaquin	1,261	33.30%	2,453	64.77%	73	1.93%	-1,192	-31.48%	3,787	-3.36%
Lathrop	San Joaquin	6,540	64.50%	3,379	33.33%	220	2.17%	3,161	31.18%	10,139	-5.88%
Lodi	San Joaquin	12,254	43.73%	15,120	53.96%	649	2.32%	-2,866	-10.23%	28,023	3.73%
Manteca	San Joaquin	18,674	52.65%	16,017	45.16%	774	2.18%	2,657	7.49%	35,465	2.38%
Ripon	San Joaquin	2,829	32.34%	5,741	65.63%	177	2.02%	-2,912	-33.29%	8,747	5.84%
Stockton	San Joaquin	67,935	65.91%	32,875	31.90%	2,256	2.19%	35,060	34.02%	103,066	-4.73%
Tracy	San Joaquin	24,035	62.45%	13,617	35.38%	832	2.16%	10,418	27.07%	38,484	0.46%
Unincorporated Area	San Joaquin	27,609	45.46%	31,896	52.52%	1,227	2.02%	-4,287	-7.06%	60,732	0.84%
Arroyo Grande	San Luis Obispo	6,350	54.33%	5,019	42.94%	319	2.73%	1,331	11.39%	11,688	8.40%
Atascadero	San Luis Obispo	8,665	49.38%	8,402	47.88%	482	2.75%	263	1.50%	17,549	5.81%
El Paso de Robles	San Luis Obispo	7,376	47.70%	7,722	49.94%	364	2.35%	-346	-2.24%	15,462	6.79%
Grover Beach	San Luis Obispo	3,716	54.45%	2,944	43.14%	165	2.42%	772	11.31%	6,825	1.20%
Morro Bay	San Luis Obispo	4,603	63.21%	2,523	34.65%	156	2.14%	2,080	28.56%	7,282	7.50%
Pismo Beach	San Luis Obispo	3,084	53.29%	2,587	44.70%	116	2.00%	497	8.59%	5,787	4.06%
San Luis Obispo	San Luis Obispo	20,024	74.85%	5,956	22.26%	773	2.89%	14,068	52.58%	26,753	6.63%
Unincorporated Area	San Luis Obispo	34,492	50.47%	32,283	47.24%	1,560	2.28%	2,209	3.23%	68,335	3.19%
Atherton	San Mateo	3,194	71.81%	1,148	25.81%	106	2.38%	2,046	46.00%	4,448	5.40%
Belmont	San Mateo	11,907	78.80%	2,883	19.08%	321	2.12%	9,024	59.72%	15,111	3.86%
Brisbane	San Mateo	2,113	79.74%	477	18.00%	60	2.26%	1,636	61.74%	2,650	-0.51%
Burlingame	San Mateo	12,952	77.89%	3,382	20.34%	294	1.77%	9,570	57.55%	16,628	1.70%
Colma	San Mateo	517	79.42%	124	19.05%	10	1.54%	393	60.37%	651	-10.55%
Daly City	San Mateo	32,551	77.21%	9,007	21.36%	603	1.43%	23,544	55.84%	42,161	-8.56%
East Palo Alto	San Mateo	7,347	86.63%	962	11.34%	172	2.03%	6,385	75.29%	8,481	-7.55%
Foster City	San Mateo	12,080	76.29%	3,472	21.93%	283	1.79%	8,608	54.36%	15,835	2.84%
Half Moon Bay	San Mateo	5,374	75.83%	1,552	21.90%	161	2.27%	3,822	53.93%	7,087	2.94%
Hillsborough	San Mateo	4,915	68.32%	2,111	29.34%	168	2.34%	2,804	38.98%	7,194	6.66%
Menlo Park	San Mateo	14,813	84.64%	2,347	13.41%	341	1.95%	12,466	71.23%	17,501	1.62%
Millbrae	San Mateo	8,491	70.58%	3,286	27.31%	254	2.11%	5,205	43.26%	12,031	-1.67%
Pacifica	San Mateo	17,888	76.51%	4,995	21.36%	498	2.13%	12,893	55.14%	23,381	-0.34%
Portola Valley	San Mateo	2,603	80.39%	556	17.17%	79	2.44%	2,047	63.22%	3,238	3.93%
Redwood City	San Mateo	31,163	80.50%	6,742	17.42%	808	2.09%	24,421	63.08%	38,713	3.21%
San Bruno	San Mateo	15,863	74.60%	5,009	23.56%	393	1.85%	10,854	51.04%	21,265	-2.06%
San Carlos	San Mateo	15,003	79.64%	3,475	18.45%	361	1.92%	11,528	61.19%	18,839	4.34%
San Mateo	San Mateo	39,433	77.95%	10,212	20.19%	941	1.86%	29,221	57.76%	50,586	0.55%
South San Francisco	San Mateo	23,586	77.06%	6,552	21.41%	471	1.54%	17,034	55.65%	30,609	-4.82%
Woodside	San Mateo	2,705	73.01%	914	24.67%	86	2.32%	1,791	48.34%	3,705	4.72%
Unincorporated Area	San Mateo	26,998	79.27%	6,378	18.73%	681	2.00%	20,620	60.55%	34,057	2.38%
Buellton	Santa Barbara	1,657	55.21%	1,266	42.19%	78	2.60%	391	13.03%	3,001	11.30%
Carpinteria	Santa Barbara	5,054	72.13%	1,810	25.83%	143	2.04%	3,244	46.30%	7,007	4.51%
Goleta	Santa Barbara	12,696	72.04%	4,492	25.49%	435	2.47%	8,204	46.55%	17,623	6.25%
Guadalupe	Santa Barbara	1,521	67.66%	680	30.25%	47	2.09%	841	37.41%	2,248	-13.99%
Lompoc	Santa Barbara	8,561	56.40%	6,198	40.83%	421	2.77%	2,363	15.57%	15,180	4.62%
Santa Barbara	Santa Barbara	38,573	79.29%	9,126	18.76%	949	1.95%	29,447	60.53%	48,648	4.62%
Santa Maria	Santa Barbara	16,972	57.10%	12,091	40.68%	661	2.22%	4,881	16.42%	29,724	-0.77%
Solvang	Santa Barbara	1,921	53.29%	1,600	44.38%	84	2.33%	321	8.90%	3,605	10.11%
Unincorporated Area	Santa Barbara	43,008	58.71%	28,473	38.87%	1,771	2.42%	14,535	19.84%	73,252	1.17%
Campbell	Santa Clara (Note: 2016's city results in Santa Clara county are missing 1,639 write in votes done for the candidates on the ballot, as they were put on their own county-wide line item rather than being included in the city results.)	16,403	73.65%	5,322	23.90%	547	2.46%	11,081	49.75%	22,272	1.41%
Cupertino	Santa Clara	21,509	75.01%	6,567	22.90%	598	2.09%	14,942	52.11%	28,674	-2.42%
Gilroy	Santa Clara	17,033	67.63%	7,600	30.18%	551	2.19%	9,433	37.46%	25,184	0.39%
Los Altos	Santa Clara	15,705	79.76%	3,594	18.25%	391	1.99%	12,111	61.51%	19,690	5.21%
Los Altos Hills	Santa Clara	4,245	73.28%	1,399	24.15%	149	2.57%	2,846	49.13%	5,793	4.91%
Los Gatos	Santa Clara	14,317	72.06%	5,085	25.59%	466	2.35%	9,232	46.47%	19,868	2.36%
Milpitas	Santa Clara	20,569	67.94%	9,220	30.46%	485	1.60%	11,349	37.49%	30,274	-14.68%
Monte Sereno	Santa Clara	1,653	67.44%	754	30.76%	44	1.80%	899	36.68%	2,451	-0.06%
Morgan Hill	Santa Clara	15,552	64.43%	7,957	32.97%	628	2.60%	7,595	31.47%	24,137	3.52%
Mountain View	Santa Clara	28,839	82.51%	5,337	15.27%	777	2.22%	23,502	67.24%	34,953	0.14%
Palo Alto	Santa Clara	31,604	83.99%	5,270	14.01%	754	2.00%	26,334	69.99%	37,628	-0.28%
San Jose	Santa Clara	307,687	71.11%	116,193	26.85%	8,791	2.03%	191,494	44.26%	432,671	-9.05%
Santa Clara	Santa Clara	36,197	74.42%	11,458	23.56%	981	2.02%	24,739	50.87%	48,636	-1.91%
Saratoga	Santa Clara	14,396	72.01%	5,174	25.88%	423	2.12%	9,222	46.13%	19,993	3.15%
Sunnyvale	Santa Clara	45,041	76.69%	12,295	20.93%	1,399	2.38%	32,746	55.75%	58,735	-0.97%
Unincorporated Area	Santa Clara	27,217	68.79%	11,387	28.78%	959	2.42%	15,830	40.01%	39,563	-0.50%
Capitola	Santa Cruz	4,881	77.34%	1,268	20.09%	162	2.57%	3,613	57.25%	6,311	2.33%
Santa Cruz	Santa Cruz	28,315	86.41%	3,584	10.94%	870	2.65%	24,731	75.47%	32,769	2.85%
Scotts Valley	Santa Cruz	5,430	70.96%	2,029	26.52%	193	2.52%	3,401	44.45%	7,652	7.80%
Watsonville	Santa Cruz	13,272	81.02%	2,828	17.26%	281	1.72%	10,444	63.76%	16,381	-4.08%
Unincorporated Area	Santa Cruz	62,348	76.33%	17,228	21.09%	2,107	2.58%	45,120	55.24%	81,683	4.71%
Anderson	Shasta	1,403	30.49%	3,085	67.04%	114	2.48%	-1,682	-36.55%	4,602	2.09%
Redding	Shasta	16,621	35.80%	28,631	61.66%	1,180	2.54%	-12,010	-25.87%	46,432	5.66%
Shasta Lake	Shasta	1,627	33.59%	3,103	64.07%	113	2.33%	-1,476	-30.48%	4,843	4.18%
Unincorporated Area	Shasta	10,349	27.95%	25,970	70.15%	704	1.90%	-15,621	-42.19%	37,023	2.09%
Loyalton	Sierra	124	32.46%	250	65.45%	8	2.09%	-126	-32.98%	382	-5.12%
Unincorporated Area	Sierra	606	39.15%	892	57.62%	50	3.23%	-286	-18.48%	1,548	5.58%
Dorris	Siskiyou	89	32.01%	186	66.91%	3	1.08%	-97	-34.89%	278	-0.14%
Dunsmuir	Siskiyou	512	59.81%	314	36.68%	30	3.50%	198	23.13%	856	10.67%
Etna	Siskiyou	121	33.06%	236	64.48%	9	2.46%	-115	-31.42%	366	-2.08%
Fort Jones	Siskiyou	124	34.35%	221	61.22%	16	4.43%	-97	-26.87%	361	4.67%
Montague	Siskiyou	170	25.88%	469	71.39%	18	2.74%	-299	-45.51%	657	1.31%
Mt. Shasta	Siskiyou	1,246	61.90%	711	35.32%	56	2.78%	535	26.58%	2,013	2.87%
Tulelake	Siskiyou	70	38.04%	109	59.24%	5	2.72%	-39	-21.20%	184	17.18%
Weed	Siskiyou	490	49.30%	468	47.08%	36	3.62%	22	2.21%	994	-0.56%
Yreka	Siskiyou	1,327	37.04%	2,153	60.09%	103	2.87%	-826	-23.05%	3,583	4.89%
Unincorporated Area	Siskiyou	5,444	38.45%	8,423	59.50%	290	2.05%	-2,979	-21.04%	14,157	4.22%
Benicia	Solano	12,001	69.03%	4,968	28.57%	417	2.40%	7,033	40.45%	17,386	2.02%
Dixon	Solano	4,608	50.86%	4,197	46.32%	255	2.81%	411	4.54%	9,060	-0.78%
Fairfield	Solano	32,990	66.30%	15,548	31.25%	1,218	2.45%	17,442	35.06%	49,756	0.93%
Rio Vista	Solano	3,617	57.43%	2,586	41.06%	95	1.51%	1,031	16.37%	6,298	5.66%
Suisun City	Solano	8,814	69.79%	3,480	27.55%	336	2.66%	5,334	42.23%	12,630	1.16%
Vacaville	Solano	24,243	51.56%	21,549	45.83%	1,231	2.62%	2,694	5.73%	47,023	0.29%
Vallejo	Solano	40,819	76.56%	11,419	21.42%	1,077	2.02%	29,400	55.14%	53,315	-3.06%
Unincorporated Area	Solano	4,547	43.88%	5,559	53.64%	257	2.48%	-1,012	-9.77%	10,363	-1.69%
Cloverdale	Sonoma	3,199	68.33%	1,372	29.30%	111	2.37%	1,827	39.02%	4,682	4.53%
Cotati	Sonoma	3,242	74.79%	977	22.54%	116	2.68%	2,265	52.25%	4,335	6.49%
Healdsburg	Sonoma	5,262	76.91%	1,420	20.75%	160	2.34%	3,842	56.15%	6,842	2.64%
Petaluma	Sonoma	26,905	75.51%	7,889	22.14%	836	2.35%	19,016	53.37%	35,630	2.55%
Rohnert Park	Sonoma	15,617	70.87%	5,813	26.38%	605	2.75%	9,804	44.49%	22,035	3.05%
Santa Rosa	Sonoma	66,918	76.05%	18,853	21.43%	2,218	2.52%	48,065	54.63%	87,989	4.47%
Sebastopol	Sonoma	4,445	86.21%	588	11.40%	123	2.39%	3,857	74.81%	5,156	4.18%
Sonoma	Sonoma	5,432	77.38%	1,451	20.67%	137	1.95%	3,981	56.71%	7,020	5.64%
Windsor	Sonoma	10,187	68.27%	4,365	29.25%	369	2.47%	5,822	39.02%	14,921	2.80%
Unincorporated Area	Sonoma	58,731	73.74%	19,097	23.98%	1,814	2.28%	39,634	49.77%	79,642	3.98%
Ceres	Stanislaus	9,608	58.95%	6,327	38.82%	364	2.23%	3,281	20.13%	16,299	-4.33%
Hughson	Stanislaus	1,257	37.28%	2,052	60.85%	63	1.87%	-795	-23.58%	3,372	-1.13%
Modesto	Stanislaus	46,065	52.81%	39,039	44.76%	2,119	2.43%	7,026	8.06%	87,223	0.49%
Newman	Stanislaus	2,243	56.15%	1,669	41.78%	83	2.08%	574	14.37%	3,995	-1.45%
Oakdale	Stanislaus	3,807	34.90%	6,865	62.94%	236	2.16%	-3,058	-28.03%	10,908	-3.71%
Patterson	Stanislaus	5,300	64.91%	2,669	32.69%	196	2.40%	2,631	32.22%	8,165	-3.27%
Riverbank	Stanislaus	5,004	51.28%	4,518	46.30%	237	2.43%	486	4.98%	9,759	-0.48%
Turlock	Stanislaus	14,314	47.09%	15,409	50.69%	677	2.23%	-1,095	-3.60%	30,400	-2.95%
Waterford	Stanislaus	1,237	37.98%	1,947	59.78%	73	2.24%	-710	-21.80%	3,257	0.13%
Unincorporated Area	Stanislaus	17,006	40.98%	23,650	56.99%	842	2.03%	-6,644	-16.01%	41,498	-0.96%
Live Oak	Sutter	1,683	51.26%	1,527	46.51%	73	2.22%	156	4.75%	3,283	-7.37%
Yuba City	Sutter	12,844	44.54%	15,378	53.33%	614	2.13%	-2,534	-8.79%	28,836	-1.49%
Unincorporated Area	Sutter	2,840	26.99%	7,470	71.00%	211	2.01%	-4,630	-44.01%	10,521	-1.63%
Corning	Tehama	917	40.59%	1,282	56.75%	60	2.66%	-365	-16.16%	2,259	-1.44%
Red Bluff	Tehama	2,051	36.96%	3,325	59.92%	173	3.12%	-1,274	-22.96%	5,549	1.54%
Tehama	Tehama	83	37.73%	130	59.09%	7	3.18%	-47	-21.36%	220	4.50%
Unincorporated Area	Tehama	5,860	28.32%	14,404	69.61%	429	2.07%	-8,544	-41.29%	20,693	1.02%
Unincorporated Area	Trinity	2,851	45.56%	3,188	50.94%	219	3.50%	-337	-5.39%	6,258	5.31%
Dinuba	Tulare	3,509	59.01%	2,305	38.77%	132	2.22%	1,204	20.25%	5,946	-5.67%
Exeter	Tulare	1,373	34.01%	2,592	64.21%	72	1.78%	-1,219	-30.20%	4,037	1.26%
Farmersville	Tulare	1,440	62.91%	782	34.16%	67	2.93%	658	28.75%	2,289	-8.87%
Lindsay	Tulare	1,666	65.59%	819	32.24%	55	2.17%	847	33.35%	2,540	-12.42%
Porterville	Tulare	8,104	48.69%	8,159	49.02%	382	2.29%	-55	-0.33%	16,645	-1.92%
Tulare	Tulare	9,333	43.52%	11,660	54.37%	454	2.12%	-2,327	-10.85%	21,447	0.22%
Visalia	Tulare	24,226	43.86%	29,722	53.81%	1,285	2.33%	-5,496	-9.95%	55,233	5.17%
Woodlake	Tulare	1,165	67.03%	537	30.90%	36	2.07%	628	36.13%	1,738	-8.01%
Unincorporated Area	Tulare	15,289	41.37%	21,003	56.83%	665	1.80%	-5,714	-15.46%	36,957	1.36%
Sonora	Tuolumne	1,258	50.18%	1,156	46.11%	93	3.71%	102	4.07%	2,507	8.60%
Unincorporated Area	Tuolumne	10,720	38.43%	16,533	59.27%	641	2.30%	-5,813	-20.84%	27,894	1.81%
Camarillo	Ventura	22,269	53.81%	18,214	44.01%	900	2.17%	4,055	9.80%	41,383	5.35%
Fillmore	Ventura	4,013	62.63%	2,264	35.34%	130	2.03%	1,749	27.30%	6,407	-1.45%
Moorpark	Ventura	11,364	55.75%	8,613	42.26%	406	1.99%	2,751	13.50%	20,383	5.28%
Ojai	Ventura	3,392	70.93%	1,288	26.93%	102	2.13%	2,104	44.00%	4,782	5.84%
Oxnard	Ventura	50,253	71.85%	18,214	26.04%	1,478	2.11%	32,039	45.81%	69,945	-4.20%
Port Hueneme	Ventura	5,695	65.95%	2,715	31.44%	225	2.61%	2,980	34.51%	8,635	-0.64%
San Buenaventura	Ventura	38,953	63.27%	21,107	34.29%	1,502	2.44%	17,846	28.99%	61,562	5.29%
Santa Paula	Ventura	7,494	67.71%	3,382	30.56%	191	1.73%	4,112	37.16%	11,067	-3.13%
Simi Valley	Ventura	35,225	49.35%	34,590	48.46%	1,562	2.19%	635	0.89%	71,377	5.00%
Thousand Oaks	Ventura	43,330	56.78%	31,455	41.22%	1,523	2.00%	11,875	15.56%	76,308	5.82%
Unincorporated Area	Ventura	29,400	57.82%	20,365	40.05%	1,084	2.13%	9,035	17.77%	50,849	5.13%
Davis	Yolo	28,842	85.13%	4,223	12.47%	813	2.40%	24,619	72.67%	33,878	2.73%
West Sacramento	Yolo	14,616	62.89%	8,081	34.77%	542	2.33%	6,535	28.12%	23,239	-1.16%
Winters	Yolo	1,999	59.05%	1,289	38.08%	97	2.87%	710	20.97%	3,385	-1.99%
Woodland	Yolo	16,623	62.40%	9,339	35.06%	677	2.54%	7,284	27.34%	26,639	2.62%
Unincorporated Area	Yolo	5,518	54.51%	4,360	43.07%	245	2.42%	1,158	11.44%	10,123	-3.90%
Marysville	Yuba	1,776	39.93%	2,531	56.90%	141	3.17%	-755	-16.97%	4,448	0.77%
Wheatland	Yuba	490	29.99%	1,090	66.71%	54	3.30%	-600	-36.72%	1,634	-1.20%
Unincorporated Area	Yuba	8,964	37.81%	14,055	59.29%	686	2.89%	-5,091	-21.48%	23,705	1.75%
Totals		11,110,640	63.50%	6,006,518	34.33%	378,733	2.16%	5,104,122	29.17%	17,495,891	-1.20%

==== Cities and unincorporated areas that flipped from Republican to Democratic ====
- Atascadero (San Luis Obispo)
- Banning (Riverside)
- Bradbury (Los Angeles)
- Brea (Orange)
- Coronado (San Diego)
- Crescent City (Del Norte)
- Hemet (Riverside)
- La Quinta (Riverside)
- La Verne (Los Angeles)
- Laguna Hills (Orange)
- Laguna Niguel (Orange)
- Lake Elsinore (Riverside)
- Lake Forest (Orange)
- Mission Viejo (Orange)
- Palm Desert (Riverside)
- Placerville (El Dorado)
- Poway (San Diego)
- Simi Valley (Ventura)
- Solvang (Santa Barbara)
- Sonora (Tuolumne)
- Unincorporated area of Mono
- Unincorporated area of Nevada
- Unincorporated area of San Benito

==== Cities and unincorporated areas that flipped from Democratic to Republican ====
- Fountain Valley (Orange)
- Industry (Los Angeles)
- Porterville (Tulare)
- Westminster (Orange)

== Analysis ==
Joe Biden won California by a landslide margin of 29.2%. Despite Biden's overall victory closely mirroring Clinton's, under a point behind her margin, there were large swings underneath the statewide margins. Biden lost ground in large diverse counties while improving in mostly whiter and more suburban counties. While Trump yet again lost Los Angeles County by a landslide and yet again received less than 30% of the vote in the county, he improved his standing in Los Angeles County, thanks to growth in mainly Latino neighborhoods in the Gateway Cities and the San Fernando Valley, alongside improvements in mainly Asian communities in the San Gabriel Valley. Trump also managed to gain in white neighborhoods as well, with visible gains made in Beverly Hills and other Westside communities, mainly because of the region's high Jewish population, Burbank and Glendale in the eastern San Fernando Valley, and the Valley's southern wealthy neighborhoods such as Encino and Tarzana. California is also one of the seven states (along with Illinois, Arkansas, Nevada, Utah, Florida, and Hawaii) as well as the District of Columbia in which Trump's margin increased from 2016.

While Biden won Santa Clara County by a landslide margin of 47.4%, his margins shrank below that of Hillary Clinton's 2016 margin, 52.1%, in the county. His margins slightly shrank in the more suburban communities of Santa Clara and Sunnyvale, even improving in very wealthy cities like Los Altos Hills and Saratoga, but his margins fell in the heavily Asian parts of San Jose, and Milpitas, which Biden won by a landslide, as Trump's comparison of Biden's proposed policies to socialism and communism drove Vietnamese American voters towards him. The issue over China in the South China Sea helped swing Vietnamese Americans, as well as Filipino American voters to the Republican Party. Nonetheless, Trump still received a small 25% of the vote in Santa Clara County, underperforming President Bush in 2004, John McCain in 2008 and Mitt Romney in 2012. Trump also gained in Alameda and San Francisco County, but his improvements were smaller than Santa Clara County and Los Angeles County. Meanwhile, Biden gained in the more white and suburban San Diego County and Riverside County. In the former, Biden's improvements in wealthy suburban areas, like Carlsbad and Encinitas, alongside gains in more working-class Escondido and Oceanside, helped overcome Trump's growth in the more Hispanic neighborhoods in southern San Diego County. In Riverside County, Trump lost ground in whiter more Republican territory in the southern part of the county like Menifee and Temecula, and in very liberal communities like Palm Springs in the Coachella Valley, which overcame Biden's decline in Hispanic communities towards the county's northwest, including Moreno Valley and Perris. Trump also gained grounds in certain areas like West Covina and Carson.

Outside the large population centers and the Inland Empire, both parties largely ran in line with their 2016 performances. In the Central Valley, Biden's margin was roughly unchanged, though he lost some support in the northern counties like Merced and Stanislaus while gaining in the more Republican southern counties around Kern (Bakersfield). Biden improved by a point in Sacramento County but saw visible growth in suburban Placer County. However, Trump overwhelmingly outperformed his 2016 performance in rural and heavily Hispanic Imperial County, gaining 17 points. Biden's margin was higher than John Kerry's or Al Gore's in Imperial County, but underperformed Barack Obama and Hillary Clinton.

=== Edison exit polls ===
2020 presidential election in California by demographic subgroup (Edison exit polling)
Demographic subgroup	Biden	Trump	% of total vote
Total vote	63.48	29.32	100
Ideology
Liberals	90	9	29
Moderates	70	28	41
Conservatives	28	70	30
Party
Democrats	97	2	50
Republicans	10	89	30
Independents	57	35	20
Gender
Men	63	34	47
Women	63	35	53
Race/ethnicity
White	51	47	49
Black	82	15	9
Latino	75	23	31
Asian	76	22	6
Other	59	35	5
Age
18–24 years old	73	27	9
25–29 years old	78	21	5
30–39 years old	63	32	20
40–49 years old	58	41	17
50–64 years old	62	36	31
65 and older	61	37	19
Sexual orientation
LGBT	–	–	7
Not LGBT	62	37	93
Education
High school or less	54	45	14
Some college education	59	37	26
Associate degree	63	36	16
Bachelor's degree	65	34	29
Postgraduate degree	74	24	15
Income
Under $50,000	61	37	36
$50,000–$99,999	61	37	36
Over $100,000	65	34	29
Issue regarded as most important
Racial inequality	93	6	18
Coronavirus	90	9	23
Economy	27	72	21
Crime and safety	–	–	17
Health care	–	–	17
Region
Coastal	65	34	10
Inland	52	45	30
Bay Area	75	23	18
Los Angeles County	71	27	24
Southern coast	58	39	18
Area type
Urban	68	30	43
Suburban	60	37	52
Rural	–	–	5
Family's financial situation today
Better than four years ago	43	55	37
Worse than four years ago	80	14	25
About the same	67	31	38

== See also ==
- United States presidential elections in California
- 2020 California elections
- 2020 United States presidential election
- 2020 Democratic Party presidential primaries
- 2020 Republican Party presidential primaries
- 2020 Libertarian Party presidential primaries
- 2020 Green Party presidential primaries
- 2020 United States elections
