= 2018 California's 39th congressional district election =

- November 6, 2018

California's 39th congressional district
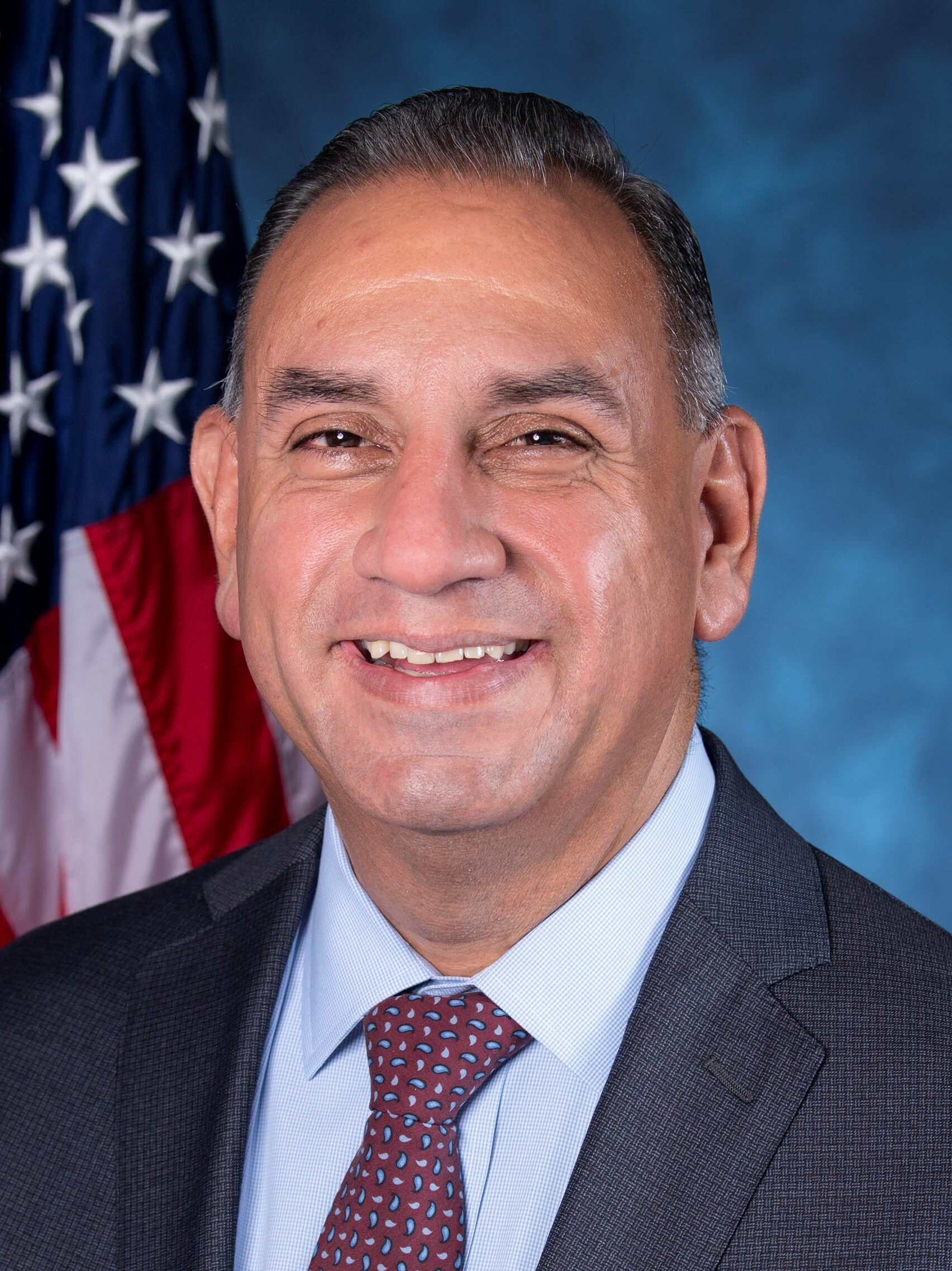

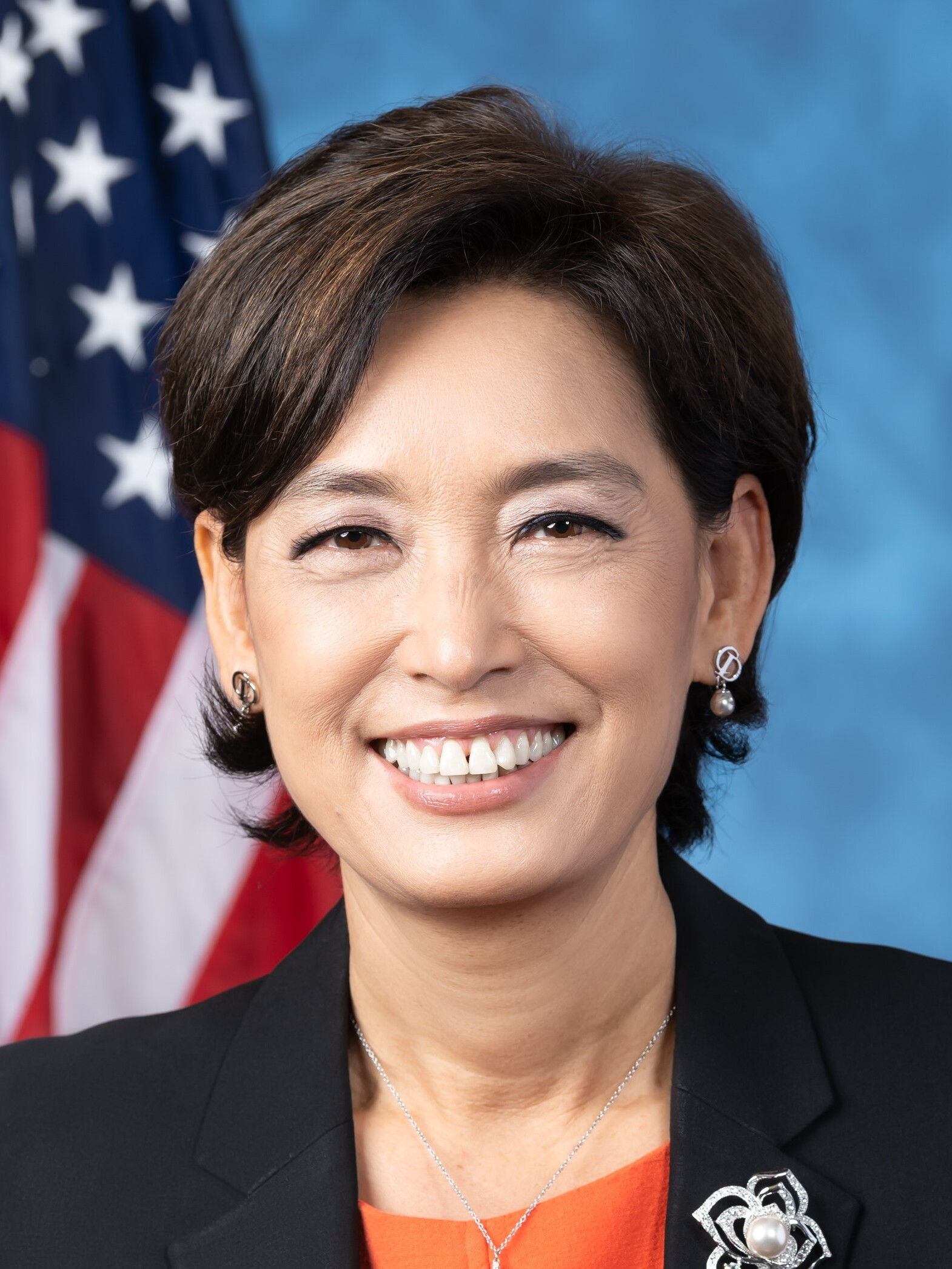
Candidate	Gil Cisneros	Young Kim
Party	Democratic	Republican
Popular vote	126,002	118,391
Percentage	51.6%	48.4%
- County results Cisneros: 50–60% Kim: 50–60%
U.S. Representative before election
Ed Royce
Republican
Elected U.S. Representative
Gil Cisneros
Democratic

The 2018 California's 39th congressional district election was held on Tuesday, November 6, 2018, with a primary election being held on June 5, 2018. Incumbent Republican Representative Ed Royce retired instead of running for a 14th term.

This election was one of 53 House elections that were held in California and 435 held nationwide, but it was called "the weirdest race in the country" due to an over-abundance of Democratic candidates potentially spoiling the ability for any Democrats to place first or second in the primary. Under election rules, the top two vote-getters in the jungle primary advanced to the November general election, regardless of party affiliation.

The primary election was held on June 5, 2018. Republican Assemblywoman Young Kim and Democrat Gil Cisneros came in first and second place respectively, assuaging fears that two candidates from the same party would advance.

The general election was held on November 6. On November 17, AP News projected that Cisneros had won the election.

== Background ==
The 39th district straddles the Los Angeles–Orange–San Bernardino tri-county border and includes Chino Hills, Diamond Bar, and Fullerton.

In January 2018, Republican Ed Royce, who had represented the 39th district since 2013 and previously represented the 40th district from 2003 to 2013 and the 39th district from 1993 to 2003, announced his plans not to run for reelection. During his tenure in Congress, Royce was chairman of the United States House Committee on Foreign Affairs. According to Rep. Steve Stivers, Republicans needed to win in suburban districts like Orange County's to hold their majority.

After Royce's retirement, the district was considered a prime opportunity for a Democratic pickup, citing dissatisfaction with the Trump administration and the strength of Hillary Clinton's 8 percent lead in the district's vote in the 2016 United States presidential election. The proportion of voters in the district who were registered Republican dropped from 40 to 35 percent since 2012, but Republicans believed that their turnout would be significantly larger than Democrats'. Moreover, as of January 2018, there were still more voters in the district registered as Republicans than as Democrats (128,375 to 123,849).

Democrats hoped to have a demographic advantage in this district, since it was less than 30 percent white. However, several commentators (including Cook) speculated that an Asian American nominee would have an edge in this district, regardless of party, as Democrat Jay Chen did against Royce in the 2012 district election. In 2018, the district was conservative and upper-middle class with only 35 percent of the population identifying as Hispanic and the majority identifying as white or Asian. Specifically, Asians made up around 32 percent of the district.

Royce's retirement led the Cook Political Report to move CA-39 from lean Republican to lean Democratic. The New York Times rated this district a tossup.

== Primary election ==
The primary election in 2018 had a large number of Democrats and Republicans. As the election drew near, Democratic organizations like the Democratic Congressional Campaign Committee (DCCC) became concerned that the flood of Democratic candidates might split the vote, causing two Republicans to win the nomination. In June, the race was reported to be the most expensive race in California, drawing $10 million in spending. A majority of the spending was attributed to Democratic frontrunners Gil Cisneros and Andy Thorburn, who were able to personally fund their own respective campaigns, and ran increasingly negative ads targeting one another. On June 5, Republican Young Kim and Democrat Gil Cisneros finished in first and second place, advancing to the general election.

=== Candidates ===
The district had 17 candidates heading into the June 5 primary — six Democrats, seven Republicans, two American Independents and two no party preference candidates.

A poll from Fight Back California PAC found that when presented with a list of the three Republicans and four Democrats with some name recognition, Republican Young Kim led the pack with 21 percent of the vote, followed by Republican Bob Huff (19 percent), Democrat Gil Cisneros (16 percent), and Democrat Andy Thorburn (16 percent).

During the primary, initially seven Democratic candidates split the vote in the district, all but blocking the party from making an endorsement there; the district was one of three (the other two being the 48th and 49th) that Democrats were concerned they could lose in the primary due to vote-splitting. The party held a pre-endorsement conference in January and urged some candidates to withdraw.

Although the Democratic Congressional Campaign Committee backed Gil Cisneros, including by adding him to its "Red to Blue" program, which offered designated candidates financial and organizational support, it did not officially endorse him. Tran was endorsed by Emily's List and by the Feminist Majority Foundation. The California and Orange County Democratic parties did not endorse anyone. Thorburn was endorsed by the California Nurses Association.

Scientist Phil Janowicz dropped out of the race to avoid splitting the Democratic vote. Potential candidate Jay Chen also opted not to run, saying, "The greatest contribution I can make right now is to help consolidate the field, by stepping away from it." The DCCC praised his move. Chen's dropping out was cited as an example of how self-funding millionaires drove less wealthy Democrats out of California primaries, as Cisneros obtained his wealth from winning a Mega Millions lottery jackpot.

Republicans were less eager than Democrats to thin the herd of candidates, which was why the Young Guns program included both Kim and Nelson on its list.

==== Republican ====
Republican candidates campaigned chiefly on increased border security and an end to California sanctuary state law.

===== Bob Huff =====
Bob Huff is a former state senator who represented California's 29th State Senate district.

Bob Huff (R)

Organizations

- San Diego Asian Americans for Equality
- Silicon Valley Chinese Association

===== Young Kim =====
Young Kim is a former assemblywoman who represented California's 65th State Assembly district. She emigrated from South Korea in 1975, graduated from University of Southern California in 1981, worked in a bank and then as a controller of a ladieswear manufacturing firm. She served in Royce's congressional office for 21 years as community liaison and director of Asian affairs, and received Royce's endorsement.

Kim said she wants to create jobs and keep taxes low. She said she wanted to increase border security and ensure those brought to the U.S. "as children without legal documentation are treated fairly and with compassion."

Young Kim (R)

Federal-level officials

- Rosario Marin, former U.S. treasurer

U.S. representatives

- Ed Royce (R-CA-39)
- Mimi Walters (R-CA-45)

State assembly members

- Jordan Cunningham, assemblyman
- James Gallagher, assemblyman
- David Hadley, former assemblyman
- Tom Lackey, assemblyman
- Bob Pacheco, former assemblyman
- Jim Patterson, assemblyman
- Jim Silva, former assemblyman/supervisor

Local-level officials

- Michael Antonovich, LA County supervisor (ret.)
- Don Bankhead, former mayor, City of Fullerton
- Christine Barnes, former mayor, City of La Palma
- Bruce Barrows, former mayor, City of Cerritos
- Stacy Berry, councilwoman, City of Cypress
- Patrick Brenden, councilman, City of Huntington Beach
- Tara Campbell, councilwoman, City of Yorba Linda
- Joe Carcchio, councilman, City of Huntington Beach
- Carol Chen, former mayor, City of Cerritos
- Cynthia Coad, former supervisor, OC Board of Supervisors
- Laurie Davies, councilwoman, City of Laguna Niguel
- Diane Dixon, councilwoman, City of Newport Beach
- Jim Edwards, councilman, City of Cerritos
- Al Ethans, councilman, City of Stanton
- Diana C. Fascenelli, councilwoman, City of Villa Park
- Michael Gates, city attorney, City of Huntington Beach
- Gerard Goedhart, councilman, City of La Palma
- James Gomez, councilman, City of La Habra
- Dean Grose, councilman, City of Los Alamitos
- Charlene Hatakeyama, former mayor, City of La Palma
- Kimberly Ho, councilwoman, City of Westminster
- Cecilia Hupp, mayor, City of Brea
- Sandra Hutchens, OC sheriff
- Dick Jones, former mayor, City of Fullerton
- Tim Keenan, City of Cypress
- Peter Kim, councilman, City of La Palma
- Stephanie Klopfenstein, councilwoman, City of Garden Grove
- Tony Lam, former councilman, City of Westminster
- Patsy Marshall, former mayor, City of Buena Park
- Pat McKinley, former police chief and councilman, City of Fullerton
- Steve Nagel, mayor pro tem, City of Fountain Valley
- Dr. Prakash Narain, former mayor, City of Cypress
- Mark Perumean, president of the board of directors, La Habra Heights County Water District
- Chris Phan, former councilman, City of Garden Grove
- Robbie Pitts, councilman, City of Villa Park
- Mike Posey, mayor, City of Huntington Beach
- Tony Rackauckas, DA, Orange County DA
- Rigoberto Ramirez, councilman, City of Stanton
- Greg Raths, mayor pro tem, City of Mission Viejo
- George Ray, councilman, City of Cerritos
- Ed Royce Sr., former mayor, City of Stanton
- Paul Ruiz, clerk of the board, Brea Unified School District
- Rhonda Shader, councilwoman, City of Placentia
- David Shawver, mayor, City of Stanton
- Marty Simonoff, councilman, City of Brea
- Michelle Steel, supervisor, OC Board of Supervisors
- Michele Steggell, councilwoman, City of La Palma
- Virginia Vaughn, mayor, City of Buena Park
- Michael Vo, City of Fountain Valley
- Mark Waldman, former mayor, City of La Palma

Educators

- Baltes, trustee, La Habra City School District
- Jack Bedell, trustee president, OC Board of Education
- Ryan Bent, trustee, North OC Community College District
- Dr. Joseph Chang, board trustee, Hacienda LA Puente USD
- Alexandria Coronado, former trustee, Anaheim Board of Edu
- Norman Hsu, retired board member, Hacienda La Puente USD
- Dr. Chae-Jin Lee, Claremont McKenna College
- Janny Meyer, Fullerton School District
- James Na, clerk of the board, Chino Valley Unified School District
- Hilda Sugarman, Fullerton School District
- Soo Yoo, president of the board, ABC USD

Individuals

- Josie Anderson, retired social services manager, City of La Habra
- John and Terri Briscoe, former president, CRA (ID only)
- One Chu, RH Parents and Education Foundation
- Jim Horn, retired diplomat, author, activist
- John Hsu, STC Leadership Academy, Rowland Heights
- Charles Kim, former vice chair, CA Acupuncture Board
- John Jungmin Kim, former chairman, CA Acupuncture Board
- Michael Kim, former planning commissioner, City of Brea
- Ed Laird, LCOC member
- Nancy Lee, president, BKSCA
- Elvira Moreno, president, Rep Club North Orange County
- Michael Schroeder, former California Republican Party chairman
- Michael Zhang, Esq., Law Offices of Michael Zhang, Chinese community TV personality and leader

Organizations

- National Association of Women Business Owners
- Republican Party of Orange County

===== Phil Liberatore =====
Phil Liberatore is a certified public accountant, founder of IRS Problem Solvers, and author of God, Money and You.

===== Shawn Nelson =====
Shawn Nelson was a former Orange County supervisor at the time of the election; he was subsequently a top official in the Orange County District Attorney's office.

Shawn Nelson (R)

U.S. representatives

- Dana Rohrabacher (R-CA-48)

State senators

- John Moorlach (R-37)

State assembly members

- Phillip Chen (R-55)

Local-level officials

- Kathryn Barger, Los Angeles County supervisor
- Andrew Do, Orange County supervisor
- Curt Hagman, San Bernardino County supervisor

Individuals

- Robert O'Neill, Navy SEAL combat veteran

Organizations

- Lincoln Club of Orange County

Newspapers

- Orange County Register

==== Democratic ====
Democratic candidates advocated for tax reform to end tax cuts for the wealthy. and supported universal health care. The candidates supported banning assault weapons and implementing universal background checks on gun purchases. Democratic candidate Andy Thorburn sent out mailers accusing candidate Gil Cisneros of investing millions of dollars in gun industry stock.

===== Andy Thorburn =====
Andy Thorburn is a former teacher and union activist who made his wealth in the insurance business. He was CEO of Foothill Ranch-based Global Benefits Group from 2005 to 2015, and remains its largest stockholder. Thorburn supported a Medicare for all healthcare system.

Andy Thorburn (D)

State senators

- Marty Block, former state senator

State assembly members

- Reggie Jones-Sawyer (D-59)

Local-level officials

- Gina Clayton-Tarvin, Ocean View School District board member
- Rick Tuttle, former Los Angeles city controller

Individuals

- Abel Valenzuela, director of UCLA's Institute for Research on Labor and Employment

Organizations

- Communications Workers of America Local 9510
- International Union of Painters and Allied Trades
- Machinists Conference of California
- National Nurses United
- Our Revolution
- United Steelworkers

===== Gil Cisneros =====
Gil Cisneros is a Navy veteran and former shipping and distribution manager at Frito-Lay who won a lottery jackpot of $266 million with his wife in 2010. Cisneros raised the issue of homelessness among veterans, vowing to fight any attempts to defund or weaken HUD-VASH.

Gil Cisneros (D)

Federal-level officials

- Arne Duncan, former secretary of education

U.S. representatives

- Pete Aguilar (D-CA-31)
- Nanette Barragán (D-CA-44)
- Salud Carbajal (D-CA-24)
- Judy Chu (D-CA-27)
- Lou Correa (D-CA-46)
- Grace Napolitano (D-CA-32)
- Lucille Roybal-Allard (D-CA-40)
- Raul Ruiz (D-CA-36)
- Linda Sánchez (D-CA-38)
- Loretta Sanchez, former congresswoman
- Norma Torres (D-CA-35)

State assembly members

- Chris Holden (D-41)
- Sharon Quirk-Silva (D-65)
- Blanca Rubio (D-48)

Local-level officials

- Manuel Baca, Mt. San Antonio College trustee
- Michael Blazey, La Habra mayor pro tempore
- Zeke Hernandez, Rancho Community College District trustee
- Jesus Silva, Fullerton city councilman
- Jeanette Vazquez, Fullerton Elementary School District board member

Individuals

- Dolores Huerta, labor organizer
- Eva Longoria, actress
- George Lopez, comedian

Organizations

- BOLD PAC
- Democratic Congressional Campaign Committee
- End Citizens United
- GIFFORDS
- League of Conservation Voters
- Serve America PAC
- Service Employees International Union California
- Sierra Club
- United Steelworkers
- Vote Vets

===== Sam Jammal =====
Sam Jammal is a former Obama administration official.

Sam Jammal (D)

Federal-level officials

- Cecilia Muñoz, former director of the Obama White House Domestic Policy Council

Organizations

- Climate Hawks Vote
- Democracy for America
- International Longshore and Warehouse Union
- International Longshore and Warehouse Union, Local 13
- International Longshore and Warehouse Union, Local 63
- International Longshore and Warehouse Union, Local 94
- International Union of Painters and Allied Trades District Council 36
- Orange County Young Democrats

===== Mai Khanh Tran =====
Mai Khanh Tran is a pediatrician. Despite pressure from Democratic officials, she refused to drop out, saying she was "the only qualified woman, the only immigrant and the only physician in the race".

Mai-Khanh Tran (D)

U.S. representatives

- Lois Frankel (D-FL-21)

State assembly members

- Kansen Chu (D-25)
- Ash Kalra (D-27)

Local-level officials

- Katrina Foley, Costa Mesa City councilwoman
- Amy Thomas Howorth, Manhattan Beach mayor
- Wayne Lee, Millbrae councilman
- Polly Low, mayor of Rosemead
- Michele Martinez, Santa Ana mayor pro tem
- Diedre Thu-Ha Nguyen, Garden Grove City councilwoman
- Ali Sajjad Taj, Artesia city councilman

Educators

- Dr. Shin Liu, Cerritos College Board of Trustees
- Jamison Powers, Westminster School Board

Organizations

- 314 Action
- AAPI Victory Fund
- Asian American Action Fund
- ASPIRE PAC
- California API Legislative Caucus
- CAPA 21
- Emily's List
- Feminist Majority Foundation
- Korean American Democratic Committee
- The Progressive Vietnamese American Organization (PIVOT)

=== Primary election polling ===
Poll source	Date(s) administered	Sample size	Margin of error	Gil Cisneros (D)	Steve Cox (NPP)	Bob Huff (R)	Sam Jammal (D)	Young Kim (R)	Shawn Nelson (R)	Andy Thorburn (D)	Mai-Khanh Tran (D)	Steve Vargas (R)	Other	Undecided
Tulchin Research (D-Cisneros)	May 16–20, 2018	500	± 4.4%	20%	–	14%	7%	14%	8%	11%	5%	6%	1%	15%
Mellman Group (D-Thorburn)	March 30 – April 7, 2018	400	± 4.9%	11%	–	10%	4%	13%	10%	11%	6%	–	–	35%
Tulchin Research (D–Cisneros)	March 18–25, 2018	700	± 3.7%	19%	–	12%	4%	11%	13%	10%	6%	2%	3%	20%
Change Research (D)	March 4–8, 2018	680	—	16%	–	19%	–	22%	9%	16%	6%	–	11%	–
Change Research (D)	March 4–8, 2018	680	—	10%	5%	12%	5%	15%	6%	8%	4%	7%	33%	–

=== Fundraising ===
Millionaires Andy Thorburn and Gil Cisneros loaned their campaigns $2.3 million and $2 million respectively. As of March 31, Kim had raised more than $600,000, according to FEC filings, fourth most in the race and the most for a Republican. Kim received $178,000 in mailers and web ads, and $316,998 altogether, from the American Future Fund. The California Freedom and Prosperity Fund PAC spent about $85,000 opposing Kim, while spending five figures boosting Nelson.

In May, the race in the 39th district had seen the fourth most money spent of any House race in the nation. As of June, $10 million had been spent, making the race the most expensive in the state.

=== Advertising ===
Young Kim was the first Republican in the election to launch a TV ad. The ad highlighted her connection to Royce, her record as a state legislator, and her family history. Two Democrats in the race, Navy veteran and lottery winner Gil Cisneros and Andy Thorburn, also launched TV ads in April. Sam Jammal narrated an advertisement from a dog's point of view.

As of May 15, 2018, House Majority PAC and Priorities USA Action planned to air ads targeting Bob Huff and Shawn Nelson, in an effort to help their chosen candidate, Cisneros. The Democratic Congressional Campaign Committee, a week prior, had made a nearly $450,000 ad buy targeting those same two candidates. The anti-Nelson ad accused him of hypocrisy over pensions. The anti-Huff ad said, "He huffs and he puffs but would make your taxes go up."

The DCCC ads did not target Young Kim, who was seen as the leading Republican and was endorsed by Royce to succeed him, since the purpose of the ads was to put a Democrat in the top two by ensuring that Kim was the only Republican to reach the general election. As of May, the DCCC undertook an operation including mailers and digital ads (via platforms such as Google, Facebook, Instagram, and Snapchat), aimed at registering and turning out the party's voters.

Cisneros and Thorburn each launched dueling websites panning their rival. Cisneros's campaign accused Thorburn of tax evasion, while Thorburn's camp had a site calling Cisneros a gun lover. In May, California Democratic Party Chairman Eric Bauman announced that he had helped to engineer a deal between Thorburn and Cisneros to stop attacking each other and instead focus on "promoting their positive visions" and "highlighting their contrast with the corrupt, incompetent Trump Republicans." Both candidates took down their negative websites against each other.

In May, the DCCC announced its first Spanish-language midterm TV ad in favor of Cisneros. The ad criticized Republicans for trying to cut funds for education and student aid, and for denying Dreamers a path to citizenship. Meanwhile, House Majority PAC sent out mailing pieces to Republican and independent voters tying Phil Liberatore to President Trump, a move to raise the underfunded Liberatore's name recognition and try to siphon off votes from other GOP candidates to him. The ads point out Liberatore's desire for a border wall and an end to sanctuary cities, and his endorsement by Joe Arpaio.

=== Primary results ===
Results by county Kim: 20–30% Cisneros: 20–30% Liberatore: 20–30%

California's 39th congressional district election, 2018
Party	Candidate	Votes	%
Republican	Young Kim	30,019	21.2
Democratic	Gil Cisneros	27,469	19.4
Republican	Phil Liberatore	20,257	14.3
Democratic	Andy Thorburn	12,990	9.2
Republican	Shawn Nelson	9,750	6.9
Republican	Bob Huff	8,699	6.2
Democratic	Sam Jammal	7,613	5.4
Democratic	Mai-Khanh Tran	7,430	5.3
Democratic	Herbert H. Lee	5,988	4.2
Republican	Steven C. Vargas	4,144	2.9
Democratic	Suzi Park Leggett	2,058	1.5
Republican	John J. Cullum	1,747	1.2
No party preference	Karen Lee Schatzle	903	0.6
No party preference	Steve Cox	856	0.6
Republican	Andrew Sarega	823	0.6
American Independent	Sophia J. Alexander	523	0.4
American Independent	Ted Alemayhu	176	0.1
Total votes		141,445	100.0

== General election ==
The primary election was held on June 5, 2018. Under election rules, the top two vote-getters in the jungle primary advanced to the November general election, regardless of party affiliation. Republican Assemblywoman Young Kim and Democrat Gil Cisneros came in first and second place respectively, advancing to the general election.

=== Debate ===
2018 California's 39th congressional district debate
No.	Date	Host	Moderator	Link	Republican	Democratic
Key: P Participant A Absent N Not invited I Invited W Withdrawn						
Key: P Participant A Absent N Not invited I Invited W Withdrawn					Young Kim	Gil Cisneros
1	Oct. 16, 2018	KOCE-TV	Rick Reiff		P	P

=== Predictions ===
Source	Ranking	As of
538	Tossup	November 6, 2018
Daily Kos	Tossup	November 5, 2018
RCP	Tossup	November 5, 2018
Sabato's Crystal Ball	Lean R	November 5, 2018
Inside Elections	Tossup	November 5, 2018
The Cook Political Report	Tossup	November 5, 2018

=== Polling ===
In the three months prior to the election, FiveThirtyEight projected a close race, with Kim and Cisneros each respectively having a 65.2% and 62.2% chance of winning at their peak.

Poll source	Date(s) administered	Sample size	Margin of error	Young Kim (R)	Gil Cisneros (D)	Undecided
NYT Upshot/Siena College	October 18–23, 2018	496	± 4.6%	46%	47%	7%
Tulchin Research (D-Cisneros)	September 28 – October 2, 2018	400	± 4.9%	47%	48%	4%
UC Berkeley	September 16–23, 2018	552	± 6.0%	48%	49%	3%
Monmouth University	September 13–16, 2018	300 LV	± 5.7%	51%	41%	8%
Monmouth University	September 13–16, 2018	402 RV	± 4.9%	46%	42%	12%
Tulchin Research (D-Cisneros)	August 1–6, 2018	600	± 4.0%	42%	53%	5%
DCCC (D)	June 10, 2018	–	–	45%	43%	–
Remington (R)	January 10–11, 2018	761	± 3.48%	41%	38%	–

Hypothetical polling

Poll source	Date(s) administered	Sample size	Margin of error	Young Kim (R)	Mai Khanh Tran (D)	Undecided
Remington Research Group	January 10–11, 2018	761	± 3.48%	42%	33%	25%

Poll source	Date(s) administered	Sample size	Margin of error	Ed Royce (R)	Gil Cisneros (D)	Undecided
Tulchin Research (D–Gil Cisneros)	November 12–19, 2017	500	± 4.4%	48%	44%	8%

Poll source	Date(s) administered	Sample size	Margin of error	Ed Royce (R)	Democratic Opponent (D)	Undecided
PPP/Patriot Majority USA	December 11–12, 2017	—	—	43%	46%	11%

Poll source	Date(s) administered	Sample size	Margin of error	Generic Republican (R)	Generic Democrat (D)	Undecided
PPP/Patriot Majority USA	February 12–13, 2018	657	± 3.8%	43%	45%	12%
Remington Research Group	January 10–11, 2018	761	± 3.48%	47%	47%	6%

=== Results ===
The general election was held on November 6. In the first few days following the election, Young Kim was leading in the reported results. However, ballots in California only have to be postmarked on election day, and other races in California might have shifted from Republican election night leads to Democratic victories. The Mercury News reported speculation that Democratic swings in the days following the election were "due to Democratic voters being more likely to cast their ballots on election day or mail them in at the last minute, instead of voting early". This is a documented example of the American electoral phenomenon of blue shift. Over the next few days, Cisneros pulled ahead of Young Kim. On November 17, AP News projected that Cisneros had won the election. County officials published their final results on December 7, 2018.

California's 39th congressional district election, 2018
Party	Candidate	Votes	%
Democratic	Gil Cisneros	126,002	51.6
Republican	Young Kim	118,391	48.4
Total votes		244,393	100.0
Democratic gain from Republican			

=== Results by county ===
Results by county. Blue represents counties won by Cisneros. Red represents counties won by Kim.

County	Cisneros (D)		Kim (R)		Total
County	Votes	%	Votes	%	Votes
Los Angeles	34,356	58.2%	24,725	41.8%	59,081
Orange	78,059	49.3%	80,123	50.7%	158,182
San Bernardino	13,587	50.1%	13,543	49.9%	27,130
Totals	126,002	51.6%	118,391	48.4%	229,860
