= Gil Cisneros =

American politician (born 1971)

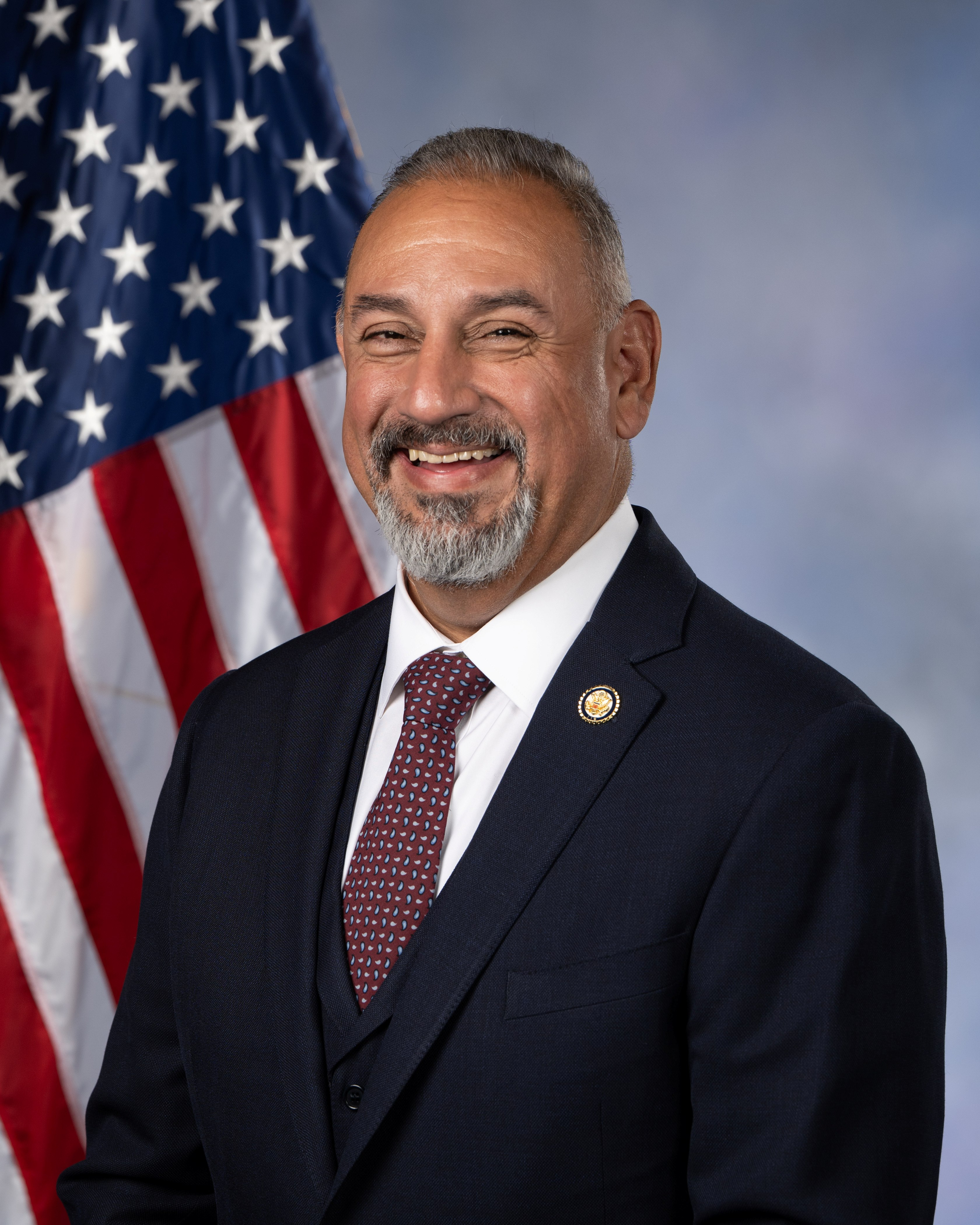
- Official portrait, 2025

Member of the U.S. House of Representatives from California
- Incumbent
- Assumed office January 3, 2025
- Preceded by: Grace Napolitano
- Constituency: 31st district
- In office January 3, 2019 – January 3, 2021
- Preceded by: Ed Royce
- Succeeded by: Young Kim
- Constituency: 39th district

10th Under Secretary of Defense for Personnel and Readiness
- In office August 24, 2021 – September 8, 2023
- President: Joe Biden
- Preceded by: Matthew Donovan
- Succeeded by: Anthony Tata

Personal details
- Born: Gilbert Ray Cisneros Jr. February 12, 1971 (age 55) Torrance, California, U.S.
- Party: Democratic (2008–present)
- Other political affiliations: Republican (before 2008)
- Spouse: Jacki
- Children: 2
- Education: George Washington University (BA); Regis University (MBA); Brown University (MA)
- Website: House website Campaign website

Military service
- Allegiance: United States
- Branch/service: United States Navy
- Years of service: 1994–2004
- Rank: Lieutenant Commander
- Awards: Navy Commendation Medal; Navy Achievement Medal

Gilbert Ray Cisneros Jr. (born February 12, 1971) is an American politician and former naval officer serving as the U.S. representative for California's 31st congressional district since 2025. A member of the Democratic Party, he previously served as Under Secretary of Defense for Personnel and Readiness in the Biden administration and was the U.S. representative for California's 39th congressional district from 2019 to 2021.

In 2010, he and his wife won a $266 million Mega Millions lottery jackpot and became philanthropists. He was elected to the House in 2018 to represent California's 39th congressional district. He was defeated in his 2020 bid for reelection by former California State Assembly member Young Kim, whom he had defeated in 2018. In April 2021, he was nominated by President Biden to serve as Under Secretary of Defense for Personnel and Readiness, and after confirmation by the Senate, he assumed office on August 24, 2021.

On August 1, 2023, he announced he was stepping down from his position in the Pentagon in early September. On September 18, he announced his candidacy for California's 31st congressional district and defeated Republican Daniel Martinez in the 2024 election.

== Early life and education ==
Cisneros was born in Torrance, of Californio heritage. His great-grandmother was born in Los Angeles when it was still part of Mexico. His mother worked in a cafeteria, while his father served in the Vietnam War where he suffered from exposure to Agent Orange. He is Hispanic.

Cisneros served in the United States Navy as a supply officer for 11 years. He was discharged from the Navy in 2004, as a lieutenant commander, and his decorations included the Navy Commendation Medal and Navy Achievement Medal. He earned his Bachelor of Arts in political science from George Washington University and his Master of Business Administration from Regis University.

== Career ==
Cisneros worked as a shipping and manufacturing manager for Frito-Lay until he was laid off in 2010.

=== Lottery win ===
Weeks after he was laid off, Cisneros won a Mega Millions jackpot worth $266 million. He and his wife became philanthropists, establishing endowments for scholarships to be given to Latino students at GWU and the University of Southern California. They also founded Generation First Degree Pico Rivera, with the goal of ensuring every Latino household in Pico Rivera has at least one college graduate, and the Gilbert and Jacki Cisneros Foundation with an initial investment of $20 million to provide mentorship in education.

Gil Cisneros' work in philanthropy led him to an appointment by President Barack Obama to be on the Advisory Committee on the Arts for the John F. Kennedy Center for the Performing Arts in 2014.

=== Continuing education ===
After setting up the foundation, Cisneros earned a Master of Arts from Brown University in Urban Education Policy, and an MBA from Regis University.

== U.S. House of Representatives ==
=== Elections ===
==== 2018 ====
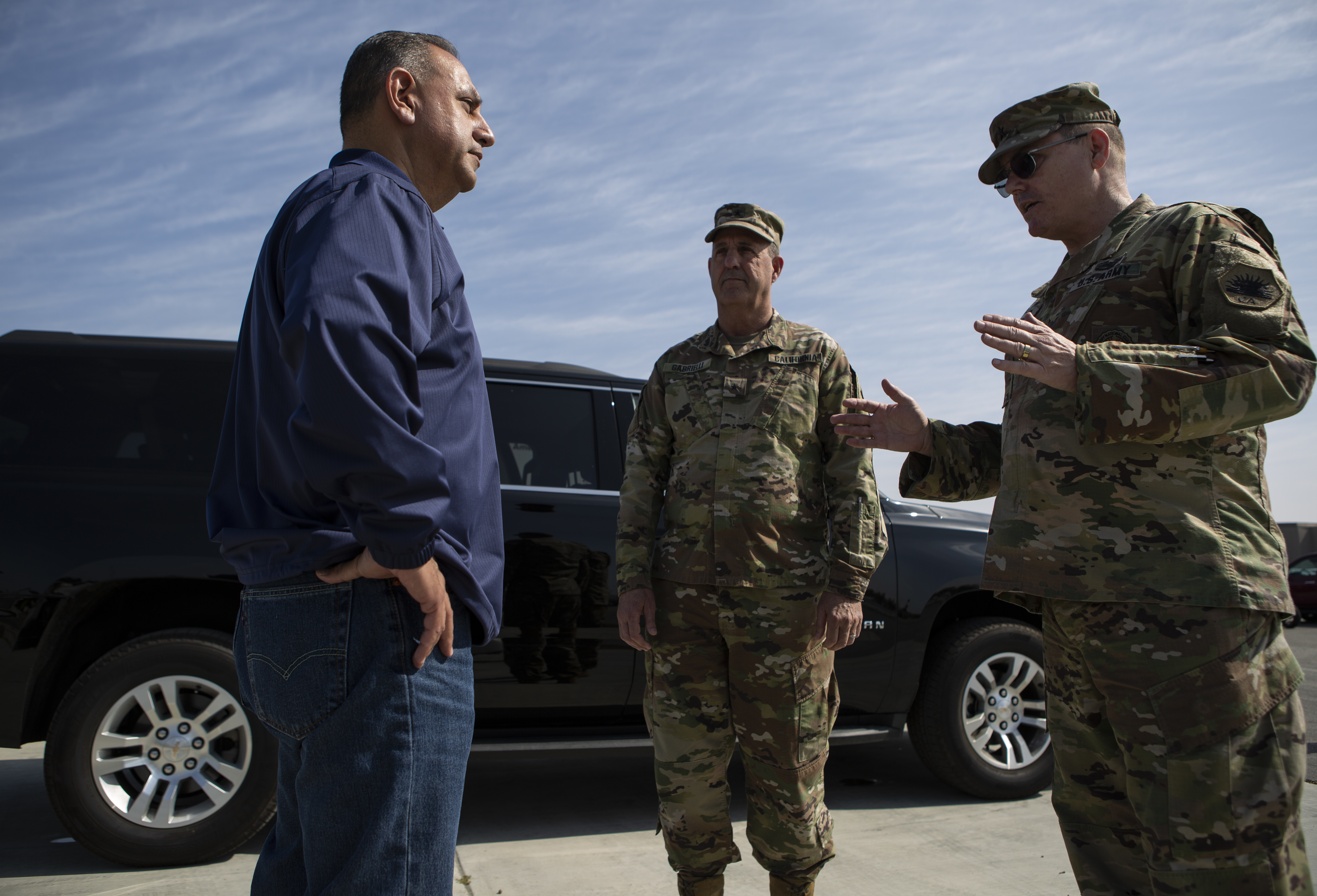
Cisneros meets with California State Military Reserve, 2019

Cisneros was a Republican until 2008, but left the party because he felt it had become "too ideological" and switched to the Democratic Party.

In 2017, he declared his candidacy against Ed Royce in the 2018 election for the United States House of Representatives to represent California's 39th congressional district. He specifically cited Royce's vote to repeal the 2010 Patient Protection and Affordable Care Act, also known as Obamacare, as a reason he chose to run. In January 2018, Royce announced he would retire rather than seek reelection to a 14th term. Later, the election attracted national attention as the "weirdest race in the country" after the California Democratic Party and the Democratic Congressional Campaign Committee brokered a truce on negative campaigning between Cisneros and Andy Thorburn, who had spent a combined eight million dollars on their campaigns.

Fears of a lockout by either party were not realized when Cisneros advanced to the November runoff election, finishing second in the June primary election to Republican former state Assemblywoman Young Kim, with 19.35% of the vote. This election was rated a "Toss-up" by the Cook Political Report and Sabato's Crystal Ball. The Associated Press called the election for Cisneros on November 17.

==== 2020 ====
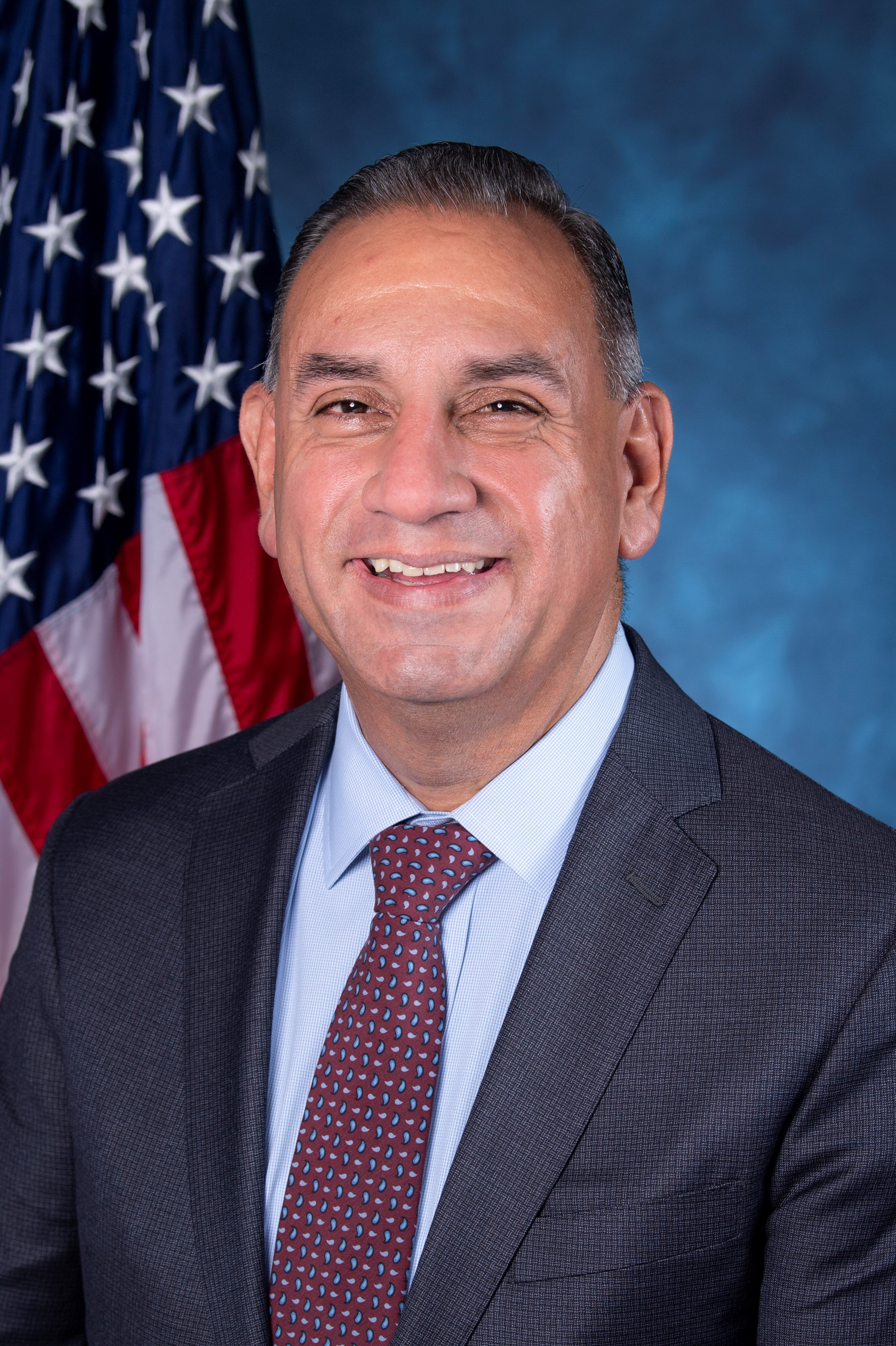
Cisneros's portrait from his first term in Congress.

Cisneros lost to Young Kim by a margin of 1.2% in the 2020 House of Representatives election for California's 39th congressional district, in a rematch of the 2018 election.

==== 2024 ====
On September 18, 2023, Cisneros announced his intention to make a return to Congress by announcing his candidacy for the vacant 31st congressional district seat that became available with the retirement of Grace Napolitano. He defeated Republican Daniel Martinez in the 2024 election.

=== Committee assignments ===
Current

- Committee on Armed Services (116th and 119th Congresses)
  - Subcommittee on Intelligence and Special Operations (119th Congress)
  - Subcommittee on Military Personnel (116th and 119th Congresses)
  - Subcommittee on Seapower and Projection Forces (116th Congress)
- Committee on Small Business
  - Subcommittee on Contracting and Infrastructure (Ranking Member)
  - Subcommittee on Oversight, Investigations, and Regulations

Former

- Committee on Veterans' Affairs (116th Congress)
  - Subcommittee on Disability Assistance and Memorial Affairs
  - Subcommittee on Health
  - Subcommittee on Oversight and Investigations

=== Caucus memberships ===
- Congressional Equality Caucus
- Congressional Asian Pacific American Caucus
- Congressional Hispanic Caucus
- New Democrat Coalition
- Congressional Progressive Caucus
- Congressional Taiwan Caucus
- Congressional Freethought Caucus

== Biden–Harris administration ==
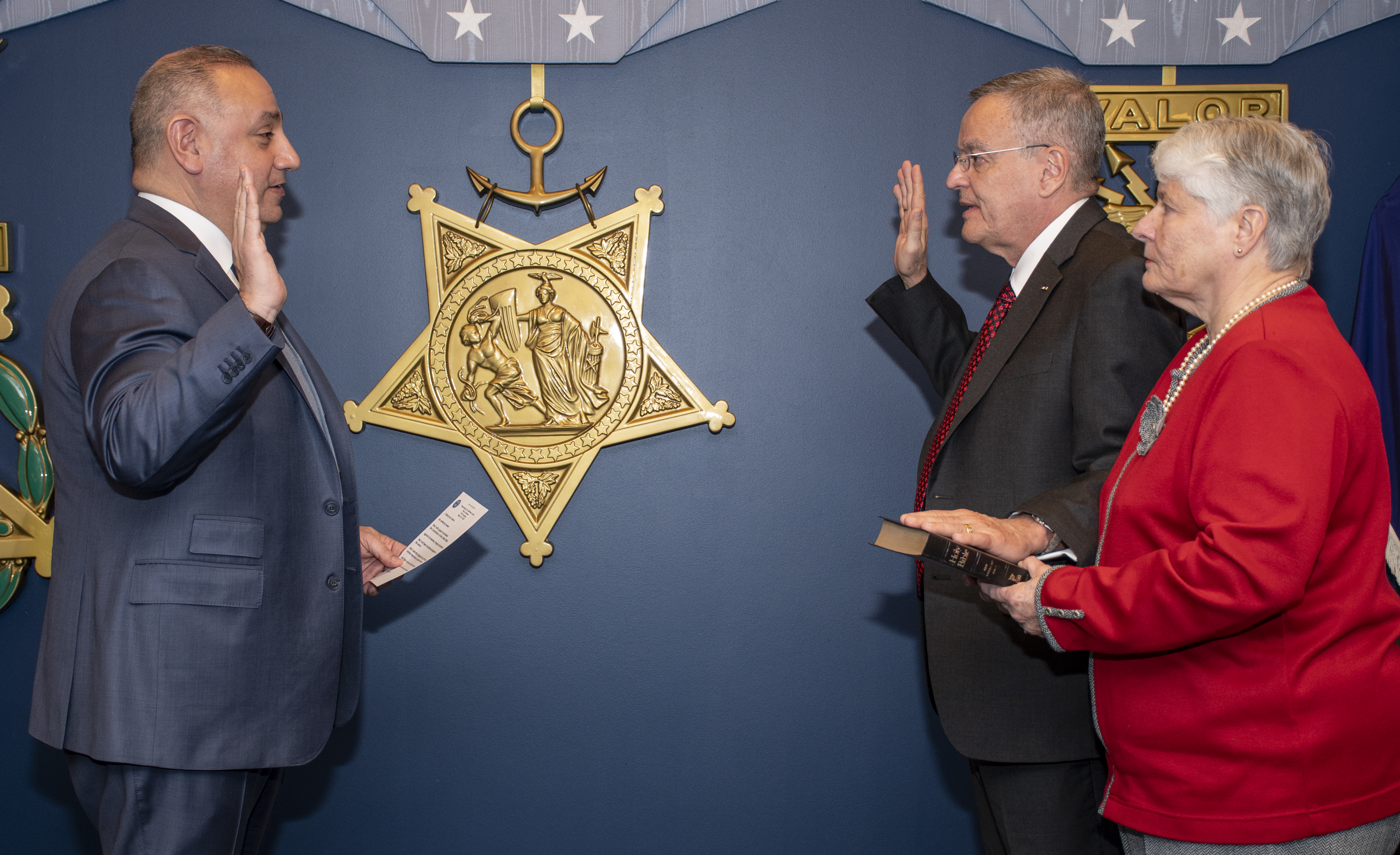
Cisneros is sworn in as Under Secretary of Defense for Personnel and Readiness in 2023

On April 12, 2021, the White House announced that Cisneros would be nominated to serve as Under Secretary of Defense for Personnel and Readiness in the Biden administration; his nomination was received on April 27. On July 27, the Senate Armed Services Committee (SASC) voted to advance Cisneros's nomination to the full chamber for a future vote. Cisneros was confirmed unanimously by the Senate on August 11, 2021, by voice vote, and he was sworn in on August 24, 2021. He served in that position until September 8, 2023.

== Electoral history ==
California's 39th congressional district election, 2018
Primary election
Party	Candidate	Votes	%
Republican	Young Kim	30,019	21.2
Democratic	Gil Cisneros	27,469	19.4
Republican	Phil Liberatore	20,257	14.3
Democratic	Andy Thorburn	12,990	9.2
Republican	Shawn Nelson	9,750	6.9
Republican	Bob Huff	8,699	6.2
Democratic	Sam Jammal	7,613	5.4
Democratic	Mai-Khanh Tran	7,430	5.3
Democratic	Herbert H. Lee	5,988	4.2
Republican	Steven C. Vargas	4,144	2.9
Democratic	Suzi Park Leggett	2,058	1.5
Republican	John J. Cullum	1,747	1.2
No party preference	Karen Lee Schatzle	903	0.6
No party preference	Steve Cox	856	0.6
Republican	Andrew Sarega	823	0.6
American Independent	Sophia J. Alexander	523	0.4
American Independent	Ted Alemayhu	176	0.1
Total votes		141,445	100.0
General election
Democratic	Gil Cisneros	126,002	51.6
Republican	Young Kim	118,391	48.4
Total votes		229,860	100.0
Democratic gain from Republican			

California's 39th congressional district election, 2020
Primary election
Party	Candidate	Votes	%
Republican	Young Kim	83,941	48.3
Democratic	Gil Cisneros (incumbent)	81,402	46.9
No party preference	Steve Cox	8,286	4.8
Total votes		173,629	100.0
General election
Republican	Young Kim	173,946	50.6
Democratic	Gil Cisneros (incumbent)	169,837	49.4
Total votes		343,783	100.0
Republican gain from Democratic			

California's 31st congressional district election, 2024
Primary election
Party	Candidate	Votes	%
Democratic	Gil Cisneros	23,888	23.6
Republican	Daniel Martinez	19,464	19.2
Republican	Pedro Casas	17,077	16.9
Democratic	Susan Rubio	16,006	15.8
Democratic	Bob Archuleta	10,151	10.0
Democratic	Mary Ann Lutz	6,629	6.5
Democratic	Greg Hafif	4,914	4.9
Democratic	Kurt Jose	1,415	1.4
No party preference	Erskine Levi	1,166	1.2
No party preference	Marie Manvel	534	0.5
Total votes		101,244	100.0
General election
Democratic	Gil Cisneros	148,095	59.7
Republican	Daniel Martinez	99,856	40.3
Total votes		247,951	100.0
Democratic hold			

California's 31st congressional district election, 2026
Primary election
Party	Candidate	Votes	%
Democratic	Gil Cisneros (incumbent)	94,805	61.1
Republican	Eric Ching	36,999	23.8
Republican	Erskine Levi	23,449	15.1
Total votes		155,253	100.0

== Personal life ==
Cisneros and his wife Jacki have twin sons. They own a home in Pico Rivera, and lived in Newport Beach until they moved to Yorba Linda in late 2017, the year he began running for election. Before Cisneros won the lottery, Jacki worked for KNBC in Los Angeles. Gil currently resides in Covina, California. He is Catholic.

== See also ==
- List of Hispanic and Latino Americans in the United States Congress
- List of new members of the 119th United States Congress

U.S. House of Representatives
Preceded by Ed Royce	Member of the U.S. House of Representatives from California's 39th congressional district 2019–2021	Succeeded by Young Kim
Preceded by Grace Napolitano	Member of the U.S. House of Representatives from California's 31st congressional district 2025–present	Incumbent
Political offices
Preceded by Matthew Donovan	Under Secretary of Defense for Personnel and Readiness; 2021–2023	Succeeded by Ashish Vazirani; Acting
U.S. order of precedence (ceremonial)
Preceded by Tony Wied	United States representatives by seniority 363rd	Succeeded by Yassamin Ansari
