= Corey Jackson (politician) =

American politician (born 1982)

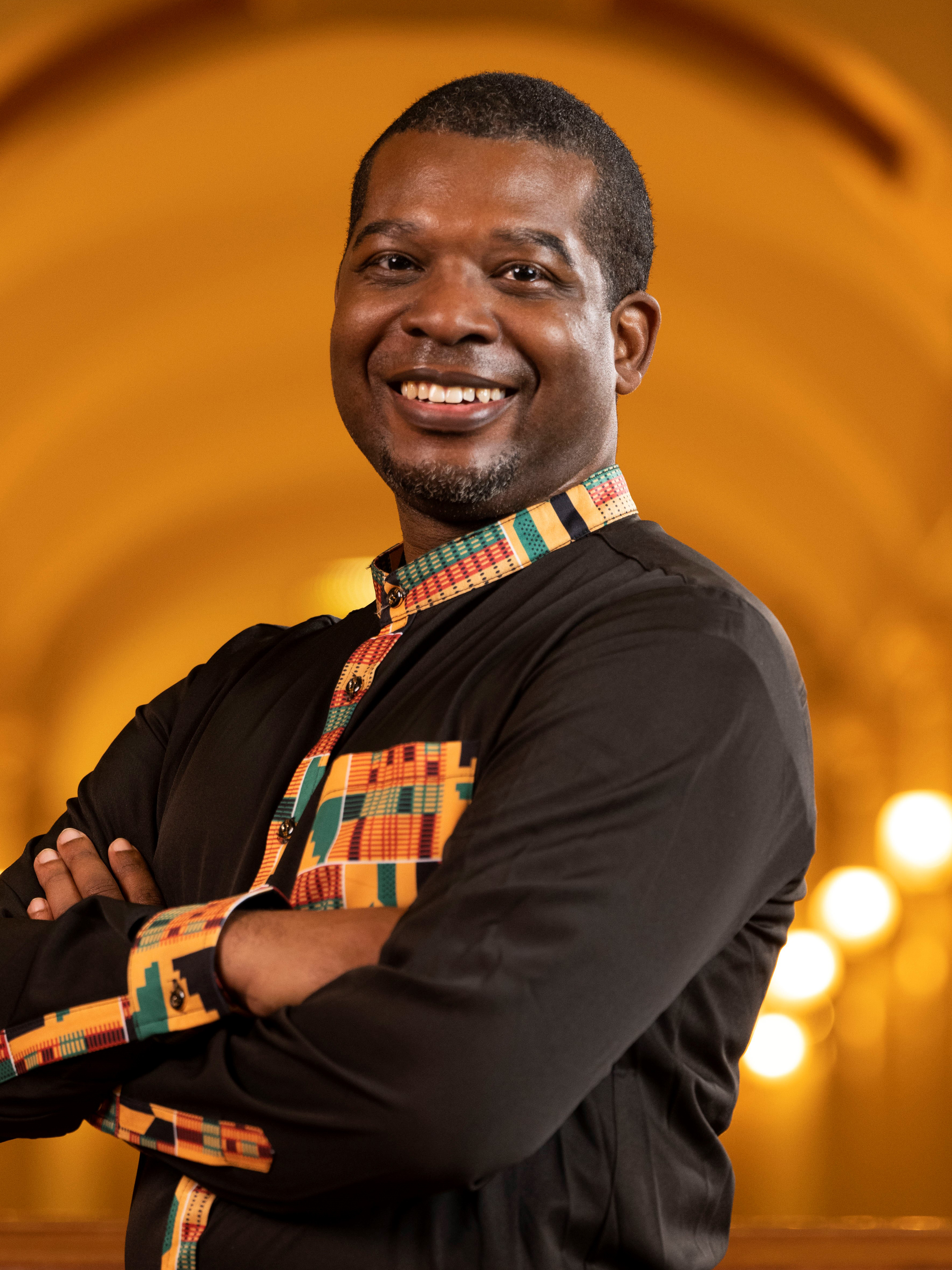
- Official portrait, 2022

Member of the California State Assembly from the 60th district
- Incumbent
- Assumed office December 5, 2022
- Preceded by: Sabrina Cervantes

Personal details
- Born: 1982 (age 43–44) Perris, California
- Party: Democratic

Corey Jackson (born 1982) is an American politician currently serving in the California State Assembly. A member of the Democratic Party, he represents California's 60th State Assembly district, which includes the northwestern corner of Riverside County and is anchored by the city of Moreno Valley. He is the first openly gay black man in the history of the California Legislature, and the first black person to represent Riverside County.

== Education ==
Jackson was a student member of the California State University Board of Trustees. He received his Master and Doctor of Social Work degrees from California Baptist University.

== Political career ==
In 2020, Corey Jackson was elected to the Riverside County School Board.

In the 2022 California State Assembly election, Jackson defeated Republican restaurant owner Hector Diaz-Nava.

Jackson is a member of the California Legislative Progressive Caucus.

== Electoral history ==
=== Riverside County Board of Education ===
2020 Riverside County Board of Education 3rd district election
Candidate	Votes	%
Corey Jackson	31,583	65.7
Dominic Zarecki	16,506	34.3
Total votes	48,089	100.0

=== California State Assembly ===
2022 California State Assembly 60th district election
Primary election
Party	Candidate	Votes	%
Republican	Hector Diaz-Nava	16,518	39.9
Democratic	Corey Jackson	11,158	27.0
Democratic	Esther Portillo	8,219	19.9
Democratic	Jasmin Rubio	5,471	13.2
Total votes		41,366	100.0
General election
Democratic	Corey Jackson	39,260	54.7
Republican	Hector Diaz-Nava	32,574	45.3
Total votes		71,834	100.0
Democratic hold			

2024 California State Assembly 60th district election
Primary election
Party	Candidate	Votes	%
Democratic	Corey Jackson (incumbent)	22,921	51.8
Republican	Ron Edwards	12,021	27.1
Republican	Hector Diaz Nava	9,336	21.1
Total votes		44,278	100.0
General election
Democratic	Corey Jackson (incumbent)	71,922	55.4
Republican	Ron Edwards	58,017	44.6
Total votes		129,939	100.0
Democratic hold			
