= Eric Linder =

American politician

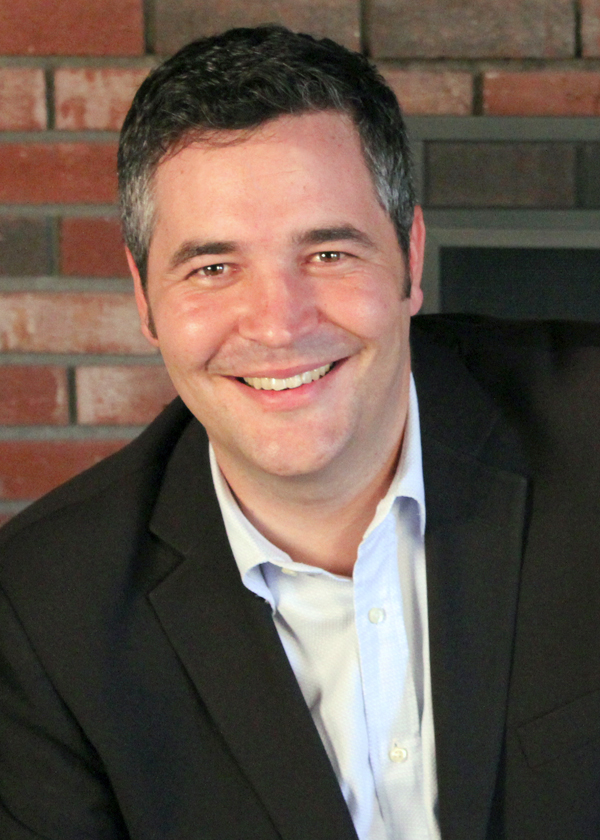

Member of the California State Assembly from the 60th district
- In office December 3, 2012 – November 30, 2016
- Preceded by: Curt Hagman (redistricted)
- Succeeded by: Sabrina Cervantes

Personal details
- Born: Eric Frederic Linder; October 9, 1978 (age 47) Whittier, California
- Party: Republican
- Spouse: Tiffany (m. 2021)
- Children: 3

Eric Frederic Linder (born October 9, 1978) is an American politician who once served in the California State Assembly. He is a Republican who represented the 60th Assembly District, encompassing far western Riverside County. Prior to being elected to the Assembly in 2012, he was a business owner and vice chair of the Riverside County Republican Party.

After being re-elected in 2014, Linder was defeated in his bid for re-election to a third term in 2016 by Democrat Sabrina Cervantes.

In 2018, Linder ran for the Riverside County Board of Supervisors, but was defeated by Corona Mayor Karen Spiegel.

== 2014 California State Assembly election ==
California's 60th State Assembly district election, 2014
Primary election
Party	Candidate	Votes	%
Republican	Eric Linder (incumbent)	20,248	98.6
Democratic	Ken Park (write-in)	144	0.7
Democratic	Oliver Unaka (write-in)	118	0.6
Libertarian	John Farr (write-in)	34	0.2
Total votes		20,544	100.0
General election
Republican	Eric Linder (incumbent)	34,348	61.5
Democratic	Ken Park	21,508	38.5
Total votes		55,855	100.0
Republican hold			

== 2016 California State Assembly election ==
California's 60th State Assembly district election, 2016
Primary election
Party	Candidate	Votes	%
Republican	Eric Linder (incumbent)	30,048	45.6
Democratic	Sabrina Cervantes	27,346	41.5
Democratic	Ken Park	8,478	12.9
Total votes		65,872	100.0
General election
Democratic	Sabrina Cervantes	77,404	54.5
Republican	Eric Linder (incumbent)	64,710	45.5
Total votes		142,114	100.0
Democratic gain from Republican			
