= Horcher =

Horcher is a surname. Notable people with the surname include:

- Darrell Horcher (born 1987), American mixed martial artist
- Paul Horcher (born 1951), American politician
