= Sally Tanner =

American politician (1926–2021)

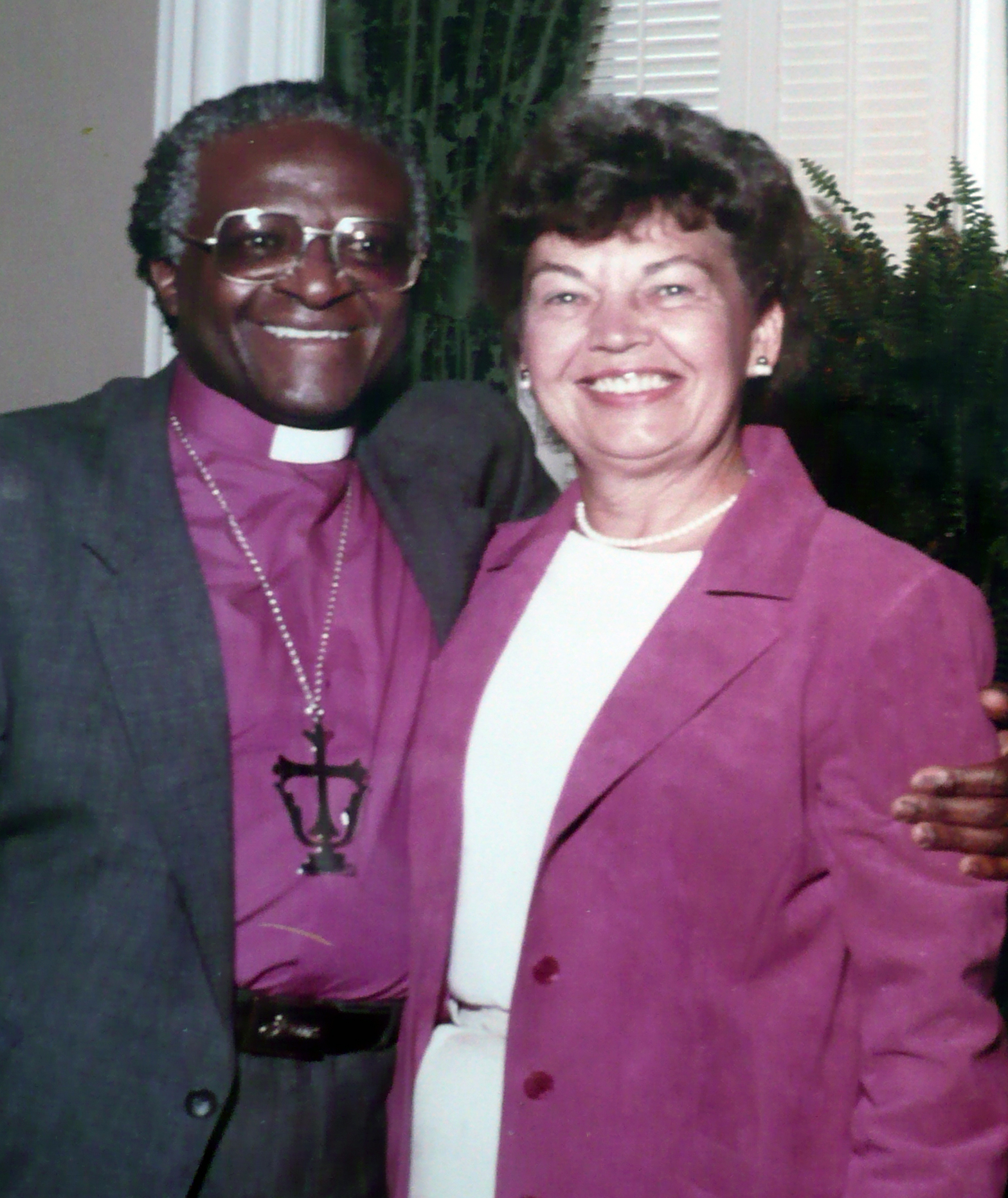
- Rev. Desmond Tutu and Sally Tanner during his visit to California in 1986

Member of the California State Assembly from the 60th district
- In office December 4, 1978 – November 30, 1992
- Preceded by: Joseph B. Montoya
- Succeeded by: Paul Horcher

Personal details
- Born: December 28, 1926 East Chicago, Indiana, U.S.
- Died: August 20, 2021 (aged 94) Ferndale, California, U.S.
- Party: Democratic
- Spouse: Patricia Hofstetter
- Children: 2
- Education: Pasadena Community College
- Occupation: advertising design and commercial art

Sally Tanner (December 28, 1926 – August 20, 2021) was an American politician who represented California's 60th District in the California State Assembly from 1978 to 1992. During her legislative career she served as chair of the Environmental Safety and Toxic Materials Committee. Tanner authored a consumer protection act that came to be colloquially referred to as the California Lemon Law (lemon law). In 1987 she co-founded the legislature's "Woman of the Year" program. She became a recipient of the honor in 2009. She was a Democrat.

== Education and background ==
Tanner attended Pasadena Community College and the Art Center School of Design in Los Angeles, California, after which she worked in advertising design and commercial art. She married and had two sons, Timothy and Christopher.

== Political career ==
Tanner's political career began as a volunteer for the 1956 Adlai Stevenson II presidential campaign followed by experience as an Administrative Assistant to both 58th District California Assemblyman Harvey Johnson for ten years and Congressman George E. Danielson. In 1979 Tanner ran for Representative from California's 60th District and served for 14 years.

In 1981, she helped Willie Brown become California's first African American Speaker of the Assembly. When he helped create California's first standing committee on the environment, the Environmental Safety and Toxic Materials Committee, Tanner was appointed the first chair. The committee generally considered bills relating to environmental pollutants, chemical and toxic hazards, and product safety.

Tanner introduced numerous bills to clean up the environment throughout her career. In 1982, she authored a California law (Civil Code Section § 1793.22 et. seq.) which was officially named the Tanner Consumer Protection Act, even though commonly and officially known as the "California Lemon Law." It mandates refunds, replacements or compensation to consumers for life-threatening problems unfixed in new vehicles for the first 18,000 miles or 18 months, whichever is first. On 1 January 2001, the law was amended to consider a vehicle a lemon if two repair attempts fail.

Tanner was a founding member of the California Legislative Women's Caucus in 1985. At the same time, she was appointed to the Governor's task force on waste, energy and technology and asked to formulate a state waste management plan by Governor George Deukmejian. In 1987, with Republican Assemblywoman Bev Hansen, Tanner co-founded the legislative "Woman of the Year" program.

== Later life and death ==
When she retired in 1992, Sally Tanner Park (34°5′25.03″N 118°5′14.25″W) in Rosemead, California and a street in El Monte was named Sally Tanner Drive in her honor.

In retirement in Ferndale, California, Tanner fished, read and painted, and started the local Democratic Caucus.

In 2009, as part of Women's History Month, Assemblyman Wes Chesbro named Tanner to be the First Assembly District's Woman of the Year. Chesbro said, "The Northcoast was very fortunate when one of California's great environmental leaders, Sally Tanner chose to move to Ferndale for her retirement. Sally has lived quietly in Ferndale, but she has been a great source of wisdom and advice for me and my predecessors in the Assembly, Patty Berg and Dan Hauser."

In 2013, Tanner and Patricia Hofstetter, a retired California municipal court judge, were the only two female competitors in the 31st Annual Chopper Steelhead Derby on the Smith and Chetco rivers which they won by catching and releasing the largest fish of the derby, a 36.5 inch steelhead.

Tanner died in Ferndale, California in August 2021 at the age of 94.

Political offices
Preceded by Joseph B. Montoya	California State Assembly, 60th District; December 4, 1978 – November 30, 1992	Succeeded by Paul Horcher
