= Dan W. Emmett =

American politician

Member of the California State Assembly from the 50th district
- In office January 5, 1931 - January 2, 1933
- Preceded by: Maurice S. Meeker
- Succeeded by: Frank Wimberly Wright

Member of the California State Assembly from the 60th district
- In office January 7, 1929 - January 5, 1931
- Preceded by: Walter H. Duval
- Succeeded by: Willis M. Baum

Personal details
- Born: March 8, 1886 Tennessee
- Died: September 7, 1966 (aged 80)
- Party: Republican
- Spouse: Eda F. Emmett (m. 1908, d. 1936)
- Children: 2

Military service
- Branch/service: United States Army
- Battles/wars: World War I

Dan Webster Emmett (March 8, 1886 - September 7, 1966) served in the California State Assembly for the 60th district from 1929 to 1931 and 50th district from 1931 to 1933. During World War I he served in the United States Army.
