= Gary Miller (politician) =

American politician (born 1948)

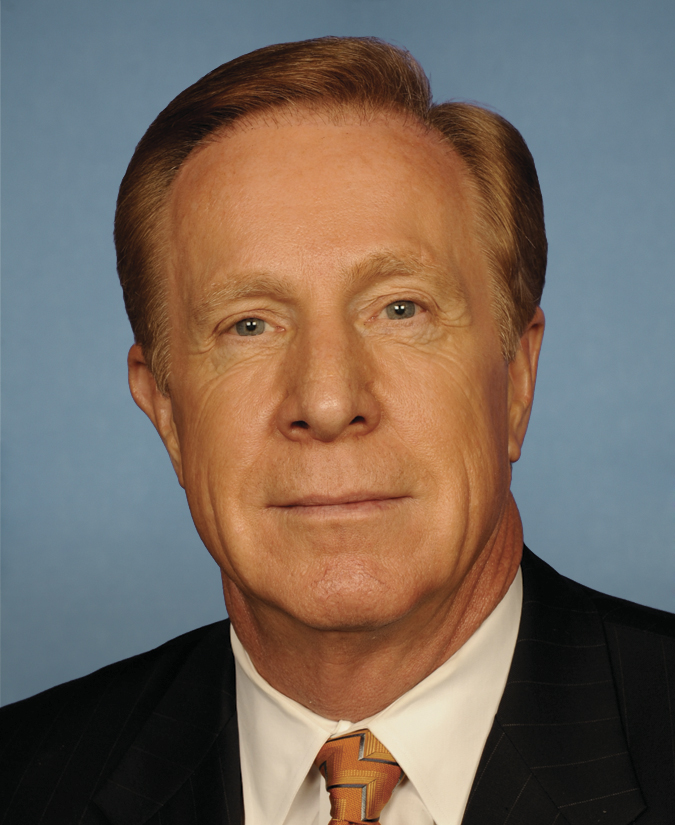

Member of the U.S. House of Representatives from California
- In office January 3, 1999 – January 3, 2015
- Preceded by: Jay Kim
- Succeeded by: Pete Aguilar
- Constituency: 41st district (1999–2003); 42nd district (2003–2013); 31st district (2013–2015)

Member of the California State Assembly from the 60th district
- In office May 18, 1995 – November 30, 1998
- Preceded by: Paul Horcher
- Succeeded by: Bob Pacheco

Personal details
- Born: October 16, 1948 (age 78) Huntsville, Arkansas, U.S.
- Party: Republican
- Spouse: Cathy Miller
- Children: 4
- Education: Mt. San Antonio College

Military service
- Allegiance: United States
- Branch/service: United States Army
- Years of service: September 1967 – October 1967

Gary Gene Miller (born October 16, 1948) is an American politician, who was the U.S. representative for California's 31st congressional district. A Republican, he was first elected in 1998 and served until 2015, when he retired. The district includes most of southern and western San Bernardino County. He previously represented the 42nd district from 1999 to 2013 (numbered as the 41st from 1993 to 2003). In February 2014, Miller announced he would step down at the next election.

== Early life, education, and business career ==
Miller was born in Huntsville, Arkansas, but grew up in Whittier, California. He attended Mount San Antonio College in Walnut, California, and served briefly in the United States Army in 1967 being discharged after seven weeks of boot camp at Fort Ord near Monterey.

He is a businessman who founded several companies bearing his name, including G. Miller Development, G. Miller Masonry, and G. Miller Framing. At the age of 20, he began his first company, which built single-family and custom homes. His business expanded to the development of planned communities. Miller remains active in real estate through his development company.

== Early political career (1988–1994) ==
=== Local politics ===
Miller was appointed to the Diamond Bar, California, Municipal Advisory Council in 1988. In 1989, he was elected to the city's first council that helped incorporate the city. He served as mayor in 1992.

=== State Senate elections ===
In 1990, he decided to run for a seat in the California Senate. Incumbent Republican State Senator Bill Campbell of the 31st District resigned the seat. In the February 1990 special election (open primary), Miller ranked fourth, or last, among Republicans in the field, getting just 16% of the vote.

In 1994, he decided to run for the vacant 29th District seat. In the open primary in September 1994, Miller ranked second among Republicans getting 21% of the vote, behind state Assemblyman Dick Mountjoy, who ranked first with 45% of the vote.

== California Assembly (1995–1999) ==
=== Elections ===
In 1995, Miller ran in a special election for a seat in the California State Assembly in the 60th district after incumbent Paul Horcher was recalled. Miller won the open primary with 39% of the vote in a six candidate field.

In 1996, he won re-election defeating Democrat Susan Amaya 53–47%. He was succeeded in the Assembly by Bob Pacheco.

=== Committee assignments ===
He was Chairman of the Assembly Budget Committee.

== U.S. House of Representatives (1999–2015) ==
=== Elections ===
He was elected to the U.S. House in 1998, defeating incumbent Republican and fellow Diamond Bar resident Jay Kim in the primary and then Democrat Eileen Ansari in the general election with 53 percent. He won again in 2000 with 59 percent of the vote and was re-elected in 2002 with 68 percent of the vote. In 2004, he defeated Democrat Lewis Myers with 71.5% of the vote. Similarly, he won in 2008 with 63.8% of the vote, defeating Democrat Ed Chau.

For his first seven terms in Congress, Miller represented a district comprising portions of northern and eastern Orange County, southern Los Angeles County and a small portion of San Bernardino County. After the 2010 United States census, Miller's district was renumbered as the 39th district, and pushed further into Orange County, making this already strongly Republican seat even more so. The new map also placed the home of fellow Republican and 10-term incumbent Ed Royce into the 39th, setting up what would have been the only primary contest between two California Republicans. Although the 39th was more Miller's district than Royce's (Miller retained 53 percent of his former territory), Royce was considered the stronger candidate. Partly due to this, Miller announced in January 2012 that he would run in the newly created 31st district, located entirely in San Bernardino County. Miller's move effectively ended the career of House Rules Committee chairman David Dreier, who had represented a large slice of the new 31st. As part of the move, he bought a second home in Rancho Cucamonga, which he now claims as his official residence.

On paper, Miller faced daunting odds. He was running in a district that he had never represented before, had a sizable Democratic lean and was majority-Hispanic. Had it existed in 2008, Barack Obama would have won it with 56 percent of the vote. However, due to California's new "top-two" primary system, the three Democrats in the field split the vote, allowing Miller to come in first with only 27 percent of the vote while a fellow Republican, State Senator Bob Dutton, came in second with 25 percent while three Democrats split the remaining 48 percent of the vote. In the general election, Miller defeated Dutton with 55 percent of the vote.

=== Tenure ===
Transportation and infrastructure

Congressman Miller was the most senior Republican from the California delegation on the House Committee on Transportation and Infrastructure. He served on the Highways and Transit; Railroads, Pipelines and Hazardous Materials; and Water Resources and Environment Subcommittees.

In 2005, Congressman Miller secured a provision in the 2005 SAFE-TEA LU Highway Reauthorization that initiated a pilot program where 5 states, including California would assume the responsibility for conducting the federal environmental review process required by the National Environmental Policy Act (NEPA). In California, the NEPA pilot program has shaved 17 months off of environmental review processes and 30 months off of overall project delivery.

Streamlining regulations and review for transportation projects

During the 112th Congress, Miller introduced legislation to build off the success of the 2005 pilot program to further improve highway project delivery by eliminating bureaucratic red tape and restoring greater control to state and local governments.

In June 2011, he introduced the Environmental Review Cooperation Act, which would make permanent a National Environmental Policy Act (NEPA) pilot program that authorizes five states—including California—to take on the responsibility of complying with NEPA for Federal Highway Administration (FHWA) funded projects. The bill would also expand the program to all states that have environmental standards that are equal to or exceed federal requirements.

In August 2011, Congressman Miller introduced the Breaking Down Barriers Act, which provides common sense proposals to make highway project delivery more efficient. HR 2766, The Breaking Down Barriers Act includes language that allows transportation agencies to move forward on construction activities prior to receiving grant funds, and requires prompt action by federal agencies by establishing deadlines for project approvals.

Energy

During the 111th Congress, Congressman Miller introduced a comprehensive energy bill that would reduce regulatory burdens that delay improvements and advancements in domestic energy production. The bill would open U.S. coastal waters for drilling, allow states to share a portion of the revenue derived from such drilling, and use the earnings from offshore drilling to pay down the national debt. The legislation also included energy tax incentives for wind, solar, biodiesel, clean coal technologies and other forms of energy. Congressman Miller stated his resolution and plan to lower gas prices and work for a long-term solution for the country.

In 2010 Miller signed a pledge sponsored by Americans for Prosperity promising to vote against any Global Warming legislation that would raise taxes.

Animal welfare

During the 111th and 112th Congresses, Congressman Miller cosponsored the Puppy Uniform Protection Statute (PUPS) Act, which sets out to close loopholes in the 1966 law that allows breeders to sell puppies over the Internet without federal oversight. Specifically, this legislation requires any breeder who sells or offers to sell more than 50 dogs annually directly to the public, including over the Internet, to be licensed and inspected. The bill would also require that dogs in commercial breeding facilities have appropriate space and daily exercise.

Congressman Miller was an original cosponsor of legislation in the 111th Congress to prohibit knowingly selling or offering to sell videos of animal crush videos in interstate or foreign commerce for commercial gain. This legislation, H.R. 5566, the Animal Crush Video Prohibition Act, was signed into law on December 9, 2010. In the 110th Congress, he sponsored the Animal Fighting Prohibition Enforcement Act, which imposes a fine and up to three years in jail for violations of the Animal Welfare Act related to sponsoring or exhibiting animals in an animal fighting venture and for buying, selling, or transporting any animal for participation in an animal fighting venture. This legislation became law on May 3, 2007.

Supporting breast cancer research

Congressman Miller cosponsored legislation supporting Breast Cancer Deadline 2020, a call to action for policymakers, researchers, breast cancer advocates, and other stakeholders to end the disease by the end of the decade. H.R. 3067 would create a commission to identify promising research, encourage partnerships between government and the private sector, and create opportunities for trans-disciplinary collaboration that may advance the mission of ending breast cancer. Congressman Miller also cosponsored H.R. 466, legislation to reauthorize the sale of the Breast Cancer Stamp, with proceeds from the stamp going to the National Institute of Health to fund breast cancer research. Congressman Miller is also a long time supporter of the Department of Defense Breast Cancer Research Program.

During the 111th and 112th Congresses, Congressman Miller sent a letter to House Appropriations Committee requesting that appropriators include $120 million for the Department of Defense (DOD) Breast Cancer Research Program (BCRP) in defense appropriations legislation.

Veterans

Congressman Miller supports continuing the extension of benefits to all veterans of the armed services of the United States. During the 112th Congress, Congressman Miller cosponsored the Veteran Skills to Jobs Act, which addresses the high rate of veteran unemployment by streamlining the bureaucratic processes for veterans with relevant training to get jobs when they return home. Specifically, H.R. 4155 would direct federal agencies to view relevant military training as the equivalent of federal licensing and certification requirements.

Congressman Miller also cosponsored H.R. 178, legislation to repeal the so-called "Widow's Tax" and ensure military widows and families of military heroes will be fully protected. H.R. 178, also known as the Military Surviving Spouses Equity Act, would repeal current law that requires a dollar-for-dollar deduction of VA benefits for service connected deaths from military survivors' Survivor Benefit Plan (SBP) annuity.

Anti-terrorism

In 2005, Miller cosponsored the Border Protection, Anti-terrorism and Illegal Immigration Control Act of 2005 (H.R. 4437) with representative Jim Sensenbrenner. In 2006, after widespread demonstrations by immigrants, Miller wrote: "Too bad their protest didn't include giving up government-paid social services—because a day without illegal aliens would be a boon to U.S. taxpayers."

Miller backed the development of a rail link between Ontario and Anaheim, part of a proposed 269-mile (433 km) line between Orange County and Las Vegas. "Once completed, there would be no need for an airport in south Orange County, and the Inland Empire will reap the economic benefits as a true transportation hub," Miller said.

Miller, a history buff, become involved in the preservation of Civil War battlefields, after he played a bit part in the 2003 movie Gods and Generals.

Miller signed the Taxpayer Protection Pledge.

In 2011, Miller voted for the National Defense Authorization Act for Fiscal Year 2012 as part of a controversial provision that allows the government and the military to indefinitely detain American citizens and others without trial.

Allegation of sheltering profits of real estate sales

Miller sold 165 acres (0.67 km^{2}) to the city of Monrovia, in 2002, making profit of more than $10 million. Normally, he would have had to pay state and federal taxes of up to 31% on that profit.

Miller told the Internal Revenue Service and the state of California that Monrovia had forced him to sell the property under threat of eminent domain. That allowed him to shelter the profits from capital gains taxes for more than two years before he had to reinvest the money.

Monrovia officials stated that Miller sold the land willingly and that they didn't threaten to force him to sell. A videotape of a February 2000 City Council meeting shows Miller asking city officials four times to buy his land. Another, earlier videotape confirmed Miller's position that the city had refused to let him develop the land and threatened "condemnation" of his property for public use. Although all early drafts of Monrovia's sales contract with Miller included the phrase "friendly condemnation", it was deleted when the final deal was made. Miller and his wife signed an amendment to the escrow instructions on August 1, 2002, saying, "condemnation deleted", or no longer in effect.

Miller took an exemption again in 2005 when he sold the 10 lots to the city of Fontana and again in 2006 when he sold a building to Fontana, claiming both were compulsory sales. The lots and building had been purchased in late 2004 with proceeds from the Monrovia sale. Such exemptions gave him another two years after each sale to reinvest the funds without paying capital gains taxes.

In each case, those involved in the purchases say eminent domain was neither used nor threatened. On January 31, 2007, the Los Angeles Times reported that Miller's transactions are being investigated by the FBI.

Miller declined to comment on the sales. The FBI also declined to comment. As of 2008, no investigation or legal action could be confirmed.

2005 profits from dealings with business partner and federal transportation bill

As a member of the House Transportation and Infrastructure Committee, Miller pushed for a provision in the 2005 transportation bill that allowed the city of Rialto to close its airport, the first time an act of Congress has ever shuttered an airport. It is a power the Federal Aviation Administration traditionally has had sole authority to exercise. The closing of the airport paved the way for Lewis Operating, a business partner and campaign contributor, to win a multimillion-dollar contract from the city to develop the airport land and build a planned community consisting of 2,500 homes, parks and 80 acres (320,000 m^{2}) of retail space on the former airport and adjacent land.

Miller also helped secure $1.28 million in that bill for street improvements in front of a planned housing and retail center, including a Target store that he co-owned with Lewis Operating.

Miller took out nearly $7.5 million in promissory notes in 2004 from Lewis Operating, which he used to purchase land from the company. In 2005, he sold some of that land to a part of the company, making a profit of between $1.1 million and $6 million, according to his financial disclosure report (which requires reporting a dollar range, not an exact dollar figure). The majority of the parcels that Miller bought are about two miles (3 km) from the airport.

House Rules explicitly state that before entering into loans from an entity other than a financial institution, members of Congress and staff must submit the terms of the loans for review and a determination from the ethics committee on whether the loan is acceptable under the gift rule. It is not clear if Miller complied with this requirement.

December 2006 allegations

In December 2006, the Los Angeles Times reported that Miller had used "congressional muscle" for "personal business matters". This included having congressional staff do Miller's personal errands, collecting nearly $25,000 a year in rent from his campaign committee, using the offices of his real estate development firm as his campaign office, and ordering an aide to find a way to get a city business-friendly council member on the National Park Board who was involved in a city purchase of Miller's property.

May 2010 allegations

In May 2010, the FOX affiliate MyFOXLA interviewed Miller over claims led by Citizens for Responsibility and Ethics in Washington (CREW) stating he "directed millions of dollars in government money to non-profits headed by one of his campaign contributor[s], developer Jeffrey Burum". Burum, his company, and his wife donated $26,350 to Miller's campaign for what CREW alleges is over a million dollars in congressional earmarks kicked back to Burum's non-profit Hope Through Housing Foundation.

=== Committee assignments ===
- Committee on Financial Services
  - Subcommittee on Insurance, Housing and Community Opportunity
  - Subcommittee on International Monetary Policy and Trade (Chair)
- Committee on Transportation and Infrastructure
  - Subcommittee on Highways and Transit
  - Subcommittee on Railroads, Pipelines, and Hazardous Materials
  - Subcommittee on Water Resources and Environment

=== Caucus membership ===
- Chairman of the Building a Better America Caucus
- Republican Study Committee
- Tea Party Caucus
- Congressional Cement Caucus

== Controversies ==
=== Accusation of sexual harassment ===
Rebecca Weir, a former staff member of Miller, claimed that he asked her to "twirl for him" after a meeting. According to Weir, "He said, ‘My God, you look amazing today. Just stunning.’ And he was kind of leering at me, and then he asked me to twirl,". Soon after the incident, Miller's chief of staff called Weir to offer an ad-hoc bonus as instructed by Miller.

== Personal life ==
Miller and his wife, Cathy, have three sons and one daughter.

=== Abduction of grandchildren ===
On November 19, 2007, three of Miller's grandsons, Brian (8) and twins Evan and Christian (6), did not show for a scheduled joint-custody visit with their grandparents, the Millers. The Millers accused the boys' mother, Jennifer Lopez DeJongh, of abducting the children. DeJongh was divorced from Miller's son, Brian Miller, and the two were in dispute over certain custodial rights regarding medical and educational decisions for the children. Brian had previously pled guilty in 2000 to charges of spousal and child abuse. In 2006, prosecutors allowed him to change his plea to not guilty and dismissed the case after he completed probation, a parenting class, and 224 hours of community service. In August 2011, DeJongh and the boys were located in Mexicali, Mexico. DeJongh was charged with three counts of child custody deprivation in Los Angeles County, but federal charges of flight to avoid prosecution were dropped following her extradition. The children were reunited with the Miller family. Congressman Miller commented that, "My wife and I are extremely relieved that after more than 3 1/2 years our grandchildren have been found unharmed and returned safely to the United States" and that he was "eternally grateful" to the Federal Bureau of Investigation, the Los Angeles County Sheriff's Department, the National Center for Missing and Exploited Children, Mexican authorities and "all those whose hard work and unwavering dedication made this possible".

== Electoral history ==
1998 United States House of Representatives elections in California
Party	Candidate	Votes	%
Republican	Gary Miller	68,310	53.2
Democratic	Eileen R. Ansari	52,264	40.7
Green	Cynthia Allaire	3,597	2.8
Libertarian	Kenneth E. Valentine	2,529	2.0
Natural Law	David F. Kramer	1,714	1.3
Total votes		128,414	100.0
Republican hold			

2000 United States House of Representatives elections in California
Party	Candidate	Votes	%
Republican	Gary Miller (Incumbent)	104,695	59.0
Democratic	Rodolfo G. Favila	66,361	37.4
Natural Law	David Kramer	6,607	3.6
Total votes		177,616	100.0
Republican hold			

2002 United States House of Representatives elections in California
Party	Candidate	Votes	%
Republican	Gary Miller (Incumbent)	98,476	67.8
Democratic	Richard Waldron	42,090	29.0
Libertarian	Donald Yee	4,680	3.2
Total votes		145,186	100.0
Republican hold			

2004 United States House of Representatives elections in California
Party	Candidate	Votes	%
Republican	Gary Miller (Incumbent)	167,632	68.2
Democratic	Lewis Myers	78,393	31.8
Total votes		246,025	100.0
Republican hold			

2006 United States House of Representatives elections in California
Party	Candidate	Votes	%
Republican	Gary Miller (Incumbent)	129,720	100.0
Republican hold			

2008 United States House of Representatives elections in California
Party	Candidate	Votes	%
Republican	Gary Miller (Incumbent)	158,404	60.2
Democratic	Ed Chau	104,909	39.8
Total votes		263,313	100.0
Republican hold			

2010 United States House of Representatives elections in California
Party	Candidate	Votes	%
Republican	Gary Miller (Incumbent)	127,161	62.3
Democratic	Michael Williamson	65,122	31.8
Libertarian	Mark Lambert	12,115	5.9
Total votes		204,398	100.0
Republican hold			

2012 United States House of Representatives elections in California
Party	Candidate	Votes	%
Republican	Gary Miller (Incumbent)	88,964	55.2
Republican	Robert Dutton	72,255	44.8
Total votes		161,219	100.0
Republican hold			

U.S. House of Representatives
Preceded by Jay Kim	Member of the U.S. House of Representatives from California's 41st congressional district 1999–2003	Succeeded by Jerry Lewis
Preceded by Joe Baca	Member of the U.S. House of Representatives from California's 42nd congressional district 2003–2013	Succeeded by Ken Calvert
Preceded by Xavier Becerra	Member of the U.S. House of Representatives from California's 31st congressional district 2013–2015	Succeeded by Pete Aguilar
U.S. order of precedence (ceremonial)
Preceded by George Radanovich as Former U.S. Representative	Order of precedence of the United States as Former U.S. Representative	Succeeded by Mike Honda as Former U.S. Representative
