= California's 60th State Assembly district =

American legislative district

Current assemblymember
Corey Jackson; D–Perris
- Population (2010) • Voting age • Citizen voting age: 470,287; 329,885; 243,511
- Demographics: 31.62% White; 5.53% Black; 52.52% Latino; 8.60% Asian; 0.61% Native American; 0.40% Hawaiian/Pacific Islander; 0.24% other; 0.49% remainder of multiracial
- Registered voters: 230,257
- Registration: 41.83% Democratic; 31.14% Republican; 21.46% No party preference

California's 60th State Assembly district is one of 80 California State Assembly districts. It is currently represented by Democrat Corey Jackson of Moreno Valley.

== District profile ==
The district is located in the northwestern corner of Riverside County, anchored by the city of Moreno Valley, stretching to south to Perris, southeast to San Jacinto, and northwest to part of the city of Riverside, including UC Riverside. The district was redrawn by the 2020 California Citizens Redistricting Commission.

Riverside County – 19.44%

- Moreno Valley
- Perris
- San Jacinto
- Hemet
- Mead Valley
- East Hemet
- Good Hope
- Riverside

== Other levels of government ==
The 60th Assembly District is completely contained within the 31st senatorial district, represented by Democrat Sabrina Cervantes.

In the United States House of Representatives, the 60th Assembly District is split between the California's 41st congressional district, represented by Republican Ken Calvert, and California's 42nd congressional district, represented by Democrat Robert Garcia.

== Election results from statewide races ==
Year	Office	Results
2020	President	Biden 52.7 – 43.2%
2018	Governor	Newsom 51.8 – 48.2%
2018	Senator	De León 53.0 – 47.0%
2016	President	Clinton 52.5 – 42.0%
2016	Senator	Harris 52.7 – 47.3%
2014	Governor	Kashkari 56.2 – 43.7%
2012	President	Obama 51.3 – 46.3%
2012	Senator	Feinstein 52.7 – 47.3%

== List of assembly members representing the district ==
Due to redistricting, the 60th district has been moved around different parts of the state. The current iteration resulted from the 2021 redistricting by the California Citizens Redistricting Commission.

Assembly members	Party	Years served	Counties represented	Notes
Uriah Sandifer Gregory	Democratic	January 5, 1885 – January 3, 1887	Amador	
Judson C. Brusie	Republican	January 3, 1887 – January 7, 1889	Amador	
Clovis T. LaGrave	Democratic	January 7, 1889 – January 5, 1891	Amador	
Edward A. Freeman	Republican	January 5, 1891 – January 2, 1893	Amador	
P. H. Mack	Democratic	January 2, 1893 – January 7, 1895	Alpine, Inyo, Mono	
Cyrus Coleman	Republican	January 7, 1895 – October 4, 1896	Alpine, Inyo, Mono	Died in office due to heart failure.
Vacant		October 4, 1896 – January 4, 1897	Alpine, Inyo, Mono	
Thomas A. Keables	Fusion	January 4, 1897 – January 2, 1899	Alpine, Inyo, Mono	
P. H. Mack	Democratic	January 2, 1899 – January 1, 1901	Alpine, Inyo, Mono	
Charles H. Miller	Democratic	January 1, 1901 – January 5, 1903	Alpine, Inyo, Mono	
J. O. Traber	Republican	January 5, 1903 – January 2, 1905	Fresno	
Wilber Fisk Chandler	Republican	January 2, 1905 – January 4, 1909	Fresno	
William R. Odom	Democratic	January 4, 1909 – January 2, 1911	Fresno	
Wilber Fisk Chandler	Republican	January 2, 1911 – January 6, 1913	Fresno	
Thomas G. Gabbert	Republican	January 6, 1913 – January 4, 1915	Ventura	
Roger G. Edwards	Republican	January 4, 1915 – January 8, 1917	Ventura	
Joseph Mayo Argabrite	Democratic	January 8, 1917 – January 3, 1921	Ventura	
George E. Hume	Republican	January 3, 1921 – January 8, 1923	Ventura	
Walter H. Duval	Republican	January 8, 1923 – January 7, 1929	Ventura	
Dan W. Emmett	Republican	January 7, 1929 – January 5, 1931	Ventura	
Willis M. Baum	Republican	January 5, 1931 – January 2, 1933	Los Angeles	
Walter J. Little	Republican	January 2, 1933 – March 29, 1934	Los Angeles	
Vacant		March 29, 1934 – January 7, 1935	Los Angeles	
Geoffrey F. Morgan	Republican	January 7, 1935 – January 2, 1939	Los Angeles	
Jesse Randolph "John" Kellems	Republican	January 2, 1939 – January 8, 1945	Los Angeles	
M. Philip Davis	Republican	January 8, 1945 – January 3, 1949	Los Angeles	
Harold K. Levering	Republican	January 3, 1949 – January 7, 1963	Los Angeles	
Robert S. Stevens	Republican	January 7, 1963 – January 2, 1967	Los Angeles	
Paul V. Priolo	Republican	January 2, 1967 – November 30, 1974	Los Angeles	
Joseph B. Montoya	Democratic	December 2, 1974 – November 30, 1978	Los Angeles	
Sally Tanner	Democratic	December 4, 1978 – November 30, 1992	Los Angeles	
Paul Horcher	Republican	December 7, 1992 – May 16, 1995	Los Angeles	Recalled from State Assembly.
Vacant		May 16, 1995 – May 18, 1995	Los Angeles	
Gary Miller	Republican	May 18, 1995 – November 30, 1998	Los Angeles	Sworn in after winning special election.
Bob Pacheco	Republican	December 7, 1998 – November 30, 2004	Los Angeles	
Bob Pacheco	Republican	December 7, 1998 – November 30, 2004	Los Angeles, Orange, San Bernardino	
Bob Huff	Republican	December 6, 2004 – November 30, 2008	Los Angeles, Orange, San Bernardino	
Curt Hagman	Republican	December 1, 2008 – November 30, 2012	Los Angeles, Orange, San Bernardino	
Eric Linder	Republican	December 3, 2012 – November 30, 2016	Riverside	
Sabrina Cervantes	Democratic	December 5, 2016 – November 30, 2022	Riverside	
Corey Jackson	Democratic	December 5, 2022 – present	Riverside	

== Election results (1990–present) ==
=== 2024 ===
2024 California State Assembly 60th district election
Primary election
Party	Candidate	Votes	%
Democratic	Corey Jackson (incumbent)	22,921	51.8
Republican	Ron Edwards	12,021	27.1
Republican	Hector Diaz Nava	9,336	21.1
Total votes		44,278	100.0
General election
Democratic	Corey Jackson (incumbent)	71,922	55.4
Republican	Ron Edwards	58,017	44.6
Total votes		129,939	100.0
Democratic hold			

=== 2022 ===
2022 California State Assembly 60th district election
Primary election
Party	Candidate	Votes	%
Republican	Hector Diaz-Nava	16,518	39.9
Democratic	Corey Jackson	11,158	27.0
Democratic	Esther Portillo	8,219	19.9
Democratic	Jasmin Rubio	5,471	13.2
Total votes		41,366	100.0
General election
Democratic	Corey Jackson	39,260	54.7
Republican	Hector Diaz-Nava	32,574	45.3
Total votes		71,834	100.0
Democratic hold			

=== 2020 ===
2020 California State Assembly 60th district election
Primary election
Party	Candidate	Votes	%
Democratic	Sabrina Cervantes (incumbent)	46,511	54.4
Republican	Chris Raahauge	38,968	45.6
Total votes		85,479	100.0
General election
Democratic	Sabrina Cervantes (incumbent)	110,133	56.4
Republican	Chris Raahauge	85,116	43.6
Total votes		195,249	100.0
Democratic hold			

=== 2018 ===
2018 California State Assembly 60th district election
Primary election
Party	Candidate	Votes	%
Republican	Bill Essayli	30,639	52.9
Democratic	Sabrina Cervantes (incumbent)	27,241	47.1
Total votes		57,880	100.0
General election
Democratic	Sabrina Cervantes (incumbent)	67,950	54.1
Republican	Bill Essayli	57,710	45.9
Total votes		125,660	100.0
Democratic hold			

=== 2016 ===
2016 California State Assembly 60th district election
Primary election
Party	Candidate	Votes	%
Republican	Eric Linder (incumbent)	30,048	45.6
Democratic	Sabrina Cervantes	27,346	41.5
Democratic	Ken Park	8,478	12.9
Total votes		65,872	100.0
General election
Democratic	Sabrina Cervantes	77,404	54.5
Republican	Eric Linder (incumbent)	64,710	45.5
Total votes		142,114	100.0
Democratic gain from Republican			

=== 2014 ===
2014 California State Assembly 60th district election
Primary election
Party	Candidate	Votes	%
Republican	Eric Linder (incumbent)	20,248	98.6
Democratic	Ken Park (write-in)	144	0.7
Democratic	Oliver Unaka (write-in)	118	0.6
Libertarian	John Farr (write-in)	34	0.2
Total votes		20,544	100.0
General election
Republican	Eric Linder (incumbent)	34,348	61.5
Democratic	Ken Park	21,508	38.5
Total votes		55,855	100.0
Republican hold			

=== 2012 ===
2012 California State Assembly 60th district election
Primary election
Party	Candidate	Votes	%
Democratic	José Luis Pérez	11,411	32.4
Republican	Eric Linder	10,000	28.4
Republican	Stan Skipworth	7,058	20.0
Republican	Greg Kraft	6,749	19.2
Total votes		35,218	100.0
General election
Republican	Eric Linder	60,638	51.8
Democratic	José Luis Pérez	56,405	48.2
Total votes		117,043	100.0
Republican hold			

=== 2010 ===
2010 California State Assembly 60th district election
Party	Candidate	Votes	%
Republican	Curt Hagman (incumbent)	83,354	65.3
Democratic	Gregg D. Fritchle	44,405	34.7
Total votes		127,759	100.0
Republican hold			

=== 2008 ===
2008 California State Assembly 60th district election
Party	Candidate	Votes	%
Republican	Curt Hagman	92,907	55.9
Democratic	Diane Singer	73,425	44.1
Total votes		166,332	100.0
Republican hold			

=== 2006 ===
2006 California State Assembly 60th district election
Party	Candidate	Votes	%
Republican	Bob Huff (incumbent)	74,721	70.0
Democratic	Van Tamom	32,090	30.0
Total votes		106,811	100.0
Republican hold			

=== 2004 ===
2004 California State Assembly 60th district election
Party	Candidate	Votes	%
Republican	Bob Huff	105,334	66.5
Democratic	Patrick John Martinez	52,969	33.5
Total votes		158,303	100.0
Republican hold			

=== 2002 ===
2002 California State Assembly 60th district election
Party	Candidate	Votes	%
Republican	Robert Pacheco (incumbent)	62,260	68.1
Democratic	Adrian Lincoln Martinez	27,964	31.9
Total votes		90,224	100.0
Republican hold			

=== 2000 ===
2000 California State Assembly 60th district election
Party	Candidate	Votes	%
Republican	Robert Pacheco (incumbent)	71,113	59.3
Democratic	Jeff A. Duhamel	43,992	36.7
Libertarian	Scott E. Young	4,802	4.0
Total votes		119,907	100.0
Republican hold			

=== 1998 ===
1998 California State Assembly 60th district election
Party	Candidate	Votes	%
Republican	Robert Pacheco	47,333	52.5
Democratic	Ben Wong	40,678	45.1
Libertarian	Leland Thomas Faegre	2,175	2.4
Total votes		90,186	100.0
Republican hold			

=== 1996 ===
1996 California State Assembly 60th district election
Party	Candidate	Votes	%
Republican	Gary Miller (incumbent)	56,462	52.7
Democratic	Susan Amaya	50,664	47.3
No party	Jeff Hays (write-in)	8	0.0
Total votes		107,134	100.0
Republican hold			

=== 1995 (recall) ===
1995 California State Assembly 60th district special recall election
Choice	Votes	%
For	35,860	61.63
Against	22,326	38.37
Total	58,186	100.00

1995 California State Assembly 60th district special recall election Successor of Paul Horcher if a majority vote in favor of recall
Party	Candidate	Votes	%
Republican	Gary Miller	19,389	39.2
Republican	Barbara Stone	15,792	32.0
Democratic	Andrew M. "Andy" Ramirez	10,567	21.4
Libertarian	Matt Piazza	1,286	2.6
Republican	Royal Meservy	1,224	2.5
Republican	Jim Hale	1,141	2.3
Total votes		49,399	100.0
Republican hold			

=== 1994 ===
1994 California State Assembly 60th district election
Party	Candidate	Votes	%
Republican	Paul Horcher (incumbent)	57,692	61.5
Democratic	Andrew M. "Andy" Ramirez	30,590	32.6
Libertarian	Michael L. Welte	5,519	5.9
Total votes		93,801	100.0
Republican hold			

=== 1992 ===
1992 California State Assembly 60th district election
Party	Candidate	Votes	%
Republican	Paul V. Horcher (incumbent)	67,397	55.7
Democratic	Stan Caress	44,284	36.6
American Independent	Robert Lewis	9,330	7.7
Total votes		121,011	100.0
Republican gain from Democratic			

=== 1990 ===
1990 California State Assembly 60th district election
Party	Candidate	Votes	%
Democratic	Sally Tanner (incumbent)	25,408	61.2
Republican	Ron Aguirre	16,127	38.8
Total votes		41,535	100.0
Democratic hold			

== See also ==
- California State Assembly
- California State Assembly districts
- Districts in California
