= Paul Horcher =

American politician

Paul V. Horcher

Member of the California State Assembly from the 60th district
- In office December 7, 1992 – May 16, 1995
- Preceded by: Sally Tanner
- Succeeded by: Gary Miller

Member of the California State Assembly from the 52nd district
- In office December 3, 1990 – November 30, 1992
- Preceded by: Frank Hill
- Succeeded by: Willard H. Murray Jr.

Member of the Diamond Bar City Council
- In office 1989–1990

Member of the Diamond Bar Municipal Advisory Council
- In office 1982–1989

Personal details
- Born: Paul Virgil Horcher; August 31, 1951 (age 75) Texas, U.S.
- Party: Independent (since 1994) Republican (until 1994)
- Spouse: Van Le (m. 1982)
- Children: Kimberley Vanessa; Pauline Vonne
- Education: California State Polytechnic University, Pomona
- Occupation: Attorney

Paul V. Horcher (born August 31, 1951) is an American former politician from California and a former member of the Republican Party.

== Early career ==
A graduate of California State Polytechnic University, Pomona, Horcher practiced law before joining the Diamond Bar Municipal Advisory Council in 1982. In 1989 he co-founded the city of Diamond Bar and was elected to its city council.

== Legislative Races ==
In 1990 Horcher was elected to the California State Assembly from the 52nd district, which covered eastern Los Angeles County including the cities of West Covina, Whittier and Horcher's hometown of Diamond Bar. He easily won reelection in the renumbered 60th district in 1992.

In late 1994 Horcher also ran, unsuccessfully this time, in a special election for the California State Senate. The 29th district had been vacated by the resignation of GOP incumbent Frank Hill, who had been convicted of corruption. Horcher came in third behind GOP Assemblyman Dick Mountjoy and Diamond Bar city councilman Gary Miller, with the mud between Mountjoy and Miller being especially nasty. Horcher did, however, have an easy reelection to the assembly later that November.

== Assembly career ==
Although a Republican, Horcher carved a relatively moderate voting record while in the legislature. His support on many key votes endeared him to Democratic Speaker Willie Brown but made him a pariah among his fellow Republicans. After the 1994 elections, Republicans won control of the California State Assembly by a single seat. Horcher, still fuming from his own party's rough treatment of him, declared himself an independent on December 5, 1994 and voted to keep Democrat Brown in power. Furious Republicans qualified a recall election against Horcher, which voters supported May 16, 1995. He was replaced by Diamond Bar City Councilman, Gary Miller, who turned out to be a more loyal Republican.

== Post Legislature ==
After leaving the Assembly, Horcher held various position in the administration of Willie Brown, who by then had been elected mayor of San Francisco. He served under Brown from 1996 until 2004, when Brown's term ended. Following his service to San Francisco, he returned to a real estate and administrative law practice. His niche law practice in San Francisco includes representing massage parlors who have been accused of violating San Francisco Health Code.

== Electoral history ==
Member, California State Assembly: 1991-1995
Year	Office	Democrat	Votes	Pct	Republican	Votes	Pct
1990	California State Assembly; District 52	Gary Neeley	31,583	41.1%	Paul Horcher	45,264	58.9%
1992	California State Assembly; District 60	Stan Caress	44,284	36.6%	Paul Horcher	67,397	55.7%
1994	California State Senate; District 26 (special election)	Sandy Hester	64,007	33%	Paul Horcher 18% Gary Miller 20% Richard Mountjoy 45%	116,562	55.7%
1994	California State Assembly; District 60	Andy Ramirez	30,590	32.6%	Paul Horcher	94,722	61.5%

Political offices
Preceded by Sally Tanner	California State Assembly, 60th District; 1990-1995	Succeeded by Gary Miller
