= Bob Pacheco =

American politician

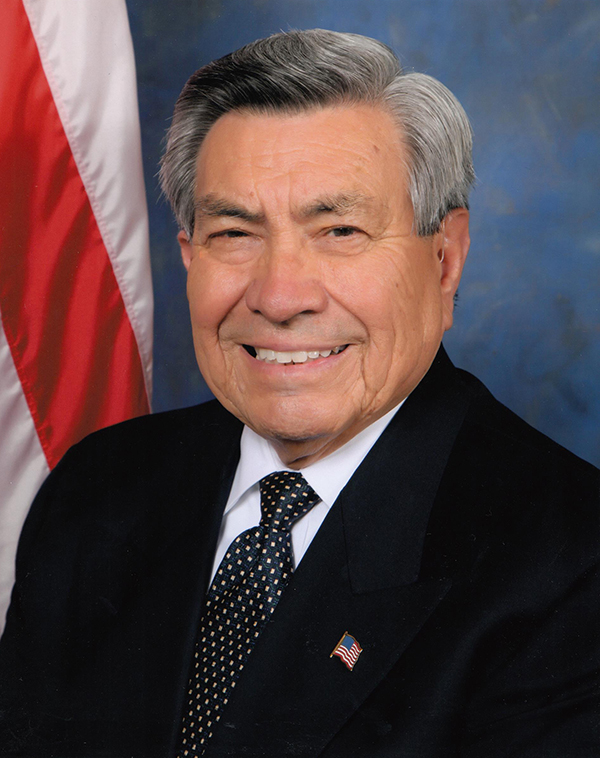

Member of the Walnut City Council
- Incumbent
- Assumed office July 2013
- Preceded by: Thomas King
- In office 1996–1998

Member of the United States Naval Academy Board of Visitors
- In office 2006–2007
- Appointed by: George W. Bush

Member of the Occupational Safety & Health Standards Board, California Department of Industrial Relations
- In office 2005–2010
- Appointed by: Arnold Schwarzenegger

Member of the California State Assembly from the 60th district
- In office December 7, 1998 - November 30, 2004
- Preceded by: Gary Miller
- Succeeded by: Bob Huff

Personal details
- Born: June 10, 1934 (age 92) Mesilla Park, New Mexico, U.S.
- Party: Republican
- Spouse: Gayle
- Children: 5
- Education: East Los Angeles College (AA); California State University, Los Angeles (BBA); Western State College of Law (JD)

Robert Pacheco (born June 10, 1934 in Mesilla Park, New Mexico) is an American attorney and politician who represented California's 60th State Assembly district from 1998 to 2004. He served on the United States Naval Academy Board of Visitors from 2006 to 2007. He has served as a member of the Walnut City Council in Walnut, California since 2013.

== Education ==
Pacheco received his Associate of Arts degree from East Los Angeles College and a Bachelor of Arts degree in Business Administration from California State University, Los Angeles. He earned his Juris Doctor degree from Western State University College of Law in Fullerton, California. Pacheco was admitted to the California State Bar in 1974.

== Career ==
Before becoming a lawyer, he served as an AVP commercial lending officer for a California bank. He owns his own law firm called Pacheco & Pacheco which is based in Walnut, California. Him and his wife currently own, and successfully operate, a multi-million dollar manufacturing company in Walnut.

During the 1990s he served on the Walnut Planning Commission. From 1996 to 1998 he served on the Walnut City Council in Walnut, California. He was appointed to the council again in July 2013 replacing Thomas King who retired.

Pacheco succeeded Gary Miller after Miller was elected to Congress. Pacheco left office in 2004 due to term limits.

In April 2005, Governor Arnold Schwarzenegger appointed Pacheco to a spot on the California Division of Occupational Safety and Health Board of Occupational Safety & Health Standards which he served on until 2010. In 2006 Pacheco was appointed by President George W. Bush to the United States Naval Academy Board of Visitors which served until 2007.

California Assembly
Preceded by Gary Miller	California State Assemblyman, 60th District; December 7, 1998 - November 30, 2004	Succeeded by Bob Huff
