= Sabrina Cervantes =

American politician

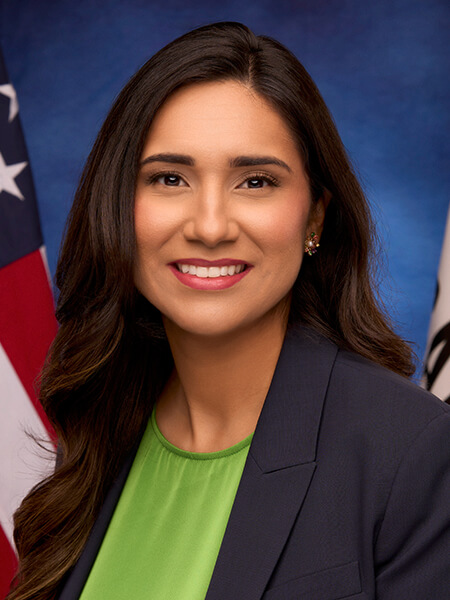
- Official portrait, 2024

Member of the California Senate from the 31st district
- Incumbent
- Assumed office December 2, 2024
- Preceded by: Richard Roth

Member of the California State Assembly
- In office December 5, 2016 – November 30, 2024
- Preceded by: Eric Linder
- Succeeded by: Leticia Castillo
- Constituency: 60th district (2016–2022); 58th district (2022–2024)

Personal details
- Born: October 24, 1987 (age 39) Riverside, California, U.S.
- Party: Democratic
- Spouse: Courtney Downs (m. 2018)
- Children: 3
- Relatives: Clarissa Cervantes (sister)
- Education: University of California, Riverside (BA)

Sabrina Cervantes (born October 24, 1987) is an American politician who has served in the California State Senate since 2024, representing the 31st Senate District in the Inland Empire in Southern California. A member of the Democratic Party, she previously served as a member of the California State Assembly, representing the 58th Assembly District from 2022 to 2024 and the 60th Assembly District from 2016 to 2022, both of which encompassed northwestern Riverside County.

Cervantes was first elected to the State Assembly in November 2016 to represent the 60th Assembly District after defeating incumbent Republican Eric Linder. In 2019, she became the first member of the California State Legislature to give birth to triplets while serving in office. She is the author of the landmark California Voting Rights Act of 2026.

== Early life and education ==
Cervantes was born and raised in Riverside County, California. Her father, Greg, had previously served as mayor of Coachella and her sister, Clarissa, currently serves on the Riverside City Council. She earned a Bachelor of Arts in political science with a minor in public policy from the University of California, Riverside.

== Career ==
Before being elected to the State Legislature, Cervantes served as a district director for a member of the California State Assembly, and as director of the California Voter Project, a statewide nonprofit dedicated to increasing voter registration.

She also worked in the private sector alongside various community organizations to enhance the local economy, broaden access to quality education, and improve access to governmental services. She is currently a member of the Human Rights Campaign, The PICK Group of Young Professionals, and serves on the Advisory Board for the University of California, Riverside School of Public Policy. She has previously served on the board of directors for the UCR Chicano Latino Alumni Association, and non-profit organizations TruEvolution and Women Wonder Writers.

From 2022 to 2024, Cervantes served as Chair of the California Latino Legislative Caucus, and currently serves as Vice Chair of the California Legislative LGBTQ Caucus. She is also a member of the California Legislative Women's Caucus.

Cervantes served as Chair of the Senate Committee on Elections and Constitutional Amendments from December 2024 to February 2026, and currently serves as Chair of the Senate Appropriations Committee.

== Legal issues ==
In May 2025, the Sacramento Police Department issued Cervantes a citation on suspicion of driving under the influence after her car was t-boned by another vehicle, but charges were not pursued by the District Attorney after lab tests showed no measurable presence of either drugs or alcohol. On September 8, 2025, Cervantes filed a claim against the Sacramento Police Department, accusing the department of retaliation against her for sponsoring a bill that the department did not support, and for being LGBTQ and a Latina. According to Cervantes, the white woman who hit her was treated differently.

== Electoral history ==
=== California State Assembly ===
2016 California State Assembly 60th district election
Primary election
Party	Candidate	Votes	%
Republican	Eric Linder (incumbent)	30,048	45.6
Democratic	Sabrina Cervantes	27,346	41.5
Democratic	Ken Park	8,478	12.9
Total votes		65,872	100.0
General election
Democratic	Sabrina Cervantes	77,404	54.5
Republican	Eric Linder (incumbent)	64,710	45.5
Total votes		142,114	100.0
Democratic gain from Republican			

2018 California State Assembly 60th district election
Primary election
Party	Candidate	Votes	%
Republican	Bill Essayli	30,639	52.9
Democratic	Sabrina Cervantes (incumbent)	27,241	47.1
Total votes		57,880	100.0
General election
Democratic	Sabrina Cervantes (incumbent)	67,950	54.1
Republican	Bill Essayli	57,710	45.9
Total votes		125,660	100.0
Democratic hold			

2020 California State Assembly 60th district election
Primary election
Party	Candidate	Votes	%
Democratic	Sabrina Cervantes (incumbent)	46,511	54.4
Republican	Chris Raahauge	38,968	45.6
Total votes		85,479	100.0
General election
Democratic	Sabrina Cervantes (incumbent)	110,133	56.4
Republican	Chris Raahauge	85,116	43.6
Total votes		195,249	100.0
Democratic hold			

2022 California State Assembly 58th district election
Primary election
Party	Candidate	Votes	%
Democratic	Sabrina Cervantes (incumbent)	28,568	54.1
Republican	Bernard William Murphy	13,449	25.5
Republican	Leticia Castillo	10,756	20.4
Total votes		52,773	100.0
General election
Democratic	Sabrina Cervantes (incumbent)	50,259	53.6
Republican	Bernard William Murphy	43,464	46.4
Total votes		93,723	100.0
Democratic hold			

=== California State Senate ===
2024 California State Senate 31st district election
Primary election
Party	Candidate	Votes	%
Republican	Cynthia Navarro	46,633	45.9
Democratic	Sabrina Cervantes	40,033	39.4
Democratic	Angelo Farooq	15,026	14.8
Total votes		101,692	100.0
General election
Democratic	Sabrina Cervantes	153,282	54.3
Republican	Cynthia Navarro	128,994	45.7
Total votes		282,276	100.0
Democratic hold			

== Personal life ==
She gave birth to triplets in 2019, the first to do so as a sitting member of the California State Legislature.
