= Bob Huff =

American politician

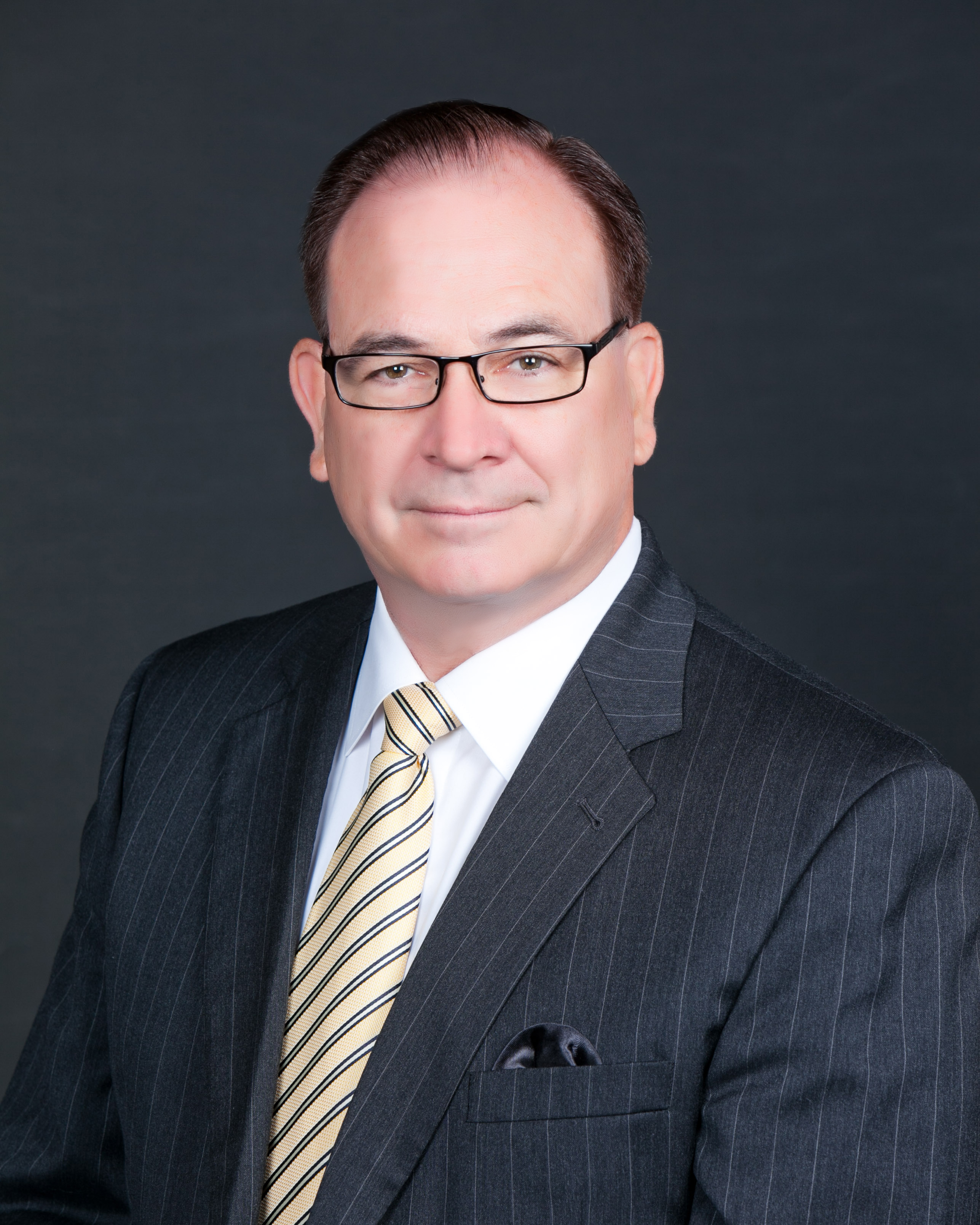
- Official portrait, 2012

Minority Leader of the California Senate
- In office January 5, 2012 – August 27, 2015
- Preceded by: Bob Dutton
- Succeeded by: Jean Fuller

California State Senate Republican Caucus Chair
- In office August 1, 2009 – January 5, 2012
- Preceded by: George Runner
- Succeeded by: Tom Harman

Member of the California State Senate from the 29th district
- In office December 1, 2008 – November 30, 2016
- Preceded by: Bob Margett
- Succeeded by: Josh Newman

California State Assembly Republican Caucus Chair
- In office December 8, 2006 – November 30, 2008
- Preceded by: Greg Aghazarian
- Succeeded by: Cameron Smyth

Member of the California State Assembly from the 60th district
- In office December 6, 2004 – November 30, 2008
- Preceded by: Bob Pacheco
- Succeeded by: Curt Hagman

Personal details
- Born: September 9, 1953 (age 73) Calexico, California, U.S.
- Party: Republican
- Spouse: Mei Mei
- Children: 4
- Education: Westmont College
- Occupation: Agriculture businessman
- Website: Bob Huff for Congress

Robert S. Huff (born September 9, 1953) is an American businessman and politician who was the California State Senate minority leader and Senate Republican leader from January 5, 2012, until August 27, 2015. He represented the Senate's 29th District, which includes portions of Los Angeles, Orange, and San Bernardino counties.

== Early life ==
Born on September 9, 1953, in Calexico, California, Huff grew up on his family's farm near El Centro. He has a bachelor's degree in psychology from Westmont College, and his business background is in grain handling and commodity wholesaling.

== Political career ==
=== Diamond Bar ===
Huff served on the Diamond Bar City Council, and was Mayor of the city in 1997 and 2001. He was also involved in local transportation issues, serving on the Four Corners Transportation Policy Group, Foothill Transit, and the Alameda Corridor East Construction Authority.

=== State Assembly ===
Huff was elected to the California State Assembly in 2004, defeating Gail Pacheco, the wife of term-limited Bob Pacheco. The election was considered an upset. Reelected in 2006, he was a member of the California State Assembly until 2008.

=== State Senate ===
Huff was elected to the California State Senate for the 29th district in 2008, succeeding the term-limited Bob Margett. In 2012, he was elected by the Republican Caucus to succeed the term-limited Bob Dutton as Senate Republican Leader. After the 2012 California State Senate elections, Huff was re-elected Senate Republican Leader. Term limits prevented him from running for re-election in 2016.

Huff was a member of the Senate Education Committee and authored legislation affecting K-12 education. He is an advocate of charter schools, school choice, and standardized testing. He supported SB 161, which allows trained volunteers to administer emergency medication to students with epilepsy who suffer a seizure at school. Huff introduced Senate Bill 1295, a measure to approve the placement of commercial advertisements on the exterior of school-buses. This bill was rejected by the Senate Education Committee but was given an option to be re-introduced at a later time. He introduced Senate Bill 1116 with Leland Yee (D-San Francisco), which defined and regulated "heritage schools", private after-school programs that teach foreign language and culture and required them to register with the California Department of Education instead of being licensed as child day care centers by the California Department of Social Services (DSS) Huff opposed a plan that would have replaced the current testing system with new tests based on the Common Core learning goals. Because test scores would be unavailable during the new test's two-year trial period, the U.S. Department of Education threatened to impose financial penalties on the state. The alternative supported by Huff was to require the use of both the old and the new test during that period. The state Senate approved the bill.

Huff cast a deciding vote in 2009 on a Senate rule waiver that allowed a measure on environmental exemptions favorable to one of Huff's donors, Majestic Realty. This vote led to criticism, as Majestic was also a client of his wife's consulting business. In 2011, Huff opposed Governor Jerry Brown’s plan to abolish California's redevelopment agencies.

In a state government that as of 2012 is controlled by Democrats with super majorities in both houses, Huff has a reputation as a moderate Republican. The Los Angeles Times opined that "Senate Republican leader Bob Huff of Diamond Bar was more pragmatic, given his party's weakened political position in Sacramento. Brown 'is the most conservative of the three leading Democrats in Sacramento,' Huff said." Huff has worked with Brown on issues such as California's prison crisis.

==== Committee memberships ====
Huff served on the Senate Education Committee and was the Vice Chair of the Senate Budget Committee. He also served as a member of the Joint Committee on Senate Rules, the Select Committees of Asian Pacific Islander Affairs, California Job Creation and Retention, California's Horse Racing Industry, Earthquake and Disaster Preparedness, Response and Recovery and High-Speed Rail committees.

Huff's sub-committee assignments included: Education: Sustainable School Facilities and Education: Policy Research.

=== 2016 Los Angeles County Board of Supervisors elections ===
In 2016 Huff ran for the Los Angeles County Board of Supervisors to represent the fifth district. In the election held June 7, Huff finished in third place in a field of 8 candidates, and did not make the runoff.

=== 2018 congressional election ===
In 2018 Huff ran for the United States House of Representatives to represent California's 39th congressional district. In the election held June 5, Huff finished in sixth place in a field of 17 candidates, and did not make the runoff.

== Positions and affiliations ==
On education, Huff received an 83% rating from the California State University system in 2011. He received an 11% rating in 2012 from the California School Employees Association. On business and labor issues, in 2012 he was rated 100% by the California Chamber of Commerce and 12% by the California Labor Federation, AFL-CIO. He received a 100% rating from the California Pro-Life Council in 2012 and a 20% rating from Planned Parenthood Affiliates of California in 2013. He received a 92% rating from the National Rifle Association of America in 2012.

In addition, he has received the following ratings:

Interest group	Rating	Year
American Cancer Society, California Division	53%	2012
American Conservative Union	91%	2012
California Communities United Institute	42%	2011
California Farm Bureau Federation	100%	2007
California League of Conservation Voters	5%	2012
California Park and Recreation Society	75%	2011–12
California National Organization for Women	8%	2009
California's Political Action Committee for Animals	0%	2011
California Taxpayers Association	100%	2012
Children's Advocacy Institute	58%	2011
Congress of California Seniors	37%	2012
Consumer Federation of California	13%	2012
Drug Policy Forum of California (DPFCA)	0%	2012
Republican Liberty Caucus of California	67%	2011

In 2012, Huff raised $1,169,601 in campaign contributions. His largest donors came from the insurance, health professionals, and real estate sectors. The California Association of Realtors, the California Chamber of Commerce, the California Medical Association, the California Building Industry Association, and the California Dental Association were his largest contributors.

== Recognition ==
Huff was recognized as 2011 Legislator of the Year by the League of California Cities for "efforts to protect local redevelopment agencies". He was also recognized by the American Council of Engineering Companies, California, and as the 2011 Job Champion by the Anaheim Chamber of Commerce. The California Epilepsy Foundation named three fellowships in honor of Huff at UCLA, USC and Children's Hospital Los Angeles for his work on behalf of students with epilepsy. He was awarded the 2005 Local Distinguished Service Award in Transportation from the American Public Transit Association and the Outstanding Community Leader of 2005 by the Old Baldy Council of the Boy Scouts of America.

== Personal life ==
Huff and his wife, Mei Mei, reside in Diamond Bar, California. As of 2013, they have four children and six grandchildren.
