= Curt Hagman =

American politician

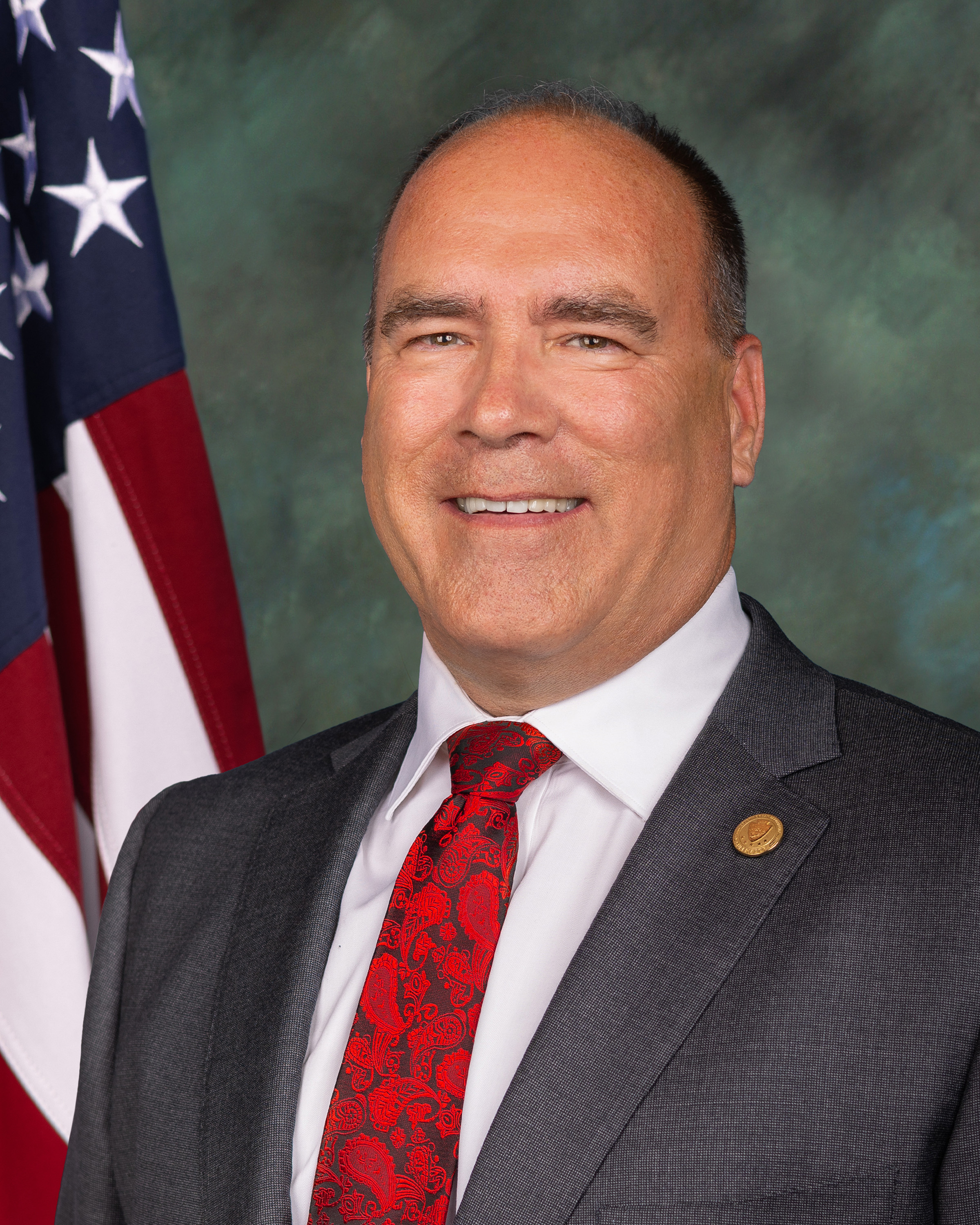
- Official portrait, 2023

Chair of the San Bernardino County Board of Supervisors
- Incumbent
- Assumed office January 29, 2019
- Preceded by: Robert A. Lovingood

Vice Chair of the San Bernardino County Board of Supervisors
- In office January 24, 2017 – January 29, 2019
- Preceded by: Robert A. Lovingood
- Succeeded by: Josie Gonzales

Member of the San Bernardino County Board of Supervisors from the 4th district
- Incumbent
- Assumed office December 2, 2014
- Preceded by: Gary C. Ovitt

Member of the California State Assembly
- In office December 1, 2008 – November 30, 2014
- Preceded by: Bob Huff
- Succeeded by: Ling Ling Chang
- Constituency: 60th district (2008–2012); 55th district (2012–2014)

Mayor of Chino Hills
- In office December 1, 2007 – December 1, 2008
- Preceded by: Gwenn Norton-Perry
- Succeeded by: Peter J. Rogers

Member of the Chino Hills City Council
- In office December 6, 2004 – December 1, 2008
- Succeeded by: Art Bennett

Personal details
- Born: Curt Christopher Hagman; January 2, 1965 (age 61)
- Party: Republican
- Spouse: Rossana Hagman
- Children: 2
- Education: UCLA

Curt Hagman (born January 2, 1965) is an American public servant representing the Fourth District in San Bernardino County California since his election to the Board of Supervisors in 2014. The Fourth District encompasses the cities of Chino Hills, Chino, Ontario, Montclair and Upland. Hagman was elected Chairman of the Board of Supervisors for two consecutive terms in recognition of his leadership during the COVID-19 pandemic.

Hagman began his public service as a volunteer and served as a Chino Hills Parks & Recreation Commissioner. He later represented Chino Hills as a Council member and Mayor, served on the San Bernardino County Workforce Investment Board, and served six years in the California Legislature as a member of the State Assembly representing 55th district.

== Education ==
Hagman earned a Bachelor of Arts degree from UCLA. Hagman was a member of Phi Gamma Delta. He was also in the Naval Reserve Officers Training Corps.

== Career ==
In 2004, Hagman served on the Chino Hills City Council, until 2008 when he became the Mayor of Chino Hills, California.

Hagman was elected to the 55th district state assembly in 2008, winning 55.9% of the vote. He was re-elected in November 2010 with 65.3% of the vote.

In 2014, Hagman won the election for the San Bernardino County Board of Supervisors. He defeated U.S. Representative Gloria Negrete McLeod. He won re-election in 2022, easily defeating Democratic state senator Connie Leyva.

== Personal life ==
Hagman's wife is Rossana Hagman. They live in Chino Hills.

Hagman's residence and office were raided by the FBI on July 28, 2026.
