= Caucuses of the United States Congress =

A congressional caucus is a group of members of the United States Congress that meets to pursue common legislative objectives. Formally, caucuses are formed as Congressional Member Organizations (CMOs) through the United States House of Representatives and governed under the rules of that chamber. Caucuses are informal in the Senate, and unlike their House counterparts, Senate groups receive neither official recognition nor funding from the chamber. In addition to the term caucus, they are sometimes called coalitions, study groups, task forces, or working groups. Caucuses typically have bipartisan membership and have co-chairs from each party. Chairs are listed below the name of each caucus.

This is a list of congressional CMOs of the United States Congress, as listed by the House Administration Committee as of August 5, 2026. This article also contains a list of sponsoring Members for Congressional Staff Organizations (CSOs) as of March 14, 2025.

== Congressional Member Organizations (CMOs) ==
Contents A • B • C • D • E • F • G • H • I • L • M • N • P • Q • R • S • T • U • V • W • Y

A
CMO	Chair(s)	Ref(s)
Advancing Humanity in Space Congressional Caucus	Don Bacon (R)	
Advancing Humanity in Space Congressional Caucus	Glenn Ivey (D)	
Advancing Humanity in Space Congressional Caucus	Gabe Evans (R)	
Advancing Humanity in Space Congressional Caucus	George Whitesides (D)	
Air Force Caucus	Michael Turner (R)	
Air Force Caucus	John Garamendi (D)	
Air Force Caucus	Kathy Castor (D)	
Air Force Caucus	Blake Moore (R)	
American Canadian Economy and Security Caucus	Mark Amodei (R)	
American Canadian Economy and Security Caucus	Lizzie Fletcher (D)	
American Energy Dominance Caucus	Chuck Fleischmann (R)	
American Energy Dominance Caucus	Marc Veasey (D)	
American Sikh Congressional Caucus	David Valadao (R)	
American Sikh Congressional Caucus	Mary Gay Scanlon (D)	
Americans Abroad Caucus	Dina Titus (D)	
Assisting Caregivers Today (ACT) Caucus	Debbie Dingell (D)	
Assisting Caregivers Today (ACT) Caucus	Jen Kiggans (R)	
B
CMO	Chair(s)	
Baltic Caucus	Don Bacon (R)	
Baltic Caucus	Salud Carbajal (D)	
Bicycle Caucus	Mike Thompson (D)	
Bicycle Caucus	Vern Buchanan (R)	
Bicycle Caucus	Ayanna Pressley (D)	
Bicycle Caucus	Michael McCaul (R)	
BIOTech Caucus	Chrissy Houlahan (D)	
BIOTech Caucus	Stephanie Bice (R)	
Bipartisan Building Trades Caucus	Donald Norcross (D)	
Bipartisan Building Trades Caucus	Brian Fitzpatrick (R)	
Bipartisan Congressional Caucus on Vietnam
Bipartisan Congressional Caucus on Vietnam	Zoe Lofgren (D)	
Bipartisan Congressional Caucus on Vietnam	Lou Correa (D)	
Bipartisan Congressional Caucus on Vietnam	Chris Smith (R)	
Bipartisan Congressional Caucus on Vietnam	Derek Tran (D)	
Bipartisan Congressional PCOS Caucus
Bipartisan Congressional PCOS Caucus	Brian Fitzpatrick (R)	
Bipartisan Congressional PCOS Caucus	Debbie Wasserman Schultz (D)	
Bipartisan Congressional PCOS Caucus	Don Bacon (R)	
Bipartisan Congressional PCOS Caucus	Jan Schakowsky (D)	
Bipartisan Congressional PCOS Caucus	Vacant	
Bipartisan Congressional Psychedelics Advancing Therapies Caucus
Bipartisan Congressional Psychedelics Advancing Therapies Caucus	Lou Correa (D)	
Bipartisan Congressional Psychedelics Advancing Therapies Caucus	Jack Bergman (R)	
Bipartisan Disabilities Caucus
Bipartisan Disabilities Caucus	Brian Fitzpatrick (R)	
Bipartisan Disabilities Caucus	Debbie Dingell (D)	
Bipartisan Flood Resilience Caucus
Bipartisan Flood Resilience Caucus	Lizzie Fletcher (D)	
Bipartisan Flood Resilience Caucus	Randy Weber (R)	
Bipartisan Flood Resilience Caucus	Troy Carter (D)	
Bipartisan Flood Resilience Caucus	Mike Ezell (R)	
Bipartisan Maternity Care Caucus
Bipartisan Maternity Care Caucus	Jen Kiggans (R)	
Bipartisan Maternity Care Caucus	Bonnie Watson Coleman (D)	
Bipartisan Maternity Care Caucus	Robin Kelly (D)	
Bipartisan Mental Health and Substance Use Disorder Task Force
Bipartisan Mental Health and Substance Use Disorder Task Force	Brian Fitzpatrick (R)	
Bipartisan Mental Health and Substance Use Disorder Task Force	Lisa McClain (R)	
Bipartisan Mental Health and Substance Use Disorder Task Force	Lori Trahan (D)	
Bipartisan Mental Health and Substance Use Disorder Task Force	Brittany Pettersen (D)	
Bipartisan Ski and Snowboard Caucus
Bipartisan Ski and Snowboard Caucus	Joe Neguse (D)	
Bipartisan Ski and Snowboard Caucus	Blake Moore (R)	
Bipartisan Ski and Snowboard Caucus	Chris Pappas (D)	
Bipartisan Ski and Snowboard Caucus	Kevin Kiley (I)	
Bipartisan Ski and Snowboard Caucus	Maggie Goodlander (D)	
Bipartisan Ski and Snowboard Caucus	Jack Bergman (R)	
Bipartisan Wildfire Caucus
Bipartisan Wildfire Caucus	Joe Neguse (D)	
Bipartisan Wildfire Caucus	Celeste Maloy (R)	
Bipartisan Women's Caucus	Monica De La Cruz (R)	
Bipartisan Women's Caucus	Emilia Sykes (D)	
Bipartisan Working Group to End Domestic Violence Caucus
Bipartisan Working Group to End Domestic Violence Caucus	Debbie Dingell (D)	
Blue Collar Caucus	Brendan Boyle (D)	
Blue Collar Caucus	Marc Veasey (D)	
Build America Caucus
Build America Caucus	Josh Harder (D)	
Bureau of Prisons (BOP) Reform Caucus
Bureau of Prisons (BOP) Reform Caucus	Jeff Van Drew (R)	
C
CMO	Chair(s)	
California Aerospace Caucus
California Aerospace Caucus	Ken Calvert (R)	
California Aerospace Caucus	Ted Lieu (D)	
California Coastal Caucus
California Coastal Caucus	Julia Brownley (D)	
California Public Higher Education Caucus
California Public Higher Education Caucus	Ami Bera (D)	
California Public Higher Education Caucus	Jay Obernolte (R)	
Caucus on Black-Jewish Relations
Caucus on Black-Jewish Relations	Debbie Wasserman Schultz (D)	
Caucus on Black-Jewish Relations	Nikema Williams (D)	
Caucus on House Defense Communities	Joe Wilson (R)	
Caucus on House Defense Communities	Jason Crow (D)	
Chesapeake Bay Watershed Task Force
Chesapeake Bay Watershed Task Force	Bobby Scott (D)	
Chesapeake Bay Watershed Task Force	Rob Wittman (R)	
Chesapeake Bay Watershed Task Force	Andy Harris (R)	
Chesapeake Bay Watershed Task Force	Sarah Elfreth (D)	
Climate Solutions Caucus	Andrew Garbarino (R)	
Climate Solutions Caucus	Scott Peters (D)	
Combatting Human Trafficking Congressional Caucus
Combatting Human Trafficking Congressional Caucus	David Valadao (R)	
Combatting Human Trafficking Congressional Caucus	Laurel Lee (R)	
Combatting Human Trafficking Congressional Caucus	Troy Carter (D)	
Combatting Human Trafficking Congressional Caucus	Lucy McBath (D)	
Commission on the Social Status of Black Men and Boys Caucus
Commission on the Social Status of Black Men and Boys Caucus	Frederica Wilson (D)	
Compost Caucus	Tim Burchett (R)	
Compost Caucus	Julia Brownley (D)	
Congressional 21st Amendment Caucus
Congressional 21st Amendment Caucus	Stephanie Bice (R)	
Congressional 21st Amendment Caucus	Susie Lee (D)	
Congressional 5G and Beyond Caucus
Congressional 5G and Beyond Caucus	Tim Walberg (R)	
Congressional 5G and Beyond Caucus	Debbie Dingell (D)	
Congressional 5G and Beyond Caucus	Jay Obernolte (R)	
Congressional 5G and Beyond Caucus	Jennifer McClellan (D)	
Congressional Access to Legal Aid Caucus
Congressional Access to Legal Aid Caucus	Brian Fitzpatrick (R)	
Congressional Access to Legal Aid Caucus	Mary Gay Scanlon (D)	
Congressional Addiction, Treatment, and Recovery Caucus	Paul Tonko (D)	
Congressional Addiction, Treatment, and Recovery Caucus	David Joyce (R)	
Congressional Addiction, Treatment, and Recovery Caucus	Jen Kiggans (R)	
Congressional Addiction, Treatment, and Recovery Caucus	Madeleine Dean (D)	
Congressional Advanced Air Mobility Caucus
Congressional Advanced Air Mobility Caucus	Jay Obernolte (R)	
Congressional Advanced Air Mobility Caucus	Jimmy Panetta (D)	
Congressional Afghan Caucus	Joe Wilson (R)	
Congressional Afghan Caucus	Jason Crow (D)	
Congressional Aggregates Caucus	Nick Langworthy (R)	
Congressional Aggregates Caucus	Salud Carbajal (D)	
Congressional Agriculture Trade Caucus
Congressional Agriculture Trade Caucus	Adrian Smith (R)	
Congressional Agriculture Trade Caucus	Jim Costa (D)	
Congressional Agriculture Trade Caucus	Dusty Johnson (R)	
Congressional Agriculture Trade Caucus	Jimmy Panetta (D)	
Congressional Agritourism Caucus
Congressional Agritourism Caucus	Suhas Subramanyam (D)	
Congressional Agritourism Caucus	David Rouzer (R)	
Congressional Air Medical Caucus
Congressional Air Medical Caucus	Ryan Zinke (R)	
Congressional Air Medical Caucus	Jill Tokuda (D)	
Congressional Albanian Issues Caucus	Ritchie Torres (D)	
Congressional Albanian Issues Caucus	Robert Aderholt (R)	
Congressional Albanian Issues Caucus	Jim Himes (D)	
Congressional Albanian Issues Caucus	Lisa McClain (R)	
Congressional Algae Caucus	Scott Peters (D)	
Congressional Algae Caucus	Randy Weber (R)	
Congressional ALS Caucus	Brian Fitzpatrick (R)	
Congressional ALS Caucus	Jason Crow (D)	
Congressional ALS Caucus	Ken Calvert (R)	
Congressional ALS Caucus	Terri Sewell (D)	
Congressional America First Caucus	Anna Paulina Luna (R)	
Congressional America250 Caucus	Bonnie Watson Coleman (D)	
Congressional America250 Caucus	Dwight Evans (D)	
Congressional America250 Caucus	Robert Aderholt (R)	
Congressional America250 Caucus	María Elvira Salazar (R)	
Congressional America250 Caucus	Sen. Jeanne Shaheen (D)	
Congressional America250 Caucus	Sen. Shelley Moore Capito (R)	
Congressional America250 Caucus	Sen. Alex Padilla (D)	
Congressional America250 Caucus	Sen. Lisa Murkowski (R)	
Congressional American-Made Medicines Caucus	Buddy Carter (R)	
Congressional American-Made Medicines Caucus	Claudia Tenney (R)	
Congressional American-Made Medicines Caucus	Gus Bilirakis (R)	
Congressional Ancient Civilizations and Archeology Caucus	Anna Paulina Luna (R)	
Congressional Animal Protection Caucus	Brian Fitzpatrick (R)	
Congressional Animal Protection Caucus	Mike Quigley (D)	
Congressional Animal Protection Caucus	Vern Buchanan (R)	
Congressional Animal Protection Caucus	Sharice Davids (D)	
Congressional Animal Protection Caucus	Nicole Malliotakis (R)	
Congressional Animal Protection Caucus	Jamie Raskin (D)	
Congressional Anti-Woke Caucus	Harriet Hageman (R)	
Congressional Appalachian Caucus	Guy Reschenthaler (R)	
Congressional Appalachian Caucus	Carol Miller (R)	
Congressional Apprenticeship Caucus	Brett Guthrie (R)	
Congressional Apprenticeship Caucus	Suzanne Bonamici (D)	
Congressional Aquaculture Caucus	Kat Cammack (R)	
Congressional Aquaculture Caucus	Mike Ezell (R)	
Congressional Aquaculture Caucus	Ed Case (D)	
Congressional Aquaculture Caucus	Jimmy Panetta (D)	
Congressional Argentina Caucus	Michael Rulli (R)	
Congressional Argentina Caucus	Darren Soto (D)	
Congressional Army Caucus	John Carter (R)	
Congressional Army Caucus	Jason Crow (D)	
Congressional Army Aviation Caucus	Dale Strong (R)	
Congressional Army Aviation Caucus	Rosa DeLauro (D)	
Congressional Artificial Intelligence Caucus	Don Beyer (D)	
Congressional Artificial Intelligence Caucus	Jay Obernolte (R)	
Congressional Artificial Intelligence Caucus	Michael McCaul (R)	
Congressional Artificial Intelligence Caucus	Doris Matsui (D)	
Congressional Arts Caucus	Chellie Pingree (D)	
Congressional Arts Caucus	Mike Turner (R)	
Congressional Ashraf Caucus	Lance Gooden (R)	
Asian Pacific American Caucus	Grace Meng (D)	
Congressional Association of Southeast Nations (ASEAN) Caucus	Ami Bera (D)	
Congressional Association of Southeast Nations (ASEAN) Caucus	Ann Wagner (R)	
Congressional Austria Caucus	Greg Murphy (R)	
Congressional Austria Caucus	Rick Larsen (D)	
Congressional Automotive Performance and Motorsports Caucus	Vacant	
Congressional Automotive Performance and Motorsports Caucus	Sanford Bishop (D)	
Congressional Autonomous Vehicle (AV) Caucus	Bob Latta (R)	
Congressional Autonomous Vehicle (AV) Caucus	Debbie Dingell (D)	
Congressional Aviation Safety Caucus	Nick Langworthy (R)	
Congressional Azerbaijan Caucus	Robert Aderholt (R)	
Congressional Azerbaijan Caucus	Steve Cohen (D)	
Congressional Baking Caucus	John Joyce (R)	
Congressional Baking Caucus	Don Davis (D)	
Congressional Bangladesh Caucus	Joe Wilson (R)	
Congressional Bangladesh Caucus	Nellie Pou (D)	
Congressional Baseball Caucus	Roger Williams (R)	
Congressional Battlefield Caucus	Jen Kiggans (R)	
Congressional Battlefield Caucus	Seth Magaziner (D)	
Congressional Berry Amendment Caucus	Don Davis (D)	
Congressional Berry Amendment Caucus	Pat Harrigan (R)	
Congressional Biofuels Caucus	Adrian Smith (R)	
Congressional Biofuels Caucus	Angie Craig (D)	
Congressional Biofuels Caucus	Ashley Hinson (R)	
Congressional Biofuels Caucus	Mark Pocan (D)	
Congressional Biofuels Caucus	Julie Fedorchak (R)	
Congressional Biofuels Caucus	Nikki Budzinski (D)	
Congressional Biomedical Research Caucus	Steve Cohen (D)	
Congressional Biomedical Research Caucus	Mike Kennedy (R)	
Congressional Bipartisan E-Learning Caucus	Alma Adams (D)	
Congressional Bipartisan E-Learning Caucus	Glenn Thompson (R)	
Congressional Bipartisan Historically Black Colleges and Universities (HBCU) Caucus	Alma Adams (D)	
Congressional Bipartisan Historically Black Colleges and Universities (HBCU) Caucus	French Hill (R)	
Congressional Bipartisan Mental Health Caucus	Don Bacon (R)	
Congressional Bipartisan Mental Health Caucus	Don Beyer (D)	
Congressional Bipartisan Mental Health Caucus	Tony Gonzales (R)	
Congressional Bipartisan Mental Health Caucus	Andrea Salinas (D)	
Congressional Bipartisan Opportunity Youth Caucus	Troy Carter (D)	
Congressional Bipartisan Opportunity Youth Caucus	Rob Bresnahan (R)	
Congressional Bipartisan Policy Working Group (BPWG)	Scott Peters (D)	
Congressional Bipartisan Policy Working Group (BPWG)	Jack Bergman (R)	
Congressional Bipartisan Policy Working Group (BPWG)	John Rutherford (R)	
Congressional Bipartisan Rural Broadband Caucus	Angie Craig (D)	
Congressional Bipartisan Rural Broadband Caucus	David Taylor (R)	
Congressional Bipartisan Rural Broadband Caucus	Jim Clyburn (D)	
Congressional Bipartisan Rural Broadband Caucus	Rob Wittman (R)	
Congressional Bipartisan Rural Broadband Caucus	Teresa Leger Fernandez (D)	
Congressional Bipartisan Rural Broadband Caucus	Bob Latta (R)	
Congressional Bipartisan Rural Health Caucus	Jill Tokuda (D)	
Congressional Bipartisan Rural Health Caucus	Diana Harshbarger (R)	
Congressional Bipartisan School Safety and Security Caucus	Tony Gonzales (R)	
Congressional Bipartisan School Safety and Security Caucus	Jared Moskowitz (D)	
Congressional Bipartisan Unified Voices Caucus	Kat Cammack (R)	
Congressional Bipartisan Unified Voices Caucus	Troy Carter (D)	
Congressional Black Caucus	Yvette Clarke (D)	
Congressional Black Maternal Health Caucus	Alma Adams (D)	
Congressional Black Maternal Health Caucus	Lauren Underwood (D)	
Congressional Boating Caucus	Rudy Yakym (R)	
Congressional Boating Caucus	Don Davis (D)	
Congressional Border Security Caucus	Brian Babin (R)	
Congressional Border Security Caucus	Andy Biggs (R)	
Congressional Border Trade Caucus	Tony Gonzales (R)	
Congressional Border Trade Caucus	Juan Ciscomani (R)	
Congressional Border Trade Caucus	Lou Correa (D)	
Congressional Border Trade Caucus	Juan Vargas (D)	
Congressional Bourbon Caucus	Andy Barr (R)	
Congressional Bourbon Caucus	Morgan McGarvey (D)	
Congressional Brazil Caucus	Sydney Kamlager-Dove (D)	
Congressional Brazil Caucus	Lance Gooden (R)	
Congressional Bulgaria Caucus	Joe Wilson (R)	
Congressional Bulgaria Caucus	Neal Dunn (R)	
Congressional Bulgaria Caucus	Richard Neal (D)	
Congressional Bulgaria Caucus	Brad Schneider (D)	
Congressional Burma Caucus	Betty McCollum (D)	
Congressional Burma Caucus	Bill Huizenga (R)	
Congressional Bus Caucus	Darin LaHood (R)	
Congressional Bus Caucus	Rick Larsen (D)	
Congressional Cambodia Caucus	Lori Trahan (D)	
Congressional Cambodia Caucus	Beth Van Duyne (R)	
Congressional Camp Caucus	Chuck Edwards (R)	
Congressional Cancer Prevention Caucus	Debbie Dingell (D)	
Congressional Cancer Prevention Caucus	John James (R)	
Congressional Cancer Survivors Caucus	Mark DeSaulnier (D)	
Congressional Cancer Survivors Caucus	Buddy Carter (R)	
Congressional Candy Caucus	Lloyd Smucker (R)	
Congressional Candy Caucus	Brad Schneider (D)	
Congressional Career and Technical Education (CTE) Caucus	Glenn Thompson (R)	
Congressional Career and Technical Education (CTE) Caucus	Suzanne Bonamici (D)	
Congressional Caucus for Effective Foreign Assistance	Adam Smith (D)	
Congressional Caucus for Effective Foreign Assistance	Young Kim (R)	
Congressional Caucus on Armenian Issues	Frank Pallone (D)	
Congressional Caucus on Armenian Issues	Gus Bilirakis (R)	
Congressional Caucus on Armenian Issues	David Valadao (R)	
Congressional Caucus on Armenian Issues	Brad Sherman (D)	
Congressional Caucus on Black Innovation	Stacey Plaskett (D)	
Congressional Caucus on Black Innovation	Marilyn Strickland (D)	
Congressional Caucus on Bosnia	Mike Turner (R)	
Congressional Caucus on Bosnia	Jake Auchincloss (D)	
Congressional Caucus on Bosnia	Wesley Bell (D)	
Congressional Caucus on Bosnia	Ann Wagner (R)	
Congressional Caucus on Extreme Heat	Greg Stanton (D)	
Congressional Caucus on Extreme Heat	Mike Lawler (R)	
Congressional Caucus on Foster Youth	Gwen Moore (D)	
Congressional Caucus on Foster Youth	Don Bacon (R)	
Congressional Caucus on Foster Youth	Mary Gay Scanlon (D)	
Congressional Caucus on Foster Youth	Zach Nunn (R)	
Congressional Caucus on Foster Youth	Sydney Kamlager-Dove (D)	
Congressional Caucus on Global Migration	Delia Ramirez (D)	
Congressional Caucus on Global Migration	Greg Casar (D)	
Congressional Caucus on Global Migration	Sydney Kamlager-Dove (D)	
Congressional Caucus on Homelessness	Nanette Barragán (D)	
Congressional Caucus on Homelessness	Suzanne Bonamici (D)	
Congressional Caucus on Homelessness	Sylvia Garcia (D)	
Congressional Caucus on Homelessness	Delia Ramirez (D)	
Congressional Caucus on India and Indian Americans	Ro Khanna (D)	
Congressional Caucus on India and Indian Americans	Rich McCormick (R)	
Congressional Caucus on Korea	Joe Wilson (R)	
Congressional Caucus on Korea	Marilyn Strickland (D)	
Congressional Caucus on Korea	Mike Kelly (R)	
Congressional Caucus on Korea	Ami Bera (D)	
Congressional Caucus on Longevity Science	Paul Tonko (D)	
Congressional Caucus on Longevity Science	Gus Bilirakis (R)	
Congressional Caucus on Qatari-American Strategic Relationships	Joe Wilson (R)	
Congressional Caucus on Qatari-American Strategic Relationships	André Carson (D)	
Congressional Caucus on Small Brewers	Mike Kelly (R)	
Congressional Caucus on Small Brewers	Marilyn Strickland (D)	
Congressional Caucus on Small Brewers	Pat Harrigan (R)	
Congressional Caucus on Small Brewers	Nikema Williams (D)	
Congressional Caucus on U.S. - Türkiye Relations and Turkish Americans	Joe Wilson (R)	
Congressional Caucus on U.S. - Türkiye Relations and Turkish Americans	Vacant	
Congressional Caucus on U.S. - Türkiye Relations and Turkish Americans	Amata Radewagen (R)	
Congressional Caucus on U.S. - Türkiye Relations and Turkish Americans	Steve Cohen (D)	
Congressional Caucus on the Equal Rights Amendment	Ayanna Pressley (D)	
Congressional Caucus on the Equal Rights Amendment	Jennifer McClellan (D)	
Congressional Caucus on Virtual, Augmented, and Mixed Reality Technologies	Suzan DelBene (D)	
Congressional Caucus on Virtual, Augmented, and Mixed Reality Technologies	Yvette Clarke (D)	
Congressional Caucus on Virtual, Augmented, and Mixed Reality Technologies	Ted Lieu (D)	
Congressional CBD Caucus	Morgan Griffith (R)	
Congressional CBD Caucus	Marc Veasey (D)	
Congressional Celiac Disease Caucus	Betty McCollum (D)	
Congressional Cement Caucus	Ryan Mackenzie (R)	
Congressional Cement Caucus	Jay Obernolte (R)	
Congressional Certified Public Accountant (CPA) & Accountants Caucus	Brad Sherman (D)	
Congressional Certified Public Accountant (CPA) & Accountants Caucus	Victoria Spartz (R)	
Congressional Chemistry Caucus	John Moolenaar (R)	
Congressional Chemistry Caucus	Sanford Bishop (D)	
Congressional Chicken Caucus	Jim Costa (D)	
Congressional Chicken Caucus	Steve Womack (R)	
Congressional Childhood Cancer Caucus	Michael McCaul (R)	
Congressional Childhood Cancer Caucus	Ami Bera (D)	
Congressional Childhood Cancer Caucus	Mike Kelly (R)	
Congressional Childhood Cancer Caucus	Kathy Castor (D)	
Congressional Children's Health Care Caucus	Kathy Castor (D)	
Congressional Children's Health Care Caucus	John Joyce (R)	
Congressional Clubhouse Caucus	Ritchie Torres (D)	
Congressional Coal Caucus	Morgan Griffith (R)	
Congressional Coal Caucus	Dan Meuser (R)	
Congressional Coal Caucus	Harriet Hageman (R)	
Congressional Coal Caucus	Carol Miller (R)	
Congressional Coalition on Adoption	Robert Aderholt (R)	
Congressional Coalition on Adoption	Danny Davis (D)	
Congressional Coastal Communities Caucus	Frank Pallone (D)	
Congressional Coastal Communities Caucus	John Rutherford (R)	
Congressional Coastal Communities Caucus	David Rouzer (R)	
Congressional Coffee Caucus	Jill Tokuda (D)	
Congressional Coffee Caucus	William Timmons (R)	
Congressional College Football Caucus	Roger Williams (R)	
Congressional College Sports Caucus	Michael Baumgartner (R)	
Congressional Colombia Caucus	Mario Diaz-Balart (R)	
Congressional Colombia Caucus	Henry Cuellar (D)	
Congressional Colorado River Caucus	Joe Neguse (D)	
Congressional Colorado River Caucus	Juan Ciscomani (R)	
Congressional Community Action Caucus	Betty McCollum (D)	
Congressional Community Action Caucus	Claudia Tenney (R)	
Congressional Community Action Caucus	Suzanne Bonamici (D)	
Congressional Community Action Caucus	Glenn Thompson (R)	
Congressional Community College Caucus	Gus Bilirakis (R)	
Congressional Community College Caucus	Joe Courtney (D)	
Congressional Community Foundation Caucus	Gabe Amo (D)	
Congressional Community Foundation Caucus	Brian Fitzpatrick (R)	
Congressional Community Health Center Caucus	Troy Balderson (R)	
Congressional Community Health Center Caucus	Jen Kiggans (R)	
Congressional Community Health Center Caucus	Rosa DeLauro (D)	
Congressional Community Health Center Caucus	Danny Davis (D)	
Congressional Community Safety Caucus	Gabe Amo (D)	
Congressional Community Safety Caucus	Hank Johnson (D)	
Congressional Community Safety Caucus	Summer Lee (D)	
Congressional Community Safety Caucus	Morgan McGarvey (D)	
Congressional Community Safety Caucus	LaMonica McIver (D)	
Congressional Community Safety Caucus	Delia Ramirez (D)	
Congressional Conservative Climate Caucus	Mariannette Miller-Meeks (R)	
Congressional Copper Caucus	Bob Latta (R)	
Congressional Copper Caucus	Brittany Pettersen (D)	
Congressional Counter-Terrorism Caucus	Andy Ogles (R)	
Congressional Cranberry Caucus	William Keating (D)	
Congressional Cranberry Caucus	Sen. Tammy Baldwin (D)	
Congressional Creator Economy Caucus	Beth Van Duyne (R)	
Congressional Creator Economy Caucus	Yvette Clarke (D)	
Congressional Croatia Caucus	David Joyce (R)	
Congressional Croatia Caucus	Nanette Barragán (D)	
Congressional Croatia Caucus	Claudia Tenney (R)	
Congressional Croatia Caucus	Ted Lieu (D)	
Congressional Crohn's and Colitis Caucus	Josh Gottheimer (D)	
Congressional Crohn's and Colitis Caucus	John Rutherford (R)	
Congressional Crop Insurance Caucus	Austin Scott (R)	
Congressional Crop Insurance Caucus	Tracey Mann (R)	
Congressional Crop Insurance Caucus	Salud Carbajal (D)	
Congressional Crypto Caucus	Tom Emmer (R)	
Congressional Crypto Caucus	Ritchie Torres (D)	
Congressional Cut Flower Caucus	Salud Carbajal (D)	
Congressional Cut Flower Caucus	Dan Newhouse (R)	
Congressional Cut Flower Caucus	Jimmy Panetta (D)	
Congressional Cut Flower Caucus	Vacant	
Congressional Cut Flower Caucus	Chellie Pingree (D)	
Congressional Cut Flower Caucus	Jeff Hurd (R)	
Congressional Czech Caucus	Lloyd Doggett (D)	
Congressional Czech Caucus	Mario Díaz-Balart (R)	
Congressional Dads Caucus	Jimmy Gomez (D)	
Congressional Deaf Caucus	Mark Takano (D)	
Congressional Deaf Caucus	John Rutherford (R)	
Congressional Deafblind Caucus	April McClain Delaney (D)	
Congressional Deafblind Caucus	Morgan McGarvey (D)	
Congressional Defense Spending Reduction Caucus	Mark Pocan (D)	
Congressional Defense Spending Reduction Caucus	Ilhan Omar (D)	
Congressional Democratic Doctors Caucus	Ami Bera (D)	
Congressional Democratic Doctors Caucus	Raul Ruiz (D)	
Congressional Democratic Doctors Caucus	Kim Schrier (D)	
Congressional Democratic Doctors Caucus	Maxine Dexter (D)	
Congressional Democratic Doctors Caucus	Kelly Morrison (D)	
Congressional Democratic Doctors Caucus	Herb Conaway (D)	
Congressional Diabetes Caucus	Diana DeGette (D)	
Congressional Diabetes Caucus	Gus Bilirakis (R)	
Congressional Dietary Supplements Caucus	Mike Kennedy (R)	
Congressional Dietary Supplements Caucus	Marc Veasey (D)	
Congressional Digital Health Caucus	Troy Balderson (R)	
Congressional Digital Health Caucus	Robin Kelly (D)	
Congressional Direct Selling Caucus	Richard Hudson (R)	
Congressional Direct Selling Caucus	Darren Soto (D)	
Congressional Disability Employment Choice Caucus	Glenn Grothman (R)	
Congressional Disaster Equity and Building Resilience Caucus	Troy Carter (D)	
Congressional Disaster Equity and Building Resilience Caucus	Bennie Thompson (D)	
Congressional Disaster Equity and Building Resilience Caucus	Dina Titus (D)	
Congressional Disaster Equity and Building Resilience Caucus	Mike Kennedy (R)	
Congressional Disaster Preparedness and Recovery Caucus	Troy Carter (D)	
Congressional Disaster Preparedness and Recovery Caucus	Jared Moskowitz (D)	
Congressional Disaster Preparedness and Recovery Caucus	Carlos Giménez (R)	
Congressional Disaster Preparedness and Recovery Caucus	Joe Neguse (D)	
Congressional Diversion and Rehabilitation Caucus	Wesley Bell (D)	
Congressional Diversion and Rehabilitation Caucus	Carol Miller (R)	
Congressional Diversity, Equity, and Inclusion Caucus	Jonathan Jackson (D)	
Congressional Diversity, Equity, and Inclusion Caucus	Cleo Fields (D)	
Congressional Dutch Caucus	Hillary Scholten (D)	
Congressional Dutch Caucus	Vince Fong (R)	
Congressional Dyslexia Caucus	Bruce Westerman (R)	
Congressional Dyslexia Caucus	Julia Brownley (D)	
Congressional Education Caucus	Cleo Fields (D)	
Congressional Egypt Human Rights Caucus	Donald Beyer (D)	
Congressional Egypt Human Rights Caucus	Suzan DelBene (D)	
Congressional El Salvador Caucus	Anna Paulina Luna (R)	
Congressional El Salvador Caucus	Vicente Gonzalez (D)	
Congressional Emergency Medical Services (EMS) Caucus	Richard Hudson (R)	
Congressional Emergency Medical Services (EMS) Caucus	Debbie Dingell (D)	
Congressional End Corruption Caucus	Jason Crow (D)	
Congressional End Corruption Caucus	Alexandria Ocasio-Cortez (D)	
Congressional End Corruption Caucus	Mike Levin (D)	
Congressional Endometriosis Caucus	Nikema Williams (D)	
Congressional Energy Export Caucus	Henry Cuellar (D)	
Congressional Energy Export Caucus	Jodey Arrington (R)	
Congressional Energy Export Caucus	Lou Correa (D)	
Congressional Energy Export Caucus	Carol Miller (R)	
Congressional Entrepreneurship Caucus	French Hill (R)	
Congressional Entrepreneurship Caucus	Roger Williams (R)	
Congressional Entrepreneurship Caucus	David Schweikert (R)	
Congressional Entrepreneurship Caucus	Marc Veasey (D)	
Congressional Entrepreneurship Caucus	Don Beyer (D)	
Congressional Entrepreneurship Caucus	Suzan DelBene (D)	
Congressional Epilepsy Caucus	Jim Costa (D)	
Congressional Epilepsy Caucus	Greg Murphy (R)	
Congressional Equality Caucus	Mark Takano (D)	
Congressional Estuary Caucus	Brian Mast (R)	
Congressional Estuary Caucus	Mike Haridopolos (R)	
Congressional Estuary Caucus	Suzanne Bonamici (D)	
Congressional Estuary Caucus	Rick Larsen (D)	
Congressional Everglades Caucus	Debbie Wasserman Schultz (D)	
Congressional Everglades Caucus	Mario Díaz-Balart (R)	
Congressional Expand Social Security Caucus	John Larson (D)	
Congressional Expand Social Security Caucus	Raúl Grijalva (D)	
Congressional Expand Social Security Caucus	Debbie Dingell (D)	
Congressional Family Business Caucus	Claudia Tenney (R)	
Congressional Family Business Caucus	Lou Correa (D)	
Congressional Farmer Cooperative Caucus	Jim Costa (D)	
Congressional Farmer Cooperative Caucus	Sam Graves (R)	
Congressional Federal Workforce Caucus	James Walkinshaw (D)	
Congressional Federal Workforce Caucus	Steny Hoyer (D)	
Congressional Ferry Caucus	Emily Randall (D)	
Congressional Ferry Caucus	John Garamendi (D)	
Congressional Ferry Caucus	Nick Begich (R)	
Congressional Ferry Caucus	Nicole Malliotakis (R)	
Congressional Fertilizer Caucus	Frank Lucas (R)	
Congressional Fertilizer Caucus	Dan Newhouse (R)	
Congressional Fertilizer Caucus	Jim Costa (D)	
Congressional Fertilizer Caucus	Don Davis (D)	
Congressional FFA Caucus	Tracey Mann (R)	
Congressional FFA Caucus	Jimmy Panetta (D)	
Congressional FIFA World Cup 2026 Caucus	Sharice Davids (D)	
Congressional Financial Literacy and Wealth Creation Caucus	Joyce Beatty (D)	
Congressional Financial Literacy and Wealth Creation Caucus	Young Kim (R)	
Congressional Fire Services Caucus	Mike Bost (R)	
Congressional Fire Services Caucus	Brian Fitzpatrick (R)	
Congressional Fire Services Caucus	John Larson (D)	
Congressional Fire Services Caucus	Steny Hoyer (D)	
Congressional Firework Caucus	Eric Burlison (R)	
Congressional Firework Caucus	Jared Moskowitz (D)	
Congressional Fix Congress Caucus	William Timmons (R)	
Congressional Fix Congress Caucus	Scott Peters (D)	
Congressional Food Recovery Caucus	Chellie Pingree (D)	
Congressional Food Recovery Caucus	Dan Newhouse (R)	
Congressional Forensic Science Caucus	Michael Guest (R)	
Congressional Forensic Science Caucus	Emanuel Cleaver (D)	
Congressional Former Mayors Caucus	Mike Turner (R)	
Congressional Former Mayors Caucus	Sam Liccardo (D)	
Congressional Fragrance Caucus	Barry Loudermilk (R)	
Congressional Fragrance Caucus	Bonnie Watson Coleman (D)	
Congressional Frederick Douglass Trafficking Victims Protection and Prevention Caucus	Chris Smith (R)	
Congressional Frederick Douglass Trafficking Victims Protection and Prevention Caucus	Kweisi Mfume (D)	
Congressional Free Enterprise Caucus	August Pfluger (R)	
Congressional Free Enterprise Caucus	David Valadao (R)	
Congressional Freethought Caucus	Jared Huffman (D)	
Congressional Freethought Caucus	Jamie Raskin (D)	
Congressional French Caucus	Joe Wilson (R)	
Congressional French Caucus	Bill Keating (D)	
Congressional French Caucus	Bob Latta (R)	
Congressional French Caucus	Dina Titus (D)	
Congressional Friends of Australia Caucus	Joe Courtney (D)	
Congressional Friends of Australia Caucus	Andy Barr (R)	
Congressional Friends of Egypt Caucus	Mario Díaz-Balart (R)	
Congressional Friends of Egypt Caucus	Jared Moskowitz (D)	
Congressional Friends of Indonesia Caucus	Carol Miller (R)	
Congressional Friends of Indonesia Caucus	Marilyn Strickland (D)	
Congressional Friends of Ireland Caucus	Richard Neal (D)	
Congressional Friends of Ireland Caucus	Mike Kelly (R)	
Congressional Friends of Jesuit Colleges and Universities Caucus	Mark DeSaulnier (D)	
Congressional Friends of Jesuit Colleges and Universities Caucus	Juan Vargas (D)	
Congressional Friends of Liechtenstein Caucus	Joe Wilson (R)	
Congressional Friends of Liechtenstein Caucus	Don Beyer (D)	
Congressional Friends of Malta Caucus	Joe Wilson (R)	
Congressional Friends of Malta Caucus	Don Beyer (D)	
Congressional Friends of New Zealand Caucus	Keith Self (R)	
Congressional Friends of New Zealand Caucus	Rick Larsen (D)	
Congressional Friends of Norway Caucus	Julie Fedorchak (R)	
Congressional Friends of Norway Caucus	Rick Larsen (D)	
Congressional Friends of Norway Caucus	Betty McCollum (D)	
Congressional Friends of Spain Caucus	Pablo Hernández Rivera (D)	
Congressional Friends of Spain Caucus	Carlos Giménez (R)	
Congressional Friends of Sweden Caucus	Jack Bergman (R)	
Congressional Friends of Sweden Caucus	Chellie Pingree (D)	
Congressional Friends of Switzerland Caucus	Jim McGovern (D)	
Congressional Friends of Switzerland Caucus	Bill Huizenga (R)	
Congressional Friends of Tunisia Caucus	Betty McCollum (D)	
Congressional Friends of Tunisia Caucus	David Schweikert (R)	
Congressional Friends of Wales Caucus	Morgan Griffith (R)	
Congressional Friends of Wales Caucus	Lloyd Doggett (D)	
Congressional Friends of Yemen Caucus	Joe Wilson (R)	
Congressional Friends of Yemen Caucus	Shri Thanedar (D)	
Congressional Fusion Energy Caucus	Chuck Fleischmann (R)	
Congressional Fusion Energy Caucus	Jay Obernolte (R)	
Congressional Fusion Energy Caucus	Don Beyer (D)	
Congressional Fusion Energy Caucus	Lori Trahan (D)	
Congressional Gaming Caucus	Guy Reschenthaler (R)	
Congressional Gaming Caucus	Dina Titus (D)	
Congressional General Aviation Caucus	Sam Graves (R)	
Congressional General Aviation Caucus	Marc Veasey (D)	
Congressional Georgia Caucus	Joe Wilson (R)	
Congressional Georgia Caucus	Steve Cohen (D)	
Congressional Geosynthetic Materials Caucus	Bruce Westerman (R)	
Congressional Geosynthetic Materials Caucus	Marc Veasey (D)	
Congressional Geothermal Caucus	Jake Auchincloss (D)	
Congressional Geothermal Caucus	Nick Begich (R)	
Congressional Geothermal Caucus	Jeff Hurd (R)	
Congressional Geothermal Caucus	Andrea Salinas (D)	
Congressional German-American Caucus	Glenn Thompson (R)	
Congressional German-American Caucus	William Keating (D)	
Congressional Glaucoma Caucus	Frederica Wilson (D)	
Congressional Global Health Caucus	Frederica Wilson (D)	
Congressional Global Water Security Caucus	Grace Meng (D)	
Congressional Global Water Security Caucus	Darin LaHood (R)	
Congressional Global Water Security Caucus	Madeleine Dean (D)	
Congressional Golf Caucus	Richard Hudson (R)	
Congressional Golf Caucus	Nancy Mace (R)	
Congressional Golf Caucus	Scott Peters (D)	
Congressional Golf Caucus	Jimmy Panetta (D)	
Congressional GOP Doctors Caucus	John Joyce (R)	
Congressional GOP Doctors Caucus	Greg Murphy (R)	
Congressional GPS Caucus	Sharice Davids (D)	
Congressional GPS Caucus	Jeff Crank (R)	
Congressional Grid Innovation Caucus	Bob Latta (R)	
Congressional Grid Innovation Caucus	Marilyn Strickland (D)	
Congressional Gulf South Business Caucus	Bruce Westerman (R)	
Congressional Health Care Innovation Caucus	Ami Bera (D)	
Congressional Health Care Innovation Caucus	Mike Kelly (R)	
Congressional Health Care Innovation Caucus	Suzan DelBene (D)	
Congressional Health Care Innovation Caucus	Neal Dunn (R)	
Congressional Hellenic Caucus	Gus Bilirakis (R)	
Congressional Hellenic Caucus	Chris Pappas (D)	
Congressional Hindu Caucus	Pete Sessions (R)	
Congressional Hindu, Buddhist, Sikh, and Jain American Caucus	Shri Thanedar (D)	
Congressional Hispanic Caucus	Adriano Espaillat (D)	
Congressional Hispanic Conference	Tony Gonzales (R)	
Congressional History Caucus	John Larson (D)	
Congressional History Caucus	Jen Kiggans (R)	
Congressional HIV/AIDS Caucus	Mark Pocan (D)	
Congressional Hockey Caucus	Pete Stauber (R)	
Congressional Hockey Caucus	Mike Quigley (D)	
Congressional Horse Caucus	Andy Barr (R)	
Congressional Horse Caucus	Paul Tonko (D)	
Congressional Humanities Caucus	Dina Titus (D)	
Congressional Humanities Caucus	Mike Carey (R)	
Congressional Hungary Caucus	Marcy Kaptur (D)	
Congressional Hungary Caucus	Andy Harris (R)	
Congressional Hunger Caucus	Jim McGovern (D)	
Congressional Hunger Caucus	Tracey Mann (R)	
Congressional Hydrogen and Fuel Cell Caucus	John Larson (D)	
Congressional Hydrogen and Fuel Cell Caucus	Paul Tonko (D)	
Congressional Hypersonics Caucus	Mark Messmer (R)	
Congressional Hypersonics Caucus	Donald Norcross (D)	
Congressional Iceland Caucus	Chellie Pingree (D)	
Congressional Iceland Caucus	Greg Murphy (R)	
Congressional Independent Colleges Caucus	Ben Cline (R)	
Congressional Independent Colleges Caucus	Deborah Ross (D)	
Congressional India-Israel Caucus	Shri Thanedar (D)	
Congressional International Basic Education Caucus	Brian Fitzpatrick (R)	
Congressional International Basic Education Caucus	Mike Quigley (D)	
Congressional International Conservation Caucus	Betty McCollum (D)	
Congressional International Conservation Caucus	David Joyce (R)	
Congressional International Conservation Caucus	Henry Cuellar (D)	
Congressional International Conservation Caucus	Guy Reschenthaler (R)	
Congressional International Exchanges Caucus	Ami Bera (D)	
Congressional International Exchanges Caucus	Jeff Van Drew (R)	
Congressional International Financial Institutions (IFI) Education Caucus	John Rutherford (R)	
Congressional International Financial Institutions (IFI) Education Caucus	Brittany Pettersen (D)	
Congressional Internet of Things Caucus	Suzan DelBene (D)	
Congressional Inventions Caucus	Kevin Kiley (I)	
Congressional Inventions Caucus	Deborah Ross (D)	
Congressional Iraq Caucus	Seth Moulton (D)	
Congressional Iraq Caucus	Trent Kelly (R)	
Congressional Israel Allies Caucus	Chris Smith (R)	
Congressional Israel Allies Caucus	Brad Sherman (D)	
Congressional Israel Allies Caucus	Ronny Jackson (R)	
Congressional Israel Allies Caucus	Brad Schneider (D)	
Congressional Jazz Caucus	Danny Davis (D)	
Congressional Jewish Caucus	Jerry Nadler (D)	
Congressional Jewish Caucus	Brad Schneider (D)	
Congressional Job Corps Caucus	Brett Guthrie (R)	
Congressional Job Corps Caucus	Sanford Bishop (D)	
Congressional Joint Strike Fighter Force Caucus	Mike Turner (R)	
Congressional Joint Strike Fighter Force Caucus	John Rutherford (R)	
Congressional Joint Strike Fighter Force Caucus	Marc Veasey (D)	
Congressional Joint Strike Fighter Force Caucus	John Larson (D)	
Congressional Justice for Warriors Caucus	Eli Crane (R)	
Congressional Kidney Caucus	Carol Miller (R)	
Congressional Kidney Caucus	Suzan DelBene (D)	
Congressional Labor Caucus	Donald Norcross (D)	
Congressional Labor Caucus	Mark Pocan (D)	
Congressional Labor Caucus	Debbie Dingell (D)	
Congressional Latino-Jewish Caucus	Tony Gonzales (R)	
Congressional Latino-Jewish Caucus	Adriano Espaillat (D)	
Congressional Latino-Jewish Caucus	Mario Díaz-Balart (R)	
Congressional Latino-Jewish Caucus	Debbie Wasserman Schultz (D)	
Congressional Law Enforcement Caucus	John Rutherford (R)	
Congressional Law Enforcement Caucus	Josh Gottheimer (D)	
Congressional Library of Congress Caucus	Robert Aderholt (R)	
Congressional Library of Congress Caucus	Mike Levin (D)	
Congressional Long Island Sound Caucus	Nick LaLota (R)	
Congressional Long Island Sound Caucus	Joe Courtney (D)	
Congressional Lowering Costs Caucus	Hillary Scholten (D)	
Congressional Lowering Costs Caucus	Derek Tran (D)	
Congressional Lowering Costs Caucus	Greg Landsman (D)	
Congressional Lowering Utility Bills Caucus	Josh Riley (D)	
Congressional Macedonian Caucus	Claudia Tenney (R)	
Congressional Macedonian Caucus	Brendan Boyle (D)	
Congressional Macedonian Caucus	Debbie Dingell (D)	
Congressional Macedonian Caucus	Lisa McClain (R)	
Congressional Mamas' Caucus	Rashida Tlaib (D)	
Congressional Manufacturing Caucus	David Joyce (R)	
Congressional Manufacturing Caucus	Haley Stevens (D)	
Congressional Manufacturing Caucus	Jay Obernolte (R)	
Congressional Manufacturing Caucus	Chris Deluzio (D)	
Congressional Maple Caucus	Chris Pappas (D)	
Congressional Maple Caucus	Claudia Tenney (R)	
Congressional Maple Caucus	Becca Balint (D)	
Congressional Maple Caucus	Nick Langworthy (R)	
Congressional Men's Health Caucus	Troy Carter (D)	
Congressional Men's Health Caucus	Rich McCormick (R)	
Congressional Men's Health Caucus	Neal Dunn (R)	
Congressional Men's Health Caucus	Ted Lieu (D)	
Congressional Men's Health Caucus	Rob Menendez (R)	
Congressional Military and Veteran Caucus	Pete Sessions (R)	
Congressional Military and Veteran Caucus	Susie Lee (D)	
Congressional Military Family Caucus	Jen Kiggans (R)	
Congressional Military Family Caucus	Sanford D. Bishop Jr. (D)	
Congressional Military Mental Health Caucus	Gil Cisneros (D)	
Congressional Military Mental Health Caucus	Jen Kiggans (R)	
Congressional Military Sexual Assault Prevention and Response Caucus	Mike Turner (R)	
Congressional Military Sexual Assault Prevention and Response Caucus	Gil Cisneros (D)	
Congressional Moldova Caucus	Deborah Ross (D)	
Congressional Moldova Caucus	Mike Lawler (R)	
Congressional Mongolian Caucus	Dina Titus (D)	
Congressional Mongolian Caucus	John Moolenaar (R)	
Congressional Monopoly Busters Caucus	Pramila Jayapal (D)	
Congressional Monopoly Busters Caucus	Pat Ryan (D)	
Congressional Monopoly Busters Caucus	Chris Deluzio (D)	
Congressional Monopoly Busters Caucus	Angie Craig (D)	
Congressional Montenegro Caucus	Chellie Pingree (D)	
Congressional Montenegro Caucus	Mike Turner (R)	
Congressional Morocco Caucus	Joe Wilson (R)	
Congressional Morocco Caucus	Brad Schneider (D)	
Congressional Motorcycle Caucus	Tim Walberg (R)	
Congressional Motorcycle Caucus	Troy Balderson (R)	
Congressional Motorcycle Caucus	Donald Norcross (D)	
Congressional Motorcycle Caucus	Derrick Van Orden (R)	
Congressional Motorsports Caucus	Richard Hudson (R)	
Congressional Motorsports Caucus	Mike Thompson (D)	
Congressional Municipal Finance Caucus	Rudy Yakym (R)	
Congressional Municipal Finance Caucus	Terri Sewell (D)	
Congressional Museums Caucus	Mike Turner (R)	
Congressional Museums Caucus	Paul Tonko (D)	
Congressional Musicians' Caucus	Lloyd Doggett (D)	
Congressional Musicians' Caucus	Ron Estes (R)	
Congressional National Guard and Reserve Components Caucus	Trent Kelly (R)	
Congressional National Guard and Reserve Components Caucus	Ted Lieu (D)	
Congressional National Labs Caucus	Chuck Fleischmann (R)	
Congressional National Labs Caucus	Bill Foster (D)	
Congressional National Labs Caucus	Dan Newhouse (R)	
Congressional National Labs Caucus	Teresa Leger Fernandez (D)	
Congressional Native American Caucus	Tom Cole (R)	
Congressional Native American Caucus	Sharice Davids (D)	
Congressional Natural Gas Caucus	Mike Kelly (R)	
Congressional Natural Gas Caucus	Jim Costa (D)	
Congressional Natural Gas Caucus	Stephanie Bice (R)	
Congressional Natural Gas Caucus	Lizzie Fletcher (D)	
Congressional Navy and Marine Corps Caucus	Nick LaLota (R)	
Congressional Navy and Marine Corps Caucus	Chris Deluzio (D)	
Congressional New Americans Caucus	Norma Torres (D)	
Congressional New Americans Caucus	Adriano Espaillat (D)	
Congressional NextGen 9-1-1 Caucus	Kat Cammack (R)	
Congressional NextGen 9-1-1 Caucus	Norma Torres (D)	
Congressional Nuclear Cleanup Caucus	Chuck Fleischmann (R)	
Congressional Nuclear Cleanup Caucus	Susie Lee (D)	
Congressional Nuclear Security Working Group	Chuck Fleischmann (R)	
Congressional Nuclear Security Working Group	Bill Foster (D)	
Congressional Nuclear Weapons and Arms Control Working Group	John Garamendi (D)	
Congressional Nuclear Weapons and Arms Control Working Group	Don Beyer (D)	
Congressional Nuclear Weapons and Arms Control Working Group	Sen. Ed Markey (D)	
Congressional Nuclear Weapons and Arms Control Working Group	Sen. Jeff Merkley (D)	
Congressional Offshore Wind Caucus	Salud Carbajal (D)	
Congressional Offshore Wind Caucus	Jen Kiggans (R)	
Congressional Ohio River Basin Caucus	Morgan McGarvey (D)	
Congressional Ohio River Basin Caucus	Erin Houchin (R)	
Congressional Oil and Gas Caucus	Vicente Gonzalez (D)	
Congressional Olympic and Paralympic Caucus	Diana DeGette (D)	
Congressional Olympic and Paralympic Caucus	Elise Stefanik (R)	
Congressional Olympic and Paralympic Caucus	Ted Lieu (D)	
Congressional Olympic and Paralympic Caucus	Stephanie Bice (R)	
Congressional Optics and Photonics Caucus	Joe Morelle (D)	
Congressional Optics and Photonics Caucus	Brian Mast (R)	
Congressional Organ Transplant Caucus	Beth Van Duyne (R)	
Congressional Organ Transplant Caucus	Jim Costa (D)	
Congressional Pacific Islands	Aumua Amata Coleman Radewagen (R)	
Congressional Pacific Islands	Ed Case (D)	
Congressional Pakistan Caucus	Jack Bergman (R)	
Congressional Pakistan Caucus	Tom Suozzi (D)	
Congressional Paper and Packaging Caucus	Dan Newhouse (R)	
Congressional Paper and Packaging Caucus	Lou Correa (D)	
Congressional Parkinson's Disease Caucus	Gus Bilirakis (R)	
Congressional Parkinson's Disease Caucus	Hank Johnson (D)	
Congressional Payments and Financial Technology Caucus	Barry Loudermilk (R)	
Congressional Payments and Financial Technology Caucus	Vacant	
Congressional Peanut Caucus	Sanford D. Bishop (D)	
Congressional Peanut Caucus	Barry Moore (R)	
Congressional Peripheral Artery Disease (PAD) Caucus	Gus Bilirakis (R)	
Congressional Peripheral Artery Disease (PAD) Caucus	Sheila Cherfilus-McCormick (D)	
Congressional Peru Caucus	Robert Garcia (D)	
Congressional Peru Caucus	Carlos Giménez (R)	
Congressional Pet Caucus	David Valadao (R)	
Congressional Pet Caucus	Josh Harder (D)	
Congressional PFAS Task Force	Brian Fitzpatrick (R)	
Congressional PFAS Task Force	Debbie Dingell (D)	
Congressional PFAS Task Force	Jen Kiggans (R)	
Congressional PFAS Task Force	Kristen McDonald Rivet (D)	
Congressional Philanthropy Caucus	Blake Moore (R)	
Congressional Philanthropy Caucus	Danny Davis (D)	
Congressional Pilots Caucus	Sam Graves (R)	
Congressional Planetary Science Caucus	Don Bacon (R)	
Congressional Planetary Science Caucus	Judy Chu (D)	
Congressional Plasma Caucus	Buddy Carter (R)	
Congressional Plasma Caucus	Scott Peters (D)	
Congressional Poland Caucus	Marcy Kaptur (D)	
Congressional Poland Caucus	Bill Keating (D)	
Congressional Poland Caucus	Chris Smith (R)	
Congressional Poland Caucus	Mike Turner (R)	
Congressional Popular Arts Caucus	Robert Garcia (D)	
Congressional Ports, Opportunity, Renewal, Trade, and Security (PORTS) Caucus	Randy Weber (R)	
Congressional Ports, Opportunity, Renewal, Trade, and Security (PORTS) Caucus	Robert Garcia (D)	
Congressional Portuguese Caucus	David Valadao (R)	
Congressional Portuguese Caucus	Jim Costa (D)	
Congressional Postal Service Caucus	Nikki Budzinski (D)	
Congressional Postal Service Caucus	Jack Bergman (R)	
Congressional Postal Service Caucus	Chris Pappas (D)	
Congressional Postal Service Caucus	Andrew Garbarino (R)	
Congressional Prayer Caucus	Rick Allen (R)	
Congressional Pre-K and Child Care Caucus	Joaquin Castro (D)	
Congressional Pre-K and Child Care Caucus	Brian Fitzpatrick (R)	
Congressional Pre-K and Child Care Caucus	Suzanne Bonamici (D)	
Congressional Pre-K and Child Care Caucus	Ashley Hinson (R)	
Congressional Predominantly Black Institutions (PBI) Caucus	Danny Davis (D)	
Congressional Predominantly Black Institutions (PBI) Caucus	Yvette Clarke (D)	
Congressional Predominantly Black Institutions (PBI) Caucus	Jonathan Jackson (D)	
Congressional Predominantly Black Institutions (PBI) Caucus	Robin Kelly (D)	
Congressional Preventive Health and Wellness Caucus	Vern Buchanan (R)	
Congressional Preventive Health and Wellness Caucus	Gwen Moore (D)	
Congressional Printing Caucus	Scott Fitzgerald (R)	
Congressional Printing Caucus	Jared Golden (D)	
Congressional Printing Caucus	Claudia Tenney (R)	
Congressional Printing Caucus	Mark Pocan (D)	
Congressional Pro-Choice Caucus	Diana DeGette (D)	
Congressional Pro-Choice Caucus	Ayanna Pressley (D)	
Congressional Pro-Life Caucus	Chris Smith (R)	
Congressional Pro-Life Caucus	Andy Harris (R)	
Congressional Pro-Life Caucus	Michelle Fischbach (R)	
Congressional Pro-Life Caucus	Kat Cammack (R)	
Congressional Problem Solvers Caucus	Brian Fitzpatrick (R)	
Congressional Problem Solvers Caucus	Tom Suozzi (D)	
Congressional Progressive Caucus	Greg Casar (D)	
Congressional Propane Caucus	Bob Latta (R)	
Congressional Propane Caucus	Jim Costa (D)	
Congressional Public Health Caucus	Rob Wittman (R)	
Congressional Public Health Caucus	Lauren Underwood (D)	
Congressional Public Housing Caucus	Emanuel Cleaver (D)	
Congressional Public Housing Caucus	Stephen Lynch (D)	
Congressional Public Housing Caucus	Gregory Meeks (D)	
Congressional Public Housing Caucus	Ritchie Torres (D)	
Congressional Public Lands Caucus	Gabe Vasquez (D)	
Congressional Puget Sound Recovery Caucus	Marilyn Strickland (D)	
Congressional Puget Sound Recovery Caucus	Emily Randall (D)	
Congressional Quad Caucus	Ami Bera (D)	
Congressional Quad Caucus	Rob Wittman (R)	
Congressional Quiet Rails Caucus	Eleanor Holmes Norton (D)	
Congressional Rail Safety Caucus	Sylvia Garcia (D)	
Congressional Rail Safety Caucus	Michael Rulli (R)	
Congressional Rail Safety Caucus	Dina Titus (D)	
Congressional ReCommerce Caucus	Sydney Kamlager-Dove (D)	
Congressional ReCommerce Caucus	Nicole Malliotakis (R)	
Congressional Reentry Caucus	Danny Davis (D)	
Congressional Renters Caucus	Jimmy Gomez (D)	
Congressional Research and Development Caucus	Bill Foster (D)	
Congressional Research and Development Caucus	Jim Baird (R)	
Congressional Robotics Caucus	Bob Latta (R)	
Congressional Robotics Caucus	Jay Obernolte (R)	
Congressional Robotics Caucus	Jim McGovern (D)	
Congressional Robotics Caucus	Haley Stevens (D)	
Congressional Rock and Roll Caucus	Shontel Brown (D)	
Congressional Rock and Roll Caucus	David Joyce (R)	
Congressional Rock and Roll Caucus	Bennie Thompson (D)	
Congressional Rock and Roll Caucus	Nicole Malliotakis (R)	
Congressional Rock and Roll Caucus	Shri Thanedar (D)	
Congressional Rock and Roll Caucus	Andrew Garbarino (R)	
Congressional Rotary Wing Caucus	Jen Kiggans (R)	
Congressional Rotary Wing Caucus	Tom Barrett (R)	
Congressional Rural Caucus	Adrian Smith (R)	
Congressional Rural Caucus	Terri Sewell (D)	
Congressional RV Caucus	Rudy Yakym (R)	
Congressional RV Caucus	Dina Titus (D)	
Congressional Rwanda Caucus	Trent Kelly (R)	
Congressional SALT Caucus	Andrew Garbarino (R)	
Congressional SALT Caucus	Josh Gottheimer (D)	
Congressional SALT Caucus	Young Kim (R)	
Congressional SALT Caucus	Tom Suozzi (D)	
Congressional Sarcoidosis Caucus	Josh Gottheimer (D)	
Congressional Sarcoidosis Caucus	Max Miller (R)	
Congressional School Choice Caucus	John Moolenaar (R)	
Congressional Scouting Caucus	Glenn Thompson (R)	
Congressional Scouting Caucus	Sanford Bishop (D)	
Congressional Serbia Caucus	Claudia Tenney (R)	
Congressional Serbia Caucus	Emanuel Cleaver (D)	
Congressional Service Organization Caucus	Glenn Thompson (R)	
Congressional Service Organization Caucus	Jimmy Panetta (D)	
Congressional Sharia-Free America Caucus	Keith Self (R)	
Congressional Sharia-Free America Caucus	Chip Roy (R)	
Congressional Shipbuilding Caucus	Joe Courtney (D)	
Congressional Shipbuilding Caucus	Rob Wittman (R)	
Congressional Shipyard Caucus	Robert Wittman (R)	
Congressional Shipyard Caucus	Ed Case (D)	
Congressional Shipyard Caucus	Emily Randall (D)	
Congressional Sickle Cell Disease Caucus	Glenn Ivey (D)	
Congressional Sickle Cell Disease Caucus	Rich McCormick (R)	
Congressional Singapore Caucus	David Schweikert (R)	
Congressional Singapore Caucus	Rick Larsen	
Congressional Skilled Workforce Caucus	French Hill (R)	
Congressional Skilled Workforce Caucus	Jonathan Jackson (D)	
Congressional Slovak Caucus	Frank Mrvan (D)	
Congressional Slovak Caucus	Marlin Stutzman (R)	
Congressional Slow Fashion Caucus	Chellie Pingree (D)	
Congressional Smart Cities Caucus	Yvette Clarke (D)	
Congressional Smart Cities Caucus	Darrell Issa (R)	
Congressional Sneaker Caucus	Jared Moskowitz (D)	
Congressional Sneaker Caucus	Wesley Hunt (R)	
Congressional Soccer Caucus	Don Bacon (R)	
Congressional Soccer Caucus	Kathy Castor (D)	
Congressional Soccer Caucus	Darin LaHood (R)	
Congressional Soccer Caucus	Rick Larsen (D)	
Congressional Soils Caucus	Brad Finstad (R)	
Congressional Soils Caucus	Jim Costa (D)	
Congressional Songwriters Caucus	Ben Cline (R)	
Congressional Songwriters Caucus	Ted Lieu (D)	
Congressional Sons and Daughters of the American Revolution Caucus	Ryan Mackenzie (R)	
Congressional South Atlantic Red Snapper Task Force	John Rutherford (R)	
Congressional South Atlantic Red Snapper Task Force	Buddy Carter (R)	
Congressional South Atlantic Red Snapper Task Force	Russell Fry (R)	
Congressional South Atlantic Red Snapper Task Force	David Rouzer (R)	
Congressional Space Weather Caucus	Joe Neguse (D)	
Congressional Space Weather Caucus	Jay Obernolte (R)	
Congressional Specialty Crops Caucus	David Valadao (R)	
Congressional Specialty Crops Caucus	Jim Costa (D)	
Congressional Specialty Crops Caucus	David Rouzer (R)	
Congressional Specialty Crops Caucus	Sanford Bishop (D)	
Congressional Spice Caucus	Johnny Olszewski (D)	
Congressional Spice Caucus	Eric Burlison (R)	
Congressional Sportsmen's Caucus	Bruce Westerman (R)	
Congressional Sportsmen's Caucus	Jimmy Panetta (D)	
Congressional STARBASE Caucus	Salud Carbajal (D)	
Congressional STARBASE Caucus	Vince Fong (R)	
Congressional STEAM Caucus	Suzanne Bonamici (D)	
Congressional STEAM Caucus	Mike Carey (R)	
Congressional Steel Caucus	Rick Crawford (R)	
Congressional Steel Caucus	Frank Mrvan (D)	
Congressional STEM Education Caucus	Neal Dunn (R)	
Congressional STEM Education Caucus	Luz Rivas (D)	
Congressional Stop Scams Caucus	Jefferson Shreve (R)	
Congressional Stop Scams Caucus	Gabe Amo (D)	
Congressional Stop Scams Caucus	Jamie Raskin (D)	
Congressional Stop Scams Caucus	Zach Nunn (R)	
Congressional Submarine Caucus	Joe Courtney (D)	
Congressional Submarine Caucus	Rob Wittman (R)	
Congressional Submarine Caucus	Seth Magaziner (D)	
Congressional Submarine Caucus	Bobby Scott (D)	
Congressional Submarine Caucus	Jen Kiggans (R)	
Congressional Submarine Caucus	Scott DesJarlais (R)	
Congressional Supply Chain Caucus	David Rouzer (R)	
Congressional Supply Chain Caucus	Dusty Johnson (R)	
Congressional Supply Chain Caucus	Angie Craig (D)	
Congressional Supply Chain Caucus	Sharice Davids (D)	
Congressional Sustainable Aviation Caucus	Sharice Davids (D)	
Congressional Sustainable Aviation Caucus	Buddy Carter (R)	
Congressional Taiwan Caucus	Mario Díaz-Balart (R)	
Congressional Taiwan Caucus	Andy Barr (R)	
Congressional Taiwan Caucus	Ami Bera (D)	
Congressional Task Force on American Hostages and Americans Wrongfully Detained Abroad	French Hill (R)	
Congressional Task Force on American Hostages and Americans Wrongfully Detained Abroad	Haley Stevens (D)	
Congressional TB Elimination Caucus	Ami Bera (D)	
Congressional TB Elimination Caucus	María Elvira Salazar (R)	
Congressional Teacher Caucus	Jahana Hayes (D)	
Congressional Tennessee Valley Authority (TVA) Caucus	John Rose (R)	
Congressional Tequila Caucus	Salud Carbajal (D)	
Congressional Tequila Caucus	Anna Paulina Luna (R)	
Congressional Territories and Commonwealths Caucus	James Moylan (R)	
Congressional Territories and Commonwealths Caucus	Pablo Hernández Rivera	
Congressional Texas GOP Caucus	Nathaniel Moran (R)	
Congressional Textile Caucus	David Rouzer (R)	
Congressional Textile Caucus	Adriano Espaillat (D)	
Congressional Tire Caucus	Tim Moore (R)	
Congressional Tire Caucus	Emilia Sykes (D)	
Congressional Tobacco Harm Reduction Caucus	Guy Reschenthaler (R)	
Congressional Tobacco Harm Reduction Caucus	Don Davis (D)	
Congressional Tourette Syndrome Caucus	Andrew Garbarino (R)	
Congressional Tourette Syndrome Caucus	Steve Cohen (D)	
Congressional Toy Caucus	Rob Wittman (R)	
Congressional Toy Caucus	Ted Lieu (D)	
Congressional Trademark Caucus	Joe Neguse (D)	
Congressional Trademark Caucus	Ben Cline (R)	
Congressional Transparency Caucus	Mike Quigley (D)	
Congressional Travel and Tourism Caucus	Gus Bilirakis (R)	
Congressional Travel and Tourism Caucus	Dina Titus (D)	
Congressional Trojan Caucus	Young Kim (R)	
Congressional Trojan Caucus	Sydney Kamlager-Dove (D)	
Congressional Trucking Caucus	Dave Taylor (R)	
Congressional Trucking Caucus	Shomari Figures (D)	
Congressional Trucking Caucus	Harriet Hageman (R)	
Congressional Trucking Caucus	Pat Harrigan (R)	
Congressional Trucking Caucus	Vacant	
Congressional Trucking Caucus	Mary Miller (R)	
Congressional U.S.-Foreign Trade Zone Caucus	Aaron Bean (R)	
Congressional U.S.-Foreign Trade Zone Caucus	Marilyn Strickland (D)	
Congressional U.S.-Kazakhstan Caucus	Robert Aderholt (R)	
Congressional U.S.-Kazakhstan Caucus	Jimmy Panetta (D)	
Congressional U.S.-Lebanon Friendship Caucus	Darin LaHood (R)	
Congressional U.S.-Lebanon Friendship Caucus	Darrell Issa (R)	
Congressional U.S.-Lebanon Friendship Caucus	Debbie Dingell (D)	
Congressional U.S.-Mexico Caucus	Joaquin Castro (D)	
Congressional U.S.-Mexico Caucus	Rudy Yakym (R)	
Congressional U.S.-Philippines Friendship Caucus	James Moylan (R)	
Congressional U.S.-Philippines Friendship Caucus	Bobby Scott (D)	
Congressional UK Caucus	Joe Wilson (R)	
Congressional UK Caucus	David Rouzer (R)	
Congressional UK Caucus	Jim Himes (D)	
Congressional UK Caucus	Gabe Amo (D)	
Congressional Ukraine Caucus	Joe Wilson (R)	
Congressional Ukraine Caucus	Marcy Kaptur (D)	
Congressional Ukraine Caucus	Brian Fitzpatrick (R)	
Congressional Ukraine Caucus	Mike Quigley (D)	
Congressional Unexploded Ordnance (UXO)/Demining Caucus	David Valadao (R)	
Congressional Unexploded Ordnance (UXO)/Demining Caucus	Chrissy Houlahan (D)	
Congressional United States Coast Guard Caucus	Salud Carbajal (D)	
Congressional United States Coast Guard Caucus	Brian Mast (R)	
Congressional United States Coast Guard Caucus	Joe Courtney (D)	
Congressional United States Coast Guard Caucus	Trent Kelly (R)	
Congressional Unmanned Systems Caucus	Rudy Yakym (R)	
Congressional Unmanned Systems Caucus	Dina Titus (D)	
Congressional Uyghur Caucus	Tom Suozzi (D)	
Congressional Uyghur Caucus	Chris Smith (R)	
Congressional Uzbekistan Caucus	Trent Kelly (R)	
Congressional Uzbekistan Caucus	Vicente González (D)	
Congressional Veterinary Medicine Caucus	David Rouzer (R)	
Congressional Veterinary Medicine Caucus	Don Davis (D)	
Congressional Victims of Communism Caucus	Debbie Wasserman Schultz (D)	
Congressional Victims of Communism Caucus	Joe Wilson (R)	
Congressional Video Games and Esports Caucus	Stephanie Bice (R)	
Congressional Video Games and Esports Caucus	Jim McGovern (D)	
Congressional Video Games and Esports Caucus	Jay Obernolte (R)	
Congressional Video Games and Esports Caucus	Marc Veasey (D)	
Congressional Voting Rights Caucus	Marc Veasey (D)	
Congressional Voting Rights Caucus	Terri Sewell (D)	
Congressional Voting Rights Caucus	Bobby Scott (D)	
Congressional Voting Rights Caucus	Nikema Williams (D)	
Congressional Western Caucus	Celeste Maloy (R)	
Congressional White Oak Caucus	Andy Barr (R)	
Congressional White Oak Caucus	Steve Cohen (D)	
Congressional White Oak Caucus	Scott DesJarlais (R)	
Congressional White Oak Caucus	Ami Bera (D)	
Congressional Wi-Fi Caucus	Bob Latta (R)	
Congressional Wi-Fi Caucus	Troy Carter (D)	
Congressional Wild Horse Caucus	David Schweikert (R)	
Congressional Wild Horse Caucus	Dina Titus (D)	
Congressional Wild Horse Caucus	Juan Ciscomani (R)	
Congressional Wild Horse Caucus	Steve Cohen (D)	
Congressional Wildlife Refuge Caucus	Mike Thompson (D)	
Congressional Wildlife Refuge Caucus	Gabe Vasquez (R)	
Congressional Wildlife Refuge Caucus	Melanie Stansbury (D)	
Congressional Wildlife Refuge Caucus	Rob Wittman (R)	
Congressional Wine Caucus	Mike Thompson (D)	
Congressional Wine Caucus	Dan Newhouse (R)	
Congressional Wire and Wire Products Caucus	Sam Graves (R)	
Congressional Women in STEM Caucus	Chrissy Houlahan (D)	
Congressional Women in STEM Caucus	Haley Stevens (D)	
Congressional Women in STEM Caucus	Jen Kiggans (R)	
Congressional Women, Peace, and Security (WPS) Caucus	Lois Frankel (D)	
Congressional Women, Peace, and Security (WPS) Caucus	Jen Kiggans (R)	
Congressional Women's High Tech Caucus	Suzan DelBene (D)	
Congressional Women's High Tech Caucus	Kat Cammack (R)	
Congressional Working Dog Caucus	Jen Kiggans (R)	
Congressional Working Dog Caucus	Don Davis (D)	
Congressional Working Forests Caucus	Bruce Westerman (R)	
Congressional Working Forests Caucus	Sanford Bishop (D)	
Congressional Working Forests Caucus	Kat Cammack (R)	
Congressional Working Forests Caucus	Marie Gluesenkamp Perez (D)	
Congressional Youth ChalleNGe Caucus	Salud Carbajal (D)	
Congressional Youth ChalleNGe Caucus	Brett Guthrie (R)	
Congressional Youth ChalleNGe Caucus	Carol Miller (R)	
Congressional Youth ChalleNGe Caucus	Emily Randall (D)	
Congressional Zoo and Aquarium Caucus	Andrew Garbarino (R)	
Congressional Zoo and Aquarium Caucus	Mike Quigley (D)	
Construction Procurement Caucus	Pete Stauber (R)	
Construction Procurement Caucus	Hillary Scholten (D)	
Counter-Kleptocracy Caucus	Joe Wilson (R)	
Counter-Kleptocracy Caucus	Steve Cohen (D)	
Counter-Kleptocracy Caucus	María Elvira Salazar (R)	
Counter-Kleptocracy Caucus	Bill Keating (D)	
Craft Spirits Caucus	Hillary Scholten (D)	
Craft Spirits Caucus	Jeff Hurd (R)	
Creative Rights Caucus	Judy Chu (D)	
Creative Rights Caucus	Laurel Lee (R)	
Crime Survivors and Justice Caucus	Jim Costa (D)	
Crime Survivors and Justice Caucus	Juan Ciscomani (R)	
D
CMO	Chair(s)	
Delaware River Watershed Caucus	Brian Fitzpatrick (R)	
Delaware River Watershed Caucus	Josh Riley (D)	
Delivering Outstanding Government Efficiency (DOGE) Caucus	Aaron Bean (R)	
Delivering Outstanding Government Efficiency (DOGE) Caucus	Pete Sessions (R)	
Delivering Outstanding Government Efficiency (DOGE) Caucus	Blake Moore (R)	
Democratic Veterans Caucus	Pat Ryan (D)	
Democratic Veterans Caucus	Chris Deluzio (D)	
Democratic Veterans Caucus	Ted Lieu (D)	
Democratic Women's Caucus	Teresa Leger Fernández (D)	
Digital Trades Caucus	Darin LaHood (R)	
Digital Trades Caucus	Suzan DelBene (D)	
E
CMO	Chair(s)	
Election Integrity Caucus	Claudia Tenney (R)	
European Union Caucus	Joe Wilson (R)	
European Union Caucus	Brendan Boyle (D)	
F
CMO	Chair(s)	
Financial Security Caucus	Randy Feenstra (R)	
Financial Security Caucus	Bill Huizenga (R)	
Financial Security Caucus	Tim Walberg (R)	
Financial Security Caucus	John Larson (D)	
Florida Ports Caucus	Frederica Wilson (D)	
Florida Ports Caucus	Mike Haridopolos (R)	
Food Allergy Research Caucus	Doris Matsui (D)	
Food Allergy Research Caucus	Ben Cline (R)	
Food Allergy Research Caucus	Ro Khanna (D)	
Food Allergy Research Caucus	Glenn Grothman (R)	
For Country Caucus	Jake Ellzey (R)	
For Country Caucus	Don Davis (D)	
Friends of a Free, Stable, and Democratic Syria Caucus	Brendan Boyle (D)	
Friends of a Free, Stable, and Democratic Syria Caucus	French Hill (R)	
Friends of Belarus Caucus	Joe Wilson (R)	
Friends of Belarus Caucus	Bill Keating (D)	
Friends of Belarus Caucus	Chris Smith (R)	
Friends of Belarus Caucus	Marcy Kaptur (D)	
Friends of Judea and Sameria Caucus	Claudia Tenney (R)	
Friends of Scotland Caucus	Robert Aderholt (R)	
Friends of Scotland Caucus	Steve Cohen (D)	
G
CMO	Chair(s)	
Garifuna Caucus	Ritchie Torres (D)	
Get the Lead Out Caucus	Rashida Tlaib (D)	
Get the Lead Out Caucus	Debbie Dingell (D)	
Global Partners of Texas Caucus (GPTC)	Pat Fallon (R)	
Global Partners of Texas Caucus (GPTC)	Marc Veasey (D)	
GOP Women's Caucus	Kat Cammack (R)	
Great Lakes Task Force	David Joyce (R)	
Great Lakes Task Force	Marcy Kaptur (D)	
Great Lakes Task Force	Bill Huizenga (R)	
Great Lakes Task Force	Debbie Dingell (D)	
H
CMO	Chair(s)	
Head Start to Congress Caucus	Teresa Leger Fernández (D)	
Hearing Health Caucus	Mike Thompson (D)	
Hearing Health Caucus	Tom Barrett (R)	
Hip Hop Congressional Caucus	André Carson (D)	
Hip Hop Congressional Caucus	Hank Johnson (D)	
Hip Hop Congressional Caucus	Delia Ramirez (D)	
Historic Preservation Caucus	Mike Turner (R)	
Historic Preservation Caucus	Teresa Leger Fernández (D)	
Historic Preservation Caucus	Mike Carey (R)	
Historic Preservation Caucus	Seth Magaziner (D)	
House Advanced Nuclear Caucus	Chuck Fleischmann (R)	
House Advanced Nuclear Caucus	Bill Foster (D)	
House Aerospace Caucus	Ron Estes (R)	
House Aerospace Caucus	Salud Carbajal (D)	
House Bipartisan Task Force for Combatting Antisemitism	Dan Goldman (D)	
House Bipartisan Task Force for Combatting Antisemitism	Chris Smith (R)	
House Defense Modernization Caucus	Pat Ryan (D)	
House Defense Modernization Caucus	Rob Wittman (R)	
House Golden Dome Caucus	Jeff Crank (R)	
House Northern Border Security Caucus	Mike Kelly (R)	
House Northern Border Security Caucus	Ryan Zinke (R)	
House Nuclear Triad Caucus	Julie Fedorchak (R)	
House Nuclear Triad Caucus	Emily Randall (D)	
House Oceans Caucus	Suzanne Bonamici (D)	
House Oceans Caucus	Buddy Carter (R)	
House of Representatives Cancer Caucus	Brian Fitzpatrick (R)	
House of Representatives Cancer Caucus	Debbie Wasserman Schultz (D)	
House of Representatives Cancer Caucus	Mike Kelly (R)	
House of Representatives Cancer Caucus	Debbie Dingell (D)	
House of Representatives Children's Safety Caucus	Debbie Wasserman Schultz (D)	
House of Representatives Children's Safety Caucus	Buddy Carter (R)	
House of Representatives Children's Safety Caucus	Raja Krishnamoorthi (D)	
House of Representatives Children's Safety Caucus	Don Bacon (R)	
House Organic Caucus	Chellie Pingree (D)	
House Organic Caucus	Dan Newhouse (R)	
House Organic Caucus	Jimmy Panetta (D)	
House Organic Caucus	Tony Wied (R)	
House Public Works and Infrastructure Caucus	Jeff Van Drew (R)	
House Public Works and Infrastructure Caucus	Dina Titus (D)	
House Recycling Caucus	Haley Stevens (D)	
House Recycling Caucus	David Joyce (R)	
House Recycling Caucus	Chellie Pingree (D)	
House Recycling Caucus	Mariannette Miller-Meeks (R)	
House Republican Israel Caucus	Joe Wilson (R)	
House Republican Israel Caucus	David Kustoff (R)	
House Republican Israel Caucus	Brian Jack (R)	
I
CMO	Chair(s)	
Internet Caucus	Michael McCaul (R)	
Internet Caucus	Haley Stevens (D)	
Invasive Species Caucus	Mike Thompson (D)	
Invasive Species Caucus	Elise Stefanik (R)	
Iranian Women Congressional Caucus	Nancy Mace (R)	
Iranian Women Congressional Caucus	Zoe Lofgren (D)	
Italian American Congressional Delegation	Michael Rulli (R)	
Italian American Congressional Delegation	Rosa DeLauro (D)	
L
CMO	Chair(s)	
Long Range Strike Caucus	Mark Alford (R)	
Long Range Strike Caucus	Don Davis (D)	
Lyme and Tick-Borne Disease Caucus	Chris Smith (R)	
Lyme and Tick-Borne Disease Caucus	Lloyd Doggett (D)	
M
CMO	Chair(s)	
Make America Healthy Again Caucus	David Joyce (R)	
Make America Healthy Again Caucus	Lloyd Smucker (R)	
Malaria and Neglected Tropical Diseases Caucus	Ami Bera (D)	
Malaria and Neglected Tropical Diseases Caucus	Chris Smith (R)	
Merit Caucus	Burgess Owens (R)	
Military Depot and Industrial Facilities Caucus	Blake Moore (R)	
Military Depot and Industrial Facilities Caucus	Eric Sorensen (R)	
Military Veterans Caucus	Jack Bergman (R)	
Military Veterans Caucus	Mike Thompson (D)	
Military Veterans Caucus	Gus Bilirakis (R)	
Military Veterans Caucus	Chrissy Houlahan (D)	
Missile Defense Caucus	Scott DesJarlais (R)	
Missile Defense Caucus	Donald Norcross (D)	
Mitochondrial Disease Caucus	Brian Fitzpatrick (R)	
Mitochondrial Disease Caucus	Jim McGovern (D)	
Modern Agriculture Caucus	Adrian Smith (R)	
N
CMO	Chair(s)	
National Heritage Area Caucus	Glenn Thompson (R)	
National Heritage Area Caucus	Paul Tonko (D)	
National Marine Sanctuaries Caucus	Jared Huffman (D)	
National Marine Sanctuaries Caucus	Jack Bergman (R)	
Natural Disaster Caucus	Mike Thompson (D)	
Natural Disaster Caucus	Greg Steube (R)	
New Democrat Coalition	Brad Schneider (D)	
Northern Border Caucus	Timothy Kennedy (D)	
Northern Border Caucus	Bill Huizenga (R)	
P
CMO	Chair(s)	
People's Environmental Justice Caucus	Summer Lee (D)	
People's Environmental Justice Caucus	Rashida Tlaib (D)	
Personalized Medicine Caucus	John Moolenaar (R)	
Personalized Medicine Caucus	Kevin Mullin (D)	
Pragmatic Solutions Caucus	Sharice Davids (D)	
Protein Innovation Caucus	Julia Brownley (D)	
Protein Innovation Caucus	Ted Lieu (D)	
Protein Innovation Caucus	David Schweikert (R)	
Protein Innovation Caucus	Rob Wittman (R)	
Public Broadcasting Caucus	Mark Amodei (R)	
Public Broadcasting Caucus	Dan Goldman (D)	
Public Service Loan Forgiveness (PSLF) Caucus	Brendan Boyle (D)	
Public Service Loan Forgiveness (PSLF) Caucus	David Joyce (R)	
Public Shipyard Caucus	Rob Wittman (R)	
Public Shipyard Caucus	Ed Case (D)	
Q
CMO	Chair(s)	
Quiet Skies Caucus	Eleanor Holmes Norton (D)	
Quiet Skies Caucus	Stephen Lynch (D)	
R
CMO	Chair(s)	
Rare Disease Caucus	Gus Bilirakis (R)	
Rare Disease Caucus	Doris Matsui (D)	
Rare Disease Caucus	Sen. Amy Klobuchar (D)	
Rare Disease Caucus	Sen. Roger Wicker (R)	
Republican Main Street Caucus	Mike Flood (R)	
Republican Study Committee	August Pfluger (R)	
Romania Caucus	Mike Turner (R)	
Romania Caucus	Tom Suozzi (D)	
S
CMO	Chair(s)	
Semiconductor Caucus	Michael McCaul (R)	
Semiconductor Caucus	Zoe Lofgren (D)	
Servicewomen and Women Veterans Congressional Caucus	Chrissy Houlahan (D)	
Servicewomen and Women Veterans Congressional Caucus	Maggie Goodlander (D)	
Shellfish Caucus	Mike Thompson (D)	
Shellfish Caucus	Rob Wittman (R)	
Shellfish Caucus	John Larson (D)	
Shellfish Caucus	Mike Ezell (R)	
Special Operations Forces Caucus	Richard Hudson (R)	
Special Operations Forces Caucus	Scott Peters (D)	
Special Operations Forces Caucus	Ronny Jackson (R)	
Special Operations Forces Caucus	Kathy Castor (D)	
Spent Nuclear Fuel Solutions Caucus	Chuck Fleischmann (R)	
Spent Nuclear Fuel Solutions Caucus	Mike Levin (D)	
Sri Lanka Caucus	Robert Aderholt (R)	
Sri Lanka Caucus	Hank Johnson (D)	
Sri Lanka Caucus	Dina Titus (D)	
Stakeholder Capitalism Caucus	Chrissy Houlahan (D)	
Stakeholder Capitalism Caucus	Seth Magaziner (D)	
Sustainable Energy and Environment Coalition	Doris Matsui (D)	
Sustainable Energy and Environment Coalition	Mike Quigley (D)	
Sustainable Energy and Environment Coalition	Paul Tonko (D)	
Sustainable Investment Caucus	Sean Casten (D)	
Sustainable Investment Caucus	Juan Vargas (D)	
T
CMO	Chair(s)	
Tennessee Valley Corridor Caucus	Chuck Fleischmann (R)	
Tennessee Valley Corridor Caucus	Mike Rogers (R)	
U
CMO	Chair(s)	
Unidentified Anomalous Phenomena Caucus	Tim Burchett (R)	
Unidentified Anomalous Phenomena Caucus	Scott Peters (D)	
U.S.-Africa Policy Working Group	Ilhan Omar (D)	
U.S.-China Working Group	Darin LaHood (R)	
U.S.-China Working Group	Rick Larsen (D)	
U.S.-Japan Caucus	Adrian Smith (R)	
U.S.-Japan Caucus	Joaquin Castro (D)	
U.S.-Thai Alliance Caucus	Joe Wilson (R)	
U.S.-Thai Alliance Caucus	Scott Peters (D)	
United Service Organizations (USO) Caucus	Mike Rogers (R)	
United Service Organizations (USO) Caucus	Adam Smith (D)	
V
CMO	Chair(s)	
Values Action Team	Robert Aderholt (R)	
Values Action Team	Mary Miller (R)	
Values Action Team	Josh Brecheen (R)	
W
CMO	Chair(s)	
Weather Enterprise Caucus	Mike Flood (R)	
Weather Enterprise Caucus	Eric Sorensen (D)	

Contents A • B • C • D • E • F • G • H • I • L • M • N • P • Q • R • S • T • U • V • W • Y

== Congressional Staff Organizations (CSOs) ==
CSO	Members
Black Republican Staff Association	Sponsor: Trent Kelly (R)
Congressional Asian Pacific American Staff Association	Sponsors: Mark Takano (D)
Congressional Asian Pacific American Staff Association	Mazie Hirono (D)
Congressional Black Associates Staff Association	Sponsor: Terri Sewell (D)
Congressional Catholic Staff Association	Sponsor: Pete Stauber (R)
Congressional Service Members and Veterans Staff Association	Sponsors: Chrissy Houlahan (D)
Congressional Service Members and Veterans Staff Association	Don Bacon (R)
Congressional Staff Association on Artificial Intelligence (CSA.ai)	Sponsors: Mark Green (R)
Congressional Staff Association on Artificial Intelligence (CSA.ai)	Ted Lieu (D)
Congressional Staff Association on Artificial Intelligence (CSA.ai)	Donald Beyer (D)
Congressional Staff Association on Artificial Intelligence (CSA.ai)	Zach Nunn (R)
Congressional Technology Staff Association	Sponsor: Suzan DelBene (D)
Trade and Tax Staff Association	Sponsors: Randy Feenstra (R)
Trade and Tax Staff Association	Brendan Boyle (D)
Counter Kleptocracy Study Group	Sponsors: Joe Wilson (R)
Counter Kleptocracy Study Group	Steve Cohen (D)
Counter Kleptocracy Study Group	Sponsors: Keith Self (R)
Counter Kleptocracy Study Group	Stephanie Bice (R)
Counter Kleptocracy Study Group	Nathaniel Moran (R)
Counter Kleptocracy Study Group	Cliff Bentz (R)
House Chiefs of Staff Association	Sponsors: Jason Crow (D)
House Chiefs of Staff Association	Lisa McClain (R)
Italian American Congressional Staff Association	Sponsors: Bill Keating (D)
Italian American Congressional Staff Association	Brendan Boyle (D)
Italian American Congressional Staff Association	Jeff Hurd (R)
Latter-day Saints Staff Association	Sponsor: Blake Moore (R)
Lesbian, Gay, Bisexual and Transgender (LGBT) Staff Association	Sponsors: Gwen Moore (D)
Lesbian, Gay, Bisexual and Transgender (LGBT) Staff Association	Jennifer McClellan (D)
Lesbian, Gay, Bisexual and Transgender (LGBT) Staff Association	Mike Levin (D)
Lesbian, Gay, Bisexual and Transgender (LGBT) Staff Association	Angie Craig (D)
Lesbian, Gay, Bisexual and Transgender (LGBT) Staff Association	Summer Lee (D)
Marquette University Alumni Staff Association (MUASA)	Sponsors: Jeff Hurd (R)
Marquette University Alumni Staff Association (MUASA)	Rob Bresnahan (R)
Marquette University Alumni Staff Association (MUASA)	Tammy Baldwin (D)
Middle Eastern and North African (MENA) Staff Association	Sponsors: Deborah Ross (D)
Middle Eastern and North African (MENA) Staff Association	Greg Steube (R)
Middle Eastern and North African (MENA) Staff Association	Lisa McClain (R)
Middle Eastern and North African (MENA) Staff Association	Johnny Olszewski (D)
Middle Eastern and North African (MENA) Staff Association	Chief Administrative Officer
Middle Eastern and North African (MENA) Staff Association	Chuck Schumer (D)
Middle Eastern and North African (MENA) Staff Association	Raphael Warnock (D)
National Security Staff Association	Sponsors: Pat Fallon (R)
National Security Staff Association	Brad Sherman (D)
Republican Asian Staff Association	Sponsors: Rich McCormick (R)
Republican Asian Staff Association	Jeff Hurd (R)
Space Advocates Staff Association	Sponsor: Daniel Webster (R)
Syrian-American Congressional Staff Association	Sponsor: Joe Wilson (R)
Women's Congressional Staff Association	Sponsors: Kat Cammack (R)
Women's Congressional Staff Association	Lois Frankel (D)

== See also ==
- Congressional Research Service
- Committee on House Administration
