= Congressional Czech Caucus =

Congressional Czech Caucus was inaugurated on February 27, 2008, in Washington, D.C.

== Members of the Czech Congressional Caucus ==
=== US Senate ===
(List in progress, March 4, 2008)

==== Chairmen ====
- Senator E. Benjamin Nelson (Nebraska) Democrat
- Senator George V. Voinovich (Ohio) Republican

==== Members ====
- Senator Robert P. Casey, Jr. (Pennsylvania) Democrat
- Senator Byron Dorgan (North Dakota) Democrat
- Senator Dianne Feinstein (California) Democrat
- Senator Chuck Grassley (Iowa) Republican
- Senator Joseph Lieberman (Connecticut) Independent
- Senator Mel Martinez (Florida) Republican
- Senator Ted Stevens (Alaska) Republican

=== US House of Representatives ===
(List in progress, April 10, 2008)

==== Chairmen ====
- Congressman Joe Barton (TX-6) Republican
- Congressman Daniel Lipinski (IL-3) Democrat
- Congressman Thaddeus G. McCotter (MI-11) Republican
- Congresswoman Ellen Tauscher (CA-10) Democrat

==== Members ====
- Rod Blum (IA-1)
- Joe Bonner (AL-1)
- Michael Conaway (TX-11)
- Danny K. Davis (IL-7)
- Lincoln Díaz-Balart (FL-21)
- Mario Díaz-Balart (FL-25)
- Lloyd Doggett (TX-25)
- Phil English (PA-3)
- Jeff Fortenberry (NE-1)
- Sheila Jackson Lee (TX-18)
- Dave Loebsack (IA-2)
- Don Manzullo (IL-16)
- Harry Mitchell (AZ-5)
- Solomon Ortiz (TX-27)
- Jan Schakowsky (IL-9)
- Joe Sestak (PA-7)
- John Shimkus (IL-19)
- Mike Turner (OH-3)

== See also ==
- Caucuses of the United States Congress
