= Danny Davis (Illinois politician) =

American politician (born 1941)

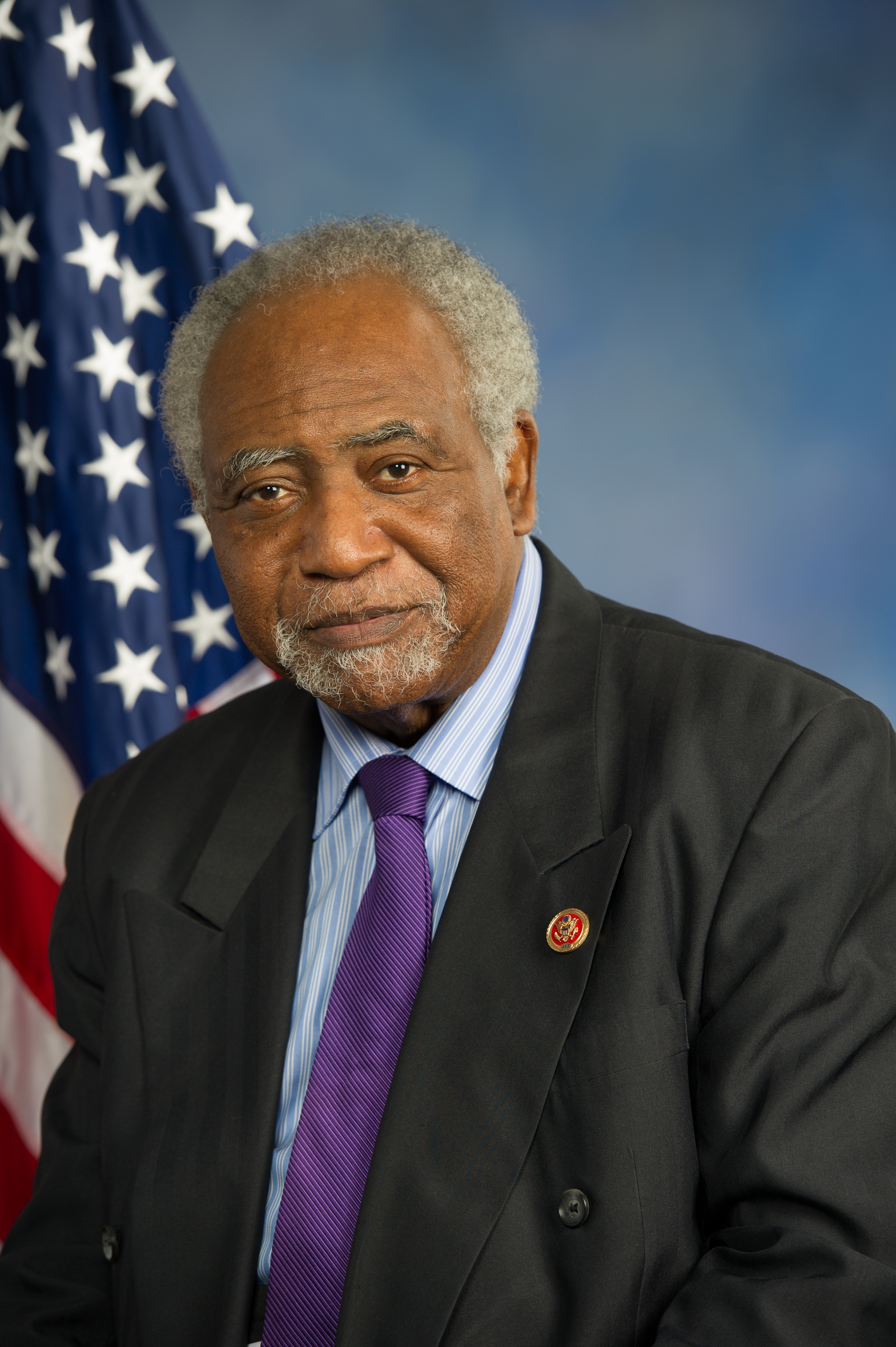
- Official portrait, 2013

Member of the U.S. House of Representatives from Illinois's 7th district
- Incumbent
- Assumed office January 3, 1997
- Preceded by: Cardiss Collins

Member of the Cook County Board of Commissioners
- In office December 20, 1990 – January 3, 1997
- Preceded by: Multi–member district
- Succeeded by: Darlena Williams-Burnett
- Constituency: Chicago at-large (1990–1994); 1st district (1994–1997)

Member of the Chicago City Council from the 29th Ward
- In office April 16, 1979 – December 20, 1990
- Preceded by: Leroy Cross
- Succeeded by: Sam Burrell

Personal details
- Born: September 6, 1941 (age 85) Parkdale, Arkansas, U.S.
- Party: Democratic
- Spouse: Vera Davis (m. 1974)
- Children: 2
- Education: University of Arkansas, Pine Bluff (BA); Chicago State University (MS); Union Institute and University (PhD)
- Website: House website Campaign website
- Davis's voice Davis on the enactment of Medicare and Medicaid. Recorded July 29, 2009

Daniel K. Davis (born September 6, 1941) is an American politician serving as the U.S. representative for Illinois's 7th congressional district since 1997. The district includes much of western Chicago, as well as the Loop. It also encompasses several of Chicago's inner western suburbs, such as Bellwood, Oak Park, and River Forest. Davis is a Democrat, a member of the Congressional Black Caucus, and a former member of the Democratic Socialists of America (DSA). Davis earlier served as a member of the Chicago City Council (1979–1990) and Cook County Board of Commissioners (1990–1997), and unsuccessfully ran in the Democratic primary for mayor of Chicago in 1991.

On July 31, 2025, Davis announced he will not seek reelection to Congress in 2026.

== Early life, education, and career ==
Davis was born in Parkdale, Arkansas, and educated at Arkansas Agricultural, Mechanical and Normal College (now the University of Arkansas at Pine Bluff; B.A. in history, 1961), Chicago State University (M.S. in guidance, 1968), and the Union Institute & University in Cincinnati, Ohio (Ph.D. in public administration, 1977).

Davis worked as a government clerk, a high school teacher, executive director of the Greater Lawndale Conservation Commission, director of training at the Martin L. King Neighborhood Health Center, and executive director of the Westside Health Center before entering politics. He represented Chicago's 29th Ward on the Chicago City Council from 1979 to 1990.

Davis challenged U.S. Representative Cardiss Collins in Democratic primaries in 1984 and 1986, but lost both races. In 1990, he unsuccessfully challenged incumbent Edward J. Rosewell for the Democratic nomination for Cook County Treasurer. Also in 1990, Davis was elected to the Cook County Board of Commissioners, serving from 1990 to 1996 before entering the House. Davis had also waged an unsuccessful campaign against Chicago Mayor Richard M. Daley in the 1991 Democratic mayoral primary.

=== Cook County Board of Commissioners ===
Davis was elected to the Cook County Board of Commissioners from Chicago at-large in 1990. When the board transitioned to district elections in 1994, he was elected to its 1st district.

Entering Congress in 1997, Davis left the Cook County Board of Commissioners. He desired to see Illinois State Senator Earlean Collins appointed his successor on the board, but party leaders instead chose Darlena Williams-Burnett, executive assistant of Jesse White and the wife of alderman Walter Burnett Jr. Collins challenged and unseated Williams-Burnett in the Democratic primary for the seat in 1998.

== U.S. House of Representatives ==
=== Elections ===
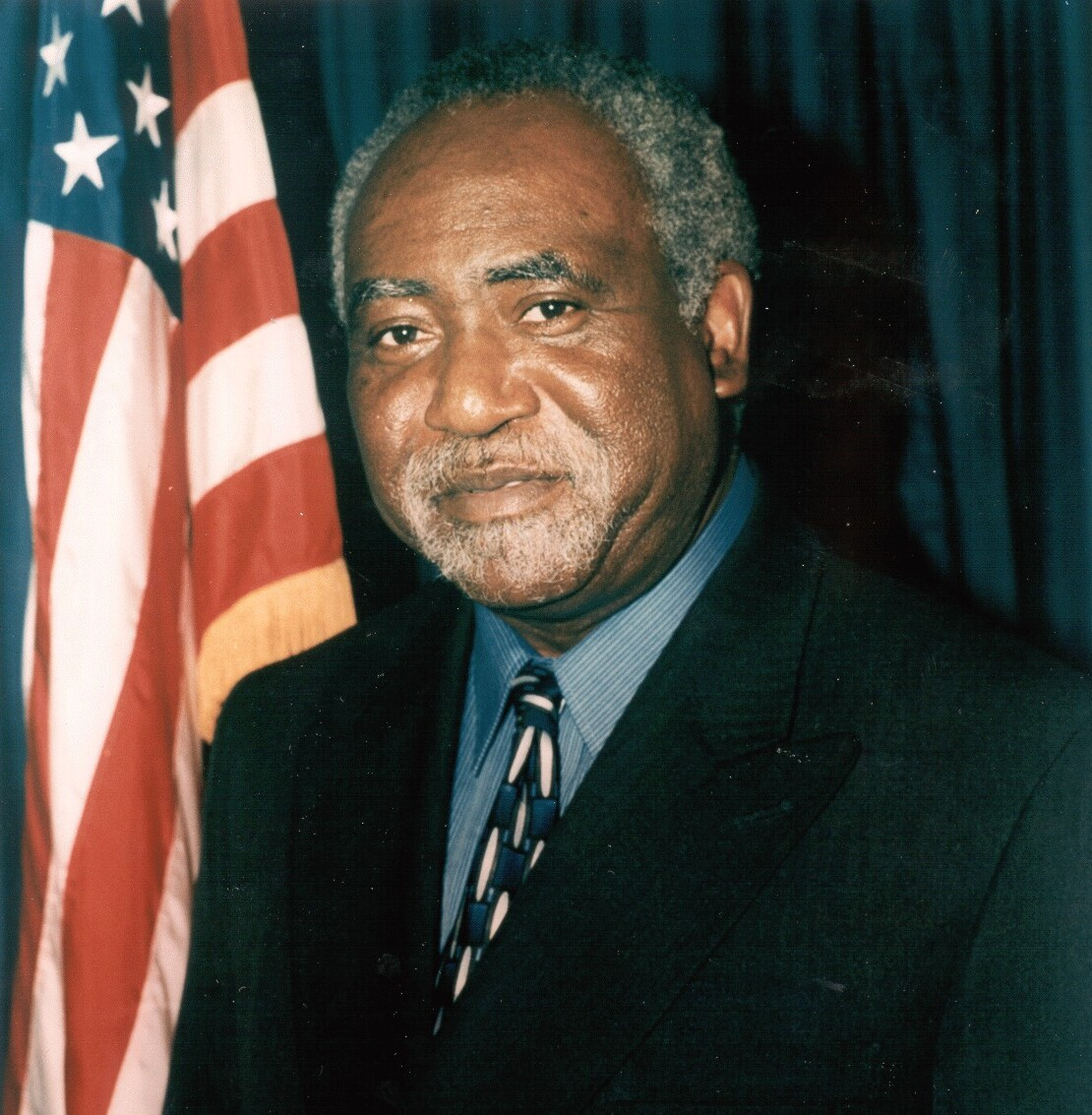
Davis during the 105th Congress

On December 6, 1995, Davis announced his candidacy for the 7th congressional district, adding his name to the already announced Democratic candidates, including Alderman Percy Z. Giles, Cook County Board of Commissioners member Bobbie L. Steele, Alderman Ed Smith, and Alderman Dorothy Tillman. Five other Democratic candidates entered the race later: S. Mendenhall, Joan Sullivan, G. Winbush, Anthony Travis, and Joan Powell, making it the largest field of candidates for U.S. Congress in Illinois in 1996. Davis lived a block outside the district, but was familiar in it.

Davis ran on a progressive Democratic platform popular in the district. He was pro-choice and supported gay rights, the ERA, single-payer health care, and some federal support for child nutrition and care.

In early January 1996, the FBI revealed its Operation Silver Shovel, which included an investigation into Alderman Giles. What Operation Silver Shovel may have done to undermine Giles's chances for election are unclear as he was already lagging with a mere 3% among likely Democratic primary voters in a mid-December poll compared to Davis's 33%, Smith's 8%, Tillman's 7%, and Steele's 6%. But Giles did have Mayor Richard M. Daley's support and that of other well-known area figures—some of whom continued their support during the controversy.

On March 10, 1996, during a radio debate hosted by WMAQ-AM, Tillman and Smith called for Davis to reject the endorsement of former alderman candidate Wallace "Gator" Bradley, spokesman for convicted Gangster Disciples leader Larry Hoover. "Why do you keep badgering me with this question?" Davis replied. "You got a problem with something? You're not going to catch me going around saying I hate Gator Bradley. ... I'm not in the business of disavowing individuals. The good Lord said he hated sin, but not sinners. I'm not hating Gator Bradley. I disagree with those who commit crime and those who'd use drugs, but you won't catch me going around saying that I hate Gator Bradley." Davis never rejected Bradley's endorsement during the campaign, and after winning the primary claimed that Bradley's endorsement played no role in the outcome, though Bradley asserted the contrary.

During the campaign, Tillman highlighted comments Davis made in an August 1970 issue of Ebony: "[T]he white female often gives the black man certain kinds of recognition that the black woman often does not give him." The Davis campaign countered that Davis was speaking as a psychologist in his role as a training director at a health center.

Although Davis was fully promoted as a Democratic candidate, he also ran as a New Party candidate. Supporting this was New Party's celebration of him as the "first New Party member elected to the U.S. Congress." Although the State of Illinois did not permit fusion voting, New Party advocated it as a means to promote itself and its agenda and to project New Party ideology into the Democratic Party. Candidates were called "N[ew]P[arty] Democrats" and required to sign a contract mandating a "visible and active relationship" with New Party. During this time, New Party was experiencing substantial growth. Davis was also endorsed by the Chicago Democratic Socialists of America (CDSA), of which he had been a member since before his congressional run. ACORN, AFL–CIO, Sierra Club, and the International Brotherhood of Teamsters also endorsed Davis.

In the March 20 Democratic primary, Davis received more votes than the two closest candidates, Tillman and Smith, combined. The first five announced candidates all received more than twice as many votes as the five late-entering candidates, with none of the latter receiving more than 2,700.

In the November 5 general election, Davis defeated Republican Randy Borow and third-party candidates Chauncey L. Stroud (Independent), Toietta Dixon (Libertarian), and Charles A. Winter (Natural Law) with over 82% of the vote.

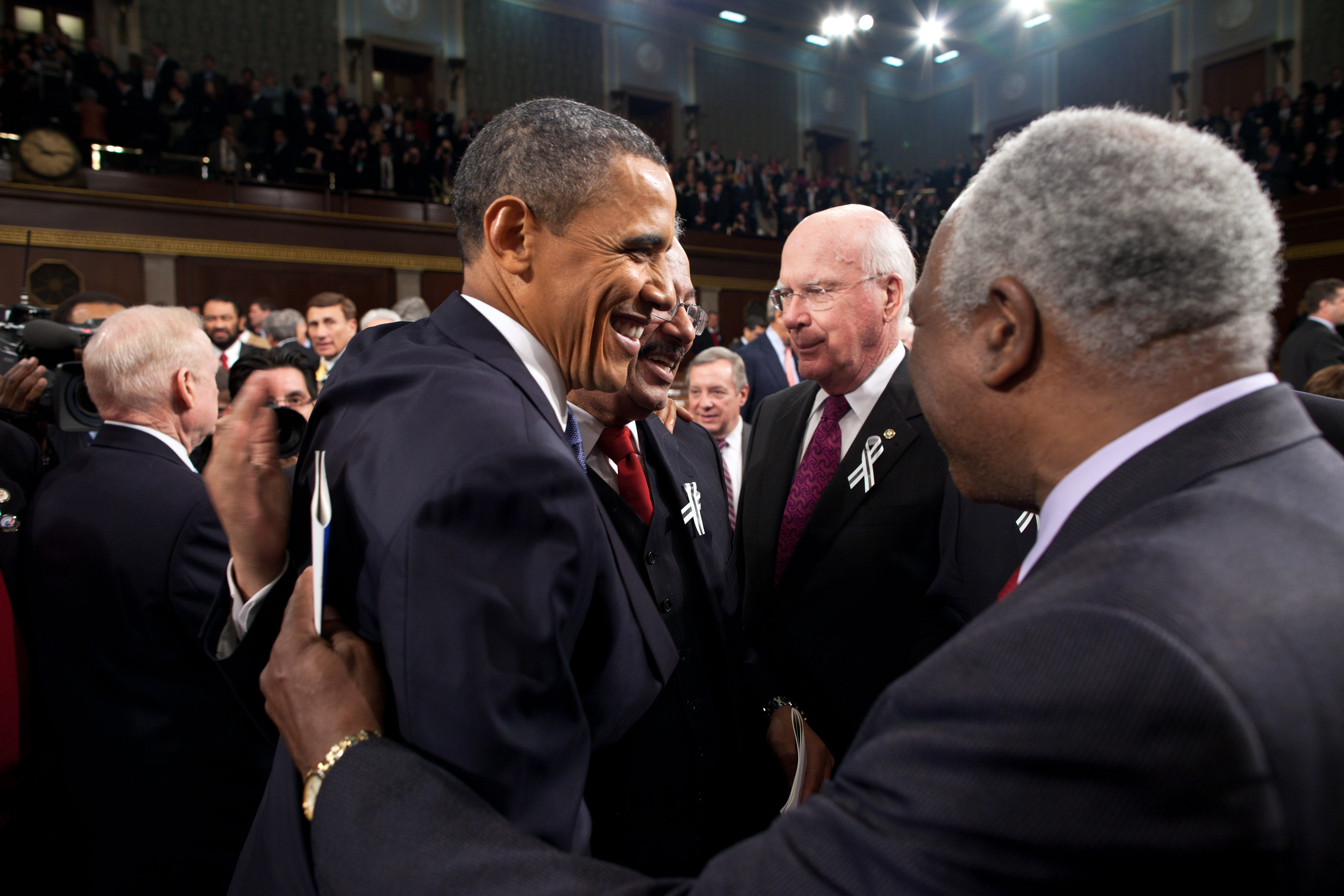
Davis with President Barack Obama in January 2011

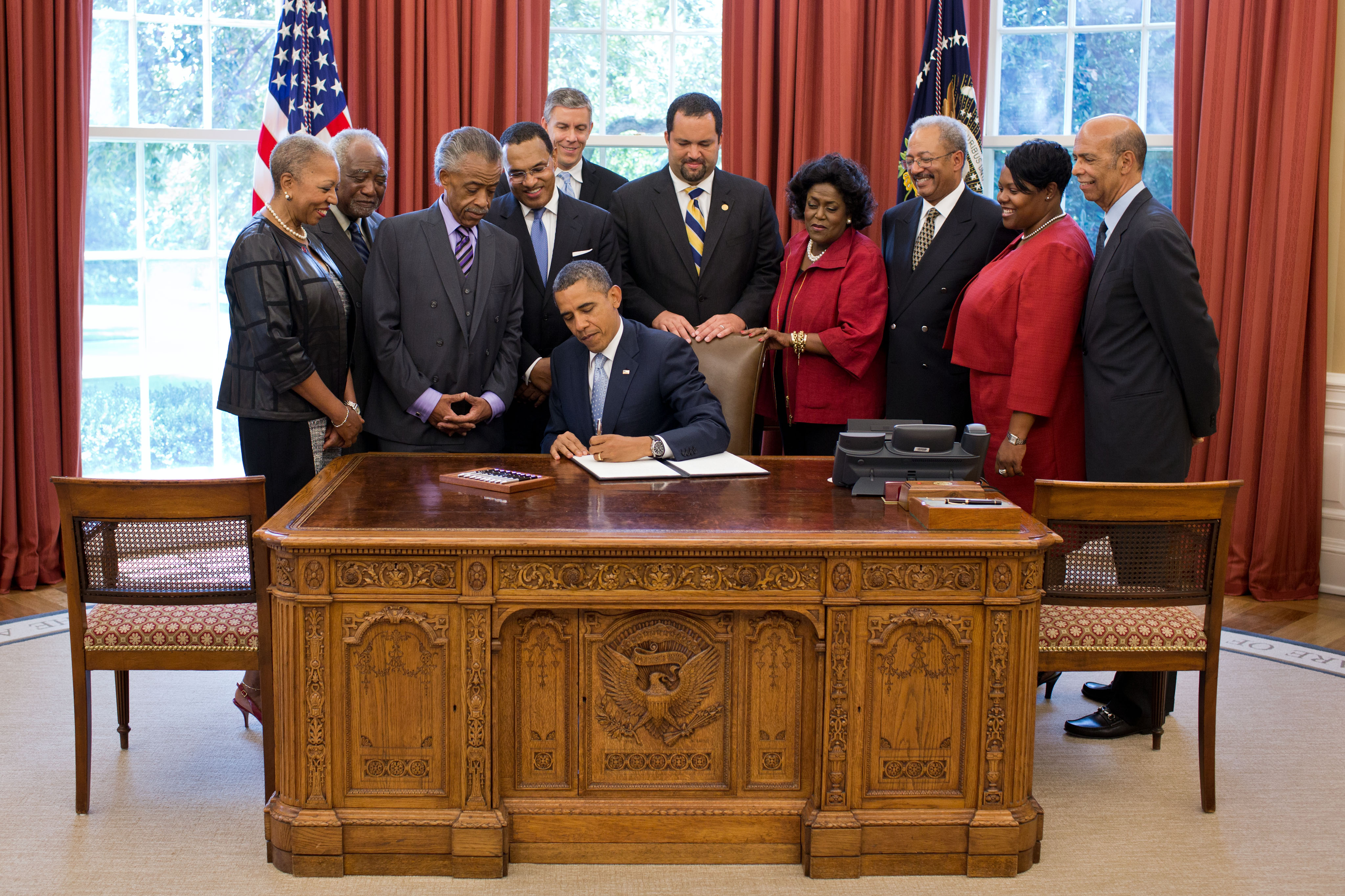
Davis watches as President Obama signs an executive order on July 26, 2012

=== Tenure ===
Davis expressed interest in replacing John Stroger on the ballot in the 2006 race for President of the Cook County Board. Stroger's son Todd Stroger was ultimately selected.

In late 2008, Davis expressed interest in being President Barack Obama's replacement in the U.S. Senate before Illinois Governor Rod Blagojevich's scandal erupted. In a December 31, 2008, New York Times article, Davis said that he turned down an offer from Blagojevich's representatives to appoint him to the Senate. Instead, Blagojevich appointed Roland Burris.

Davis ran for mayor of Chicago a second time in 2011, but withdrew before the election and endorsed Carol Moseley Braun.

In the 2020 Democratic Party presidential primaries, Davis endorsed Kamala Harris. He later endorsed Joe Biden ahead of the Iowa caucus.

==== Sun Myung Moon ====
In 2004, Davis was met with national controversy when he crowned Reverend Sun Myung Moon in a religious ceremony at the Dirksen Senate Office Building honoring Moon. Moon declared himself the Messiah at the crowning ceremony, in which Davis appeared on the invitation as a sponsoring co-chair. Davis wore white gloves and carried the crown on a pillow to crown Moon and his wife "the King and Queen of Peace." Davis told Christian Challenge that Moon's declaring himself the Messiah "was similar to a baseball team owner telling team members that 'we are the greatest team on earth'" before a game. Davis said the peace awards were to "recognize people for promoting peace. Of course the highest recognition goes to the highest promoter and the highest promoter is Reverend Moon, so they come up with something higher than the certificates and plaques that other folks get." Other lawmakers who attended included Senator Mark Dayton, Representatives Roscoe Bartlett and Elijah Cummings, and former Representative Walter Fauntroy. Key organizers of the event included George Augustus Stallings, Jr., a controversial former Catholic priest who had been married by Moon, and Michael Jenkins, the president of the Unification Church of the United States at that time.

==== Trip paid for by Tamil Tigers ====
As the 15th most prolific traveler in Congress, Davis stirred up controversy by accepting a trip to Sri Lanka in 2005 on behalf of the Tamil minority there, paid for by the Tamil Tigers, a group that the U.S. government has designated as a terrorist organization for its use of suicide bombers and child soldiers. Davis said that he was unaware that the Tigers were the source of the trip's funding.

==== Relationship with Louis Farrakhan ====
Davis has said that Louis Farrakhan, the leader of the Nation of Islam who has attracted considerable controversy for his anti-Semitic and homophobic remarks, is an "outstanding human being" and that "I personally know him, I've been to his home, done meetings, participated in events with him." In March 2018, Davis said: "The world is so much bigger than Farrakhan and the Jewish question and his position on that and so forth. For those heavy into it, that's their thing, but it ain't my thing." Davis condemned Farrakhan's views later that month, saying, "So let me be clear: I reject, condemn and oppose Minister Farrakhan's views and remarks regarding the Jewish people and the Jewish religion." He attended Farrakhan's Million Man March and was the only member of Congress to address the 20th anniversary of it.

=== Committee assignments ===
For the 119th Congress:

- Committee on Ways and Means
  - Subcommittee on Health
  - Subcommittee on Work and Welfare (Ranking Member)

=== Party leadership and caucus membership ===
- Black Maternal Health Caucus
- Congressional Equality Caucus
- Congressional Ukraine Caucus
- Regional Whip
- Chair of the Congressional Postal Caucus
- Caucus on Re-Entry (Co-Chair)
- Afterschool Caucuses
- Community Health Center's Caucus
- Congressional Arts Caucus
- Congressional Black Caucus
- Congressional Caucus on Black Men and Boys
- Congressional Coalition on Adoption
- Congressional Progressive Caucus
- Congressional Taiwan Caucus
- Congressional Sugar Caucus
- Equity Caucus
- Medicare for All Caucus
- Urban Caucus
- Congressional Caucus on Turkey and Turkish Americans

== Political positions ==
Davis voted to provide Israel with support following the Hamas-led attack on Israel.

Davis voted with President Joe Biden's stated position 100% of the time in the 117th Congress, according to a FiveThirtyEight analysis.

== Electoral history ==
Illinois 7th Congressional District General Election, 1996
Party	Candidate	Votes	%
Democratic	Danny K. Davis	149,568	82.59
Republican	Randy Borow	27,241	15.04
Independent	Chauncey L. Stroud	1,944	1.07
Libertarian	Toietta Dixon	1,571	0.87
Natural Law	Charles A. Winter	771	0.43
Total votes		181,095	100.0

Illinois 7th Congressional District Democratic Primary, 1998
Party	Candidate	Votes	%
Democratic	Danny K. Davis (incumbent)	57,200	85.06
Democratic	Wilner J. Jackson	10,046	14.94
Total votes		67,246	100.0

Illinois 7th Congressional District General Election, 1998
Party	Candidate	Votes	%
Democratic	Danny K. Davis (incumbent)	130,984	92.92
Libertarian	Dorne E. Van Cleave III	9,984	7.08
Total votes		140,968	100.0

Illinois 7th Congressional District General Election, 2000
Party	Candidate	Votes	%
Democratic	Danny K. Davis (incumbent)	164,155	85.93
Republican	Robert Dallas	26,872	14.07
Total votes		191,027	100.0

Illinois 7th Congressional District General Election, 2002
Party	Candidate	Votes	%
Democratic	Danny K. Davis (incumbent)	137,933	83.21
Republican	Mark Tunney	25,280	15.25
Libertarian	Martin Pankau	2,543	1.53
Total votes		165,756	100.0

Illinois 7th Congressional District Democratic Primary, 2004
Party	Candidate	Votes	%
Democratic	Danny K. Davis (incumbent)	84,950	82.21
Democratic	Anita Rivkin-Carothers	15,190	14.70
Democratic	Robert Dallas	3,191	3.09
Total votes		103,331	100.0

Illinois 7th Congressional District General Election, 2004
Party	Candidate	Votes	%
Democratic	Danny K. Davis (incumbent)	221,133	86.13
Republican	Antonio Davis-Fairman	35,603	13.87
Total votes		256,736	100.0

Illinois 7th Congressional District Democratic Primary, 2006
Party	Candidate	Votes	%
Democratic	Danny K. Davis (incumbent)	77,287	88.98
Democratic	Jim Ascot	6,646	7.65
Democratic	Robert Dallas	2,921	3.36
Total votes		86,854	100.0

Illinois 7th Congressional District General Election, 2006
Party	Candidate	Votes	%
Democratic	Danny K. Davis (incumbent)	143,071	86.70
Republican	Charles Hutchinson	21,939	13.30
Write-in votes	Lowell M. Seida	1	0.00
Total votes		165,011	100.0

Illinois 7th Congressional District Democratic Primary, 2008
Party	Candidate	Votes	%
Democratic	Danny K. Davis (incumbent)	129,865	91.14
Democratic	Robert Dallas	12,629	8.86
Total votes		142,494	100.0

Illinois 7th Congressional District General Election, 2008
Party	Candidate	Votes	%
Democratic	Danny K. Davis (incumbent)	235,343	85.02
Republican	Steve Miller	41,474	14.98
Total votes		276,817	100.0

Illinois 7th Congressional District Democratic Primary, 2010
Party	Candidate	Votes	%
Democratic	Danny K. Davis (incumbent)	52,728	66.77
Democratic	Sharon Denise Dixon	10,851	13.74
Democratic	Darlena Williams-Burnett	10,173	12.88
Democratic	Jim Ascot	5,221	6.61
Total votes		78,973	100.0

Illinois 7th Congressional District General Election, 2010
Party	Candidate	Votes	%
Democratic	Danny K. Davis (incumbent)	149,846	81.50
Republican	Mark M. Weiman	29,575	16.09
Independent	Clarence Desmond Clemons	4,428	2.41
Total votes		183,849	100.0

Illinois 7th Congressional District Democratic Primary, 2012
Party	Candidate	Votes	%
Democratic	Danny K. Davis (incumbent)	57,896	84.48
Democratic	Jacques A. Conway	10,638	15.52
Total votes		68,534	100.0

Illinois 7th Congressional District General Election, 2012
Party	Candidate	Votes	%
Democratic	Danny K. Davis (incumbent)	242,439	84.64
Republican	Rita Zak	31,466	10.99
Independent	John H. Monaghan	12,523	4.37
Write-in votes	Phil Collins	5	0.00
Write-in votes	Dennis Richter	2	0.00
Total votes		286,435	100.0

Illinois 7th Congressional District General Election, 2014
Party	Candidate	Votes	%
Democratic	Danny K. Davis (incumbent)	155,110	85.10
Republican	Robert L. Bumpers	27,168	14.90
Total votes		182,278	100.0

Illinois 7th Congressional District Democratic Primary, 2016
Party	Candidate	Votes	%
Democratic	Danny K. Davis (incumbent)	139,378	81.19
Democratic	Thomas Day	32,261	18.79
Democratic	Frederick Collins	25	0.01
Total votes		171,664	100.0

Illinois 7th Congressional District General Election, 2016
Party	Candidate	Votes	%
Democratic	Danny K. Davis (incumbent)	250,584	84.24
Republican	Jeffrey A. Leef	46,882	15.76
Total votes		297,466	100.0

Illinois 7th Congressional District Democratic Primary, 2018
Party	Candidate	Votes	%
Democratic	Danny K. Davis (incumbent)	81,570	73.86
Democratic	Anthony V. Clark	28,867	26.14
Total votes		110,437	100.0

Illinois 7th Congressional District General Election, 2018
Party	Candidate	Votes	%
Democratic	Danny K. Davis (incumbent)	215,746	87.62
Republican	Craig Cameron	30,497	12.38
Total votes		246,243	100.0

Illinois 7th Congressional District Democratic Primary, 2020
Party	Candidate	Votes	%
Democratic	Danny K. Davis (incumbent)	79,813	60.91
Democratic	Kina Collins	18,399	13.88
Democratic	Anthony Clark	17,206	12.98
Democratic	Kristine Schanbacher	17,187	12.96
Total votes		132,605	100.0

Illinois 7th Congressional District General Election, 2020
Party	Candidate	Votes	%
Democratic	Danny K. Davis (incumbent)	249,383	80.41
Republican	Craig Cameron	41,390	13.35
Independent	Tracy Jennings	19,355	6.24
Total votes		310,128	100.0

Illinois 7th Congressional District Democratic Primary, 2022
Party	Candidate	Votes	%
Democratic	Danny K. Davis (incumbent)	39,230	51.88
Democratic	Kina Collins	34,574	45.73
Democratic	Denarvis Mendenhall	1,808	2.39
Total votes		75,612	100.0

Illinois 7th Congressional District General Election, 2022
Party	Candidate	Votes	%
Democratic	Danny K. Davis (incumbent)	167,650	99.94
Write-in		96	0.06
Total votes		167,746	100.0

Illinois 7th Congressional District Democratic Primary, 2024
Party	Candidate	Votes	%
Democratic	Danny K. Davis (incumbent)	42,248	52.45
Democratic	Melissa Conyears Ervin	17,154	21.30
Democratic	Kina Collins	15,188	18.85
Democratic	Nikhil Bhatia	3,808	4.73
Democratic	Kouri Marshall	2,156	2.68
Total votes		80,554	100.0

Illinois 7th Congressional District General Election, 2024
Party	Candidate	Votes	%
Democratic	Danny K. Davis (incumbent)	222,408	83.25
Republican	Chad Koppie	44,598	16.69
Write-in		146	0.05
Total votes		267,152	100.0

== Personal life ==
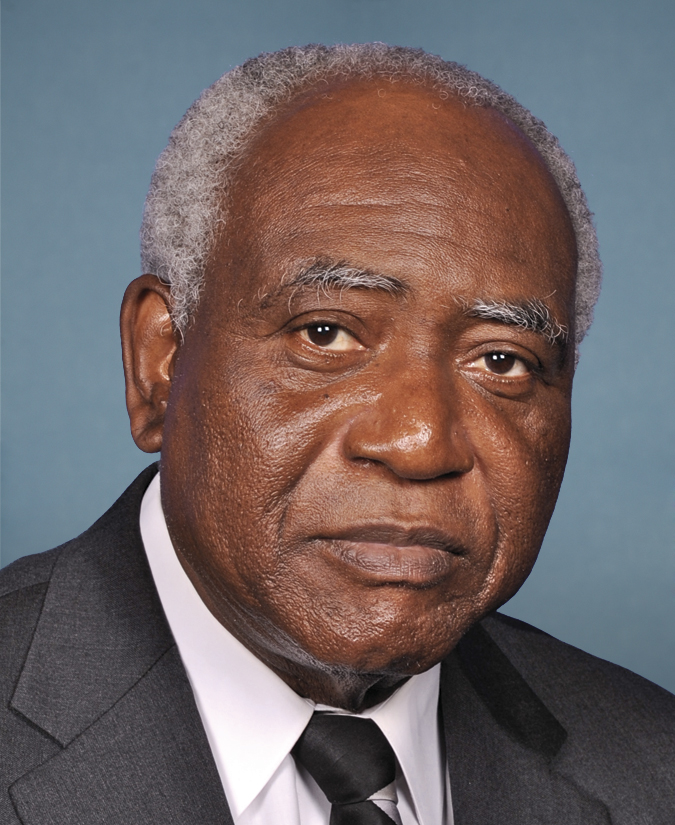
Davis during the 110th Congress

Davis is married to Vera G. Davis. They have two children. Davis is a member of Alpha Phi Alpha fraternity. He is notable for his support of the National Federation of the Blind. He spoke at their 2004 and 2005 conventions.

On November 18, 2016, Davis's 15-year-old grandson Javon Wilson was murdered while trying to break up a fight during a home invasion in Chicago's Englewood neighborhood.

On March 30, 2017, Davis's 44-year-old son Stacey Wilson was found dead in his home. He was Javon Wilson's father.

Davis is a Baptist.

== See also ==
- List of African-American United States representatives

U.S. House of Representatives
Preceded by Cardiss Collins	Member of the U.S. House of Representatives from Illinois's 7th congressional district 1997–present	Incumbent
U.S. order of precedence (ceremonial)
Preceded by Robert Aderholt	United States representatives by seniority 21st	Succeeded by Diana DeGette
Preceded by Jim McGovern	Order of precedence of the United States	Succeeded by Robert Aderholt
