= FarSight Studios =

American video game developer

- Type: Private
- Industry: Video games
- Founded: 1988; 38 years ago
- Founder: Jay Obernolte
- Headquarters: Big Bear Lake, California, United States
- Website: farsightstudios.com

FarSight Studios (formerly FarSight Technologies) is an American video game developer established in 1988 by Jay Obernolte.

== History ==
Jay Obernolte founded FarSight in 1988 while still a student at Caltech. He first learned to program on an Apple II as a child and went to college to study computer engineering. While there, Obernolte was hired by Nintendo, who had recently entered the American video game console market and needed English-language programmers to create games. FarSight Studios' first release was a coloring and animation application, Videomation, for the NES in 1991. They then released a similar game for Sega, Art Alive! In 1992, the company moved to Big Bear. During the 1990s, FarSight Studio's initial success was based on a series of first party football games for Sega. In 2002, the NFL decided to limit the licenses for their brand, forcing FarSight's publisher Konami to stop producing NFL games.

In the 2000s, FarSight transitioned to creating a series of games based on sports and arcade activities. In 2003, they partnered with publisher Crave Entertainment to create the rolling puzzle game Mojo! While reviews were mixed, FarSight studios were able to leverage Mojo's game engine to create a series of games that recreated existing pinball machines. They subsequently released Pinball Hall of Fame: The Gottlieb Collection in 2004, Pinball Hall of Fame: The Williams Collection in 2008, their best-known pinball game The Pinball Arcade in 2012, and Stern Pinball Arcade in 2016. For licensing work on The Pinball Arcade, vice president of product development Bobby King, and CEO Jay Obernolte were named in 2012 on Game Developer Magazine's "Power 50" list.

By 2013 the company had grown to over 30 employees with a two-story building in Big Bear Lake. As of 2024, Obernolte still headed the company, but no longer oversees day to day operations.

== Pinball games ==
FarSight Studios has released four video games that have recreated dozens of pinball machines. The re-creation of pinball machines was described as a form of curation and preservation. For their first game they sought the licenses to existing pinball machine designs, citing a hesitance to develop original pinball designs when existing games already had the necessary creativity and complexity to be successful. FarSight met with Pinball Hall of Fame founder, Tim Arnold, who advised that Gottlieb would be the easiest and most affordable company to obtain licenses from. Pinball Hall of Fame: The Gottlieb Collection was developed and released in 2004 (two years before actual the Pinball Hall of Fame opened). FarSight again partnered with Crave Entertainment to publish the game. Surprised at how successful this was they obtained the more expensive Williams license and released Pinball Hall of Fame: The Williams Collection in 2008. This received positive critical reviews, but had limited commercial success with disappointing sales.

Bobby King was the lead designer for The Pinball Arcade and this was the first game FarSight Studios self-published in February 2012. For this a more extensive licensing agreement was agreed with Williams, the Gottlieb contract was extended, and a new license was signed with Stern. To cover the $55,000 licensing fee to recreate The Twilight Zone pinball machine, FarSight launched a Kickstarter campaign that raised $75,000 from more than 2,300 backers. The additional funds were used to acquire more licenses. Unlike prior games, The Pinball Arcade used ROM emulation to recreate the original software. Designers also disassembled physical pinball machines to photograph individual parts as part of the digital conversion. The first season of the game included 22 tables. By 2013 The Pinball Arcade had been downloaded over 7,000,000 times. In 2014, King stated that the company was exploring creating original pinball games.

They are an official licensed developer for numerous home and handheld consoles including the Sony PlayStation 4, PlayStation 3 and Move, PlayStation 2, PSP, and PlayStation Vita; the Microsoft Xbox, Xbox 360, and Kinect; as well as the Nintendo Wii, Wii U, DS, and 3DS. In September 2018, FarSight announced that they will also be developing several pinball tables for the Oculus Rift.

Stern Pinball Arcade was released in 2016, with tables from Stern Pinball. Users could play Mary Shelley's Frankenstein for free while additional games, including Starship Troopers and Ripley's Believe It or Not!, would be priced at $5 to $10 per game.

In May 2018, FarSight announced that they would no longer produce games licensed from Williams and Bally, leading to a loss of 61 tables from The Pinball Arcade catalog, and announced they will focus mainly on tables under the Stern Pinball license.

== Other games ==
Game Party was developed in 2007, incorporating classic games of skill. It was originally developed by Midway Games who entered a publishing agreement with FarSight to design the actual game. The development process took six months

FarSight Studios have also released official games based on PBA Pro Bowling from 2019, Cornhole in 2023, and Pickleball in 2024.

== Games ==
This is a sortable table of computer and video games produced by FarSight Studios, in alphabetical order.

| Title | Publisher(s) | Release | Platforms |
|---|---|---|---|
| Action 52 | Active Enterprises | 1993 | SMD |
| ACL Pro Cornhole | FarSight Studios | 2023 | PC |
| Art Alive! | Sega | 1991 | SMD |
| Backyard Baseball '09/'10 | Atari | 2008-9 | PS2, PC, X360, Wii |
| Backyard Football '08/'09/'10 | Atari | 2007-9 | PS2, PC, DS, Wii ('10: PS2, X360, Wii) |
| Brunswick Pro Bowling | Crave Entertainment | 2007 | X360, PS3 |
| Color a Dinosaur | Virgin Games | 1993 | NES |
| David Crane's Amazing Tennis | Absolute Entertainment | 1993 | SMD |
| ESPN NFL PrimeTime 2002 | Konami | 2001 | PS2, Xbox, PC |
| Game Party (series) | Midway Games | 2007-9 | Wii |
| Game Party: In Motion | Warner Bros. Interactive | 2010 | X360 |
| Golden Tee Golf: Home Edition | Radica Games | 2006 | |
| Hard Rock Casino | Crave Entertainment | 2006 | PS2, PSP |
| Hotel for Dogs | 505 Games | 2009 | PS2, PSP |
| Jibbi | Radica Games | 2006 | |
| Mojo! | Crave Entertainment; DreamCatcher Interactive (PAL) | 2003; 2004 (PAL) | PS2, Xbox |
| NASCAR Road Racing | EA Sports | 1999 | PC |
| NCAA Football 98/99 | EA Sports | 1997, 1998 | PC |
| NFL '95 | Sega | 1994 | SMD |
| NFL Prime Time '98 | Sega | 1997 | SMD |
| Orbals | FarSight Studios | 2021 | PC |
| PBA Pro Bowling (series) | FarSight Studios | 2019-2026 | PC (PS4, XONE for 2019 version only) |
| The Pinball Arcade | FarSight Studios | 2012 | PC, X360, PS3, VITA, PS4, XONE |
| Pinball Hall of Fame: The Gottlieb Collection •Gottlieb Pinball Classics^{EU} | Crave Entertainment | 2004; 2005 (PSP); 2010 (Wii) | PS2, NGC, Xbox, PSP, Wii |
| Pinball Hall of Fame: The Williams Collection | Crave Entertainment | 2008; 2009 (PS3, 360) | PS2, PSP, X360, PS3, Wii, 3DS |
| Play TV (series) | Radica Games | 2004-6 | |
| PPA Pickleball Tour 2025 | FarSight Studios | 2024 | PC |
| Prime Time NFL Starring Deion Sanders | Sega | 1995 | SMD |
| Scarface: Money. Power. Respect. | Sierra Entertainment | 2006 | PSP |
| Stern Pinball Arcade | FarSight Studios | 2016 | PC, PS4, XONE |
| Vacation Isle: Beach Party | Warner Bros. Interactive | 2010 | Wii |
| Videomation | THQ | 1991 | NES |
