= Game Party Champions =

2012 video game

- North American box art
- Developer: Phospor Games
- Publisher: Warner Bros. Interactive Entertainment
- Engine: Unreal Engine 3
- Platform: Wii U
- Release: NA: November 18, 2012; EU: November 30, 2012; AU: November 30, 2012
- Genre: Party
- Modes: Single-player, multiplayer

Game Party Champions is the fifth video game in the Game Party series, releasing as a launch title for the Wii U console in North America and Europe. It is the successor to Game Party: In Motion, and it is the latest installment in the Game Party series.

== Gameplay ==
Game Party Champions features eight mini games to choose from:: Ping Pong, Skill Ball, Water Gun, Mini Golf, Air Hockey, Hoop Shoot, Football, and Baseball. These eight mini games are used as the basis for all three modes of gameplay.

The first mode is the Story Mode, in which a single player initially chooses a male or female avatar (though this choice has no impact on the gameplay), then progresses through several locations (Arcade, Amusement Park, and Stadium) to defeat other players in minigames, which is represented by either a computer opponent or a preset score, depending on the minigame. Each minigame has five opponents of increasing difficulty, and successfully defeating an opponent unlocks the next one for that minigame. Upon defeating the final opponent for a minigame (also known as the Champion of the game), that minigame is marked complete. Completing all minigames in an area allows the player to progress to the next area. The second mode is Free Play Mode, which allows a single player to play all the minigames without restrictions.

The final mode of gameplay, as well as the only multiplayer mode, is the Party Mode. In this mode, up to four players compete in a board game to see who can make it to the end first. On their turn, a player spins a spinner to see how many spaces they move, then plays a single-player minigame based on what space they landed on. If the player successfully completes the minigame, they stay where they are, while if they fail the minigame, they return to the space they were on previously.

== Reception ==
Game Party Champions

Aggregate score
Aggregator	Score
Metacritic	24/100

Review scores
Publication	Score
Nintendo Life	1/10
Official Nintendo Magazine	12%
XGN	6/10
Gamereactor Sweden	1/10

Game Party Champions received "generally unfavorable" reviews from critics, according to the review aggregation website Metacritic, because of game loading issues and unenjoyable gameplay.

The Official Nintendo Magazine describes the game "as welcome as an ingrown toenail and twice as ugly". The Official Nintendo Magazine previously developed a hatred towards the first Game Party, admitting this entry in the series is more tolerable. The reviewer Chris Shilling particularly dislikes the Computer AI, describing the ways they cheat in Air Hockey. His only appraisal comes from Baseball, with the controls can being occasionally unresponsive, it is his favorite mode in the game. While he describes some modes as mediocre, his least favorite modes are Miniature Golf and Ping Pong, which are described as "abysmal" and "barely functional". In addition, the Water Gun mode involves poor use of the Wii U GamePad.

In addition to the 12% rating, the Official Nintendo Magazine ranked Game Party Champions as the second worst Wii U game in 2013. This placed it above Family Party: 30 Great Games - Obstacle Arcade, which was ranked as the worst.

Ken Barnes from Nintendo Life gave the game a 1/10, since the game modes were not enjoyable with mixed controls. He mentions the consistent slowdown issues and long loading times, taking upwards of one minute to play a new game. The multiplayer is not simultaneous aside from "griefing" players in the Party Mode, and the use of the GamePad either requires a stylus or is not used at all. Ken Barnes states "This is so bad that your great-great-grandchildren will want to change their surname when they find out that you once played it. Avoid."

The Dutch review site XGN suggests Nintendo Land is the better minigame collection for the Wii U launch.
