= Brunswick Pro Bowling =

2007 video game

- Developer(s): Wii, PlayStation 2, PlayStation Portable; Point of View, Inc. PlayStation 3, Xbox 360; FarSight Studios; PlayStation 4, Xbox One, Wii U Alliance Digital Media
- Publisher(s): NA: Crave Entertainment; EU: 505 Games; WW: Alliance Digital Media (PlayStation 4, Xbox One, Wii U)
- Platform(s): Wii, PlayStation 2, PlayStation Portable, iOS, PlayStation 3, Xbox 360, PlayStation 4, Xbox One, Wii U, Android
- Release: Wii, PlayStation 2, PlayStation Portable: NA: August 28, 2007; EU: September 21, 2007; AU: September 27, 2007; PlayStation 3: NA: September 22, 2010; EU: April 8, 2011; Xbox 360: AU: December 16, 2010; NA: February 15, 2011; EU: April 8, 2011; PlayStation 4, Xbox One: NA: November 23, 2015; Wii U: NA: January 21, 2016
- Genre(s): Sports, Bowling
- Mode(s): Single-player, multiplayer

Brunswick Pro Bowling is a video game developed by Point of View, Inc. and published by Crave Entertainment. The game features many Brunswick -labeled products such as Brunswick bowling balls and pinsetters. The game was released for the Wii, PlayStation 2 and PlayStation Portable on August 22, 2007. A version for iOS was released in October 2009 but was later removed. It was replaced by the FarSight Studios version in February 2015, also being released on Android as well. FarSight Studios developed versions of the game for the PlayStation 3 and Xbox 360, which support the PlayStation Move and Kinect respectively. An updated version developed and published by Alliance Digital Media for the PlayStation 4, and Xbox One was released on November 23, 2015. The Wii U version was released on January 21, 2016.

== Gameplay ==
The game has a free play mode, in which up to four players can play against each other in a match. In the career mode players work their way up from an amateur to professional bowler and a multiplayer mode lets up to four players compete against each other. The PSP version includes wireless multiplayer and additional character customization. The Wii version uses the Wii's tilt sensor to simulate a real swing.

== Reception ==
Reception

Aggregate score
Aggregator	Score					
Aggregator	PS2	PS3	PSP	Wii	Wii U	Xbox 360
Metacritic	N/A	N/A	N/A	52/100	N/A	44/100

Review scores
Publication	Score					
Publication	PS2	PS3	PSP	Wii	Wii U	Xbox 360
Eurogamer	N/A	N/A	N/A	3/10	N/A	N/A
GameSpot	6.5/10	N/A	6.5/10	6/10	N/A	N/A
IGN	N/A	4/10	N/A	5.5/10	N/A	N/A
Jeuxvideo.com	7/20	N/A	N/A	7/20	N/A	N/A
Nintendo Life	N/A	N/A	N/A	N/A	2/10	N/A

The reception of Brunswick Pro Bowling has been mixed. Most critics praised the realistic physics of the game. However, others were annoyed by the fact that the Wii version has flaws with its controls. Players have complained that the on-screen bowler moves slowly and does not go with their own movements, therefore making the release confusing and shots hard. Reviewers did however note there was some considerable depth if the player was to play longer.
