= Paul Cook (politician) =

American politician (born 1943)

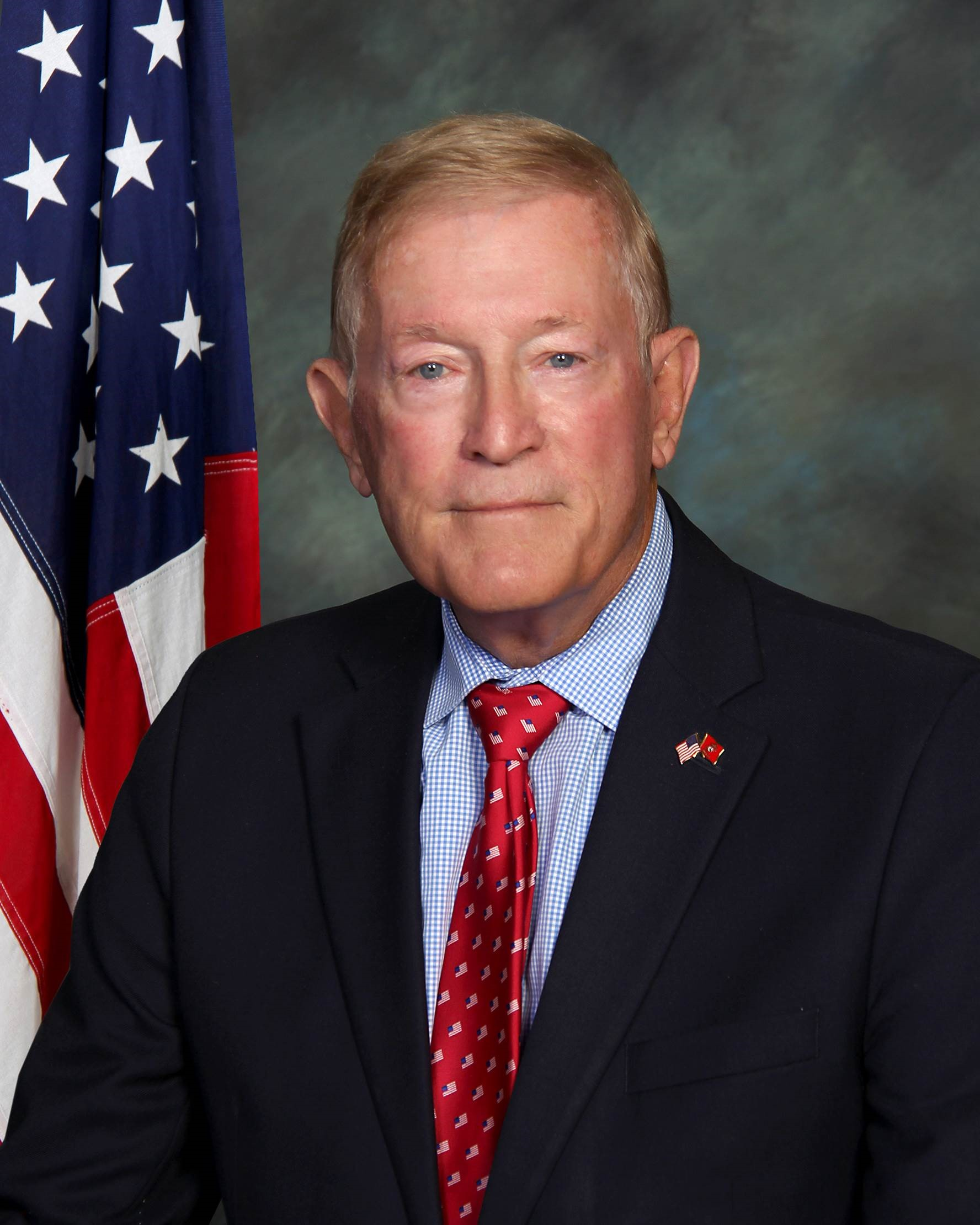
- Official portrait, 2020

Vice Chair of San Bernardino County
- In office January 10, 2023 – January 8, 2025
- Preceded by: Dawn Rowe
- Succeeded by: Joe Baca Jr.

Member of the San Bernardino County Board of Supervisors from the 1st district
- Incumbent
- Assumed office December 7, 2020
- Preceded by: Robert Lovingood

Member of the U.S. House of Representatives from California's 8th district
- In office January 3, 2013 – December 7, 2020
- Preceded by: Jerry Lewis
- Succeeded by: Jay Obernolte

Member of the California State Assembly from the 65th district
- In office December 4, 2006 – November 30, 2012
- Preceded by: Russ Bogh
- Succeeded by: Sharon Quirk-Silva

Personal details
- Born: Paul Joseph Cook; March 3, 1943 (age 83) Meriden, Connecticut, U.S.
- Party: Republican
- Spouse: Jeanne Cook
- Education: Southern Connecticut State University (BS); California State University, San Bernardino (MPA); University of California, Riverside (MA)

Military service
- Branch/service: United States Marine Corps
- Years of service: 1966–1992
- Rank: Colonel
- Battles/wars: Vietnam War
- Awards: Bronze Star; Purple Heart (2)

Paul Joseph Cook (born March 3, 1943) is an American politician serving as a San Bernardino County Supervisor since 2020, previously serving as the U.S. representative for California's 8th congressional district from 2013 to 2020. A member of the Republican Party, Cook also served on the Yucca Valley Town Council from 1998 to 2006 and represented the 65th district in the California State Assembly from 2006 to 2012.

In September 2019, Cook announced that he would not run for re-election to Congress in 2020, and instead run for a seat on the San Bernardino County Board of Supervisors. In the March 3, 2020 primary election, Cook defeated three opponents with an outright majority to avoid a November runoff and succeed Robert A. Lovingood, making him the new supervisor from San Bernardino County's 1st district. Cook resigned his U.S. House seat and assumed his new office on December 7, 2020.

== Early life and education ==
Cook was born in Meriden, Connecticut in 1943. He was raised in Meriden and did not permanently move to California until the end of his military career. In 1966, he graduated from Southern Connecticut State University, earning a B.S. in teaching.

=== Military service ===
Later that year, he joined the United States Marine Corps. As an infantry officer, Cook served in the Vietnam War. His actions in combat earned him many honors, including the Bronze Star and two Purple Hearts. He served in the Marine Corps for 26 years.

After he retired from the Marine Corps in 1992 as a colonel, he earned an MPA from California State University, San Bernardino in 1996 and a master's in political science from University of California Riverside in 2000.

== Early career ==
From 1993 to 1994, he was Director of Yucca Valley Chamber of Commerce. From 1998 to 2002, he was a professor at Copper Mountain College. Cook taught courses on political violence and terrorism at University of California Riverside since 2002.

=== California Assembly ===
==== Elections ====
In 2006, Cook ran for California's 65th Assembly District. Cook won a five candidate Republican primary field with 29% of the vote. In the general election, Cook defeated Democrat Rita Ramirez-Dean 60%–37%. In 2008, he won re-election to a second term, defeating Democrat Carl Wood 53%–47%. In 2010, he won re-election to a third term, defeating Wood again 58%–42%.

==== Tenure ====
The 65th district included the cities of Banning, Beaumont, Big Bear Lake, Calimesa, Cherry Valley, Hemet, Moreno Valley, Perris, San Jacinto, Sun City, Twentynine Palms, Yucaipa, Yucca Valley and other smaller communities and unincorporated areas in Riverside County, San Bernardino County, Inyo County and Mono County.

The California Chamber of Commerce and the California Taxpayers Association gave Cook a perfect 100% rating, 2007–2011. In 2010, Democratic Speaker of the Assembly John Pérez appointed Cook to chair the Veterans Affairs Committee, the first time a Democratic speaker had appointed a Republican to chair a committee since 2002.

==== Committee assignments ====
- Accountability and Administrative Review Committee
- Budget Committee
- Emergency Management Committee
- Governmental Organization Committee
- Higher Education Committee
- Inland Empire Transportation Issues Committee
- Master Plan for Higher Education
- Preservation of California's Entertainment Industry Committee
- Sunset Review Committee
- Veterans Affairs Committee (Chair)
- Judiciary Committee

== U.S. House of Representatives ==
=== 2012 campaign ===
In January 2012, 34-year incumbent Jerry Lewis announced he would not seek re-election in November. Cook entered the primary for the district, which had been renumbered from the 41st to the 8th in redistricting. He finished second in the 13-candidate all-party open primary. He earned 15% of the vote. Fellow Republican and conservative activist Gregg Imus ranked first with 16% of the vote. Cook was endorsed by the California Off-Road Vehicle Association (CORVA) past presidents, the San Bernardino Sun, National Vietnam and Gulf War Veterans Coalition, the County Farm Bureau, state Assemblyman Steve Knight, state Senator Sharon Runner, and U.S. Congressman Ed Royce. In the November election, Cook defeated Imus 58%–42%.

=== Tenure ===
In 2013, Cook co-signed a letter to then-president Barack Obama, urging him to finalize the Keystone XL pipeline, stating that it was about "jobs, jobs jobs." He also expressed fear that China "is ready to take advantage of America's missteps with the Keystone pipeline."

Early in 2017, Cook voted in favor of repealing the Affordable Care Act. His reason for voting for the repeal was to ensure that "every American has access to quality care to fit their budget." In August 2017, he voted in favor of outlawing late term abortions, unless the woman was a victim of rape or incest or that her life was threatened.

Cook voted in favor of the Tax Cuts and Jobs Act of 2017. By voting for the bill, Cook says that the bill will "deliver crucial tax relief for middle-class and low-income Americans." He voted for this bill because more than 90 percent of taxpaying constituents will receive a tax break. He also supports it because it simplifies the tax code.

=== Committee assignments ===
- Committee on Armed Services
  - Subcommittee on Tactical Air and Land Forces
  - Subcommittee on Seapower and Projection Forces
- Committee on Foreign Affairs
  - Subcommittee on Europe and Eurasia
  - Subcommittee on Terrorism, Nonproliferation, and Trade
- Committee on Veterans' Affairs
  - Subcommittee on Disability Assistance and Memorial Affairs
  - Subcommittee on Economic Opportunity

=== Caucus memberships ===
- Congressional Cement Caucus
- House Baltic Caucus
- Republican Main Street Partnership
- Congressional Western Caucus

== Political positions ==
In the first session of the 115th United States Congress, Cook was ranked the 33rd most bipartisan member of the House by the Bipartisan Index, a metric published by The Lugar Center and Georgetown's McCourt School of Public Policy to assess congressional bipartisanship.

Cook opposes abortion, as well as Common Core State Standards.

Cook supports repealing the Affordable Care Act ("Obamacare"). He supports legislation that "decreases premiums, makes it easier for employers to offer affordable healthcare options for their employees, and allows greater freedom for people to purchase a plan of their choice."

Cook believes that the Deferred Action for Childhood Arrivals (DACA) is unconstitutional.

== Personal life ==
Cook resides in Apple Valley, California with his wife, Jeanne.

== Electoral history ==
California State Assembly 65th District Republican Primary Election, 2006
Party	Candidate	Votes	%
Republican	Paul Cook	10,193	28.8
Republican	Brenda Salas	8,062	22.8
Republican	Jim Ayres	7,870	22.1
Republican	Robin Lowe	7,648	21.5
Republican	Ken Smith	1,711	4.8

California State Assembly 65th District Election, 2006
Party	Candidate	Votes	%
Republican	Paul Cook	67,669	60.0
Democratic	Rita Ramirez-Dean	41,906	37.1
Peace and Freedom	John Taleb	3,358	2.

California State Assembly 65th District Election, 2008
Party	Candidate	Votes	%
Republican	Paul Cook (inc.)	93,566	53.3
Democratic	Carl Wood	82,305	46.7

California State Assembly 65th District Election, 2010
Party	Candidate	Votes	%
Republican	Paul Cook (inc.)	78,475	57.9
Democratic	Carl Wood	57,212	42.1

California's 8th Congressional District Primary Election, 2012
Party	Candidate	Votes	%
Republican	Gregg Imus	12,754	15.6
Republican	Paul Cook	12,517	15.3
Republican	Phil Liberatore	12,277	15.0
Democratic	Jackie Conaway	11,674	14.3
Republican	Brad Mitzelfelt	8,801	10.8
Democratic	John Pinkerton	7,941	9.1
Republican	Angela Valles	4,924	6.0
Republican	Ryan McEachron	3,181	3.9
Independent	Anthony Adams	2,750	3.4
Republican	Bill Jensen	1,850	2.3
Republican	George Craig	1,376	1.7
Republican	Joseph Napolitano	1,050	1.3
Republican	Dennis Albertsen	761	0.9

California's 8th Congressional District Election, 2012
Party	Candidate	Votes	%
Republican	Paul Cook	103,093	57.4
Republican	Gregg Imus	76,551	42.6

California's 8th Congressional District Primary Election, 2014
Party	Candidate	Votes	%
Republican	Paul Cook (inc.)	40,007	58.1
Democratic	Bob Conaway	12,885	18.7
Republican	Paul Hannosh	9,037	13.1
Democratic	Odessia Lee	6,930	10.1

California's 8th Congressional District Election, 2014
Party	Candidate	Votes	%
Republican	Paul Cook (inc.)	77,480	67.6
Democratic	Bob Conaway	37,056	32.4

California's 8th Congressional District Primary Election, 2016
Party	Candidate	Votes	%
Republican	Paul Cook (inc.)	50,425	42.0
Democratic	Rita Ramirez	26,325	21.9
Republican	Tim Donnelly	24,886	20.7
Democratic	John Pinkerton	11,780	9.8
Democratic	Roger La Plante	6,661	5.5

U.S. House of Representatives
Preceded by Nancy Pelosi	Member of the U.S. House of Representatives from California's 8th congressional district 2013–2020	Succeeded by Jay Obernolte
U.S. order of precedence (ceremonial)
Preceded by Laura Richardson as Former U.S. Representative	Order of precedence of the United States as Former U.S. Representative	Succeeded by Katie Porter as Former U.S. Representative
