= Young Kim =

American politician (born 1962)

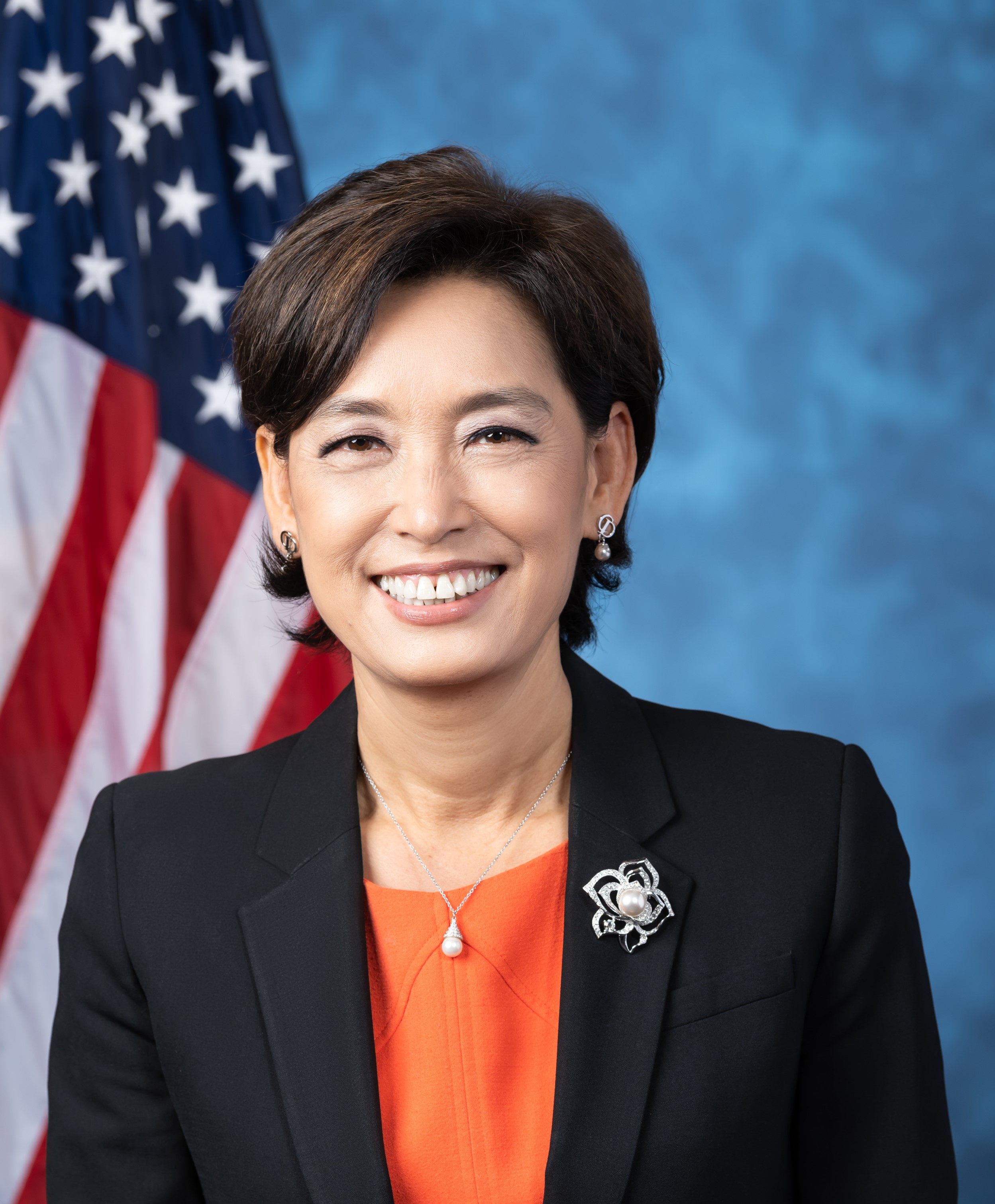
- Official portrait, 2020

Member of the U.S. House of Representatives from California
- Incumbent
- Assumed office January 3, 2021
- Preceded by: Gil Cisneros
- Constituency: 39th district (2021–2023); 40th district (2023–present)

Member of the California State Assembly from the 65th district
- In office December 1, 2014 – November 30, 2016
- Preceded by: Sharon Quirk-Silva
- Succeeded by: Sharon Quirk-Silva

Personal details
- Born: Choe Young-oak; October 18, 1962 (age 64) Incheon, South Korea
- Party: Republican
- Spouse: Charles Kim (m. 1986)
- Children: 4
- Education: University of Southern California (BBA)
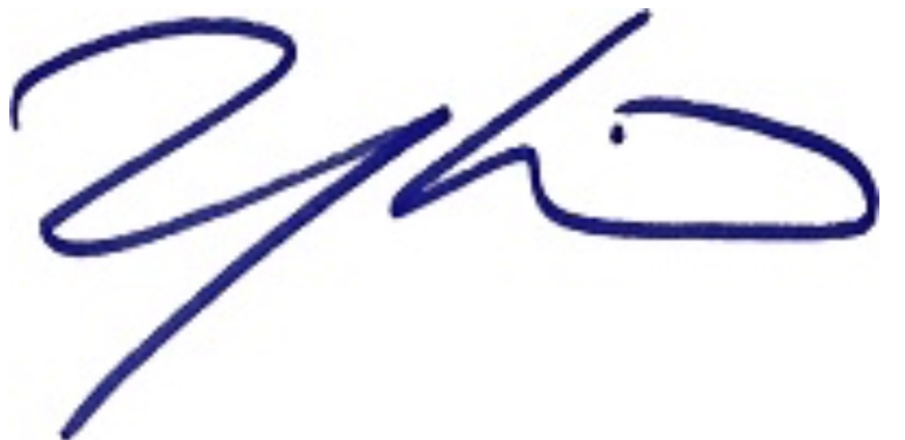
- Signature
- Website: House website Campaign website
- Kim's voice Kim on China's developing country status. Recorded March 27, 2023

Young Oak Kim (Note: "Oak" also sometimes romanized as "Ok") (née Choe (최;崔); Korean: 김영옥; Hanja: 金映玉; born October 18, 1962) is a South Korean–born American politician and businesswoman serving as the U.S. representative for California's 40th congressional district, previously representing the 39th congressional district from 2021 to 2023. Her district includes northern parts of Orange County. She is a member of the Republican Party.

Prior to serving in Congress, Kim served in the California State Assemblywoman, representing the 65th district from 2014 to 2016, defeating the incumbent Democrat Sharon Quirk-Silva in 2014. Kim lost the seat in a rematch with Quirk-Silva in 2016. Kim was the first South Korean-born Republican woman elected to the California State Legislature.

Kim was first elected to Congress in 2020, defeating Democratic incumbent Gil Cisneros in a rematch. In the 2020 United States House of Representatives elections, Kim, Michelle Steel, and Marilyn Strickland became the first Korean-American women elected to the United States Congress. Along with Steel and David Valadao, Kim was among the first three Republican candidates to unseat an incumbent House Democrat in California since 1994.

== Early life and education ==
Kim was born in 1962 in Incheon, South Korea, and spent her childhood in Seoul. She and her family left South Korea in 1975, living first in Guam, where she finished junior high school, and then Hawaii, where she attended high school. She has a bachelor's degree in business administration from the University of Southern California.

== Early career ==
After graduating from USC, Kim worked as a financial analyst for First Interstate Bank and then as a controller for JK Sportswear Manufacturing. She also started her own business in the clothing industry.

Kim worked for state senator Ed Royce after her husband met Royce while promoting a nonprofit organization, the Korean American Coalition. After Royce was elected to the U.S. House of Representatives, Kim worked for 21 years as his community liaison and director of Asian affairs. During much of that time she also appeared regularly on her own television show, "LA Seoul with Young Kim", and her radio show, "Radio Seoul", on which she discussed political issues affecting Korean Americans.

== California State Assembly ==
Kim was elected to the Assembly in 2014, defeating Democratic assemblymember Sharon Quirk-Silva. In 2016, Quirk-Silva defeated Kim.

In 2014, Kim opposed a California law "requiring schools to allow transgender students to use bathrooms of their choice and participate in sports by their gender identity rather than their anatomical gender." During an Orange County Register interview, she said she opposed the law out of concern that new school facilities could need to be constructed, additional spending could be required, students could change their identity "on a whim", and that male-to-female transgender students would have an unfair advantage in sports. She has said transgender people "deserve to be respected" but that she does not believe that LGBT individuals were born with their identities or orientations.

In 2016, Kim's Assembly reelection platform included opposing changes to Proposition 13, which limits property taxes.

== U.S. House of Representatives ==
=== Elections ===
==== 2018 loss ====
In 2017, Kim announced her candidacy for the Orange County Board of Supervisors, a nonpartisan office, in the 4th district, which includes Fullerton, Placentia, La Habra, and Brea, plus portions of Anaheim and Buena Park. In January 2018, immediately after Royce announced his retirement, Kim announced that she would instead enter the race to succeed Royce as the representative for California's 39th congressional district. Royce endorsed Kim the day after announcing his retirement. Kim received the most votes in the primary election among a field of 17 candidates, allowing her to advance to the general election along with the Democratic candidate Gil Cisneros.

Polls showed a tight race throughout the campaign, and FiveThirtyEight called the race a toss-up. Early results on the night of the election showed Kim with a 52.5%-47.5% lead, but she ultimately lost to Cisneros, who received 51.6% of the vote to Kim's 48.4% after mail-in ballots were counted. As the ongoing ballot count showed Kim losing the race, she made allegations of voter fraud but provided no evidence. She conceded on November 18.

==== 2020 ====
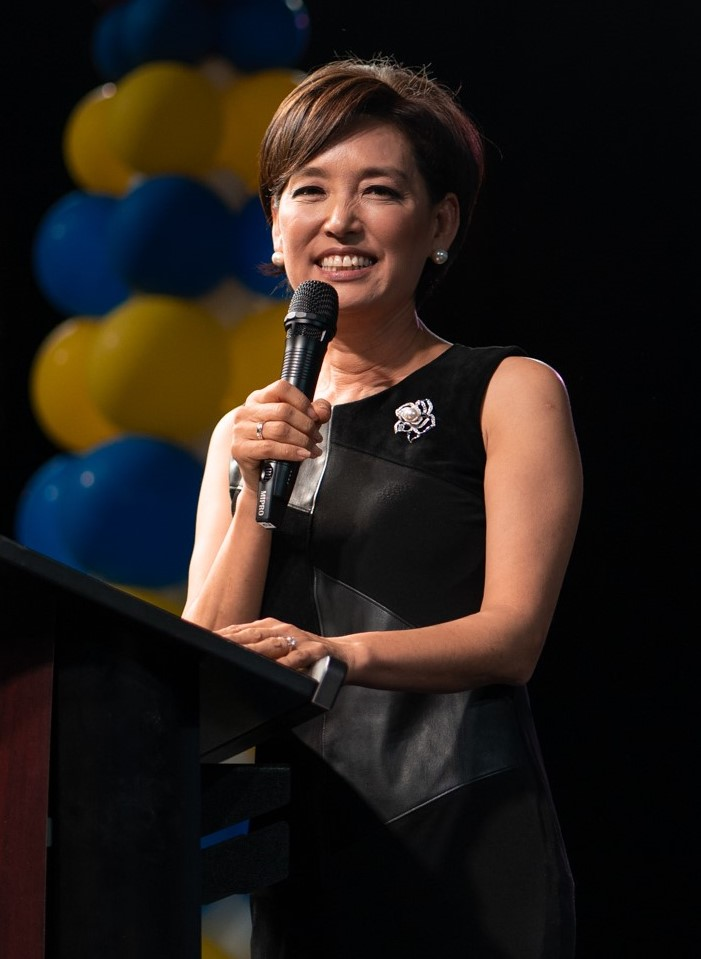
Young Kim campaigning in 2019

In April 2019, Kim announced that she would run again to represent the 39th district. Immediately after her announcement, top party officials rallied behind her, including House minority leader Kevin McCarthy. In the March 2020 jungle primary, Kim received 48.3% of the vote to Cisneros's 46.9%, and thus both advanced out of the primary to a rematch.

Kim proved to be one of the top House fund-raising challengers across the nation, outraising Cisneros $6.16 million to $4.36 million. Unlike in the previous cycle, most election observers rated the race "Lean Democrat", with FiveThirtyEight predicting Kim had a 26% chance of winning.

At the end of election night, Kim led by about 1,000 votes. As mail-in ballots were counted, her lead continued to grow, in contrast to the trend in the previous election. The Associated Press projected her as the winner on November 13. She won even as Democratic presidential nominee Joe Biden carried the district by 10 points. Kim, Michelle Steel and Marilyn Strickland became the first Korean-American women elected to Congress.

==== 2022 ====
In December 2021, Kim announced that she would seek reelection in California's 40th congressional district, due to redistricting.

==== 2024 ====
Kim successfully ran for reelection in the 40th congressional district in 2024, beating Democrat Joe Kerr by about 10 points. Kim continued to received support from Republican groups and officials, including the California Republican Party and former Orange County Supervisor Andrew Do.

=== Tenure ===
On January 3, 2021, Kim was sworn in to the 117th United States Congress.

On January 6, 2021, Kim voted to certify Joe Biden's Electoral College victory, declining to support Trump-led efforts to contest the results.

On January 13, 2021, Kim voted against the second impeachment of Donald Trump. She said she supported censuring Trump but not impeaching him.

On February 4, 2021, Kim joined 10 other Republican House members voting with all voting Democrats to strip Marjorie Taylor Greene of her Education and Labor Committee and Budget Committee assignments in response to controversial political statements she had made.

On February 25, 2021, Kim voted against the Equality Act, a bill that would prohibit discrimination based on gender identity and sexual orientation by amending the Civil Rights Act of 1964 and the Fair Housing Act to explicitly include new protections. In a subsequent statement, Kim stated that she believed that all people should be treated with respect and given equal opportunities, but justified her vote on the grounds that the bill "undermines Americans' religious freedoms, limits protections for people of faith and opens the door to ending the decades-long bipartisan Hyde Amendment."

On February 27, 2021, Kim joined all Republicans to vote against the American Rescue Plan Act of 2021, a $1.9 trillion COVID-19 relief bill, citing lack of bipartisanship and criticizing the bill for only having 9% of the funding directly going toward combating COVID-19, with most of the aid not spent until 2022.

On May 22, 2025, Kim voted for the Republican One Big Beautiful Bill Act.

On June 10, 2025, Kim introduced a resolution condemning the LA protests of June 2025. The resolution was passed by the U.S. House later that month.

=== Committee assignments ===
For the 118th Congress:

- Committee on Financial Services
  - Subcommittee on Financial Institutions and Monetary Policy
  - Subcommittee on National Security, Illicit Finance and International Financial Institutions (Vice Chair)
- Committee on Foreign Affairs
  - Subcommittee on Africa
  - Subcommittee on the Indo-Pacific (Chair)

=== Caucus memberships ===
- Problem Solvers Caucus
- Congressional Caucus on Armenian Issues
- Climate Solutions Caucus
- Congressional Taiwan Caucus
- Congressional Caucus on India and Indian-Americans
- Republican Main Street Partnership
- Republican Governance Group

== Political positions ==
Kim is rated among the most centrist of Republican representatives by Govtrack, based on patterns of sponsorship and co-sponsorship of legislation with Democrats. She voted opposite to the majority of the Republican caucus on several key votes, among them the reauthorization of the Violence Against Women Act and a bill to delay spending cuts in Medicare and other services. Kim voted with the majority of the Republican caucus 96% of the time. As of January 2023, Kim had voted in line with President Joe Biden's stated position 31.0% of the time.

=== Domestic affairs ===
Kim's 2018 congressional platform included opposition to the Affordable Care Act, support for Deferred Action for Childhood Arrivals recipients, support for "the anti-sanctuary city stance taken by the County Board of Supervisors" and support for chain migration. NBC News reported that the issues important to Kim included "creating jobs and keeping taxes low", "beef[ing] up education funding in science, technology, engineering and math", and reforming the immigration system to "ensure those brought to the U.S. 'as children without legal documentation are treated fairly and with compassion.'" She supports student loan forgiveness if the borrower is on the verge of bankruptcy. Kim favors reduced regulations and increased trade. She is a fiscal conservative.

==== Crime ====
In June 2020, after the rising calls to "defund the police" in the aftermath of George Floyd's murder, Kim called these demands "irresponsible" and said that defunding law enforcement would make communities more vulnerable. She called for increased accountability and transparency in law enforcement, as well as an increase in training and reevaluation of guidelines to decrease the use of unnecessary force. Kim also argued that the first steps in making progress would require "treating each other with respect regardless of our race or occupation and having honest conversations without accusations or judgement."

==== COVID-19 ====
In June 2020, Kim criticized President Trump for referring to COVID-19 as "Kung Flu", and received backlash from some in her party.

==== LGBT ====
Kim opposed same-sex marriage in 2018. In 2022, Kim opposed the Respect for Marriage Act, which recognizes the validity of same-sex marriages. The law overturned the Defense of Marriage Act. She voted against the several versions of the bill that came before the House. In 2024, Kim cosponsored the Recover Pride in Service Act, which reverses the dishonorable discharge of LGBT servicemembers impacted by the Don't ask, don't tell policy. Kim was endorsed by the Log Cabin Republicans in 2024.

==== Immigration ====
In 2026, Kim was a cosponsor of the DIGNIDAD Act, which proposes a pathway to legal status for up to 12 million illegal immigrants, paired with stricter border enforcement and mandatory work and restitution requirements.

=== Foreign affairs ===
==== Korea ====
Kim has expressed her concerns on the issue of divided families on the Korean Peninsula, especially Korean Americans with relatives in North Korea. In February 2021, she and Grace Meng co-sponsored H.R.826, the Divided Families Reunification Act, which sought to facilitate reunions between Korean American families and their relatives in North Korea by requiring the Secretary of State and U.S. Special Envoy to North Korea on Human rights to give reports to Congress on their diplomatic efforts.

Kim also worked on the comfort woman issue from the days of Korea under Japanese rule and has said that victims of human trafficking and slavery should be supported. While a California assemblywoman, she attended a protest against Japan's war crimes during WWII at Pershing Square, Los Angeles during Japanese Prime Minister Shinzo Abe's 2015 visit to the U.S. During that gathering, she spoke about comfort women and demanded that the Japanese government issue an apology. In February 2021, she criticized Harvard Law School professor John Mark Ramseyer's claims that those women were "willing sex workers" and urged him to apologize.

== Personal life ==
Kim is married to Charles Kim, a nonprofit administrator and philanthropist. They currently live in Anaheim Hills, California, and previously lived in La Habra, Fullerton, and Cerritos. They have four children. Kim is a Protestant. In 2021, Kim was named by Carnegie Corporation of New York as an honoree of the Great Immigrants Award.

== Electoral history ==
=== 2014 California State Assembly election ===
California's 65th State Assembly district election, 2014
Primary election
| Party | Candidate | Votes | % |
|---|---|---|---|
| Republican | Young Kim | 21,593 | 54.7 |
| Democratic | Sharon Quirk-Silva (incumbent) | 17,896 | 45.3 |
| Total votes | | 39,489 | 100.0 |
General election
| Republican | Young Kim | 42,376 | 54.6 |
| Democratic | Sharon Quirk-Silva (incumbent) | 35,204 | 45.4 |
| Total votes | | 77,580 | 100.0 |
| Republican gain from Democratic | | | |

=== 2016 California State Assembly election ===
California's 65th State Assembly district election, 2016
Primary election
| Party | Candidate | Votes | % |
|---|---|---|---|
| Democratic | Sharon Quirk-Silva | 42,890 | 54.3 |
| Republican | Young Kim (incumbent) | 36,028 | 45.7 |
| Total votes | | 78,918 | 100.0 |
General election
| Democratic | Sharon Quirk-Silva | 69,806 | 52.5 |
| Republican | Young Kim (incumbent) | 63,119 | 47.5 |
| Total votes | | 132,925 | 100 |
| Democratic gain from Republican | | | |

=== 2018 California's 39th congressional district election ===
California's 39th congressional district election, 2018
Primary election
| Party | Candidate | Votes | % |
|---|---|---|---|
| Republican | Young Kim | 30,019 | 21.2 |
| Democratic | Gil Cisneros | 27,469 | 19.4 |
| Republican | Phil Liberatore | 20,257 | 14.3 |
| Democratic | Andy Thorburn | 12,990 | 9.2 |
| Republican | Shawn Nelson | 9,750 | 6.9 |
| Republican | Bob Huff | 8,699 | 6.2 |
| Democratic | Sam Jammal | 7,613 | 5.4 |
| Democratic | Mai-Khanh Tran | 7,430 | 5.3 |
| Democratic | Herbert H. Lee | 5,988 | 4.2 |
| Republican | Steven C. Vargas | 4,144 | 2.9 |
| Democratic | Suzi Park Leggett | 2,058 | 1.5 |
| Republican | John J. Cullum | 1,747 | 1.2 |
| No party preference | Karen Lee Schatzle | 903 | 0.6 |
| No party preference | Steve Cox | 856 | 0.6 |
| Republican | Andrew Sarega | 823 | 0.6 |
| American Independent | Sophia J. Alexander | 523 | 0.4 |
| American Independent | Ted Alemayhu | 176 | 0.1 |
| Total votes | | 141,445 | 100.0 |
General election
| Democratic | Gil Cisneros | 126,002 | 51.6 |
| Republican | Young Kim | 118,391 | 48.4 |
| Total votes | | 229,860 | 100.0 |
| Democratic gain from Republican | | | |

=== 2020 California's 39th congressional district election ===
California's 39th congressional district primary election, 2020
Primary election
| Party | Candidate | Votes | % |
|---|---|---|---|
| Republican | Young Kim | 83,782 | 48.4 |
| Democratic | Gil Cisneros (incumbent) | 81,133 | 46.8 |
| Independent | Steve Cox | 8,264 | 4.8 |
| Total votes | | 173,179 | 100.0 |
General election
| Republican | Young Kim | 172,253 | 50.6 |
| Democratic | Gil Cisneros (incumbent) | 168,108 | 49.4 |
| Total votes | | 316,047 | 100.0 |
| Republican gain from Democratic | | | |

=== 2022 California's 40th congressional district election ===
California's 40th congressional district primary election, 2022
Primary election
| Party | Candidate | Votes | % |
|---|---|---|---|
| Democratic | Asif Mahmood | 74,607 | 40.9 |
| Republican | Young Kim (incumbent) | 63,346 | 34.7 |
| Republican | Greg Raths | 42,404 | 23.2 |
| Republican | Nick Taurus | 2,193 | 1.2 |
| Total votes | | 182,550 | 100.0 |
General election
| Republican | Young Kim (incumbent) | 161,589 | 56.8 |
| Democratic | Asif Mahmood | 122,722 | 43.2 |
| Total votes | | 284,311 | 100.0 |
| Republican hold | | | |

=== 2024 California's 40th congressional district election ===
California's 40th congressional district primary election, 2024
Primary election
| Party | Candidate | Votes | % |
|---|---|---|---|
| Republican | Young Kim (incumbent) | 109,963 | 56.4 |
| Democratic | Joe Kerr | 49,965 | 25.6 |
| Democratic | Allyson Muñiz Damikolas | 35,153 | 18.0 |
| Total votes | | 195,081 | 100.0 |
General election
| Republican | Young Kim (incumbent) | 211,998 | 55.3 |
| Democratic | Joe Kerr | 171,637 | 44.7 |
| Total votes | | 383,635 | 100.0 |
| Republican hold | | | |

== See also ==
- List of Asian Americans and Pacific Islands Americans in the United States Congress
- Asian Americans in politics
- Women in the United States House of Representatives
- History of Korean Americans in Los Angeles
- Asian American and Pacific Islands American conservatism in the United States

== Notes ==
U.S. House of Representatives
| Preceded by Gil Cisneros | Member of the U.S. House of Representatives from California's 39th congressional district 2021–2023 | Succeeded by Mark Takano |
| Preceded by Lucille Roybal-Allard | Member of the U.S. House of Representatives from California's 40th congressional district 2023–present | Incumbent |
U.S. order of precedence (ceremonial)
| Preceded by Sara Jacobs | United States representatives by seniority 258th | Succeeded by Teresa Leger Fernandez |
