= Charles W. Kingsley =

American politician (1860–1931)

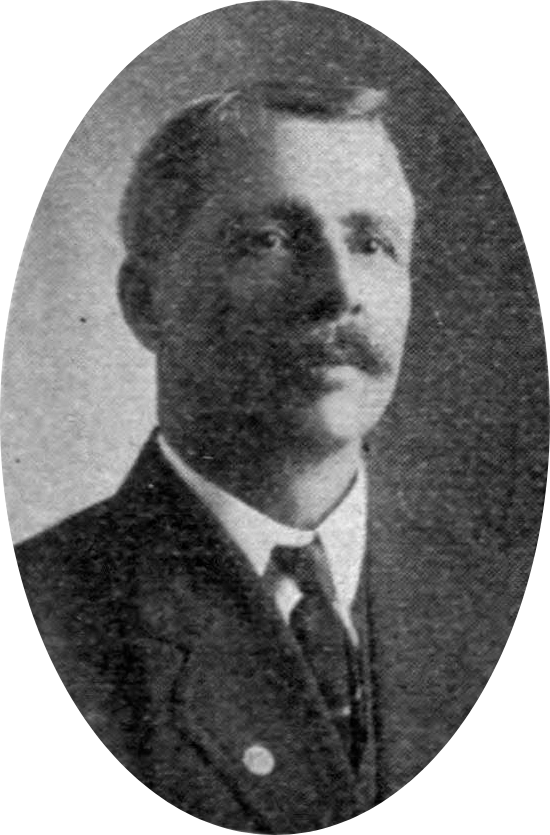
- Kingsley c. 1913

Member of the California State Assembly from the 65th district
- In office January 6, 1913 – January 4, 1915
- Preceded by: David Wallace Mott
- Succeeded by: Peter C. Phillips

Personal details
- Born: Charles William Kingsley; December 12, 1860 Scotland, U.K.
- Died: November 15, 1931 (aged 70) Baldwin Park, California, U.S.
- Party: Socialist
- Spouse: Lizzie Schneeberger (m. 1901)
- Children: Herbert; Charles; Harold
- Education: Common school
- Occupation: Machinist, blacksmith

Charles William Kingsley (December 12, 1860 – November 15, 1931) was a Scottish-American machinist, blacksmith and politician who served one term in the California State Assembly for the 65th district from 1913 to 1915. He made history as the first Socialist elected to the California State Legislature.

Kingsley was born in Scotland in 1860, immigrating to California in 1888 and becoming a naturalized citizen in 1896. In 1912, he was elected to the California State Assembly's 65th district, representing Los Angeles. While in the Assembly, Kingsley sponsored legislation to establish a universal eight-hour workday.

Kingsley married Lizzie Schneeberger, a Swiss native, in Los Angeles on July 3, 1901. They had three sons, one of whom killed himself at 17.

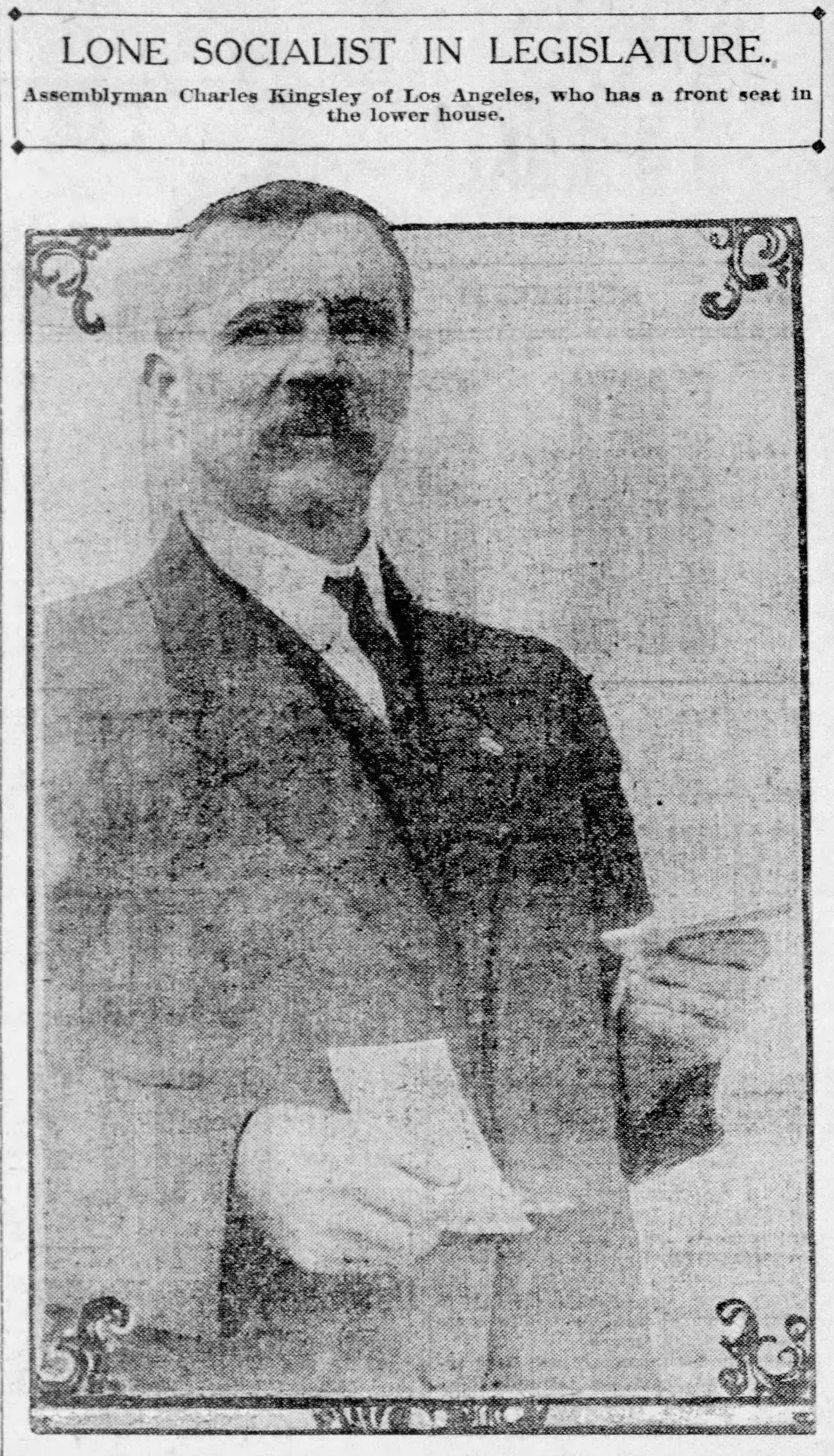
Kingsley as he appeared in the San Francisco Bulletin, January 11, 1913
