= Videomation =

- Cover art
- Developer(s): FarSight Studios
- Publisher(s): Toy Headquarters
- Programmer(s): Rand Siegfried
- Platform(s): NES
- Release: NA: June 1991; ARG: 1992; POL: 1994
- Genre(s): Productivity
- Mode(s): Single-player

Videomation is a North America-exclusive art application for the Nintendo Entertainment System that was released in 1991.

Videomation saw official release outside North America, by BIC, who sold it in Asian cartridge. They give the official license to a well known, regional famiclone distributors like BiT Argentina (known from Bitgame, Super Bitgame and Video Racer), BobMark Int. Poland (known from Pegasus) and others.

== Overview ==
Designing a fantasy house through the use of the Videomation drawing program.

This application allows players to create artwork using a mostly freestyle method, with support for full video animation. The game does not support the use of a mouse or any other external component, requiring users to rely on the NES game controller to draw objects. There is a basic grey screen surrounded by graphics stamps. This application utilizes the CHR RAM chip that is also used in a variety of other contemporaneous NES video games. Thirteen different variations of palettes and seven different kinds of tools (including a pen, various geometric shapes, and the eraser) are available for use in creative compositions. Once the user chooses one of the palettes, there are different colors to choose. The colors include these: turquoise, pink, purple, light blue, and colors that have been dithered.

After drawing a stationary picture, the game allows to place one of a few possible animatable objects (these include a man, a child, a car, a plane, etc.) and then choose a path it will follow on the screen. One options allows the object to follow the cursor.

The game's instruction manual has some ideas for drawing including these: geometric designs with intense patches of color, birds flying over untamed jungles, cars on a race track, and dinosaurs in the user's imaginary backyard.

There is no data storage or export medium, so pictures and video can only be saved by recording a playback of the NES's display through a VCR.

== Reception ==
According to InstallSoftware.com, the game offers a relatively good short-term replay factor while lacking on the long-term replay factor.

== See also ==
- Mario Paint
- Mario Artist
