= Family Party: 30 Great Games Obstacle Arcade =

2012 video game

- North American cover art
- Developers: Art Co., Ltd
- Publishers: JP/NA: D3 Publisher; EU: Namco Bandai Games
- Series: Simple series
- Platform: Wii U
- Release: PAL: November 30, 2012; NA: December 4, 2012; JP: December 20, 2012
- Genre: Party game
- Modes: Single-player, multiplayer

Family Party: 30 Great Games Obstacle Arcade (Note: Known in Japan as Simple Series for Wii U Vol.1: The Family Party (Japanese: SIMPLEシリーズ for Wii U Vol.1 THE ファミリーパーティー)) is a 2012 party video game developed by Art Co., Ltd. and published by D3 Publisher in the United States and Japan, and Namco Bandai Games in Europe for the Wii U. It is part of Simple series, and one of the few games in the series to be localized outside of Japan. The game was released in November 2012 for the PAL region, and in December for North America and Japan.

The game was panned by critics and currently holds the lowest score of any video game on review aggregator Metacritic.

== Gameplay ==
There are two modes of playing the minigames available: Challenge Mode and Freeplay Mode. Challenge Mode has players compete in five set Wii Remote games based on the world selected at the start, with five randomly chosen Wii U GamePad games in between. Up to four people (with CPUs to make sure that there are always four players) can play at once to try to beat a set score and unlock more characters and minigames to play in Freeplay Mode. In Freeplay Mode, up to 10 of the minigames can be chosen, regardless of whether they use the GamePad or the Wii Remotes, to be played in a set order with up to four people (with CPUs to keep the number of players at four, if necessary) with no restrictions or scores to beat.

Despite the title, there are 35 minigames in total. They are spread around five different worlds, with each world having five Wii Remote games and two games that use the Wii U GamePad.

== Reception ==
Reception

Aggregate scores
Aggregator	Score
GameRankings	16.2%
Metacritic	11/100

Review scores
Publication	Score
Eurogamer	1/10
GameRevolution	0/5
Nintendo Life	1/10
Nintendo World Report	1/10
Official Nintendo Magazine	11%
Common Sense Media	2/5
Game Reactor	1/10 (Denmark); 2/10 (Germany); 2/10 (Norway)
GamingXP	26%

Family Party: 30 Great Games Obstacle Arcade received "overwhelming dislike", according the review aggregator website Metacritic, with a score of 11/100. This made it the second lowest-scored game on the website at the time, behind Big Rigs: Over the Road Racing. After Big Rigs, which had five critic reviews, was removed from the full list of game scores (due to Metacritic increasing the minimum review count for featured games to seven critic reviews), Family Party has since become the lowest-scoring game on the website. On GameRankings, the game holds a score of a 16.2%.

Criticism targeted its visuals, design, minigames, controls, and voice acting. Kristoffer Nyrén of Eurogamer said that "the feeling of torture arose" before he played the game, specifically criticizing its graphics for being "extremely outdated" and its controls for frequently malfunctioning. Zack Kaplan of the Nintendo World Report said that "it makes a promise it can't keep, assaults your ears with annoying voice acting, and sucks all the fun out of owning a Wii U", scolding its poor controls, minigames (as "devoid of fun"), and irritating voice acting. Anthony Severino of Game Revolution described it as having "absolutely zero redeeming qualities" and saying "the developers should feel bad", chiding its gameplay (as "borderline unplayable"), controls, and voice acting. The Official Nintendo Magazine gave it a score of 11%, jokingly concluding the review (written in the style of an audiolog) with an "ONM Coroner's Report" that read: "Patient suffered a psychotic breakdown while playing this game. No treatment possible."

== Accolades ==
Publication	Accolade	Year	Rank
Official Nintendo Magazine	Worst Wii U Games	2013	1
ScrewAttack	Worst Wii U Game in 2013, Worst Game of 2013	2013	Won

== See also ==
- Game Party Champions
- Carnival Games
- List of video games notable for negative reception
