= Sharon Quirk-Silva =

American politician

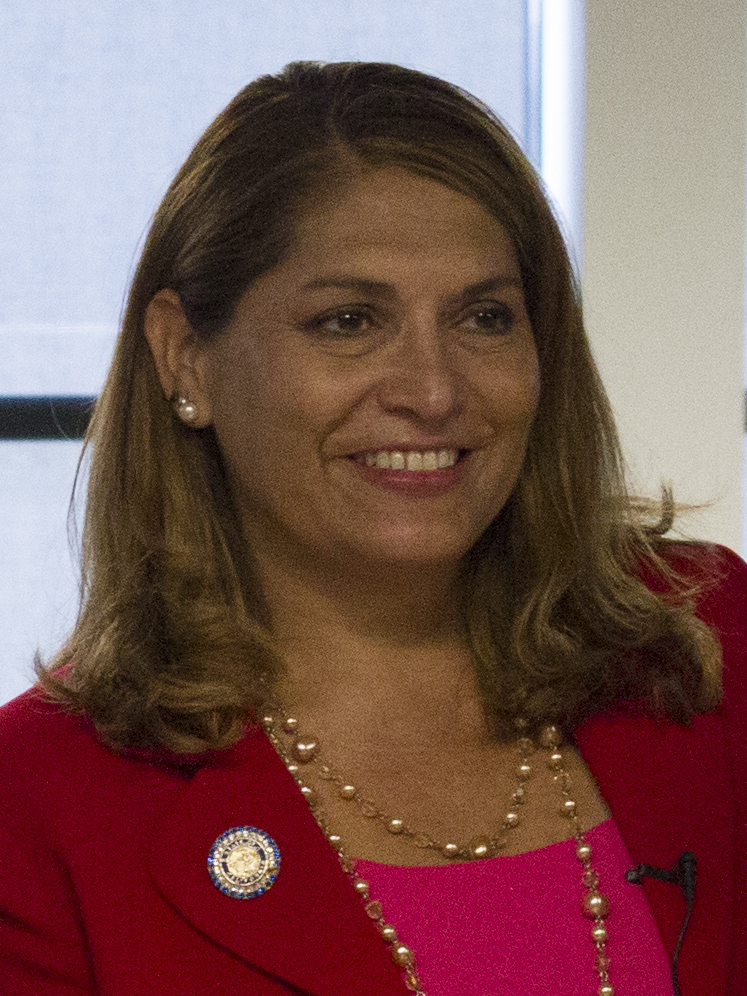
- Quirk-Silva in 2018

Member of the California State Assembly
- Incumbent
- Assumed office December 5, 2016
- Preceded by: Young Kim
- Constituency: 65th district (2016–2022); 67th district (2022–present)
- In office December 3, 2012 – November 30, 2014
- Preceded by: Paul Cook (redistricted)
- Succeeded by: Young Kim
- Constituency: 65th district

Personal details
- Born: Sharon D. Howard; September 17, 1962 (age 63) Los Angeles, California, U.S.
- Party: Democratic
- Spouses: Shawn Quirk (m. 1985; div. 2006): Jesus Silva
- Education: Fullerton College (AA); University of California, Los Angeles (BA); California State University, Fullerton (GrDip)
- Occupation: Politician
- Website: a65.asmdc.org

Sharon Quirk-Silva (born September 17, 1962) is an American politician and educator serving as a member of the California State Assembly, representing the 67th Assembly district.

== Early life and education ==
Quirk-Silva was born in Los Angeles and raised in Fullerton, California. Quirk-Silva earned an Associates of Arts degree from Fullerton College, a Bachelor of Arts in sociology from University of California, Los Angeles and a teaching credential from California State University, Fullerton.

== Personal life ==
She was married to Shawn Quirk from 1985 to 2006. Her current husband, Jesus Silva, is an educator who was elected Mayor of Fullerton in 2018. Quirk-Silva has four children.

== Career ==
Prior to her service in the Assembly, she was the Mayor of Fullerton and an elementary school teacher.

She was first elected to the Assembly in an upset, unseating Republican Assemblyman Chris Norby by a narrow margin in 2012. Quirk-Silva sought a second term in 2014, but was defeated by Republican Young Kim, a former legislative aide. She recaptured her old Assembly seat after defeating Kim in a 2016 rematch after a heated and expensive election. In 2018, she won re-election over music teacher Alexandria Coronado. In 2020, she was reelected over realtor Cynthia Thacker. In 2022, she was reelected over ABC Unified School District Trustee Soo Yoo.

== Election history ==
2012 California State Assembly 65th district election
Primary election
Party	Candidate	Votes	%
Republican	Chris Norby (incumbent)	29,917	58.8
Democratic	Sharon Quirk-Silva	20,936	41.2
Total votes		50,853	100.0
General election
Democratic	Sharon Quirk-Silva	68,988	52.0
Republican	Chris Norby (incumbent)	63,576	48.0
Total votes		132,564	100.0
Democratic gain from Republican			

2014 California State Assembly 65th district election
Primary election
Party	Candidate	Votes	%
Republican	Young Kim	21,593	54.7
Democratic	Sharon Quirk-Silva (incumbent)	17,896	45.3
Total votes		39,489	100.0
General election
Republican	Young Kim	42,376	54.6
Democratic	Sharon Quirk-Silva (incumbent)	35,204	45.4
Total votes		77,580	100.0
Republican gain from Democratic			

2016 California State Assembly 65th district election
Primary election
Party	Candidate	Votes	%
Democratic	Sharon Quirk-Silva	42,890	54.3
Republican	Young Kim (incumbent)	36,028	45.7
Total votes		78,918	100.0
General election
Democratic	Sharon Quirk-Silva	79,654	53.2
Republican	Young Kim (incumbent)	69,941	46.8
Total votes		149,595	100.0
Democratic gain from Republican			

2018 California State Assembly 65th district election
Primary election
Party	Candidate	Votes	%
Democratic	Sharon Quirk-Silva (incumbent)	37,587	52.9
Republican	Alexandria "Alex" Coronado	33,459	47.1
Total votes		71,046	100.0
General election
Democratic	Sharon Quirk-Silva (incumbent)	74,636	57.2
Republican	Alexandria "Alex" Coronado	55,953	42.8
Total votes		130,589	100.0
Democratic hold			

2020 California State Assembly 65th district election
Primary election
Party	Candidate	Votes	%
Democratic	Sharon Quirk-Silva (incumbent)	54,240	57.7
Republican	Cynthia Thacker	39,796	42.3
Total votes		94,036	100.0
General election
Democratic	Sharon Quirk-Silva (incumbent)	112,333	58.3
Republican	Cynthia Thacker	80,468	41.7
Total votes		192,801	100.0
Democratic hold			

2022 California State Assembly 67th district election
Primary election
Party	Candidate	Votes	%
Democratic	Sharon Quirk-Silva (incumbent)	30,873	47.7
Republican	Soo Yoo	25,005	38.6
Democratic	Param Brar	4,800	7.4
Republican	Sou Moua	4,076	6.3
Total votes		64,754	100.0
General election
Democratic	Sharon Quirk-Silva (incumbent)	58,781	53.3
Republican	Soo Yoo	51,441	46.7
Total votes		110,222	100.0
Democratic gain from Republican			

2024 California State Assembly 67th district election
Primary election
Party	Candidate	Votes	%
Democratic	Sharon Quirk-Silva (incumbent)	35,828	52.4
Republican	Elizabeth Culver	28,010	41.0
No party preference	Jacob Woo Ho Lee	4,516	6.6
Total votes		68,354	100.0
General election
Democratic	Sharon Quirk-Silva (incumbent)	93,701	56.8
Republican	Elizabeth Culver	71,161	43.2
Total votes		164,862	100.0
Democratic hold			
