= Color a Dinosaur =

1993 video game

- Developer: FarSight Studios
- Publisher: Virgin Games
- Producers: Erik Yeo; Stephen "The Doc" Clarke-Wilson
- Designer: Jay Obernolte
- Composer: Tommy Tallarico
- Platform: Nintendo Entertainment System
- Release: NA: July 1993
- Genre: Drawing and creativity
- Mode: Single-player

Color a Dinosaur is a 1993 coloring book video game developed by FarSight Studios for the Nintendo Entertainment System. It was created with a budget of $30,000 and, according to producer Stephen Clarke-Wilson, "produced on the cheapest cartridge that Nintendo made". It was only sold at Walmart.

== Gameplay ==
Player can select from a variety of colors.

The player colors various dinosaurs by using the provided dinosaur images and palettes. Players can either color using the free form mode or in the automatic mode where they only choose a color.

Intended for ages 3 to 6, the game lacks sophisticated features such as animation and minigames, and the basic colors are either brightly colored patterns or limited variations of pink or red. An extra set of patterns can be accessed by pressing the Select button.

== Reception ==
The September 1997 issue of Nintendo Power presented the votes of 12 staff members to list their top 100 games of all time. This list also includes their 10 worst games of all time, placing Color a Dinosaur at 9th. The article described the game as "Mario Paint without anything fun in it", and that "even the producer of the game (Seth, wherever you are) would roll his eyes when reminded of this prehistoric patsy."
