= Mojo! =

2003 video game

- North American PlayStation 2 box art
- Developer(s): FarSight Technologies
- Publisher(s): NA: Crave Entertainment; EU: DreamCatcher Interactive
- Platform(s): PlayStation 2, Xbox
- Release: PlayStation 2: NA: August 26, 2003; PAL: March 19, 2004; Xbox: NA: August 26, 2003; PAL: March 26, 2004
- Genre(s): Puzzle
- Mode(s): Single-player, multiplayer

Mojo! is a 2003 puzzle video game released for PlayStation 2 and Xbox. The player controls a marble through a series of traps in order to break all of the colored blocks in a level. It is somewhat similar to Super Monkey Ball, Marble Blast Gold, and Marble Madness, yet is much different and provides a much larger set of puzzles and obstacles to solve. Players receive a bonus if they beat a level in a certain amount of time. There are 100 levels included in the game, and a few multiplayer modes. There is also a stage editor where players can create all new levels. The PlayStation 2 version was issued on CD, while the Xbox version was issued on DVD.

== Reception ==
Reception

Aggregate scores
Aggregator	Score
GameRankings	PS2: 65.46% XBOX: 65.50%
Metacritic	PS2: 63/100

Review scores
Publication	Score
GameSpot	5.9/10
IGN	6.9/10
Official Xbox Magazine (US)	7.3/10

Mojo! received mixed reviews from critics. On Metacritic, the game holds a score of 63/100 for the PlayStation 2 version based on 7 reviews, indicating "mixed or average reviews". On GameRankings, the game holds scores of 65.46% for the PlayStation 2 version based on 12 reviews, and 65.50% for the Xbox version based on 4 reviews.
