= California's 65th State Assembly district =

American legislative district

Current assemblymember
Mike Gipson; D–Carson
- Population (2010) • Voting age • Citizen voting age: 461,510; 345,653; 254,368
- Demographics: 31.01% White; 3.06% Black; 38.85% Latino; 25.27% Asian; 0.47% Native American; 0.54% Hawaiian/Pacific Islander; 0.24% other; 0.57% remainder of multiracial
- Registered voters: 224,960
- Registration: 42.57% Democratic; 28.76% Republican; 24.25% No party preference

California's 65th State Assembly district is one of 80 California State Assembly districts. It is currently represented by Democrat Mike Gipson.

== District profile ==
Up until the 2022 election, the district encompassed parts of north Orange County, anchored by the city of Fullerton. The primarily suburban district was ethnically and socioeconomically diverse.

Orange County – 15.3%

- Anaheim – 38.9%
- Buena Park
- Cypress
- Fullerton
- Garden Grove – 0.4%
- La Palma
- Stanton

== Election results from statewide races ==
Year	Office	Results
2021	Recall	No 56.6 – 43.4%
2020	President	Biden 57.0 – 40.9%
2018	Governor	Newsom 54.5 – 45.5%
2018	Senator	Feinstein 55.4 – 44.6%
2016	President	Clinton 56.7 – 37.3%
2016	Senator	Sanchez 50.6 – 49.4%
2014	Governor	Kashkari 50.7 – 49.3%
2012	President	Obama 51.9 – 45.7%
2012	Senator	Feinstein 54.2 – 45.8%

== List of assembly members representing the district ==
Due to redistricting, the 65th district has been moved around different parts of the state. The current iteration resulted from the 2021 redistricting by the California Citizens Redistricting Commission.

Assembly members	Party	Years served	Counties represented	Notes
D. M. Pyle	Republican	January 5, 1885 – January 3, 1887	Santa Clara	
Samuel Rucker	Democratic	January 3, 1887 – January 7, 1889	Santa Clara	
Lyttleton Albert Whitehurst	Democratic	January 7, 1889 – January 5, 1891	Santa Clara	
George E. Hersey	Republican	January 5, 1891 – January 2, 1893	Santa Clara	
William H. Alford	Democratic	January 2, 1893 – January 7, 1895	Tulare	
David VanLear Robinson	Democratic	January 7, 1895 – January 4, 1897	Tulare	
William Pell Boone	Democratic	January 4, 1897 – January 1, 1901	Tulare	
Harry Levinson	Democratic	January 1, 1901 – January 5, 1903	Tulare	
Christopher Peter Pann	Republican	January 5, 1903 – January 2, 1905	Ventura	
David T. Perkins	Republican	January 2, 1905 – January 7, 1907	Ventura	
George Lincoln Sackett	Republican	January 7, 1907 – January 2, 1911	Ventura	
David Wallace Mott	Republican	January 2, 1911 – January 6, 1913	Ventura	
Charles W. Kingsley	Socialist	January 6, 1913 – January 4, 1915	Los Angeles	
Peter C. Phillips	Republican	January 4, 1915 – January 6, 1919	Los Angeles	
George M. Easton	Republican	January 6, 1919 – January 3, 1921	Los Angeles	
Joseph L. Pedrotti	Republican	January 3, 1921 – January 5, 1925	Los Angeles	
Thomas L. Dodge	Republican	January 5, 1925 – January 3, 1927	Los Angeles	
Willis M. Baum	Republican	January 3, 1927 – January 5, 1931	Los Angeles	
Sam M. Greene	Republican	January 5, 1931 – January 2, 1933	Los Angeles	
Herbert S. Hallner	Democratic	January 2, 1933 – January 7, 1935	Los Angeles	
Gene Flint	Democratic	January 7, 1935 – January 2, 1939	Los Angeles	
John W. Evans	Democratic	January 2, 1939 – January 3, 1955	Los Angeles	Ran as a Republican during his 6th term.
John W. Evans	Republican	January 2, 1939 – January 3, 1955	Los Angeles	Ran as a Republican during his 6th term.
Jesse M. Unruh	Democratic	January 3, 1955 – January 4, 1971	Los Angeles	
David C. Pierson	Democratic	January 4, 1971 – January 8, 1973	Los Angeles	
Frank Holoman	Democratic	January 8, 1973 – November 30, 1974	Los Angeles	
Bill McVittie	Democratic	December 2, 1974 – November 30, 1980	Los Angeles, San Bernardino	
Jim Cramer	Democratic	December 1, 1980 – November 30, 1982	Los Angeles, San Bernardino	
Charles W. Bader	Republican	December 6, 1982 – November 30, 1990	Los Angeles, San Bernardino	
Jim Brulte	Republican	December 3, 1990 – November 30, 1992	Los Angeles, San Bernardino	
Paul A. Woodruff	Republican	December 7, 1992 – November 30, 1994	Riverside, San Bernardino	
Brett Granlund	Republican	December 5, 1994 – November 30, 2000	Riverside, San Bernardino	
Vacant		November 30, 2000 – April 5, 2001	Riverside, San Bernardino	Janice C. Leja was elected to the seat, but agreed not to assume her seat as part of a settlement with the Attorney General's office, in addition to pleading guilty to misdemeanor violations in relation to campaign finance reporting.
Russ Bogh	Republican	April 5, 2001 – November 30, 2006	Riverside, San Bernardino	Sworn in after winning special election to fill in seat that was vacant.
Paul Cook	Republican	December 4, 2006 – November 30, 2012	Riverside, San Bernardino	
Sharon Quirk-Silva	Democratic	December 3, 2012 – November 30, 2014	Orange	
Young Kim	Republican	December 1, 2014 – November 30, 2016	Orange	
Sharon Quirk-Silva	Democratic	December 5, 2016 – November 30, 2022	Orange	Redistricted to the 67th State Assembly district.
Mike Gipson	Democratic	December 5, 2022 – present	Los Angeles	Redistricted from the 64th State Assembly district.

== Election results (1990–present) ==
=== 2024 ===
2024 California State Assembly 65th district election
Primary election
Party	Candidate	Votes	%
Democratic	Mike Gipson (incumbent)	38,702	99.6
Republican	Lydia Gutierrez (write-in)	152	0.4
Total votes		38,854	100.0
General election
Democratic	Mike Gipson (incumbent)	92,246	70.9
Republican	Lydia Gutierrez	37,946	29.1
Total votes		130,192	100.0
Democratic hold			

=== 2022 ===
2022 California State Assembly 65th district election
Primary election
Party	Candidate	Votes	%
Democratic	Mike Gipson (incumbent)	28,801	68.0
Democratic	Fatima Iqbal-Zubair	13,162	31.1
Republican	Lydia Gutierrez (write-in)	414	1.0
Total votes		42,377	100.0
General election
Democratic	Mike Gipson (incumbent)	43,118	61.7
Democratic	Fatima Iqbal-Zubair	26,719	38.3
Total votes		69,837	100.0
Democratic hold			

=== 2020 ===
2020 California State Assembly 65th district election
Primary election
Party	Candidate	Votes	%
Democratic	Sharon Quirk-Silva (incumbent)	54,240	57.7
Republican	Cynthia Thacker	39,796	42.3
Total votes		94,036	100.0
General election
Democratic	Sharon Quirk-Silva (incumbent)	112,333	58.3
Republican	Cynthia Thacker	80,468	41.7
Total votes		192,801	100.0
Democratic hold			

=== 2018 ===
2018 California State Assembly 65th district election
Primary election
Party	Candidate	Votes	%
Democratic	Sharon Quirk-Silva (incumbent)	37,587	52.9
Republican	Alexandria "Alex" Coronado	33,459	47.1
Total votes		71,046	100.0
General election
Democratic	Sharon Quirk-Silva (incumbent)	74,636	57.2
Republican	Alexandria "Alex" Coronado	55,953	42.8
Total votes		130,589	100.0
Democratic hold			

=== 2016 ===
2016 California State Assembly 65th district election
Primary election
Party	Candidate	Votes	%
Democratic	Sharon Quirk-Silva	42,890	54.3
Republican	Young Kim (incumbent)	36,028	45.7
Total votes		78,918	100.0
General election
Democratic	Sharon Quirk-Silva	79,654	53.2
Republican	Young Kim (incumbent)	69,941	46.8
Total votes		149,595	100.0
Democratic gain from Republican			

=== 2014 ===
2014 California State Assembly 65th district election
Primary election
Party	Candidate	Votes	%
Republican	Young Kim	21,593	54.7
Democratic	Sharon Quirk-Silva (incumbent)	17,896	45.3
Total votes		39,489	100.0
General election
Republican	Young Kim	42,376	54.6
Democratic	Sharon Quirk-Silva (incumbent)	35,204	45.4
Total votes		77,580	100.0
Republican gain from Democratic			

=== 2012 ===
2012 California State Assembly 65th district election
Primary election
Party	Candidate	Votes	%
Republican	Chris Norby (incumbent)	29,917	58.8
Democratic	Sharon Quirk-Silva	20,936	41.2
Total votes		50,853	100.0
General election
Democratic	Sharon Quirk-Silva	68,988	52.0
Republican	Chris Norby (incumbent)	63,576	48.0
Total votes		132,564	100.0
Democratic gain from Republican			

=== 2010 ===
2010 California State Assembly 65th district election
Party	Candidate	Votes	%
Republican	Paul Cook (incumbent)	78,475	57.9
Democratic	Carl Wood	57,212	42.1
Total votes		135,687	100.0
Republican hold			

=== 2008 ===
2008 California State Assembly 65th district election
Party	Candidate	Votes	%
Republican	Paul Cook (incumbent)	93,566	53.2
Democratic	Carl Wood	82,305	46.8
Total votes		175,871	100.0
Republican hold			

=== 2006 ===
2006 California State Assembly 65th district election
Party	Candidate	Votes	%
Republican	Paul Cook	67,669	59.9
Democratic	Rita Ramirez-Dean	41,906	37.1
Peace and Freedom	Jon Taleb	3,358	3.0
Total votes		112,933	100.0
Republican hold			

=== 2004 ===
2004 California State Assembly 65th district election
Party	Candidate	Votes	%
Republican	Russ Bogh (incumbent)	93,676	61.6
Democratic	Rita Ramirez-Dean	58,454	38.4
Total votes		152,130	100.0
Republican hold			

=== 2002 ===
2002 California State Assembly 65th district election
Party	Candidate	Votes	%
Republican	Russ Bogh (incumbent)	56,598	63.4
Democratic	Darrel R. Scholes	32,749	36.6
Total votes		89,347	100.0
Republican hold			

=== 2001 (special) ===
2001 California State Assembly 65th district special election Vacancy resulting from the resignation of Janice C. Leja
Party	Candidate	Votes	%
Republican	Russ Bogh	17,792	52.4
Democratic	Ray Quinto	16,170	47.6
Total votes		33,962	100.0
Republican hold			

=== 2000 ===
2000 California State Assembly 65th district election
Party	Candidate	Votes	%
Republican	Janice C. Leja	58,750	47.1
Democratic	Ray R. Quinto	53,425	42.8
Libertarian	Bonnie Flickinger	10,263	8.2
Natural Law	Joseph Ray Renteria	2,399	1.9
Total votes		124,837	100.0
Republican hold			

=== 1998 ===
1998 California State Assembly 65th district election
Party	Candidate	Votes	%
Republican	Brett Granlund (incumbent)	56,523	57.1
Democratic	Ray R. Quinto	39,286	39.7
Natural Law	Joseph "Ray" Renteria	3,144	3.2
Total votes		98,953	100.0
Republican hold			

=== 1996 ===
1996 California State Assembly 65th district election
Party	Candidate	Votes	%
Republican	Brett Granlund (incumbent)	66,573	56.6
Democratic	Shirley A. Morton	45,559	38.8
Natural Law	Douglas R. Wallack	5,344	4.5
No party	David William O'Brien (write-in)	63	0.1
Total votes		117,539	100.0
Republican hold			

=== 1994 ===
1994 California State Assembly 65th district election
Party	Candidate	Votes	%
Republican	Brett Granlund	64,291	63.1
Democratic	Richard D. Sandoval	37,550	36.9
Total votes		101,841	100.0
Republican hold			

=== 1992 ===
1992 California State Assembly 65th district election
Party	Candidate	Votes	%
Republican	Paul A. Woodruff (incumbent)	68,768	52.5
Democratic	Alice J. Robb	50,768	38.7
Libertarian	Michael S. Geller	11,575	8.8
Total votes		131,111	100.0
Republican hold			

=== 1990 ===
1990 California State Assembly 65th district election
Party	Candidate	Votes	%
Republican	Jim Brulte	57,331	59.9
Democratic	Bob Erwin	38,358	40.1
Total votes		95,689	100.0
Republican hold			

== See also ==
- California State Assembly
- California State Assembly districts
- Districts in California
