= Art Alive! =

1991 video game

- North American cover art
- Developers: Western Technologies; FarSight Technologies
- Publisher: Sega
- Programmers: Jay Obernolte; Chris Ziomkowski
- Artist: Eric Iwasaki
- Composer: Eric Iwasaki
- Platform: Sega Genesis
- Release: NA: 1991; JP: March 27, 1992; EU: March 1992
- Genre: Educational game
- Mode: Single-player

Art Alive! is a paint video game released by Sega for the Sega Genesis in 1991.

== Gameplay ==
Its features include stamps of Sonic the Hedgehog, ToeJam & Earl, and other Sega characters. It was followed by Sega's Wacky Worlds Creativity Studio in 1994.

== Reception ==
Entertainment Weekly gave the game a C+ and wrote that "More of a toy than a game, Sega's draw-and-paint program is pretty colorless compared with what you can accomplish on some mid-range personal computers, but it's still a welcome alternative to those burnt out on mindless shoot-'em-ups."

== See also ==
- Mario Paint
