= William H. Alford =

American politician (1866–1907)

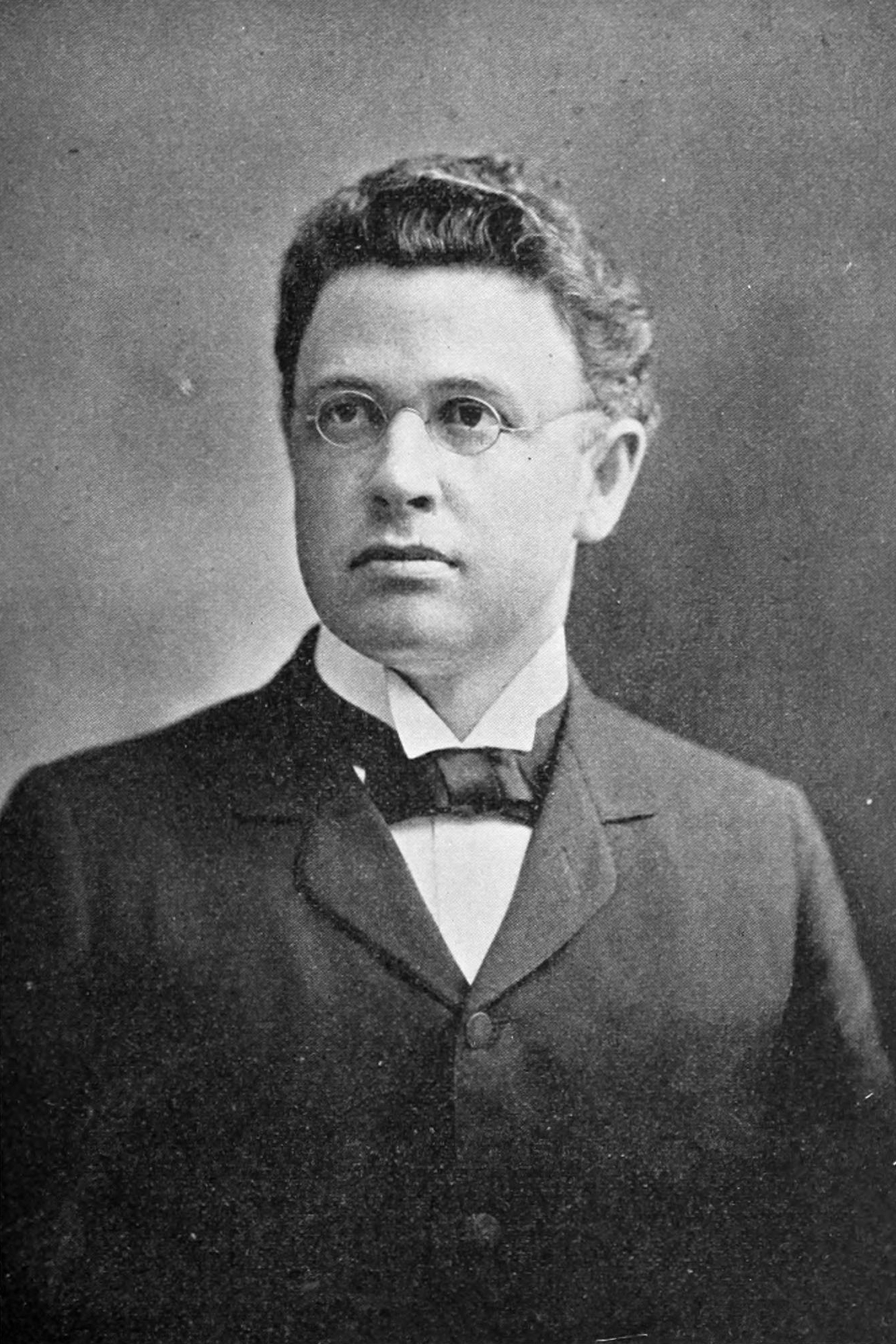
- Alford c. 1897

Member of the California State Board of Equalization from the 1st district
- In office January 7, 1903 – January 9, 1907
- Preceded by: J. G. Edwards
- Succeeded by: Joseph H. Scott

Chairman of the California Democratic Party
- In office July 18, 1896 – September 7, 1898
- Preceded by: Ben F. Maddox
- Succeeded by: Seth Mann

Member of the California State Assembly from the 65th district
- In office January 2, 1893 – January 7, 1895
- Preceded by: George E. Hersey
- Succeeded by: David VanLear Robinson

Personal details
- Born: September 14, 1866 Bowie County, Texas, U.S.
- Died: April 4, 1907 (aged 40) San Francisco, California, U.S.
- Party: Democratic
- Education: Read law
- Occupation: Attorney, politician

William Hays Alford (September 14, 1866 – April 4, 1907) was an American attorney and politician who served in the California State Assembly from 1893 to 1895, as chairman of the California Democratic Party from 1896 to 1898, and on the California State Board of Equalization from 1903 to 1907. He also served as assistant district attorney of Tulare County from 1888 to 1892 and San Francisco from 1900 to 1903. He was a candidate for Congress in California's 7th district in 1894, losing to incumbent Republican William W. Bowers.

== Sources ==
- Leonard, John W. (1906). Who's Who in America. Chicago: A.N. Marquis Company. p. 24.
