= Jay Obernolte =

American politician (born 1970)

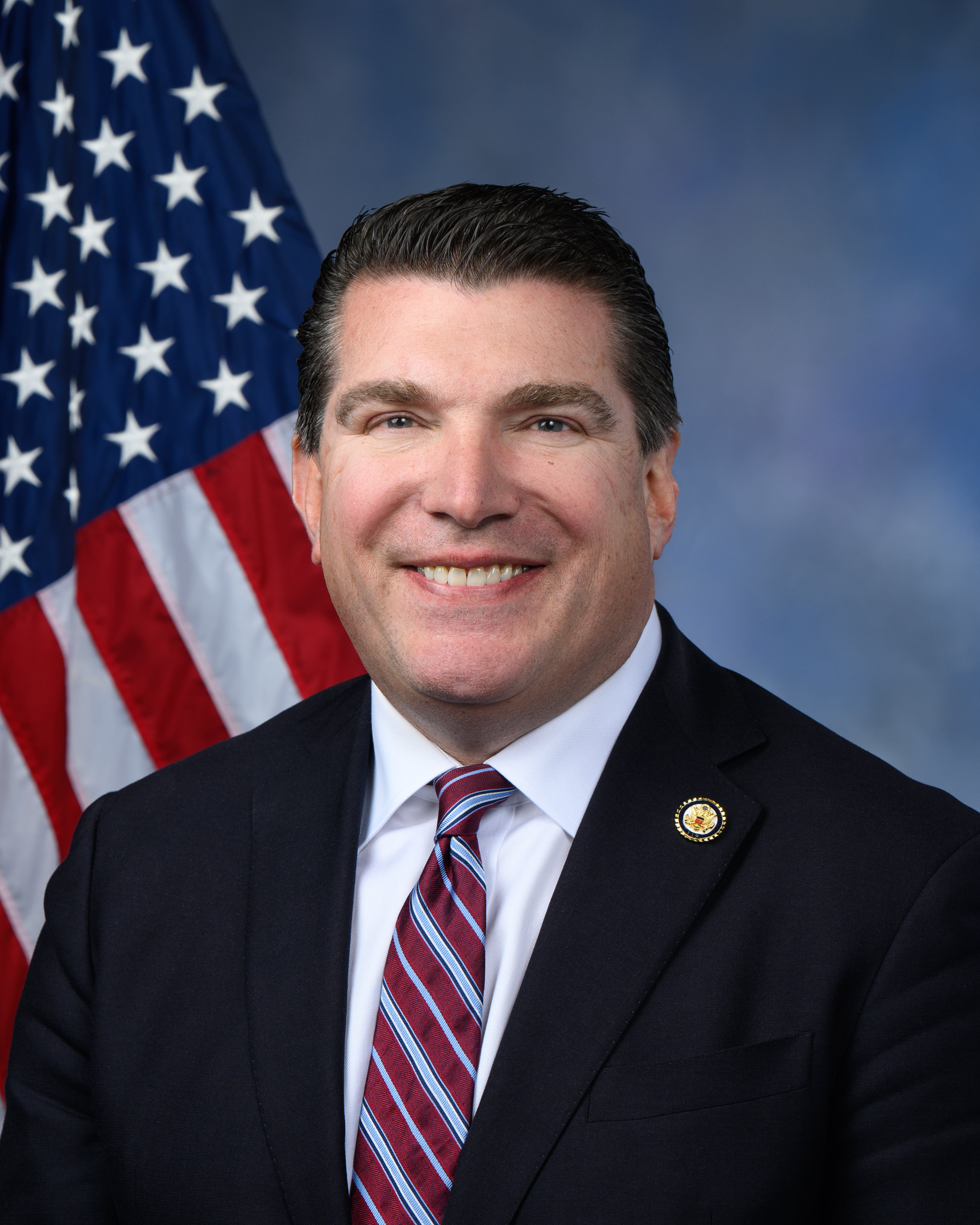
- Official portrait, 2025

Chair of the House Republican Policy Committee
- Incumbent
- Assumed office April 15, 2026
- Leader: Mike Johnson
- Preceded by: Kevin Hern

Member of the U.S. House of Representatives from California
- Incumbent
- Assumed office January 3, 2021
- Preceded by: Paul Cook
- Constituency: 8th district (2021–2023); 23rd district (2023–present)

Member of the California State Assembly from the 33rd district
- In office December 1, 2014 – November 30, 2020
- Preceded by: Tim Donnelly
- Succeeded by: Thurston Smith

Personal details
- Born: Jay Phillip Obernolte; August 18, 1970 (age 56) Chicago, Illinois, U.S.
- Party: Republican
- Spouse: Heather Obernolte (m. 1996)
- Children: 2
- Education: California Institute of Technology (BS); University of California, Los Angeles (MS); California Baptist University (DPA)
- Website: House website Campaign website

Jay Phillip Obernolte (/ˈoʊbərˌnoʊlti/ OH-bər-NOHL-tee; born August 18, 1970) is an American politician and businessman serving as the U.S. representative for California's 23rd district since 2021, when it was numbered as the 8th district. A Republican, he was previously a member of the California State Assembly representing the 33rd district. Before serving in the Assembly, Obernolte served on the city council and was the mayor of Big Bear Lake, California. He is the owner, president, and technical director of FarSight Studios, an American video game developer.

Obernolte is the only Republican to represent a district with area in Los Angeles County.

== Early life and education ==
Obernolte was born in Chicago, Illinois, and raised in Fresno, California. He graduated as valedictorian of Edison/Computech High School in 1988. In 1992, he obtained his Bachelor of Science degree in engineering and applied science from the California Institute of Technology and in 1997, he received his Master of Science in artificial intelligence from the University of California, Los Angeles. In 2020, he was awarded a Doctorate in Public Administration from the California Baptist University with a dissertation on "Managing Budgetary Conflict Between the Executive and Legislative Branches of Government".

== Career ==
=== Business ===
In 1990, Obernolte launched FarSight Studios, an independent developer and publisher of family-friendly video games. The company originally produced games for the Nintendo Entertainment System, and as of 2023 develops for PlayStation 4, Xbox One, Nintendo Switch, Oculus, Windows, macOS, iOS and Android. Notable games the studio has developed include Scarface: Money. Power. Respect., Color a Dinosaur, Game Party, Hotel for Dogs, The Pinball Arcade, and the Sega Genesis version of Action 52. FarSight Studios claims Sony, Microsoft, Google, and Apple among its clients and employs 25 workers.

=== Politics ===
In 2005, Obernolte was elected to the Big Bear City Airport Board, where he served for five years. He then served as president of the board for three years and as vice president for one year.

In 2010, Obernolte was elected to Big Bear City Council, where he served as mayor. He also served on the Big Bear Lake Fire Protection Board, as director of the Mojave Desert and on the Mountain Integrated Waste JPA Board, the Mountain Area Regional Transit Authority Board, and the League of California Cities Desert-Mountain Division.

Obernolte served as state assemblyman for California's 33rd State Assembly district, which encompasses a wide expanse of the High Desert (areas of the Mojave Desert), from the eastern fringes of the Los Angeles metropolitan area to the Nevada and Arizona borders, from 2014 to 2020. He was elected to Congress in 2020 to replace retiring Paul Cook as representative for California's 8th congressional district, which includes Mono County, Inyo County, and the majority of land mass in San Bernardino County.

=== California State Assembly ===
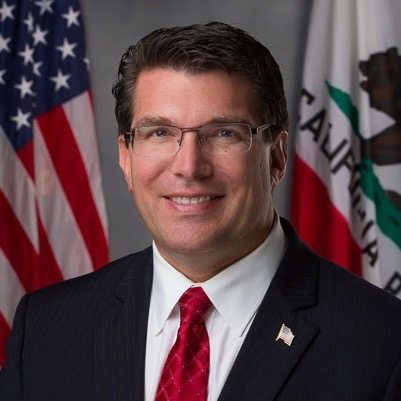
Obernolte during his tenure in the California state assembly

In January 2016, Obernolte was elected to serve on the California Legislative Technology and Innovation Caucus, which is co-chaired by Assembly members Ian Calderon and Evan Low. He also sat on the following committees: Arts, Entertainment, Sports, Tourism, and Internet Media as vice chair; Budget as vice chair; Appropriations; Budget Subcommittee 6 on Budget Process, Oversight and Program Evaluation; Budget Subcommittee 6 on Budget Process, Oversight and Program Evaluation; Utilities and Commerce; Joint Committee on Arts; and Joint Legislative Budget.

In 2016, Obernolte expressed concern over Frontier Communications's acquisition of Verizon's voice, video, data, and FiOS network, saying that the takeover "negatively affected" his constituents through poor landline telephone service.

In 2016, Obernolte introduced Assembly Bill 2341, which would provide San Bernardino and other rural counties with additional judges to resolve backlogged court systems. The bill would have shifted seats from Santa Clara and Alameda counties to the rural counties including San Bernardino, but died in the Senate Appropriations Committee without a hearing.

In 2017, Obernolte opposed Xavier Becerra's nomination as California Attorney General.

Obernolte said that Governor Jerry Brown's $179.45 billion budget proposal was "responsible", but expressed a preference for fixing existing programs over creating new ones. He also stated an interest in funding job skills training, improving the state's Denti-Cal program, repairing infrastructure, and working on the housing crisis. Obernolte pushed for lawmakers to limit long-term funding commitments and said the budget proposal did nothing to address the "state's out-of-control pension debts and retiree health care liabilities."

Obernolte co-authored Assembly Bill 1103, which would have allowed California bicyclists to roll through stop signs if it was safe to do so (the "Idaho stop"). The bill died in committee.

Obernolte authored Assembly Bill 1642, which would extend the deadlines to either pay the fire tax, which is a state fire prevention fee, or file a petition for redetermination from 30 days to 60 days. In July 2017, the fire fee was suspended as part of Assembly Bill 398. Obernolte opposed raising fire insurance costs, which is calculated by factors in the risk of wildfire, fuels, slope and road access for emergency vehicles.

Obernolte opposed increases in the minimum wage.

== U.S. House of Representatives ==
=== Elections ===
==== 2020 ====
In September 2019, after Paul Cook announced his retirement from California's 8th congressional district, Obernolte announced his candidacy. The district covers most of the High Desert of San Bernardino County and Mono and Inyo counties.

In February 2020, President Donald Trump endorsed Obernolte on Twitter.

In the November 2020 election, Obernolte defeated Democratic nominee Chris Bubser with 56.1% of the vote to Bubser's 43.9%. Obernolte was sworn in to Congress on January 3, 2021, and appointed Freshman Class Representative to the House Republican Policy Committee.

2020 California's 8th congressional district primary results by county Map legend: Obernolte—30–40%; Bubser—30–40%; Bubser—40–50%

California's 8th congressional district, 2020
Primary election
Party	Candidate	Votes	%
Republican	Jay Obernolte	50,677	35.0
Democratic	Christine Bubser	41,595	28.7
Republican	Tim Donnelly	30,079	20.7
Democratic	Bob Conaway	9,053	6.2
No party preference	Jeff Esmus	4,042	2.8
Democratic	James Ellars	3,948	2.7
Republican	Jeremy Staat	2,288	1.6
Republican	Jerry Laws	2,010	1.4
Republican	Justin David Whitehead	1,305	0.9
No party preference	J. Green (write-in)	11	0.0
Total votes		145,008	100.0
General election
Republican	Jay Obernolte	158,711	56.1
Democratic	Christine Bubser	124,400	43.9
Total votes		283,111	100.0
Republican hold			

=== Tenure ===
On January 6, 2021, Obernolte voted not to count Arizona's and Pennsylvania's electoral votes in the 2020 United States presidential election, citing unilateral changes to election law made in those states by the judiciary or executive branch rather than the state legislature. He also voted against impeaching Trump for inciting his supporters to attack the Capitol on January 6. Obernolte voted against the creation of the January 6 commission.

In February 2021, Obernolte voted against the resolution that stripped Marjorie Taylor Greene of her committee assignments for her incendiary and violent statements. In November 2021, he voted against censuring Representative Paul Gosar, who posted an edited video of himself violently attacking Representative Alexandria Ocasio-Cortez and President Biden.

In March 2021, he voted against the American Rescue Plan Act.

In June 2021, Obernolte voted to repeal the Authorization for Use of Military Force Against Iraq Resolution of 2002.

As of October 2021, Obernolte had voted in line with Joe Biden's stated position 20% of the time.

Along with Ted Lieu, Obernolte began chairing a bipartisan taskforce on artificial intelligence in 2024.

On April 15, 2026, Obernolte was elected GOP conference policy chair, a senior Republican leadership position responsible for policy development.

In 2025, Obernolte praised Elon Musk, amid the attempts of his "Department of Government Efficiency" to fire a substantial part of the federal workforce, for “looking at all of the waste" in the federal government.

=== Committee assignments ===
For the 119th Congress:

- Committee on Energy and Commerce
  - Subcommittee on Commerce Manufacturing, and Trade
  - Subcommittee on Communications and Technology
  - Subcommittee on Health
- Committee on Science, Space, and Technology
  - Subcommittee on Research and Technology
- Committee on the Budget

=== Caucus memberships ===
- House Republican Policy Committee
  - Chairman (119th Congress)
- Republican Study Committee
- Republican Governance Group
- Main Street Caucus
- Congressional Western Caucus

== Political positions ==
Obernolte supported the overturning of Roe v. Wade and believes that because the Constitution does not mention abortion explicitly, states may outlaw it.

On July 19, 2022, Obernolte and 46 other Republican representatives voted for the Respect for Marriage Act, which would codify the right to same-sex marriage in federal law. He said, "As an ardent advocate for limited government, I do not feel that government should be empowered to dictate the terms of a marriage."

In 2022, Obernolte was one of 39 Republicans to vote for the Merger Filing Fee Modernization Act of 2022, an antitrust package that would crack down on corporations for anti-competitive behavior.

In 2023, Obernolte was among 47 Republicans to vote in favor of H.Con.Res. 21, which directed President Joe Biden to remove U.S. troops from Syria within 180 days.

== Electoral history ==
=== 2014 California State Assembly election ===
On February 10, 2014, Obernolte announced his candidacy for the California State Assembly to succeed Tim Donnelly in the 33rd district.

Obernolte was endorsed by the California Republican Party, the San Bernardino County Republican party, the California Republican Assembly, The Press-Enterprise, the Howard Jarvis Taxpayers Association, Peace Officers Research Association of California (PORAC), San Bernardino County Safety Employee's Benefit Association (SEBA), the California Conservative Christians, and the Independent Voter Political Action Committee.

In the June primary, Obernolte finished second with 18.89% of the vote with 7,887 votes. He defeated Democrat John Coffey in the November general election with 65.9% of the vote.

2014 California's 33rd State Assembly district election
Primary election
Party	Candidate	Votes	%
Democratic	John Coffey	9,865	23.1
Republican	Jay Obernolte	8,028	18.8
Republican	Michelle Ambrozic	7,566	17.7
Republican	Rick Roelle	6,574	15.4
Republican	Art Bishop	5,956	14.0
Republican	Brett Savage	1,811	4.2
Republican	Scott Markovich	975	2.3
Republican	Jerry J. Laws	814	1.9
Republican	Robert J. "Bob" Burhle	802	1.9
Republican	Robert Larivee	299	0.7
Total votes		45,690	100.0
General election
Republican	Jay Obernolte	46,144	65.9
Democratic	John Coffey	23,828	34.1
Total votes		69,972	100.0
Republican hold			

=== 2016 California State Assembly election ===
On January 25, 2016, Obernolte announced he would seek reelection as the representative for California's 33rd Assembly District.

In the June primary, Obernolte finished first with 60.7% of the vote with 43,526 votes. He defeated Democrat Scott Markovich in the November general election with 60.6% of the vote.

2016 California's 33rd State Assembly district election
Primary election
Party	Candidate	Votes	%
Republican	Jay Obernolte (incumbent)	43,526	60.7
Democratic	Scott Markovich	28,220	39.3
Total votes		71,746	100.0
General election
Republican	Jay Obernolte (incumbent)	84,000	60.6
Democratic	Scott Markovich	56,086	39.4
Total votes		140,086	100.0
Republican hold			

=== 2018 California State Assembly election ===
2018 California's 33rd State Assembly district election
Primary election
Party	Candidate	Votes	%
Republican	Jay Obernolte (incumbent)	43,100	65.8
Democratic	Socorro Cisneros	12,566	19.2
Democratic	Scott Markovich	9,854	15.0
Total votes		65,520	100.0
General election
Republican	Jay Obernolte (incumbent)	72,109	60.2
Democratic	Socorro Cisneros	47,603	39.8
Total votes		119,712	100.0
Republican hold			

=== 2022 California congressional election ===
California's 23rd congressional district, 2022
Primary election
Party	Candidate	Votes	%
Republican	Jay Obernolte (incumbent)	57,988	60.9
Democratic	Derek Marshall	20,776	21.8
Democratic	Bianca A. Gómez	16,516	17.3
Total votes		95,280	100.0
General election
Republican	Jay Obernolte (incumbent)	102,733	61.0%
Democratic	Derek Marshall	65,655	39.0%
Total votes		168,388	100.0
Republican hold			

=== 2024 California congressional election ===
California's 23rd congressional district, 2024
Primary election
Party	Candidate	Votes	%
Republican	Jay Obernolte (incumbent)	70,208	63.4
Democratic	Derek Marshall	40,477	36.6
Total votes		110,685	100.0
General election
Republican	Jay Obernolte (incumbent)	159,286	60.1
Democratic	Derek Marshall	105,563	39.9
Total votes		264,849	100.0
Republican hold			

== Personal life ==
Obernolte married his wife, Heather, in 1996, and they have two sons. The family has lived in Big Bear Lake since 1997.

Obernolte holds an airline transport pilot's license. He is a certified flight instructor and has flown light aircraft since 2005. He worked with Embraer as a member on its Pilot Advisory Board during the development of the Phenom 300. Obernolte volunteers as a pilot with the Veterans Airlift Command and the Young Eagles.

Obernolte holds a fifth-degree black belt in Pacific Unified Martial Arts and is co-owner and instructor at PUMA Karate in Big Bear Lake.

Obernolte is Protestant.

U.S. House of Representatives
Preceded by Paul Cook	Member of the U.S. House of Representatives from California's 8th congressional district 2021–2023	Succeeded by John Garamendi
Preceded by Kevin McCarthy	Member of the U.S. House of Representatives from California's 23rd congressional district 2023–present	Incumbent
New office	Chair of the House Artificial Intelligence Task Force; 2024–2025	Position abolished
Party political offices
Preceded by Kevin Hern	Chair of the House Republican Policy Committee; 2026–present	Incumbent
U.S. order of precedence (ceremonial)
Preceded by Troy Nehls	United States representatives by seniority 270th	Succeeded by Burgess Owens
