= Game Party =

2007 video game

- PAL cover art
- Developer: FarSight Studios
- Publisher: Midway Games
- Platform: Wii
- Release: NA: November 27, 2007; EU: February 15, 2008
- Genre: Party
- Modes: Single-player, multiplayer

Game Party is a 2007 party video game developed by FarSight Studios. Game Party was released as a budget title for the Wii. It is the first game in the Game Party series. Midway Games published the game in North America on November 27, 2007, and in Europe on February 15, 2008. It received negative reviews from critics.

== Development ==
In 2006, Midway Games teamed up with FarSight Studios to create a minigame collection only for the Wii. The game began development in March 2007 and was completed in November. A 100-page document describing details of the game was used during development. It is designed so that it can be played by small children, to broaden the family market for the game. Before the game's release, Midway announced that Game Party would be a budget title. The game was released in North America on November 27, 2007, by Warner Bros. Interactive Entertainment, and was released in Europe on February 15, 2008, by Midway.

== Gameplay ==
Game Party features a collection of classic skill games from around the world, from American sports venues to European gathering spots. Using the Wii's unique control interface, the player can compete in games such as darts, ping cup, shuffle board, skill ball, air hockey, and hoop shoot; or participate in multiplayer trivia contests. The player can earn tickets to unlock new minigames, characters, tables, etc.

== Reception ==
Game Party received "generally unfavorable" reviews according to review aggregator Metacritic, which gave the game a weighted average score of 25 out of 100, based on eight reviews. IGN gave the game an "Awful" rating of 3.2 out of 10, writing: "Wii's success is bound to bring on a wave of shovelware that most serious gamers have learned to completely ignore over the years," criticizing the graphics and the mini-games.

Many game websites gave the game a 1 out of 10: Eurogamer criticized the graphics and the fun factor of the game, saying: "The Game Party experience is like going to a party where there's nothing to drink but Tesco Value brandy and there are only four other guests and they're all racist and then your ex turns up and gets off with a Danish supermodel."

== Sales ==
Initial sales were higher than anticipated. The first Game Party received a "Platinum" sales award from the Entertainment and Leisure Software Publishers Association (ELSPA), indicating sales of at least 300,000 copies in the United Kingdom.

On February 12, 2009, Midway announced the Game Party series had sold over 3 million units.

== Sequels ==
On April 18, 2008, Midway announced a sequel - Game Party 2, at their Gamer Day event in Las Vegas. The game was released on October 6, 2008, for the Wii, and was released in Europe and Australia as More Game Party.

On April 6, 2009, Midway announced Game Party 3 during their 10-K filing. Following Midway's bankruptcy, Warner Bros. Interactive Entertainment purchased a majority of Midway's former assets, including the Game Party franchise and released the game for the Wii on October 6, 2009.

Other titles in the series include Game Party: In Motion for the Xbox 360 Kinect, and Game Party Champions for the Wii U.
