= Game Party: In Motion =

2010 video game

- European box art
- Developer: FarSight Studios
- Publisher: Warner Bros. Interactive Entertainment
- Platform: Xbox 360
- Release: NA: November 18, 2010; EU: November 26, 2010; AU: December 9, 2010
- Genre: Party Game
- Modes: Single-player, multiplayer

Game Party: In Motion is the fourth video game in the Game Party series developed by FarSight Studios and published by Warner Bros. Interactive. As with its predecessors, In Motion is a budget title aimed towards multiplayer casual gaming with various mini-games. The game debuted during the Kinect launch and received poor reviews.

== Mini-games ==
- Horseshoes
- Bocce Ball
- Soccer
- Double Racquets
- Bean Bag Toss
- Hoop Shoot
- Skill ball (skee ball)
- Smack a Troll
- Air Hockey
- Tic-Tac-Toe Faceoff

== Reception ==
Metacritic lists the game as having an average score of 33/100, indicating "generally unfavorable reviews".
