= California State Legislature, 2017–2018 session =

2017–18 session of the California State Legislature
←	2015–2016	2019–2020	→
- The Seal of California

Overview
- Legislative body: California State Legislature
- Jurisdiction: California
- Term: December 5, 2016 – November 30, 2018

Senate
- Members: 40
- President of the Senate: Gavin Newsom (D); Dec. 5, 2016 – present
- President pro tempore: Kevin de León (D–24th) Dec. 5, 2016 – Mar. 21, 2018; Toni Atkins (D–39th) Mar. 21, 2018 – present
- Minority Leader: Jean Fuller (R–16th) Dec. 5, 2016 – Apr. 12, 2017; Patricia Bates (R–36th) Apr. 12, 2017 – present
- Party control: Democratic

Assembly
- Members: 80
- Speaker: Anthony Rendon (D–63rd); Dec. 5, 2016 – present
- Minority Leader: Chad Mayes (R–42nd) Dec. 5, 2016 – Sep. 18, 2017; Brian Dahle (R–1st) Sep. 18, 2017 – Nov. 8, 2018; Marie Waldron (R–75th) Nov. 8, 2018 – present
- Party control: Democratic

The 2017–18 session was a session of the California State Legislature. The session first convened on December 5, 2016, and adjourned sine die on November 30, 2018.

== Major events ==
=== Vacancies and special elections ===
- July 11, 2017: Democratic assemblymember Jimmy Gomez (51st–Echo Park) resigns to take a seat in Congress.
- November 27, 2017: Democratic assemblymember Raul Bocanegra (39th–Pacoima) resigns in the wake of sexual harassment allegations.
- December 16, 2017: Democrat Wendy Carrillo of Boyle Heights is sworn into office after winning the December 5, 2017, special election for the 51st State Assembly district to replace Gomez.
- December 31, 2017: Democratic assemblymember Sebastian Ridley-Thomas (54th–Los Angeles) resigns for health reasons.
- January 2, 2018: Democratic assemblymember Matt Dababneh (45th–Encino) resigns in the wake of sexual harassment allegations.
- February 22, 2018: Democratic senator Tony Mendoza (32nd–Artesia) resigns in the wake of sexual misconduct allegations.
- April 16, 2018: Democrat Sydney Kamlager of Los Angeles is sworn into office after winning the April 3, 2018, special election for the 54th State Assembly district to replace Ridley-Thomas.
- June 11, 2018: Democrat Luz Rivas of North Hollywood is sworn into office after winning the June 5, 2018, special election for the 39th State Assembly district to replace Bocanegra. Democrat Jesse Gabriel of Encino is sworn into office after winning the June 5, 2018, special election for the 45th State Assembly district to replace Dababneh.
- June 25, 2018: Republican Ling Ling Chang of Diamond Bar is sworn into office after Democrat Josh Newman was recalled in a June 5, 2018 recall election in the 29th State Senate district.
- August 14, 2018: Democrat Vanessa Delgado of Montebello is sworn into office after winning the August 7, 2018, special election for the 32nd State Senate district to replace Mendoza.

=== Leadership changes ===
- April 12, 2017: Republican senator Patricia Bates (36th–Laguna Niguel) replaces senator Jean Fuller (16th–Bakersfield) as Senate minority leader, as Fuller is termed out at the end of the session.
- September 18, 2017: Republican assemblymember Brian Dahle (1st–Bieber) replaces assemblymember Chad Mayes (42nd–Yucca Valley) as Assembly minority leader, as Mayes was ousted in the wake of his support for renewing California's cap-and-trade program.
- March 21, 2018: Democratic senator Toni Atkins (39th–San Diego) replaces senator Kevin de León (24th–Los Angeles) as president pro tempore, as de León is termed out at the end of the session.
- November 8, 2018: Republican assemblymember Marie Waldron (75th–Escondido) replaces assemblymember Brian Dahle (1st–Bieber) as Assembly minority leader, as Dahle planned to run in a special election for the California State Senate.

=== Legislation ===
- SB35 - streamlining housing construction in California counties and cities that fail to build enough housing to meet state mandated housing construction requirements.

== State Senate ==
Composition of the California State Senate Democratic Party Republican Party

↓
26	14
Democratic	Republican

Affiliation	Party (Shading indicates majority caucus)		Total	
Affiliation	Democratic	Republican	Total	Vacant
End of previous legislature	26	13	39	1
Begin	27	13	40	0
February 22, 2018	26	13	39	1
June 25, 2018	25	14	39	1
August 14, 2018	26	14	40	0
Latest voting share	65%	35%		

=== Officers ===
Position	Name	Party	District
Lieutenant Governor	Gavin Newsom	Democratic	
President pro tempore	Toni Atkins	Democratic	39th–San Diego
Majority leader	Bill Monning	Democratic	17th–Carmel
Majority whip	Nancy Skinner	Democratic	9th–Berkeley
Majority caucus chair	Connie Leyva	Democratic	20th–Chino
Majority caucus vice chair	Mike McGuire	Democratic	2nd–Healdsburg
Minority leader	Patricia Bates	Republican	36th–Laguna Niguel
Minority caucus chair	Jim Nielsen	Republican	4th–Gerber
Minority whip	Ted Gaines	Republican	1st–El Dorado Hills
Secretary	Daniel Alvarez		
Sergeant-at-Arms	Debbie Manning		
Chaplain	Sister Michelle Gorman		

The Secretary, the Sergeant-at-Arms, and the Chaplain are not members of the Legislature.

=== Members ===
District	Name	Party	Residence	Term-limited?	Notes
1	Ted Gaines	Republican	El Dorado Hills		
2	Mike McGuire	Democratic	Healdsburg		
3	Bill Dodd	Democratic	Napa		
4	Jim Nielsen	Republican	Gerber		
5	Cathleen Galgiani	Democratic	Stockton		
6	Richard Pan	Democratic	Sacramento		
7	Steve Glazer	Democratic	Orinda		
8	Tom Berryhill	Republican	Modesto	Yes	
9	Nancy Skinner	Democratic	Berkeley		
10	Bob Wieckowski	Democratic	Fremont		
11	Scott Wiener	Democratic	San Francisco		
12	Anthony Cannella	Republican	Ceres	Yes	
13	Jerry Hill	Democratic	San Mateo		
14	Andy Vidak	Republican	Hanford		
15	Jim Beall	Democratic	San Jose		
16	Jean Fuller	Republican	Bakersfield	Yes	Minority leader from August 27, 2015, to April 12, 2017
17	Bill Monning	Democratic	Carmel		
18	Robert Hertzberg	Democratic	Van Nuys		
19	Hannah-Beth Jackson	Democratic	Santa Barbara		
20	Connie Leyva	Democratic	Chino		
21	Scott Wilk	Republican	Santa Clarita		
22	Ed Hernandez	Democratic	West Covina	Yes	
23	Mike Morrell	Republican	Rancho Cucamonga		
24	Kevin de León	Democratic	Los Angeles	Yes	President pro tempore from October 15, 2014, to March 21, 2018
25	Anthony Portantino	Democratic	La Cañada Flintridge		
26	Ben Allen	Democratic	Santa Monica		
27	Henry Stern	Democratic	Canoga Park		
28	Jeff Stone	Republican	Temecula		
29	Josh Newman	Democratic	Fullerton		Recalled on June 5, 2018
29	Ling Ling Chang	Republican	Diamond Bar		Sworn in on June 25, 2018, to replace Newman
30	Holly Mitchell	Democratic	Los Angeles		
31	Richard Roth	Democratic	Riverside		
32	Tony Mendoza	Democratic	Artesia		Resigned on February 22, 2018
32	Vacant from February 22, 2018, to August 14, 2018				
32	Vanessa Delgado	Democratic	Montebello		Sworn into office on August 14, 2018
33	Ricardo Lara	Democratic	Bell Gardens		
34	Janet Nguyen	Republican	Fountain Valley		
35	Steven Bradford	Democratic	Gardena		
36	Patricia Bates	Republican	Laguna Niguel		Minority leader since April 12, 2017
37	John Moorlach	Republican	Costa Mesa		
38	Joel Anderson	Republican	Alpine	Yes	
39	Toni Atkins	Democratic	San Diego		President pro tempore since March 21, 2018
40	Ben Hueso	Democratic	San Diego		

== State Assembly ==
Composition of the California State Assembly Democratic Party Republican Party

↓
55	25
Democratic	Republican

Affiliation	Party (Shading indicates majority caucus)		Total	
Affiliation	Democratic	Republican	Total	Vacant
End of previous legislature	55	28	80	0
Begin	55	25	80	0
July 11, 2017	54	25	79	1
November 27, 2017	53	25	78	2
December 16, 2017	54	25	79	1
December 31, 2017	53	25	78	2
January 2, 2018	52	25	77	3
April 16, 2018	53	25	78	2
June 11, 2018	55	25	80	0
Latest voting share	68.8%	31.3%		

=== Officers ===
Position	Name	Party	District
Speaker	Anthony Rendon	Democratic	63rd–Lakewood
Speaker pro tempore	Kevin Mullin	Democratic	22nd–South San Francisco
Assistant speaker pro tempore	Laura Friedman	Democratic	43rd–Glendale
Majority leader	Ian Calderon	Democratic	57th–Whittier
Assistant majority leader	Rob Bonta	Democratic	18th–Alameda
Majority whip	Todd Gloria	Democratic	78th–San Diego
Assistant majority whip	Eloise Reyes	Democratic	47th–Grand Terrace
Majority caucus chair	Mike Gipson	Democratic	64th–Carson
Minority leader	Marie Waldron	Republican	75th–Escondido
Republican floor manager	Heath Flora	Republican	12th–Ripon
Deputy Republican leaders	Frank Bigelow	Republican	5th–O'Neals
Deputy Republican leaders	Rocky Chávez	Republican	76th–Oceanside
Assistant Republican leaders	Phillip Chen	Republican	55th–Diamond Bar
Assistant Republican leaders	Chad Mayes	Republican	42nd–Yucca Valley
Republican caucus chair	Jay Obernolte	Republican	33rd–Big Bear Lake
Chief Clerk	E. Dotson Wilson		
Chief Sergeant-at-Arms	Bryon G. Gustafson, Ph.D		
Chaplain	Reverend Bob Oshita		
Alternate Chaplain	Reverend Patti Oshita		

The Chief Clerk, the acting Chief Sergeant-at-Arms, and the Chaplains are not members of the Legislature.

=== Members ===
District	Name	Party	Residence	Term-limited?	Notes
1	Brian Dahle	Republican	Bieber		Minority leader from September 18, 2017, to November 8, 2018
2	Jim Wood	Democratic	Healdsburg		
3	James Gallagher	Republican	Nicolaus		
4	Cecilia Aguiar-Curry	Democratic	Winters		
5	Frank Bigelow	Republican	O'Neals		
6	Kevin Kiley	Republican	Rocklin		
7	Kevin McCarty	Democratic	Sacramento		
8	Ken Cooley	Democratic	Rancho Cordova		
9	Jim Cooper	Democratic	Elk Grove		
10	Marc Levine	Democratic	Greenbrae		
11	Jim Frazier	Democratic	Oakley		
12	Heath Flora	Republican	Ripon		
13	Susan Eggman	Democratic	Stockton		
14	Tim Grayson	Democratic	Concord		
15	Tony Thurmond	Democratic	Richmond		
16	Catharine Baker	Republican	Dublin		
17	David Chiu	Democratic	San Francisco		
18	Rob Bonta	Democratic	Alameda		
19	Phil Ting	Democratic	San Francisco		
20	Bill Quirk	Democratic	Hayward		
21	Adam Gray	Democratic	Merced		
22	Kevin Mullin	Democratic	South San Francisco		
23	Jim Patterson	Republican	Fresno		
24	Marc Berman	Democratic	Palo Alto		
25	Kansen Chu	Democratic	San Jose		
26	Devon Mathis	Republican	Visalia		
27	Ash Kalra	Democratic	San Jose		
28	Evan Low	Democratic	Campbell		
29	Mark Stone	Democratic	Scotts Valley		
30	Anna Caballero	Democratic	Salinas	Yes	
31	Joaquin Arambula	Democratic	Kingsburg		
32	Rudy Salas	Democratic	Bakersfield		
33	Jay Obernolte	Republican	Big Bear Lake		
34	Vince Fong	Republican	Bakersfield		
35	Jordan Cunningham	Republican	Templeton		
36	Tom Lackey	Republican	Palmdale		
37	Monique Limón	Democratic	Santa Barbara		
38	Dante Acosta	Republican	Santa Clarita		
39	Raul Bocanegra	Democratic	Pacoima		Resigned on November 27, 2017
39	Vacant from November 27, 2017, to June 11, 2018				
39	Luz Rivas	Democratic	North Hollywood		Sworn into office on June 11, 2018
40	Marc Steinorth	Republican	Rancho Cucamonga		
41	Chris Holden	Democratic	Pasadena		
42	Chad Mayes	Republican	Yucca Valley		Minority leader from January 4, 2016, to September 18, 2017
43	Laura Friedman	Democratic	Glendale		
44	Jacqui Irwin	Democratic	Thousand Oaks		
45	Matt Dababneh	Democratic	Encino		Resigned on January 2, 2018
45	Vacant from January 2, 2018, to June 11, 2018				
45	Jesse Gabriel	Democratic	Encino		Sworn into office on June 11, 2018
46	Adrin Nazarian	Democratic	Sherman Oaks		
47	Eloise Reyes	Democratic	Grand Terrace		
48	Blanca Rubio	Democratic	Baldwin Park		
49	Ed Chau	Democratic	Monterey Park		
50	Richard Bloom	Democratic	Santa Monica		
51	Jimmy Gomez	Democratic	Echo Park		Resigned on July 11, 2017
51	Vacant from July 11, 2017 to December 16, 2017				
51	Wendy Carrillo	Democratic	Boyle Heights		Sworn into office on December 16, 2017
52	Freddie Rodriguez	Democratic	Pomona		
53	Miguel Santiago	Democratic	Los Angeles		
54	Sebastian Ridley-Thomas	Democratic	Los Angeles		Resigned on December 31, 2017
54	Vacant from December 31, 2017, to April 16, 2018				
54	Sydney Kamlager	Democratic	Los Angeles		Sworn into office on April 16, 2018
55	Phillip Chen	Republican	Diamond Bar		
56	Eduardo Garcia	Democratic	Coachella		
57	Ian Calderon	Democratic	Whittier		
58	Cristina Garcia	Democratic	Bell Gardens		
59	Reggie Jones-Sawyer	Democratic	Los Angeles		
60	Sabrina Cervantes	Democratic	Riverside		
61	Jose Medina	Democratic	Riverside		
62	Autumn Burke	Democratic	Marina del Rey		
63	Anthony Rendon	Democratic	Lakewood		Speaker
64	Mike Gipson	Democratic	Carson		
65	Sharon Quirk-Silva	Democratic	Fullerton		
66	Al Muratsuchi	Democratic	Rolling Hills Estates		
67	Melissa Melendez	Republican	Lake Elsinore		
68	Steven Choi	Republican	Irvine		
69	Tom Daly	Democratic	Anaheim		
70	Patrick O'Donnell	Democratic	Long Beach		
71	Randy Voepel	Republican	Santee		
72	Travis Allen	Republican	Huntington Beach		
73	Bill Brough	Republican	Dana Point		
74	Matthew Harper	Republican	Huntington Beach		
75	Marie Waldron	Republican	Escondido		Minority leader since November 8, 2018
76	Rocky Chávez	Republican	Oceanside		
77	Brian Maienschein	Republican	San Diego		
78	Todd Gloria	Democratic	San Diego		
79	Shirley Weber	Democratic	San Diego		
80	Lorena Gonzalez Fletcher	Democratic	San Diego		

== See also ==
- List of California state legislatures
