= 2018 California Attorney General election =

- November 6, 2018
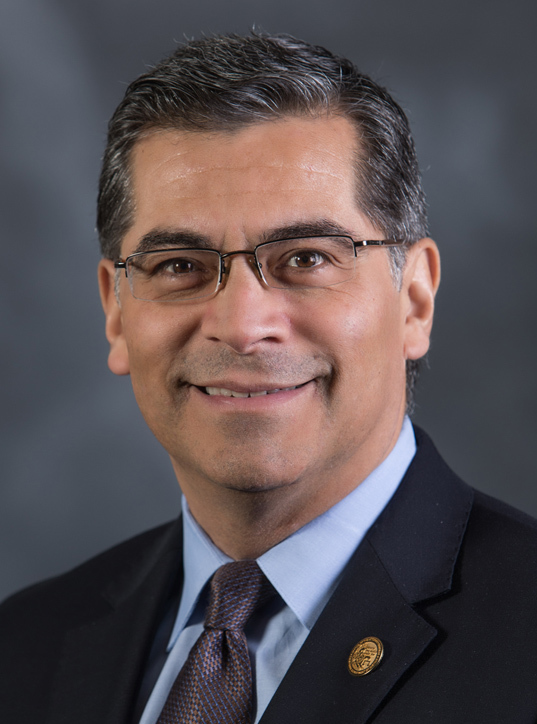

Candidate	Xavier Becerra	Steven Bailey
Party	Democratic	Republican
Popular vote	7,790,743	4,465,587
Percentage	63.57%	36.43%
- Becerra: 50–60% 60–70% 70–80% 80–90% >90% Bailey: 50–60% 60–70% 70–80%
Attorney General before election
Xavier Becerra
Democratic
Elected Attorney General
Xavier Becerra
Democratic

The 2018 California Attorney General election was held on November 6, 2018, to elect the attorney general of California. The 2014 election winner, Kamala Harris, was elected to the United States Senate during the 2016 Senate election; incumbent Democratic Attorney General, Xavier Becerra, won election to a full term.

== Primary ==
=== Democratic Party ===
==== Declared ====
- Xavier Becerra, incumbent attorney general of California and former U.S. representative
- Dave Jones, California Insurance Commissioner

=== Republican Party ===
==== Declared ====
- Steven Bailey, retired El Dorado County Superior Court judge
- Eric Early, managing partner of Early Sullivan Wright Gizer & McRae LLP

==== Withdrawn ====
- Michael A. Ramos, district attorney for San Bernardino County, California

=== Peace and Freedom Party ===
==== Declared ====
- Adriane Bracciale, criminal defense attorney in the Inland Empire

=== Endorsements ===
Steven Bailey

Cabinet-level officials

- Edwin Meese, 75th United States Attorney General

U.S. representatives

- Tom Campbell, former U.S. representative (R-CA)
- John Doolittle, former U.S. representative (R-CA)
- Ernie Konnyu, former U.S. representative (R-CA)
- Doug LaMalfa, U.S. representative (R-CA)
- Tom McClintock, U.S. representative (R-CA)

State-level officials

- Joel Anderson, California state senator (R-38)
- Frank Bigelow, California state assemblyman (R-5)
- Phillip Chen, California state assemblyman (R-55)
- Steven Choi, California state assemblyman (R-68)
- Beth Gaines, former California state assemblywoman (R-6)
- Ted Gaines, California state senator (R-1)
- James Gallagher, California state assemblyman (R-3)
- Diane Harkey, chair of the California State Board of Equalization
- Matthew Harper, California state assemblyman (R-74), 59th mayor of Huntington Beach
- Bob Huff, former California Senate Minority Leader
- Bill Jones, former California Secretary of State
- Melissa Melendez, California state assemblywoman (R-67), former mayor of Lake Elsinore
- John Moorlach, California state senator (R-37)
- Mike Morrell, California state senator (R-23)
- Jim Nielsen, California state senator (R-4)
- Jay Obernolte, California state assemblyman (R-33)
- Jim Patterson, California state assemblyman (R-23)
- Leslie Rutledge, attorney general of Arkansas
- M. David Stirling, former California chief deputy attorney general
- Randy Voepel, California state assemblyman (R-71)

Local-level officials

- John Allard, Roseville city councilman
- Michael D. Antonovich, former Los Angeles County supervisor
- Richard Bailey, mayor of Coronado
- Jim Beard, Sierra County supervisor
- Lee Brand, mayor of Fresno
- Gregg Cohen, Tehama County district attorney
- Keith Curry, former mayor of Newport Beach
- Tom Davis, South Lake Tahoe city councilman
- Rick DiBasilio, Calaveras County sheriff
- Dan Dow, San Luis Obispo County district attorney
- Fernando Dutra, Whittier city councilman
- Suzanne Fuentes, mayor of El Segundo
- Greg Hagwood, Plumas County sheriff
- Scott Jones, Sacramento County sheriff
- Ted Long, former South Lake Tahoe city councilman
- Margaret Mims, Fresno County sheriff
- Scott Owens, Placer County district attorney
- Harry T. Price, mayor of Fairfield
- Trent Saxton, former Placerville city councilman
- Richard Silverman, Manteca city councilman
- Michael Spence, vice mayor of West Covina
- Dwayne Stewart, Glenn County district attorney
- Jack Sweeney, former El Dorado County supervisor
- Chuck Timm, vice mayor of Fairfield
- John Valdivia, San Bernardino city councilman
- Joe Vinatieri, mayor of Whittier

Individuals

- John C. Eastman, constitutional scholar
- Ron Nehring, former California Republican Party chairman
- Michael Reagan, conservative commentator, adopted son of former governor of California and president of the United States Ronald Reagan

Organizations

- Association for Los Angeles Deputy Sheriffs
- Calaveras County GOP
- California Impact Republicans
- California Peace Officers' Association
- California Pro-Life Council
- California Republican Party
- California Republican Veterans Association
- Deputy Sheriffs' Association of El Dorado County
- El Dorado County GOP
- Fresno County GOP
- Glenn County GOP
- Gun Owners of California
- Humboldt County GOP
- Lincoln Club of Orange County
- Los Angeles Police Protective League
- Mariposa County GOP
- National Association of Police Organizations
- NRA Political Victory Fund
- Placer County GOP
- Rocklin Police Officers' Association
- Roseville Police Officers' Association
- Sacramento County GOP
- San Benito County GOP
- San Joaquin County GOP
- San Mateo County GOP
- Solano County GOP
Xavier Becerra

U.S. representatives

- Pete Aguilar, U.S. representative (D-CA-31)
- Ami Bera, U.S. representative (D-CA-7)
- Salud Carbajal, U.S. representative (D-CA-24)
- Tony Cárdenas, U.S. representative (D-CA-29)
- Judy Chu, U.S. representative (D-CA-27)
- Lou Correa, U.S. representative (D-CA-46)
- Jim Costa, U.S. representative (D-CA-16)
- Anna Eshoo, U.S. representative (D-CA-18)
- John Garamendi, U.S. representative (D-CA-3)
- Jimmy Gomez, U.S. representative (D-CA-34)
- Jared Huffman, U.S. representative (D-CA-2)
- Barbara Lee, U.S. representative (D-CA-13)
- Zoe Lofgren, U.S. representative (D-CA-19)
- Alan Lowenthal, U.S. representative (D-CA-47)
- Grace Napolitano, U.S. representative (D-CA-32)
- Jimmy Panetta, U.S. representative (D-CA-20)
- Nancy Pelosi, U.S. representative (D-CA-12) and House Minority Leader
- Scott Peters, U.S. representative (D-CA-52)
- Lucille Roybal-Allard, U.S. representative (D-CA-40)
- Raul Ruiz, U.S. representative (D-CA-36)
- Eric Swalwell, U.S. representative (D-CA-15)
- Mark Takano, U.S. representative (D-CA-41)
- Mike Thompson , U.S. representative (D-CA-5)
- Norma Torres, U.S. representative (D-CA-35)
- Juan Vargas, U.S. representative (D-CA-51)
- Maxine Waters, U.S. representative (D-CA-43)

State-level officials

- Jerry Brown, governor of California
- Alex Padilla, California secretary of state

State senators

- Toni Atkins (D-39)
- John Burton, former state senator
- Bill Dodd (D-3)
- Steve Glazer (D-7)
- Ed Hernandez (D-22), candidate for lieutenant governor of California in 2018
- Jerry Hill (D-13)
- Ben Hueso (D-40)
- Ricardo Lara (D-33)
- Connie Leyva (D-20)
- Holly Mitchell (D-30)
- Richard Pan (D-6)

State assembly members

- Joaquin Arambula (D-31)
- Rob Bonta (D-18)
- Anna Caballero (D-30)
- Ian Calderon (D-57)
- Wendy Carrillo (D-51)
- Anthony Rendon (D-63), Speaker of the Assembly

Local-level officials

- Eric Garcetti, mayor of Los Angeles
- Dennis Herrera, San Francisco city attorney
- Libby Schaaf, mayor of Oakland

Organizations

- California Teachers Association
Eric Early

Individuals

- Joel Anderson, California state senator (R-38)
- Patricia Bates, California Senate Minority Leader
- Phillip Chen, California state assemblyman (R-55)
- Steve Cooley, former Los Angeles County District Attorney
- Carl DeMaio, former member of the San Diego City Council
- David Hadley, former assemblyman
- Sandra Hutchens, Orange County sheriff
- Darrell Issa, U.S. representative (R-CA)
- John and Ken, talk radio hosts
- Don Knabe, former Los Angeles County Supervisor
- Stacey Montgomery, Lassen County District Attorney
- Robert Philibosian, former Los Angeles County District Attorney
- George P. Shultz, former U.S. Secretary of State
- Jeff Stone, California state senator (R-28)
- Scott Wilk, California state senator (R-21)
Dave Jones

U.S. representatives

- Karen Bass, U.S. representative (D-CA-37)
- Judy Chu, U.S. representative (D-CA-27)
- Ted Lieu, U.S. representative (D-CA-33)
- Alan Lowenthal, U.S. representative (D-CA-47)

State-level officials

- Luis Alejo, former California state assemblymember
- Jim Beall, California state senator (D-15)
- Patty Berg, former California state assemblymember
- Marty Block, former California state senator
- Richard Bloom, California state assemblymember (D-50)
- Cheryl Brown, former California state assemblymember
- Nora Campos, former California state assemblymember
- Ed Chau, California state assemblymember (D-49)
- John Chiang, treasurer of the State of California
- Kansen Chu, California state assemblymember (D-25)
- Ken Cooley, California state assemblymember (D-8)
- Matt Dababneh, California state assemblymember (D-45)
- Roger Dickinson, former California state assemblymember
- Paul Fong, former California state assemblymember
- Cathleen Galgiani, California state senator (D-5)
- Mike Gatto, former California state assemblymember
- Mike Gipson, California state assemblymember (D-64)
- Richard Gordon, former California state assemblymember
- Isadore Hall, former California state senator
- Jerry Hill, California state senator (D-13)
- Chris Holden, California state assemblymember (D-41)
- Reggie Jones-Sawyer, California state assemblymember (D-59)
- Ash Kalra, California state assemblymember (D-27)
- Betty Karnette, former California state senator
- Ricardo Lara, California state senator (D-33)
- Mark Leno, former California state senator
- Connie Leyva, California state senator (D-20)
- Patty Lopez, former California state assemblymember
- Kevin McCarty, California state assemblymember (D-7)
- Mike McGuire, California state senator (D-2)
- Jose Medina, California state assemblymember (D-61)
- Tony Mendoza, former California state senator
- Holly Mitchell, California state senator (D-30)
- Adrin Nazarian, California state assemblymember (D-46)
- Fran Pavley, former California state senator
- John Pérez, former Speaker of the California State Assembly
- Richard Roth, California state senator (D-31)
- Miguel Santiago, California state assemblymember (D-53)
- Nancy Skinner, California state senator (D-9)
- Tom Torlakson, California Superintendent of Public Instruction
- Bob Wieckowski, California state senator (D-10)
- Das Williams, former California state assemblymember
- Mariko Yamada, former California state assemblymember

Local-level officials

- Jay Chen, Hacienda La Puente Unified School District Board member and candidate for U.S. House in 2018
- Paul Koretz, member of the Los Angeles City Council
- Rishi Kumar, member of the Saratoga City Council
- Otto Lee, member of the Sunnyvale City Council
- Polly Low, mayor of Rosemead
- Stephanie Nguyen, member of the Elk Grove City Council
- Jim Prola, member of the San Leandro City Council
- David Ryu, member of the Los Angeles City Council
- Don Saylor, member of the Yolo County Board of Supervisors
- Darrell Steinberg, mayor of Sacramento
- Lamar Thorpe, vice mayor of Antioch
- Gilbert Wong, member of the Cupertino City Council
- Roz Wyman, former member of the Los Angeles City Council
- Steve Young, vice mayor of Benicia

California Democratic Party leaders

- Eric Bauman, chairman of the California Democratic Party

Organizations

- Black Young Democrats of Sacramento
- Cal Berkeley Democrats
- East Bay Young Democrats
- Organize Win Legislate Sacramento
- Our Revolution San Joaquin County
- Stonewall Young Democrats
- United Teachers Los Angeles
- Cal Berkeley Democrats
- Ventura County Young Democrats

Newspapers

- East Bay Times
- San Francisco Bay Guardian
- San Jose Mercury News

=== Polling ===
Poll source	Date(s) administered	Sample size	Xavier Becerra (D)	Steven Bailey (R)	Eric Early (R)	Dave Jones (D)	Undecided
Gravis Marketing	May 4–5, 2018	525	28%	21%	10%	10%	31%

=== Results ===
Results by county Becerra: 30–40%; 40–50%; 50–60%; 60–70%; Bailey: 30–40%; 40–50%

Nonpartisan blanket primary results
Party	Candidate	Votes	%
Democratic	Xavier Becerra (incumbent)	3,024,611	45.82%
Republican	Steven Bailey	1,615,859	24.48%
Democratic	Dave Jones	1,017,427	15.41%
Republican	Eric Early	943,071	14.29%
Total votes		6,600,968	100.00%

== General election ==
=== Predictions ===
Source	Ranking	As of
Governing	Safe D	October 26, 2018

=== Polling ===
Poll source	Date(s) administered	Sample size	Margin of error	Xavier Becerra (D)	Steven Bailey (R)	Undecided
Gravis Marketing	October 25–26, 2018	743	± 3.6%	52%	34%	14%

=== Results ===
Becerra won the election in a landslide, even outperforming Gavin Newsom during the simultaneous gubernatorial election.

2018 California Attorney General election
Party	Candidate	Votes	%	±%
Democratic	Xavier Becerra (incumbent)	7,790,743	63.57%	+6.08%
Republican	Steven Bailey	4,465,587	36.43%	−6.08%
Total votes		12,256,330	100.00%	N/A
Democratic hold				

==== By county ====
County	Xavier Becerra Democratic		Steven Bailey Republican		Margin		Total votes cast
County	#	%	#	%	#	%	Total votes cast
Alameda	456,654	81.29%	105,114	18.71%	351,540	62.58%	561,768
Alpine	399	65.20%	213	34.80%	186	30.39%	603
Amador	6,451	37.33%	10,828	62.67%	-4,377	-25.33%	17,279
Butte	42,656	48.94%	44,509	51.06%	-1,853	-2.13%	87,165
Calaveras	8,062	38.17%	13,058	61.83%	-4,996	-23.66%	21,120
Colusa	2,206	39.01%	3,449	60.99%	-1,243	-21.98%	5,655
Contra Costa	278,533	68.96%	125,397	31.04%	153,136	37.91%	403,930
Del Norte	3,523	42.65%	4,738	57.35%	-1,215	-14.71%	8,261
El Dorado	36,954	42.06%	50,908	57.94%	-13,954	-15.88%	87,862
Fresno	127,666	51.25%	121,439	48.75%	6,227	2.50%	249,105
Glenn	2,651	32.26%	5,566	67.74%	-2,915	-35.48%	8,217
Humboldt	34,336	65.99%	17,695	34.01%	16,641	31.98%	52,031
Imperial	21,935	66.25%	11,176	33.75%	10,759	32.49%	33,111
Inyo	3,321	46.18%	3,871	53.82%	-550	-7.65%	7,192
Kern	84,764	42.14%	116,403	57.86%	-31,639	-15.73%	201,167
Kings	12,626	42.17%	17,316	57.83%	-4,690	-15.66%	29,942
Lake	11,212	53.87%	9,603	46.13%	1,609	7.73%	20,815
Lassen	2,101	23.55%	6,821	76.45%	-4,720	-52.90%	8,922
Los Angeles	2,140,565	73.91%	755,785	26.09%	1,384,780	47.81%	2,896,350
Madera	15,608	40.99%	22,470	59.01%	-6,862	-18.02%	38,078
Marin	101,633	79.94%	25,501	20.06%	76,132	59.88%	127,134
Mariposa	3,228	39.48%	4,948	60.52%	-1,720	-21.04%	8,176
Mendocino	22,489	68.44%	10,370	31.56%	12,119	36.88%	32,859
Merced	31,627	54.15%	26,777	45.85%	4,850	8.30%	58,404
Modoc	885	25.89%	2,533	74.11%	-1,648	-48.22%	3,418
Mono	2,748	57.11%	2,064	42.89%	684	14.21%	4,812
Monterey	77,596	67.49%	37,374	32.51%	40,222	34.98%	114,970
Napa	36,605	66.07%	18,800	33.93%	17,805	32.14%	55,405
Nevada	29,078	54.54%	24,240	45.46%	4,838	9.07%	53,318
Orange	550,097	51.66%	514,686	48.34%	35,411	3.33%	1,064,783
Placer	73,856	42.75%	98,897	57.25%	-25,041	-14.50%	172,753
Plumas	3,534	38.97%	5,535	61.03%	-2,001	-22.06%	9,069
Riverside	327,651	51.57%	307,642	48.43%	20,009	3.15%	635,293
Sacramento	308,809	60.76%	199,420	39.24%	109,389	21.52%	508,229
San Benito	11,776	59.18%	8,122	40.82%	3,654	18.36%	19,898
San Bernardino	285,056	53.71%	245,656	46.29%	39,400	7.42%	530,712
San Diego	662,897	58.63%	467,738	41.37%	195,159	17.26%	1,130,635
San Francisco	305,501	86.65%	47,070	13.35%	258,431	73.30%	352,571
San Joaquin	104,052	54.30%	87,558	45.70%	16,494	8.61%	191,610
San Luis Obispo	65,946	53.37%	57,608	46.63%	8,338	6.75%	123,554
San Mateo	213,415	76.49%	65,600	23.51%	147,815	52.98%	279,015
Santa Barbara	95,004	62.49%	57,032	37.51%	37,972	24.98%	152,036
Santa Clara	435,623	72.23%	167,498	27.77%	268,125	44.46%	603,121
Santa Cruz	91,677	78.09%	25,723	21.91%	65,954	56.18%	117,400
Shasta	21,629	31.27%	47,545	68.73%	-25,916	-37.46%	69,174
Sierra	633	38.53%	1,010	61.47%	-377	-22.95%	1,643
Siskiyou	7,491	41.70%	10,472	58.30%	-2,981	-16.60%	17,963
Solano	91,048	63.15%	53,121	36.85%	37,927	26.31%	144,169
Sonoma	153,193	73.92%	54,046	26.08%	99,147	47.84%	207,239
Stanislaus	79,204	51.29%	75,219	48.71%	3,985	2.58%	154,423
Sutter	11,439	39.11%	17,811	60.89%	-6,372	-21.78%	29,250
Tehama	6,269	30.34%	14,391	69.66%	-8,122	-39.31%	20,660
Trinity	2,367	45.09%	2,882	54.91%	-515	-9.81%	5,249
Tulare	43,201	43.78%	55,486	56.22%	-12,285	-12.45%	98,687
Tuolumne	9,298	39.99%	13,952	60.01%	-4,654	-20.02%	23,250
Ventura	173,990	57.07%	130,887	42.93%	43,103	14.14%	304,877
Yolo	50,795	69.56%	22,226	30.44%	28,569	39.12%	73,021
Yuba	7,180	37.85%	11,788	62.15%	-4,608	-24.29%	18,968
Totals	7,790,743	63.57%	4,465,587	36.43%	3,325,156	27.13%	12,256,330

Counties that flipped from Republican to Democratic

- Fresno (largest city: Fresno)
- Merced (largest city: Merced)
- Mono (largest city: Mammoth Lakes)
- Orange (largest city: Anaheim)
- Riverside (largest city: Riverside)
- San Bernardino (largest city: San Bernardino)
- San Diego (largest city: San Diego)
- Stanislaus (largest city: Modesto)

==== By congressional district ====
Becerra won 46 of 53 congressional districts.

District	Becerra	Bailey	Representative
1st	41%	59%	Doug LaMalfa
2nd	73%	27%	Jared Huffman
3rd	55%	45%	John Garamendi
4th	42%	58%	Tom McClintock
5th	71%	29%	Mike Thompson
6th	72%	28%	Doris Matsui
7th	54%	46%	Ami Bera
8th	42%	58%	Paul Cook
9th	56%	44%	Jerry McNerney
10th	52%	48%	Josh Harder
11th	71%	29%	Mark DeSaulnier
12th	87%	13%	Nancy Pelosi
13th	91%	9%	Barbara Lee
14th	77%	23%	Jackie Speier
15th	70%	30%	Eric Swalwell
16th	59%	41%	Jim Costa
17th	72%	28%	Ro Khanna
18th	73%	27%	Anna Eshoo
19th	71%	29%	Zoe Lofgren
20th	72%	28%	Jimmy Panetta
21st	55%	45%	TJ Cox
22nd	44%	56%	Devin Nunes
23rd	38%	62%	Kevin McCarthy
24th	59%	41%	Salud Carbajal
25th	53%	47%	Katie Hill
26th	59%	41%	Julia Brownley
27th	67%	33%	Judy Chu
28th	77%	23%	Adam Schiff
29th	81%	19%	Tony Cárdenas
30th	72%	28%	Brad Sherman
31st	59%	41%	Pete Aguilar
32nd	68%	32%	Grace Napolitano
33rd	69%	31%	Ted Lieu
34th	87%	13%	Jimmy Gomez
35th	68%	32%	Norma Torres
36th	54%	46%	Raul Ruiz
37th	88%	12%	Karen Bass
38th	68%	32%	Linda Sánchez
39th	52%	48%	Gil Cisneros
40th	84%	16%	Lucille Roybal-Allard
41st	62%	38%	Mark Takano
42nd	43%	57%	Ken Calvert
43rd	80%	20%	Maxine Waters
44th	84%	16%	Nanette Barragán
45th	51%	49%	Katie Porter
46th	66%	34%	Lou Correa
47th	63%	37%	Alan Lowenthal
48th	51%	49%	Harley Rouda
49th	53%	47%	Mike Levin
50th	43%	57%	Duncan Hunter
51st	72%	28%	Juan Vargas
52nd	60%	40%	Scott Peters
53rd	67%	33%	Susan Davis
