= California State Legislature, 2019–2020 session =

Session of Californian legislature

2019–20 session of the California State Legislature
| ← | 2017–2018 | 2021–2022 | → |
- The Seal of California

Overview
- Legislative body: California State Legislature
- Jurisdiction: California
- Term: December 3, 2018 – November 30, 2020.

Senate
- Members: 40
- President of the Senate: Gavin Newsom (D) Dec. 3, 2018 – Jan. 7, 2019; Eleni Kounalakis (D) Jan. 7, 2019 - present
- President pro tempore: Toni Atkins (D–39th); Dec. 3, 2018 – present
- Minority Leader: Patricia Bates (R–36th) Dec. 3, 2018 – Mar. 1, 2019; Shannon Grove (R–16th) Mar. 1, 2019 – present
- Party control: Democratic

Assembly
- Members: 80
- Speaker: Anthony Rendon (D–63rd); Dec. 3, 2018 – present
- Minority Leader: Marie Waldron (R–75th); Dec. 3, 2018 – present
- Party control: Democratic

The 2019–20 session was a session of the California State Legislature. The session first convened on December 3, 2018 and adjourned sine die on November 30, 2020.

== Major events ==
=== Vacancies and special elections ===
- January 7, 2019: Republican senator Ted Gaines (1st–El Dorado Hills) resigns to take a seat on the California State Board of Equalization while Democratic Senator Ricardo Lara (33rd–Bell Gardens) resigns to become California Insurance Commissioner.
- June 12, 2019: Republican assemblymember Brian Dahle and Democratic Councilwoman Lena Gonzalez (Long Beach) is sworn into office after winning June 4 special elections for the 1st Senate district to replace Gaines (Dahle) and the 33rd Senate district to replace Lara (Gonzalez).
- November 12, 2019: Republican Megan Dahle is sworn into office after winning the special election for the 1st Assembly district to replace Brian Dahle.
- October 30, 2019: Republican senator Jeff Stone (28th–La Quinta) resigns to become the Western Regional Director of the United States Department of Labor. Republican Melissa Melendez won a special election on May 12, 2020 and succeeded Stone on May 18. She resigned from California's 67th State Assembly district.

=== Leadership changes ===
- January 7, 2019: Democrat Eleni Kounalakis, a former U.S. Ambassador to Hungary, is sworn in as Lieutenant Governor (and Senate President), replacing Gavin Newsom, who termed out but was elected Governor.
- March 1, 2019: Republican senator Shannon Grove (16th–Bakersfield) replaces senator Patricia Bates (36th–Laguna Niguel) as Senate minority leader

=== Party changes ===
- January 24, 2019: Assemblymember Brian Maienschein (77th–San Diego) changed party affiliation from Republican to Democratic.
- December 5, 2019: Assemblymember Chad Mayes (42nd–Yucca Valley) left the Republican Party to sit as an independent.

== State Senate ==
Composition of the California State Senate Democratic Party Republican Party

↓
| 29 | 11 |
| Democratic | Republican |

| Affiliation | Party (Shading indicates majority caucus) | | Total | |
| Affiliation | Democratic | Republican | Total | Vacant |
|---|---|---|---|---|
| End of previous legislature | 26 | 14 | 40 | 0 |
| Begin | 29 | 11 | 40 | 0 |
| January 7, 2019 | 28 | 10 | 38 | 2 |
| June 4, 2019 | 29 | 11 | 40 | 0 |
| November 1, 2019 | 29 | 10 | 39 | 1 |
| May 18, 2020 | 29 | 11 | 40 | 0 |
| Latest voting share | 74.4% | 25.6% | | |

=== Officers ===
| Position | Name | Party | District |
|---|---|---|---|
| Lieutenant Governor | Eleni Kounalakis | Democratic | |
| President pro tempore | Toni Atkins | Democratic | 39th–San Diego |
| Majority leader | Robert Hertzberg | Democratic | 18th–Van Nuys |
| Assistant majority leader | Mike McGuire | Democratic | 2nd–Healdsburg |
| Majority whip | Nancy Skinner | Democratic | 9th–Berkeley |
| Assistant majority whips | Maria Elena Durazo | Democratic | 24th–Los Angeles |
| Assistant majority whips | Scott Wiener | Democratic | 11th–San Francisco |
| Democratic caucus chair | Connie Leyva | Democratic | 20th–Chino |
| Minority leader | Shannon Grove | Republican | 16th–Bakersfield |
| Secretary | Erika Contreras | | |
| Sergeant-at-Arms | Jodie O. Barnett III | | |
| Chaplain | Sister Michelle Gorman, RSM | | |

The Secretary, the Sergeant-at-Arms, and the chaplain are not members of the Legislature.

=== Members ===
| District | Name | Party | Residence | Term-limited? | Notes |
|---|---|---|---|---|---|
| 1 | Ted Gaines | Republican | El Dorado Hills | | Resigned on January 7, 2019. |
| 1 | Brian Dahle | Republican | Bieber | | Sworn in on June 12, 2019. |
| 2 | Mike McGuire | Democratic | Healdsburg | | |
| 3 | Bill Dodd | Democratic | Napa | | |
| 4 | Jim Nielsen | Republican | Red Bluff | | |
| 5 | Cathleen Galgiani | Democratic | Stockton | Yes | |
| 6 | Richard Pan | Democratic | Sacramento | | |
| 7 | Steve Glazer | Democratic | Orinda | | |
| 8 | Andreas Borgeas | Republican | Fresno | | |
| 9 | Nancy Skinner | Democratic | Berkeley | | |
| 10 | Bob Wieckowski | Democratic | Fremont | | |
| 11 | Scott Wiener | Democratic | San Francisco | | |
| 12 | Anna Caballero | Democratic | Salinas | | |
| 13 | Jerry Hill | Democratic | San Mateo | Yes | |
| 14 | Melissa Hurtado | Democratic | Sanger | | |
| 15 | Jim Beall | Democratic | San Jose | Yes | |
| 16 | Shannon Grove | Republican | Bakersfield | | Minority leader since March 1, 2019 |
| 17 | Bill Monning | Democratic | Carmel | Yes | |
| 18 | Robert Hertzberg | Democratic | Van Nuys | | |
| 19 | Hannah-Beth Jackson | Democratic | Santa Barbara | Yes | |
| 20 | Connie Leyva | Democratic | Chino | | |
| 21 | Scott Wilk | Republican | Santa Clarita | | |
| 22 | Susan Rubio | Democratic | Baldwin Park | | |
| 23 | Mike Morrell | Republican | Rancho Cucamonga | Yes | |
| 24 | Maria Elena Durazo | Democratic | Los Angeles | | |
| 25 | Anthony Portantino | Democratic | La Cañada Flintridge | | |
| 26 | Ben Allen | Democratic | Santa Monica | | |
| 27 | Henry Stern | Democratic | Malibu | | |
| 28 | Jeff Stone | Republican | La Quinta | | Resigned on November 1, 2019 |
| 28 | Melissa Melendez | Republican | | | Sworn into office on May 18, 2020 |
| 29 | Ling Ling Chang | Republican | Diamond Bar | | |
| 30 | Holly Mitchell | Democratic | Los Angeles | | |
| 31 | Richard Roth | Democratic | Riverside | | |
| 32 | Bob Archuleta | Democratic | Pico Rivera | | |
| 33 | Ricardo Lara | Democratic | Bell Gardens | | Resigned on January 7, 2019 |
| 33 | Lena Gonzalez | Democratic | Long Beach | | Sworn into office on June 12, 2019 |
| 34 | Tom Umberg | Democratic | Santa Ana | | |
| 35 | Steven Bradford | Democratic | Gardena | | |
| 36 | Patricia Bates | Republican | Laguna Niguel | | Minority leader until March 1, 2019 |
| 37 | John Moorlach | Republican | Costa Mesa | | |
| 38 | Brian Jones | Republican | Santee | | |
| 39 | Toni Atkins | Democratic | San Diego | | President pro tempore |
| 40 | Ben Hueso | Democratic | San Diego | | |

== State Assembly ==
Composition of the California State Assembly Democratic Party Republican Party

↓
| 61 | 1 | 17 |
| Democratic | I | Republican |

| Affiliation | Party (Shading indicates majority caucus) | | | Total | |
| Affiliation | Democratic | Republican | Independent | Total | Vacant |
|---|---|---|---|---|---|
| End of previous legislature | 55 | 25 | 0 | 80 | 0 |
| Begin | 60 | 20 | 0 | 80 | 0 |
| January 24, 2019 | 61 | 19 | 0 | 80 | 0 |
| June 12, 2019 | 61 | 18 | 0 | 79 | 1 |
| November 12, 2019 | 61 | 19 | 0 | 80 | 0 |
| December 5, 2019 | 61 | 18 | 1 | 80 | 0 |
| May 18, 2020 | 61 | 17 | 1 | 80 | 1 |
| December 7, 2020 | 61 | 18 | 1 | 80 | 0 |
| Latest voting share | 76% | 23% | 1% | | |

=== Officers ===
| Position | Name | Party | District |
|---|---|---|---|
| Speaker | Anthony Rendon | Democratic | 63rd–Lakewood |
| Speaker pro tempore | Kevin Mullin | Democratic | 22nd–South San Francisco |
| Assistant speaker pro tempore | Rebecca Bauer-Kahan | Democratic | 16th–Orinda |
| Majority leader | Ian Calderon | Democratic | 57th–Whittier |
| Assistant majority leaders | Rob Bonta | Democratic | 18th–Alameda |
| Assistant majority leaders | Al Muratsuchi | Democratic | 66th–Rolling Hills Estates |
| Majority whip | Todd Gloria | Democratic | 78th–San Diego |
| Assistant majority whips | Tasha Boerner Horvath | Democratic | 76th–Encinitas |
| Assistant majority whips | Jesse Gabriel | Democratic | 45th–Encino |
| Democratic caucus chair | Mike Gipson | Democratic | 64th–Carson |
| Republican leader | Marie Waldron | Republican | 75th–Escondido |
| Republican floor leader | Heath Flora | Republican | 12th–Ripon |
| Republican caucus chair | Jay Obernolte | Republican | 33rd–Big Bear Lake |
| Republican chief whip | Phillip Chen | Republican | 55th–Yorba Linda |
| Republican whip | Devon Mathis | Republican | 26th–Visalia |
| Acting Chief Clerk | Sue Parker | | |
| Acting Chief Sergeant-at-Arms | Alisa Buckley | | |
| Chaplain | Reverend Patti Oshita | | |

The Chief Clerk, the acting Chief Sergeant-at-Arms, and the chaplain are not members of the Legislature.

=== Members ===
| District | Name | Party | Residence | Term-limited? | Notes |
|---|---|---|---|---|---|
| 1 | Brian Dahle | Republican | Bieber | | Resigned on June 12, 2019 |
| 1 | Megan Dahle | Republican | Bieber | | Sworn in on November 12, 2019 |
| 2 | Jim Wood | Democratic | Santa Rosa | | |
| 3 | James Gallagher | Republican | Yuba City | | |
| 4 | Cecilia Aguiar-Curry | Democratic | Winters | | |
| 5 | Frank Bigelow | Republican | O'Neals | | |
| 6 | Kevin Kiley | Republican | Rocklin | | |
| 7 | Kevin McCarty | Democratic | Sacramento | | |
| 8 | Ken Cooley | Democratic | Rancho Cordova | | |
| 9 | Jim Cooper | Democratic | Elk Grove | | |
| 10 | Marc Levine | Democratic | Greenbrae | | |
| 11 | Jim Frazier | Democratic | Discovery Bay | | |
| 12 | Heath Flora | Republican | Ripon | | |
| 13 | Susan Eggman | Democratic | Stockton | | |
| 14 | Tim Grayson | Democratic | Concord | | |
| 15 | Buffy Wicks | Democratic | Oakland | | |
| 16 | Rebecca Bauer-Kahan | Democratic | Orinda | | |
| 17 | David Chiu | Democratic | San Francisco | | |
| 18 | Rob Bonta | Democratic | Alameda | | |
| 19 | Phil Ting | Democratic | San Francisco | | |
| 20 | Bill Quirk | Democratic | Hayward | | |
| 21 | Adam Gray | Democratic | Merced | | |
| 22 | Kevin Mullin | Democratic | South San Francisco | | |
| 23 | Jim Patterson | Republican | Fresno | | |
| 24 | Marc Berman | Democratic | Palo Alto | | |
| 25 | Kansen Chu | Democratic | San Jose | | |
| 26 | Devon Mathis | Republican | Visalia | | |
| 27 | Ash Kalra | Democratic | San Jose | | |
| 28 | Evan Low | Democratic | Campbell | | |
| 29 | Mark Stone | Democratic | Scotts Valley | | |
| 30 | Robert Rivas | Democratic | Hollister | | |
| 31 | Joaquin Arambula | Democratic | Fresno | | |
| 32 | Rudy Salas | Democratic | Bakersfield | | |
| 33 | Jay Obernolte | Republican | Big Bear Lake | | |
| 34 | Vince Fong | Republican | Bakersfield | | |
| 35 | Jordan Cunningham | Republican | Paso Robles | | |
| 36 | Tom Lackey | Republican | Palmdale | | |
| 37 | Monique Limón | Democratic | Santa Barbara | | |
| 38 | Christy Smith | Democratic | Santa Clarita | | |
| 39 | Luz Rivas | Democratic | North Hollywood | | |
| 40 | James Ramos | Democratic | Highland | | |
| 41 | Chris Holden | Democratic | Pasadena | | |
| 42 | Chad Mayes | Republican | Yucca Valley | | Left the Republican Party on December 5, 2019 |
| 42 | Chad Mayes | Independent | Yucca Valley | | Left the Republican Party on December 5, 2019 |
| 43 | Laura Friedman | Democratic | Glendale | | |
| 44 | Jacqui Irwin | Democratic | Thousand Oaks | | |
| 45 | Jesse Gabriel | Democratic | Encino | | |
| 46 | Adrin Nazarian | Democratic | North Hollywood | | |
| 47 | Eloise Reyes | Democratic | Grand Terrace | | |
| 48 | Blanca Rubio | Democratic | Baldwin Park | | |
| 49 | Ed Chau | Democratic | Arcadia | | |
| 50 | Richard Bloom | Democratic | Santa Monica | | |
| 51 | Wendy Carrillo | Democratic | Boyle Heights | | |
| 52 | Freddie Rodriguez | Democratic | Pomona | | |
| 53 | Miguel Santiago | Democratic | Los Angeles | | |
| 54 | Sydney Kamlager | Democratic | Los Angeles | | |
| 55 | Phillip Chen | Republican | Yorba Linda | | |
| 56 | Eduardo Garcia | Democratic | Coachella | | |
| 57 | Ian Calderon | Democratic | Whittier | | |
| 58 | Cristina Garcia | Democratic | Bell Gardens | | |
| 59 | Reggie Jones-Sawyer | Democratic | Los Angeles | | |
| 60 | Sabrina Cervantes | Democratic | Riverside | | |
| 61 | Jose Medina | Democratic | Riverside | | |
| 62 | Autumn Burke | Democratic | Marina del Rey | | |
| 63 | Anthony Rendon | Democratic | Lakewood | | Speaker |
| 64 | Mike Gipson | Democratic | Carson | | |
| 65 | Sharon Quirk-Silva | Democratic | Fullerton | | |
| 66 | Al Muratsuchi | Democratic | Rolling Hills Estates | | |
| 67 | Melissa Melendez | Republican | Lake Elsinore | | Resigned on May 18, 2020 |
| 67 | Kelly Seyarto | Republican | Murrieta | | Sworn in on December 7, 2020 |
| 68 | Steven Choi | Republican | Irvine | | |
| 69 | Tom Daly | Democratic | Anaheim | | |
| 70 | Patrick O'Donnell | Democratic | Long Beach | | |
| 71 | Randy Voepel | Republican | Santee | | |
| 72 | Tyler Diep | Republican | Westminster | | |
| 73 | Bill Brough | Republican | Dana Point | | |
| 74 | Cottie Petrie-Norris | Democratic | Laguna Beach | | |
| 75 | Marie Waldron | Republican | Escondido | | Minority leader |
| 76 | Tasha Boerner Horvath | Democratic | Encinitas | | |
| 77 | Brian Maienschein | Republican | San Diego | | Changed parties on January 24, 2019 |
| 77 | Brian Maienschein | Democratic | San Diego | | Changed parties on January 24, 2019 |
| 78 | Todd Gloria | Democratic | San Diego | | |
| 79 | Shirley Weber | Democratic | San Diego | | Resigned on January 29, 2021 |
| 80 | Lorena Gonzalez | Democratic | San Diego | | |

== See also ==
- List of California state legislatures
