= Bonnie Lowenthal =

American politician (born 1940)

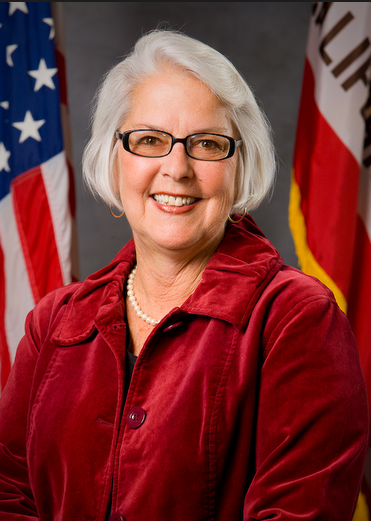

Member of the California State Assembly
- In office December 1, 2008 – November 30, 2014
- Preceded by: Betty Karnette
- Succeeded by: Patrick O'Donnell
- Constituency: 54th district (2008–2012); 70th district (2012–2014)

Member of the Long Beach City Council from the 1st District
- In office March 27, 2001 – December 1, 2008
- Preceded by: Jenny Oropeza
- Succeeded by: Robert Garcia

Personal details
- Born: Bonnie Barbara Adler; February 19, 1940 (age 86) New York City, New York
- Party: Democratic
- Spouse: Alan Lowenthal (m. 1966; div. 1989)
- Children: 2, including Josh
- Education: California State University, Long Beach; University of Wisconsin
- Occupation: Educator, therapist

Bonnie Lowenthal (born February 19, 1940) is an American politician who represented California's 70th State Assembly district. Lowenthal also served on the Long Beach City Council prior to her service in the Assembly. Lowenthal unsuccessfully ran for Mayor of Long Beach in 2014, failing to get past the primary nominating election, earning 19% of the vote.

== Early life and education ==
Lowenthal is the daughter of Jewish immigrants from the Soviet Union who immigrated to the United States to escape increasing anti-Semitism.

Lowenthal received her Bachelor of Science degree from the University of Wisconsin (class of 1961) and a Master's of Science in community and clinical psychology from Cal State Long Beach (class of 1974). Since 1975, Lowenthal has been a licensed family counselor and mental health consultant. She has also served as a bilingual mental health consultant for the League of United Latin American Citizens (LULAC), HeadStart, and the Centro de la Raza,

== Political career ==
Prior to her service in the Assembly, Lowenthal was elected to represent the First Council District of the City of Long Beach, in 2001, and was selected to serve as Vice Mayor in 2006. Lowenthal also served on the Long Beach Unified School District Board of Education for seven years and was a member of the Los Angeles County Metropolitan Transportation Authority (MTA), as well as many community boards and committees.

== Personal life ==
Lowenthal was previously married to California State Senator Alan Lowenthal—who was also one of her predecessors in her assembly seat. They were the first divorced couple to serve concurrently in the legislature. They have two sons: Daniel, a judge on a Superior Court, and Josh, a member of the California State Assembly.
