= A. D. Duffey =

American politician

Member of the California State Assembly from the 54th district
- In office January 5, 1903 – February 10, 1903
- Preceded by: Eli Wright
- Succeeded by: Harry S. Wanzer

Personal details
- Born: December 16, 1842 Bytown, Canada West
- Died: June 24, 1919 (aged 76) Mendocino, California, US
- Party: Democratic
- Spouse: Annie (m. 1879 her death 1918)
- Children: 3

Andrew Dallas Duffey (December 16, 1842 – June 24, 1919) served in the California State Assembly in the early 20th century for the 54th district.

Duffey was born in the Province of Canada, British North America. As of 1884, he was a member of the Odd Fellows in Santa Cruz.

It was initially unclear whether Duffey had won the 1902 election against his opponent Harry S. Wanzer. A committee of the legislature later determined that Wanzer had won the election. A report at the time stated that the vote was on "straight party" lines. Wanzer, although he was declared the winner and took his seat on February 10, 1903, resigned just a month later, on March 16, 1903.

Representing Assembly District 54, he was a member of the Democratic Party and won re-election in 1912.
