= Steven T. Kuykendall =

American politician (1947–2021)

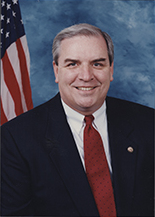

Member of the U.S. House of Representatives from California's 36th district
- In office January 3, 1999 – January 3, 2001
- Preceded by: Jane Harman
- Succeeded by: Jane Harman

Member of the California State Assembly from the 54th district
- In office December 5, 1994 – November 30, 1998
- Preceded by: Betty Karnette
- Succeeded by: Alan Lowenthal

Personal details
- Born: January 27, 1947 McAlester, Oklahoma, U.S.
- Died: January 22, 2021 (aged 73) Long Beach, California, U.S.
- Party: Republican
- Spouse: Jan Kuykendall
- Children: 3
- Education: Oklahoma City University (BS); San Diego State University (MBA)

Military service
- Branch/service: United States Marine Corps
- Years of service: 1968–1973
- Rank: Captain
- Battles/wars: Vietnam War

Steven T. Kuykendall (January 27, 1947 – January 22, 2021) was an American politician and Republican member of the U.S. House of Representatives from California's 36th congressional district from 1999 to 2001 in the 106th Congress. He defeated Democrat Janice Hahn in the 1998 election with 49% of the vote. He was narrowly defeated for re-election in 2000 by his predecessor Jane Harman, who had relinquished her seat to run for Governor in 1998. Kuykendall was the only freshman congressman to be defeated for re-election in 2000.

== Life and career ==
A resident of the Palos Verdes Peninsula, Kuykendall was born in McAlester, Oklahoma. He studied at Oklahoma City University and earned his MBA from San Diego State University. Kuykendall also served in the United States Marine Corps for two tours in the Vietnam War.

=== Political career ===
Prior to becoming a congressman in 1999, Kuykendall was a member of the California State Assembly between 1994 and 1998. He was elected to the Assembly by defeating incumbent Betty Karnette.

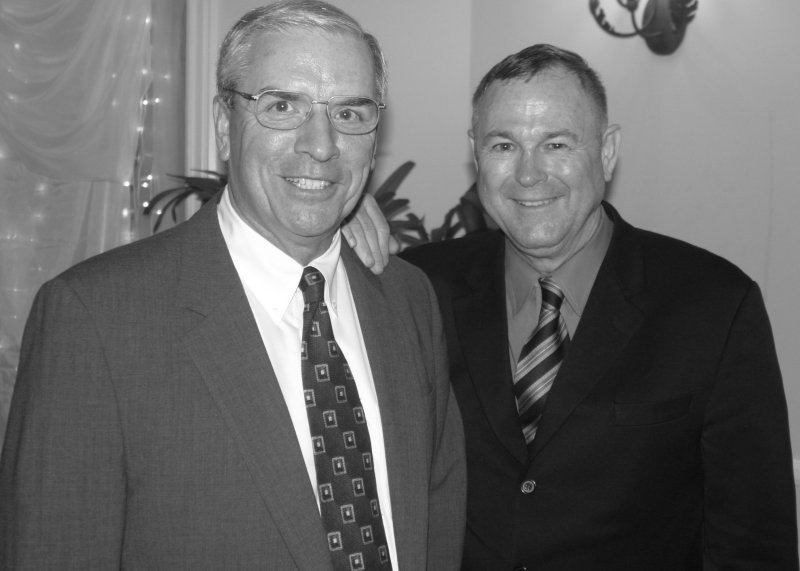
Kuykendall with Congressman Dana Rohrabacher

In 1998, he successfully waged a campaign for Congress and served in the 106th Congress from January 3, 1999, to January 3, 2001. He was an unsuccessful candidate for re-election in 2000. In the US House, Kuykendall served on the Armed Services, Science, and the Transportation and Infrastructure Committees.

Kuykendall ran again for the Assembly in 2004 but was unsuccessful. He also served on the Rancho Palos Verdes City Council from 1991 to 1994, holding the position of mayor in 1994. His political archives were donated to the California State University, Long Beach library.

In 2012, he ran for the newly created 47th congressional district. He placed third in the jungle primary and did not make the November runoff, which was won by Democrat Alan Lowenthal.

In January 2021, Kuykendall signed a letter calling on Republicans to impeach President Donald Trump after the 2021 storming of the United States Capitol.

=== Death ===
He died of pulmonary fibrosis on January 22, 2021, in Long Beach, California at age 73.

== Electoral history ==
California's 36th congressional district: Results 1998–2000
Year	Democrat	Votes	Pct	Republican	Votes	Pct	3rd Party	Party	Votes	Pct	3rd Party	Party	Votes	Pct	3rd Party	Party	Votes	Pct
1998	Janice Hahn	84,624	47%	Steven T. Kuykendall	88,843	49%	Robin Barrett	Green	3,612	2%	Kerry Welsh	Libertarian	3,066	2%	John R. Konopka	Reform	1,561	1%
2000	Jane Harman	115,651	48%	Steven T. Kuykendall	111,199	47%	Daniel R. Sherman	Libertarian	6,073	3%	John R. Konopka	Reform	3,549	1%	Matt Ornati	Natural Law	2,264	1%

California Assembly
Preceded by Betty Karnette	Member of the California State Assembly from the 54th district 1994 – 1998	Succeeded by Alan Lowenthal
U.S. House of Representatives
Preceded by Jane Harman	Member of the U.S. House of Representatives from California's 36th congressional district 1999 – 2001	Succeeded by Jane Harman
