= Willard H. Murray Jr. =

American politician (1931–2021)

Willard Murray

Member of the California State Assembly from the 52nd district
- In office December 7, 1992 - November 30, 1996
- Preceded by: Paul Horcher
- Succeeded by: Carl Washington

Member of the California State Assembly from the 54th district
- In office December 5, 1988 – November 30, 1992
- Preceded by: Paul E. Zeltner
- Succeeded by: Betty Karnette

Personal details
- Born: January 1, 1931 Los Angeles, California, U.S.
- Died: December 20, 2021 (aged 90)
- Party: Democratic
- Spouse: Barbara Farris (m. 1956)
- Children: Kevin and Melinda

Military service
- Allegiance: United States
- Branch/service: United States Air Force
- Years of service: 1951–1958
- Battles/wars: Korean War

Willard H. Murray Jr. (January 1, 1931 – December 20, 2021) was an American politician who served as a member of the California State Assembly from 1988 until 1996. Murray made an unsuccessful run for congress in a special election in 1996 when he lost to Juanita McDonald. After that loss, he left the Assembly due to term limits.

== Start in politics ==
After working as an engineer throughout the 1950s, he became involved politically with the onset of the Civil Rights Movement in the 1960s. He served on the staffs of Los Angeles City Councilmen Robert Farrell and Billy Mills. On a state level, he served on the staffs of Lieutenant Governor Mervyn Dymally and as an advisor to the Senate Democratic Caucus. As a politician Murray focused on education, crime control, economic development, family values, homeless veterans, and pediatric and prenatal care for the poor.

== Other accomplishments ==
Murray established the first Institute on the Preservation of Jazz as an Artform at California State University, Long Beach, and established the Center for African-American Educational Excellence and Achievement at California State University, Dominguez Hills. Murray coauthored legislation which provides for Superintendents of Education in both the CDC and the California Youth Authority to have literacy programs for inmates to preempt recidivism. In 1997, the government of California rewarded Murray with a section of the State Route 91 named after him.

== Personal life and death ==
He was married to Barbara Murray. They had two children, Kevin, a former state senator from California's 26th Senate District and Melinda, a Deputy District Attorney for Los Angeles County. He died on December 20, 2021, at the age of 90.
