= Paul E. Zeltner =

American politician (1925–2018)

Paul Zeltner

Member of the California State Assembly from the 54th district
- In office December 1, 1986 - November 30, 1988
- Preceded by: Frank Vicencia
- Succeeded by: Willard H. Murray Jr.

Personal details
- Born: Paul Eugene Zeltner; October 11, 1925 Philadelphia, Pennsylvania
- Died: May 26, 2018 (aged 92) Rancho Bernardo, California
- Party: Republican
- Spouse: Patricia Higgins (m. 1956)
- Children: 3

Military service
- Branch/service: United States Navy
- Battles/wars: World War II

Paul Eugene Zeltner (October 11, 1925 – May 26, 2018) was an American politician who served in the California State Assembly for District 54 and during World War II era, he served in the United States Navy.

Zelter was discharged from the navy as a gunner's mate 2nd class. He then served as Deputy Sheriff for the Los Angeles County Sheriff for 26 years. He served on the Lakewood City Council before his surprise election to the solidly Democratic voting 54th. California state Assembly district in 1986 In 1988, he sought a second term and was narrowly defeated for reelection by Willard Murray. He died on May 26, 2018, at the age of 92.
