= Mark Gonzalez (politician) =

American politician

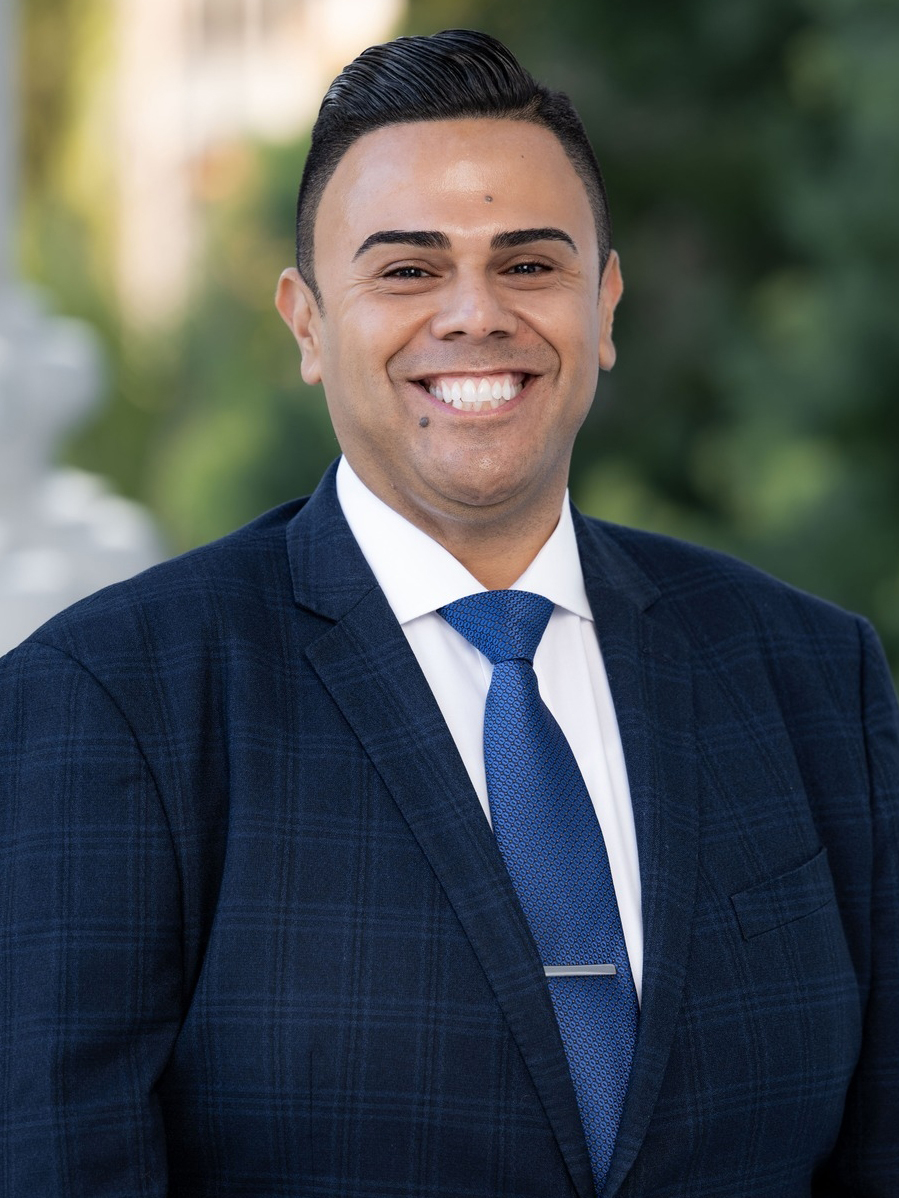
- Official portrait, 2024

Member of the California State Assembly from the 54th district
- Incumbent
- Assumed office December 2, 2024
- Preceded by: Miguel Santiago

Personal details
- Party: Democratic

Mark J. Gonzalez is an American politician who is currently a member of the California State Assembly since 2024. Prior to his election to the State Assembly, he was the chair of the Los Angeles County Democratic Party and was a Presidential elector.

== Political career ==
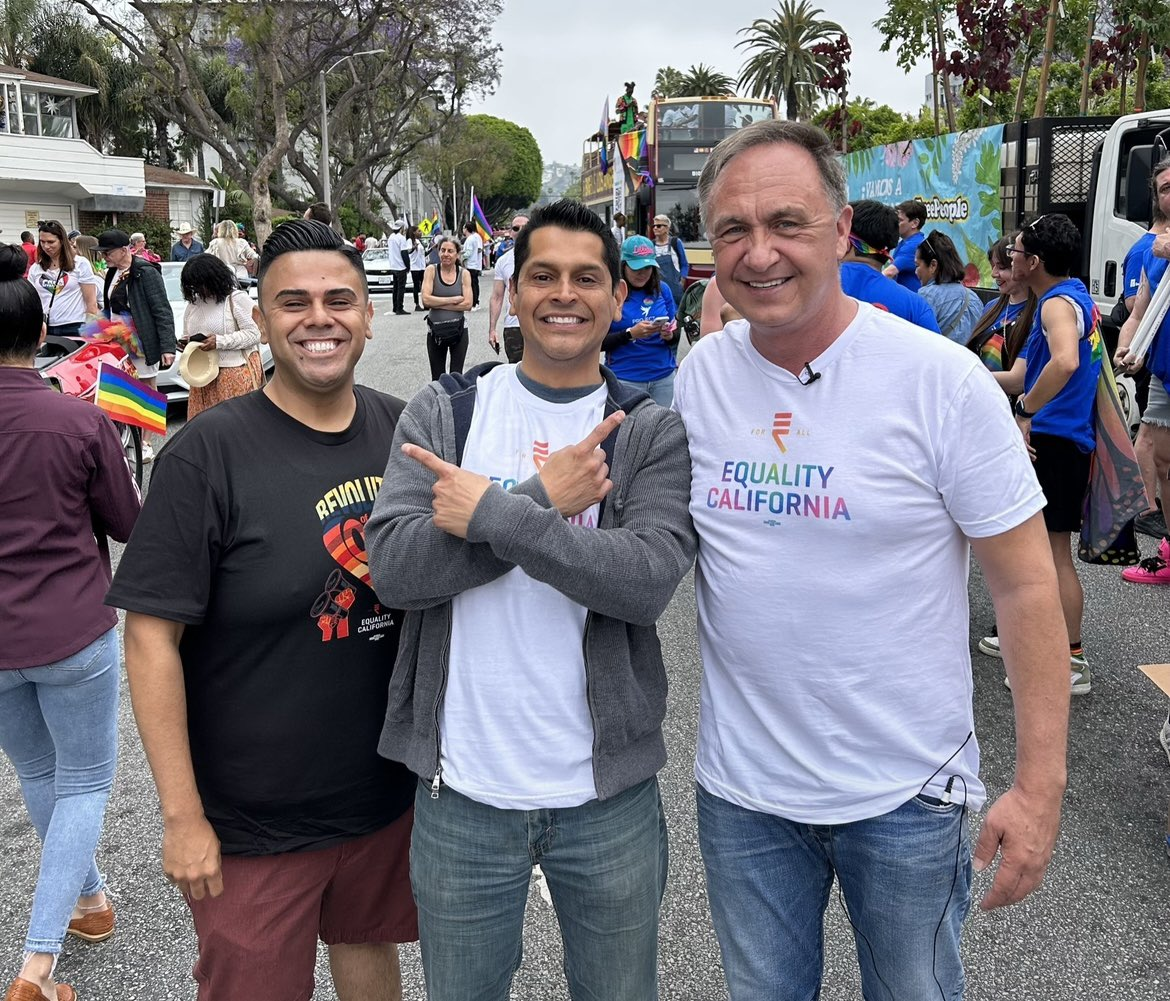
Gonzalez (left) with Assemblymembers Miguel Santiago and Rick Zbur in 2024.

In September 2020, Gonzales was chosen by Joe Biden to be a state director for his presidential campaign after previously working on Tom Steyer's campaign. In January 2021, he was chosen as one of California's 55 electors after he was appointed by U.S. Representative Jimmy Gomez.

In 2024, Gonzalez announced that he would be running to succeed Miguel Santiago in the California State Assembly election. In March 2024, he stepped down as chair of the LA County Democratic Party during his run for State Assembly. In the primary election placed first ahead of Democrat John Yi.

== Personal life ==
Gonzalez is openly gay.

== Electoral history ==
2024 California State Assembly 54th district election
Primary election
Party	Candidate	Votes	%
Democratic	Mark Gonzalez	19,616	45.2
Democratic	John Yi	14,963	34.5
Republican	Elaine Alaniz	8,819	20.3
Total votes		43,398	100.0
General election
Democratic	Mark Gonzalez	59,549	56.3
Democratic	John Yi	46,309	43.7
Total votes		105,858	100.0
Democratic hold			
