= Josh Lowenthal =

American politician (born 1970)

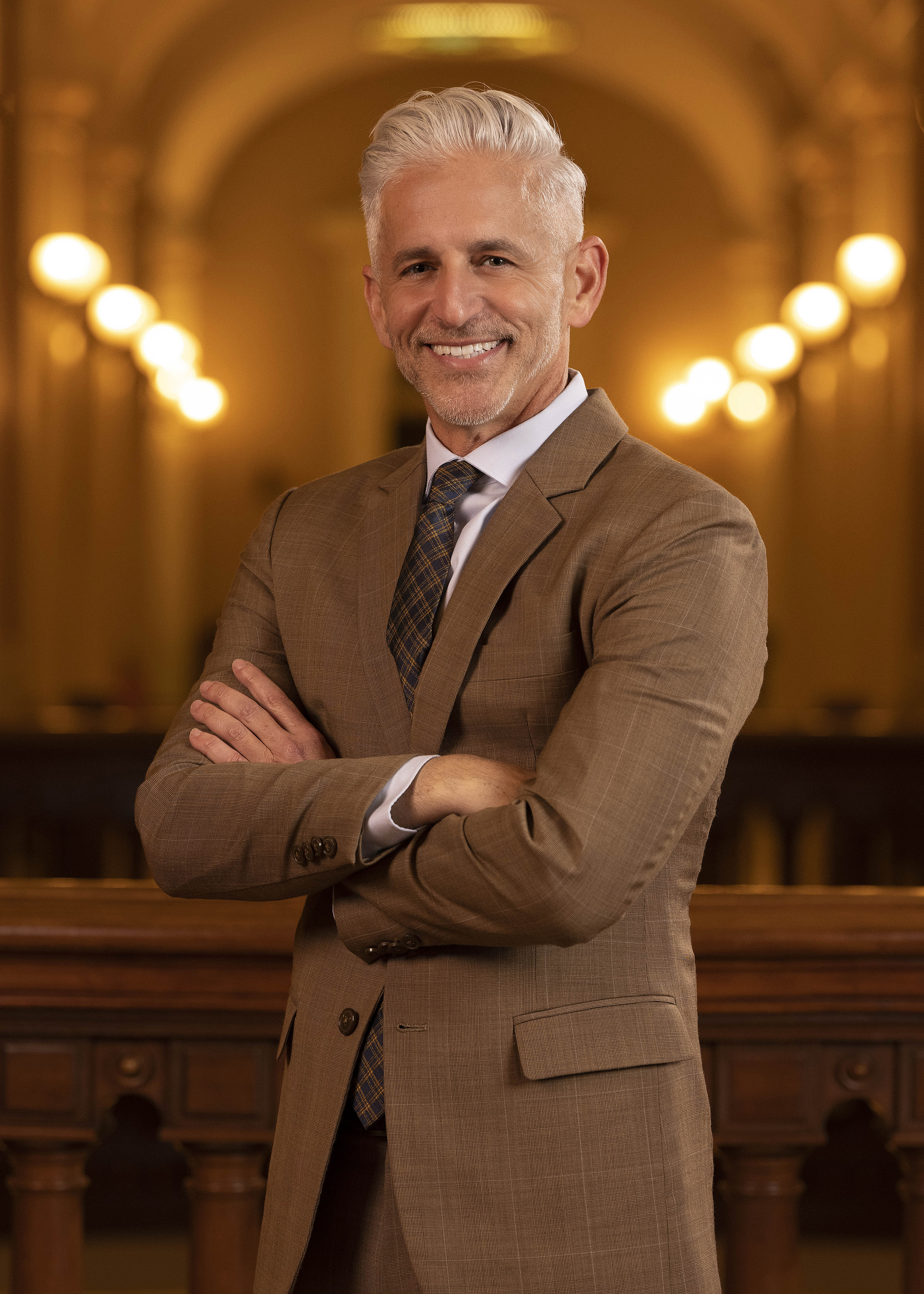
- Official portrait, 2022

Speaker pro tempore of the California State Assembly
- Incumbent
- Assumed office December 2, 2024
- Preceded by: Jim Wood

Member of the California State Assembly from the 69th district
- Incumbent
- Assumed office December 5, 2022
- Preceded by: Tom Daly

Personal details
- Born: Joshua Alder Lowenthal; February 15, 1970 (age 56) Long Beach, California, U.S.
- Party: Democratic
- Spouse: Erika Lowenthal
- Children: 3
- Relatives: Alan Lowenthal (father); Bonnie Lowenthal (mother)
- Education: Cornell University (BA); University of California, San Diego (MA)

Joshua Alder Lowenthal (born February 15, 1970) is an American business executive and politician from California serving as a member of the California State Assembly, representing the 69th district, based in Long Beach and Signal Hill. The son of politicians Bonnie and Alan Lowenthal, he was first elected in 2022 after a failed run for the State Assembly in 2018.

== Early life and education ==
Lowenthal was born on February 15, 1970, in Long Beach, California, to Alan Lowenthal and Bonnie Lowenthal, and is Jewish. He attended Cornell University, where he became the student body president, and later attended the University of California, San Diego. Before becoming a politician like his parents, he worked as a teacher and as a businessman who owned restaurants and a conference calling company. Prior to running for State Assembly, Lowenthal did community work, considering a run for a school board.

== Political career ==
In 2018, Lowenthal ran for the California State Assembly as the sole Democratic candidate for the 72nd district. The seat became open when the incumbent Assemblymember, Travis Allen opted to run for governor in lieu of reelection. Lowenthal faced Republican Tyler Diep in the general election. Diep was accused of using anti-Semitic imagery against Lowenthal during the campaign. Diep's campaign denied allegations of manipulating images to depict Lowenthal as stereotypically Jewish, but Diep later apologized about the mailers. Lowenthal lost to Diep by 8 points.

He ran for State Assembly again in 2022 in the newly-redrawn 69th district after incumbent Patrick O'Donnell announced his retirement. Lowenthal placed first and faced off against Long Beach councilman Al Austin, and defeated Austin in the general election.

== Summary of Key Legislation ==
In 2026, Lowenthal introduced a proposed law, AB 1709, that limited addictive features on social media for kids under the age of 16, stating that the social-media platforms need to do better to limit usage for younger minds.

== Electoral history ==
2018 California State Assembly 72nd district election
Primary election
Party	Candidate	Votes	%
Democratic	Josh Lowenthal	34,462	36.8
Republican	Tyler Diep	27,825	29.7
Republican	Greg Haskin	19,199	20.5
Republican	Long Pham	7,692	8.2
Republican	Richard Laird	4,555	5.0
Total votes		93,733	100.0
General election
Republican	Tyler Diep	83,221	51.6
Democratic	Josh Lowenthal	78,080	48.4
Total votes		161,301	100.0
Republican hold			

2022 California State Assembly 69th district election
Primary election
Party	Candidate	Votes	%
Democratic	Josh Lowenthal	30,919	45.6
Democratic	Al Austin II	17,985	26.5
Democratic	Janet Denise Foster	12,790	18.9
Democratic	Merry Taheri	6,052	8.9
Total votes		67,746	100.0
General election
Democratic	Josh Lowenthal	62,582	58.9
Democratic	Al Austin II	43,686	41.1
Total votes		106,268	100.0
Democratic hold			

2024 California State Assembly 69th district election
Primary election
Party	Candidate	Votes	%
Democratic	Josh Lowenthal (incumbent)	54,782	68.0
Republican	Joshua Rodriguez	25,755	32.0
Total votes		80,537	100.0
General election
Democratic	Josh Lowenthal (incumbent)	120,340	68.4
Republican	Joshua Rodriguez	55,595	31.6
Total votes		175,935	100.0
Democratic hold			

California Assembly
Preceded by Jim Wood	Speaker pro tempore of the California Assembly; 2024–present	Incumbent
