= Betty Karnette =

American politician (1931–2021)

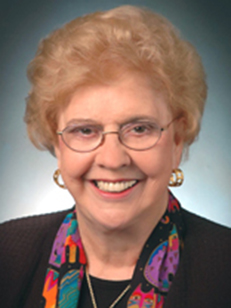

Member of the California State Assembly from the 54th district
- In office December 6, 2004 – November 30, 2008
- Preceded by: Alan Lowenthal
- Succeeded by: Bonnie Lowenthal

Member of the California State Senate from the 27th district
- In office December 2, 1996 – November 30, 2004
- Preceded by: Robert G. Beverly
- Succeeded by: Alan Lowenthal

Member of the California State Assembly from the 54th district
- In office December 7, 1992 – November 30, 1994
- Preceded by: Willard H. Murray, Jr.
- Succeeded by: Steven T. Kuykendall

Personal details
- Born: Betty Petty; September 13, 1931 Paducah, Kentucky
- Died: September 8, 2021 (aged 89) Long Beach, California
- Party: Democratic
- Spouse: Richard Stanley Karnette (d. 2016)
- Children: Mary Karnette
- Education: California State University, Long Beach
- Occupation: Teacher

Betty Karnette (née Petty; September 13, 1931 – September 8, 2021) was an American politician who served in the California State Assembly from 1992 to 1994 and from 2004 to 2008 and in the California State Senate from 1996 to 2004. She was elected to a second stint in the California State Assembly in November 2004 to represent the 54th district. Her district included the cities of Avalon, Long Beach, Palos Verdes Estates, Rancho Palos Verdes, Rolling Hills, Rolling Hills Estates, San Pedro, and Signal Hill. Her district contained parts of the Port of Long Beach and the Port of Los Angeles.

== Biography ==
Karnette served one previous term in the State Assembly from 1992 until she was defeated by Steven T. Kuykendall in 1994. She also served in the California State Senate from 1996 until she was termed out in 2004. Her committee assignments included the Rules; Appropriations; Transportation; Insurance; and the Arts, Entertainment, Sports, Tourism and Internet Media Committees. She chaired the Assembly Select Committee on Ports.

Betty Karnette died on September 8, 2021, in Long Beach, California, five days shy of her 90th birthday.

== Legislative accomplishments ==
- Authoring legislation requiring that voters be able to review the political contributions received by candidates for public office (SB 49).
- Authoring legislation allowing the use of "battered woman syndrome" to be used in defense of those convicted of killing abusive spouses (SB 799).
- Creating the Aquatic Invasive Species council within the Department of Fish and Game (SB 1573).
- Directing and assisting in development of a statewide study to improve transportation conditions linked with gateways for global trade.
