= Alan Lowenthal =

American politician (born 1941)

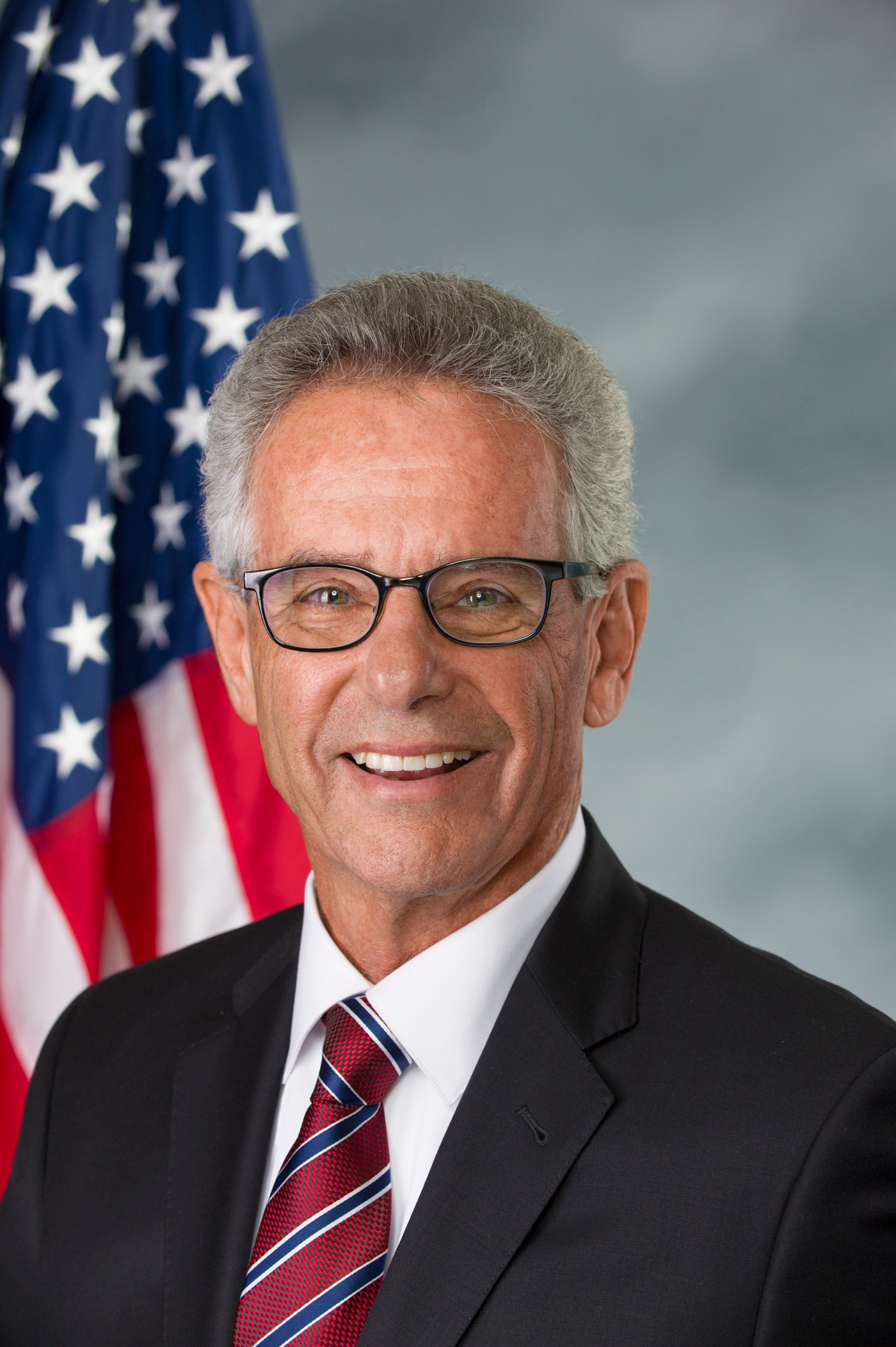
- Official portrait, 2013

Member of the U.S. House of Representatives from California's 47th district
- In office January 3, 2013 – January 3, 2023
- Preceded by: Loretta Sanchez
- Succeeded by: Robert Garcia (redistricted)

Member of the California State Senate from the 27th district
- In office December 6, 2004 – November 30, 2012
- Preceded by: Betty Karnette
- Succeeded by: Fran Pavley

Member of the California State Assembly from the 54th district
- In office December 7, 1998 – December 6, 2004
- Preceded by: Steven T. Kuykendall
- Succeeded by: Betty Karnette

Personal details
- Born: Alan Stuart Lowenthal; March 8, 1941 (age 85) New York City, New York, U.S.
- Party: Democratic
- Spouse(s): Bonnie Lowenthal (m. 1966; div. 1989) Deborah Malumed
- Children: 2, including Josh
- Education: Hobart College (BA); Ohio State University (MA, PhD)

Alan Stuart Lowenthal (/ˈloʊənˌθɔːl/; born March 8, 1941) is an American politician who served as the U.S. representative for California's 47th congressional district from 2013 to 2023. A member of the Democratic Party, he served as the California state assemblyman for the 54th district from 1998 to 2004 and California state senator from the 27th district from 2004 to 2012. In both posts, Lowenthal represented the city of Long Beach and its surrounding suburbs. On December 16, 2021, Lowenthal announced that he would not seek reelection to Congress.

== Early life, education, and academic career ==
Lowenthal was born and raised in Queens, New York City. His family is Jewish. He was graduated with a B.A. from Hobart College and earned a Ph.D. from Ohio State University. In 1969, Lowenthal moved to Long Beach and became a professor of community psychology at California State University, Long Beach. He went on leave to become a Long Beach City Councilman in 1992. He remained on leave for several years until retiring in 1998.

== California Assembly ==
=== Elections ===
In 1998, Lowenthal decided to run for the 54th district of the California State Assembly. He defeated Republican nominee Julie Alban 50%-47%. In 2000, he was reelected, defeating Republican nominee Rudy Svorinich, a Los Angeles City Council member, 59%-39%. In 2002, he was reelected to a third term, defeating Republican nominee Cesar Castellanos, 60%-40%.

=== Tenure ===
In the Assembly, Lowenthal authored gun control legislation that would ban gun selling in people's homes. He was also a founding member of the Assembly's Bipartisan Caucus and authored legislation for the creation of California's first ever Bipartisan Citizens Redistricting Commission.

In 2002, the California Firefighters Association named Lowenthal Legislator of the Year by after he passed a law that limited liability for organizations that donated firefighting equipment. The League of California Cities named him Legislator of the Year in 2001 due to his advocacy on behalf of local governments. He has also received the "Rivie" Award from the Friends of the Los Angeles River due to his efforts to help clean up the river.

== California Senate ==
=== Elections ===
In 2004, Lowenthal ran for the California Senate in the 27th Senate district. He won the Democratic primary unopposed. In the general election, he defeated Republican nominee Cesar Navarro Castellanos 63%-37%. In 2008, he was reelected, defeating Allen Wood 67%-33%.

=== Tenure ===
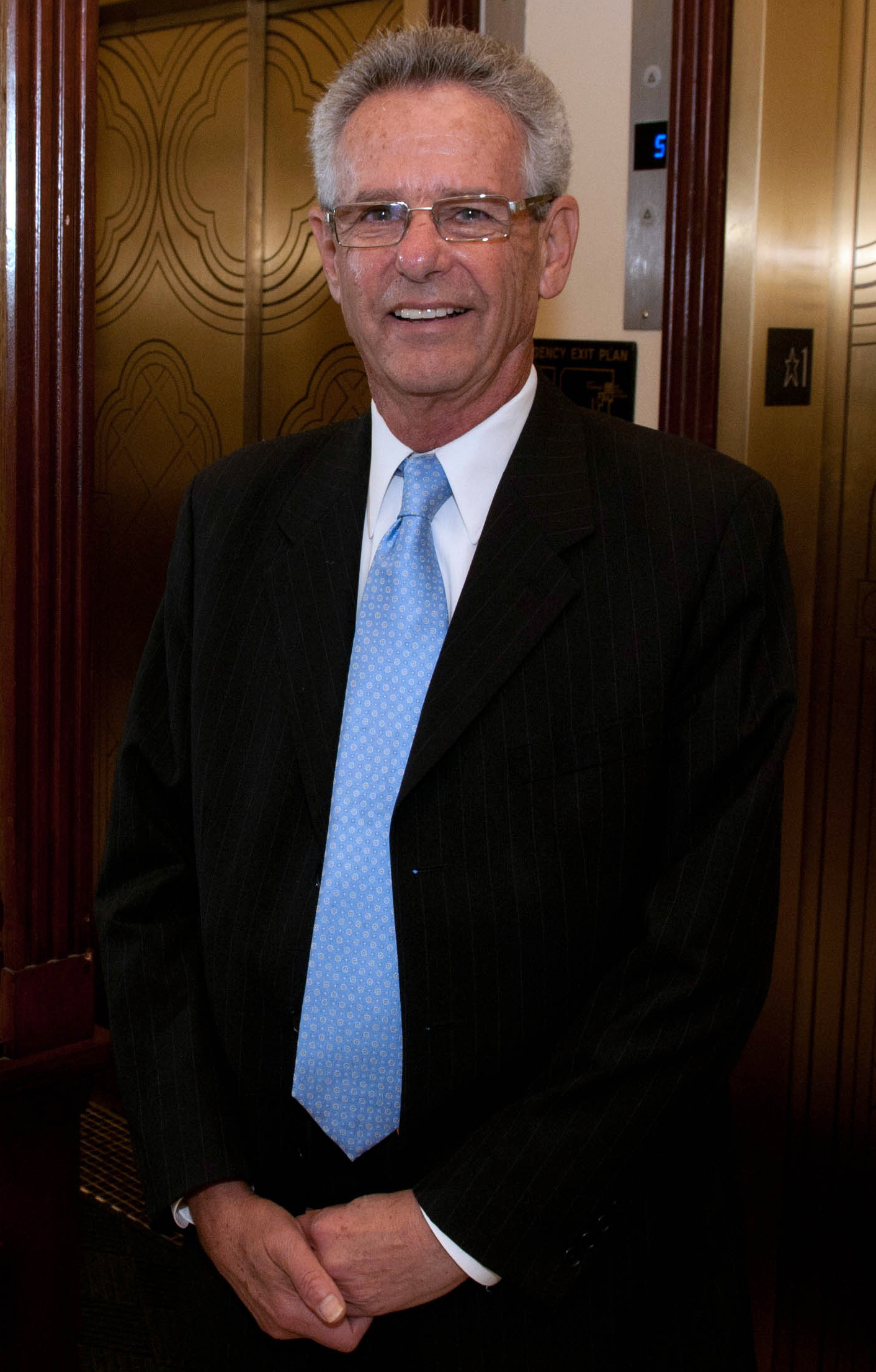
State Senator Lowenthal in 2010

The 47th district includes the Los Angeles County communities of Avalon, Long Beach, Signal Hill, Lakewood, Cerritos, Artesia, Bellflower, Downey, South Gate, Lynwood, Paramount, Hawaiian Gardens, Florence-Graham and Willowbrook. It also extends to the western Orange County cities of Garden Grove, Westminster, Stanton, Buena Park, Los Alamitos, and Cypress, and includes Catalina Island.

Legislation that Lowenthal had signed into law include a law to reduce diesel emissions at the ports by limiting idling time for trucks conducting transactions at the ports, a bill that established a grant program to provide financial incentives for purchasing or leasing electric vehicles, and a bill to protect highways.

With Bonnie Lowenthal's election to the Assembly and Alan Lowenthal's reelection in 2008, Senator and Assemblywoman Lowenthal were the first divorced husband and wife to serve concurrently in the California State Legislature.

Lowenthal provided significant commentary throughout the documentary Who Killed the Electric Car?.

=== Committee assignments ===
- Senate Committee Education (chair)
- Select Committee on California Ports and Goods Movement
- Select Committee on High-Speed Rail (chair)
- Senate Environmental Quality Committee

== U.S. House of Representatives ==
=== Elections ===
==== 2012 ====
On November 6, 2012, Lowenthal was elected to the U.S. House of Representatives from the newly created 47th district after defeating Republican Gary DeLong. DeLong carried the Orange County portion of the district with 54% of the vote, but Lowenthal swamped him in the Los Angeles County portion by over 38,000 votes, more than the overall margin of 30,100. He took office on January 3, 2013. Lowenthal is the first non-Hispanic Democrat to represent a significant portion of traditionally heavily Republican Orange County in Congress since Jerry M. Patterson, who served from 1975 to 1985. He was reelected in 2014, 2016 and 2018 by similar margins.

Until the Democrats swept every seat in Orange County at the 2018 elections, Lowenthal was the only elected white Democrat above the county level in much of the Orange County portion of the district. But the Los Angeles County portion has more than double the population of the Orange County portion; the district's share of Long Beach alone accounts for over half of its population.

Lowenthal is a member of the Congressional Progressive Caucus.

=== Tenure ===
Lowenthal is a strong supporter of Israel. He said that the "historical denial about the right of Jewish people to have their own homeland" and the Palestinian "refusal to acknowledge Israel as a Jewish state, that is a critical issue that needs to be addressed."

Lowenthal has been critical of Brazil's president Jair Bolsonaro. In March 2019 he and 29 other Democratic lawmakers wrote Secretary of State Mike Pompeo a letter that read in part, "Since the election of far-right candidate Jair Bolsonaro as president, we have been particularly alarmed by the threat Bolsonaro’s agenda poses to the LGBTQ+ community and other minority communities, women, labor activists, and political dissidents in Brazil."

=== Committee assignments ===
- United States House Committee on Transportation and Infrastructure
  - Subcommittee on Highways and Transit
  - Subcommittee on Water Resources and Environment
  - Subcommittee on Coast Guard and Maritime Transportation
- Committee on Natural Resources
  - Subcommittee on Energy and Mineral Resources
  - Subcommittee on Fisheries, Wildlife, Oceans and Insular Affairs
  - Subcommittee on Water and Power

=== Caucus memberships ===
- Congressional Asian Pacific American Caucus
- House Baltic Caucus
- Congressional Arts Caucus
- United States Congressional International Conservation Caucus
- Climate Solutions Caucus
- Congressional Progressive Caucus.
- Medicare for All Caucus
- Blue Collar Caucus
- House Pro-Choice Caucus

=== Retirement ===
On December 16, 2021, Lowenthal announced that he would retire from the U.S. House at the end of his term on January 3, 2023.

== Political positions ==
As of 2020, Lowenthal has a 100% rating from NARAL Pro-Choice America and an F rating from the Susan B. Anthony List for his abortion-related voting record. He opposed the overturning of Roe v. Wade, calling it "devastating to every American woman who has, with the stroke of a pen, had their rights curtailed and their status as free and equal citizens abridged." Noted for his work on environmental issues, among other things he has supported banning the use of hydrofluoric acid (HF) at oil refineries.

== Personal life ==
Lowenthal was married to Bonnie Adler from 1966 to 1989. The marriage produced two sons: Daniel, who has been a judge on the Los Angeles County Superior Court since 2006, and Josh, who has been serving in the California State Assembly since 2022.

Lowenthal's second wife is Deborah Malumed, a physician.

== See also ==
- List of Jewish members of the United States Congress

U.S. House of Representatives
Preceded by Loretta Sanchez	Member of the U.S. House of Representatives from California's 47th congressional district 2013–2023	Succeeded by Katie Porter
U.S. order of precedence (ceremonial)
Preceded by Karen Bass as Former U.S. Representative	Order of precedence of the United States as Former U.S. Representative	Succeeded by Gerry Sikorski as Former U.S. Representative
