= Sebastian Ridley-Thomas =

American politician

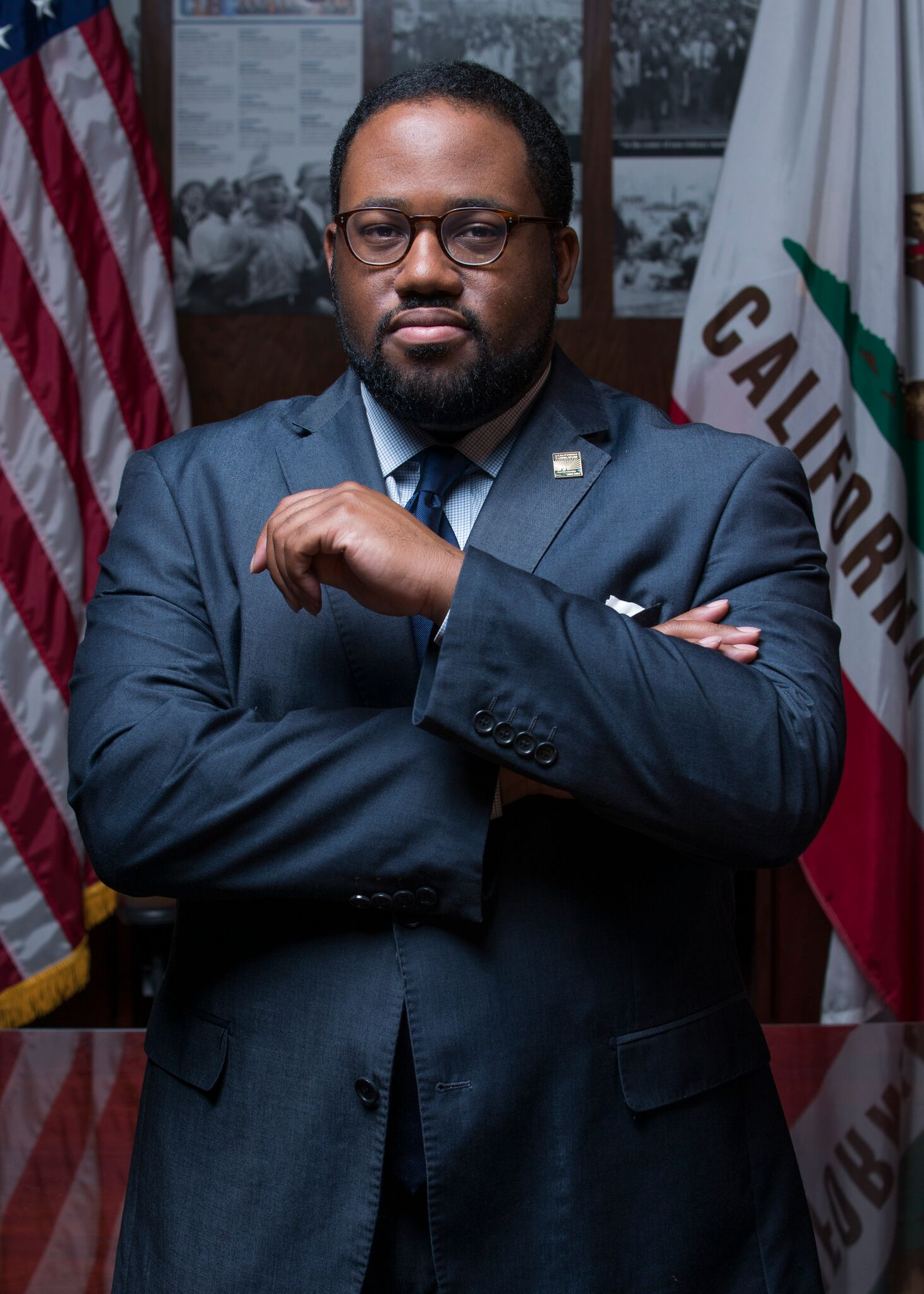
- Official portrait, 2016

Member of the California State Assembly from the 54th district
- In office December 5, 2013 – December 31, 2017
- Preceded by: Holly Mitchell
- Succeeded by: Sydney Kamlager

Personal details
- Born: August 12, 1987 (age 39) Los Angeles, California, U.S.
- Party: Democratic
- Education: Morehouse College

Sebastian Ridley-Thomas (born August 12, 1987) is an American politician who served in the California State Assembly. As a Democrat, he represented the 54th Assembly District, which includes the Los Angeles County communities of Century City, Culver City, Westwood, Mar Vista, Palms, Baldwin Hills, Windsor Hills, Ladera Heights, View Park, Crenshaw, Leimert Park, Mid City, and West Los Angeles.

He was elected to office on December 3, 2013 to fill the 54th Assembly District seat vacated by Holly Mitchell upon her election to the California State Senate. He resigned from office December 31, 2017. Prior to his election to the Assembly in 2014, he was an aide for former State Senator Curren Price. He is the son of longtime Los Angeles politician Mark Ridley-Thomas.

== Early life and education ==
Ridley-Thomas is the son of Avis Ridley-Thomas and Mark Ridley-Thomas, a former member of the Los Angeles City Council. He earned a Bachelor of Arts degree in sociology from Morehouse College.

== California State Assembly ==
During his tenure in the Assembly, Ridley-Thomas chaired the Elections & Redistricting and Revenue & Taxation committees, as well as the Select Committee on Mental Health. He was also a member of the Assembly Appropriations, Rules, Joint Rules, Health, Water, Public Safety, Local Government, Public Safety, Public Employment & Retirement, and Labor & Employment committees.

=== Sexual harassment allegations and resignation ===
On December 27, 2017, Ridley-Thomas announced that he would resign from the State Assembly on December 31. He cited unspecified health problems in his statement and said he would need "an extended period of time to recuperate.

In August 2018, the Los Angeles Times reported that Ridley-Thomas was "the subject of two sexual harassment complaints at the time he stepped down from the Legislature." An Assembly investigation released on January 16, 2019 concluded that Ridley-Thomas likely made an unwanted sexual advance toward a female Capitol staffer two years prior.

== University of Southern California ==
After Ridley-Thomas resigned from the Assembly in December 2017, he entered a Master of Social Work program at the University of Southern California with a scholarship from the university. USC also hired him as a professor of practice of social work and public policy.

In August 2018, the Los Angeles Times reported that USC had recently fired Ridley-Thomas "amid questions about his appointment and a $100,000 donation to the school from his father's campaign funds."

On October 13, 2021, the United States Attorney for the Central District of California announced that a federal grand jury had indicted Ridley-Thomas's father and former USC Dean of Social Work Marilyn L. Flynn for "a bribery scheme in which [Sebastian Ridley-Thomas] received substantial benefits from the university in exchange for [Ridley-Thomas's father] supporting county contracts and lucrative contract amendments with the university..."

== Post-electoral career ==
After leaving office, Ridley-Thomas briefly became a lobbyist in Sacramento until backlash from his alleged harassing behavior forced him to withdraw. He later relocated to Nevada. He is a supporter of President Donald Trump and endorsed him in the 2024 presidential election.

== Electoral history ==
=== 2014 California State Assembly election ===
California's 54th State Assembly district election, 2014
Primary election
Party	Candidate	Votes	%
Democratic	Sebastian Ridley-Thomas (incumbent)	34,444	78.2
Republican	Glen Ratcliff	9,585	21.8
Total votes		44,029	100.0
General election
Democratic	Sebastian Ridley-Thomas (incumbent)	66,082	79.1
Republican	Glen Ratcliff	17,506	20.9
Total votes		83,588	100.0
Democratic hold			

=== 2016 California State Assembly election ===
California's 54th State Assembly district election, 2016
Primary election
Party	Candidate	Votes	%
Democratic	Sebastian Ridley-Thomas (incumbent)	83,889	83.2
Republican	Glen Ratcliff	16,880	16.8
Total votes		100,769	100.0
General election
Democratic	Sebastian Ridley-Thomas (incumbent)	146,723	81.6
Republican	Glen Ratcliff	33,119	18.4
Total votes		179,842	100.0
Democratic hold			
