= Sydney Kamlager-Dove =

American politician (born 1972)

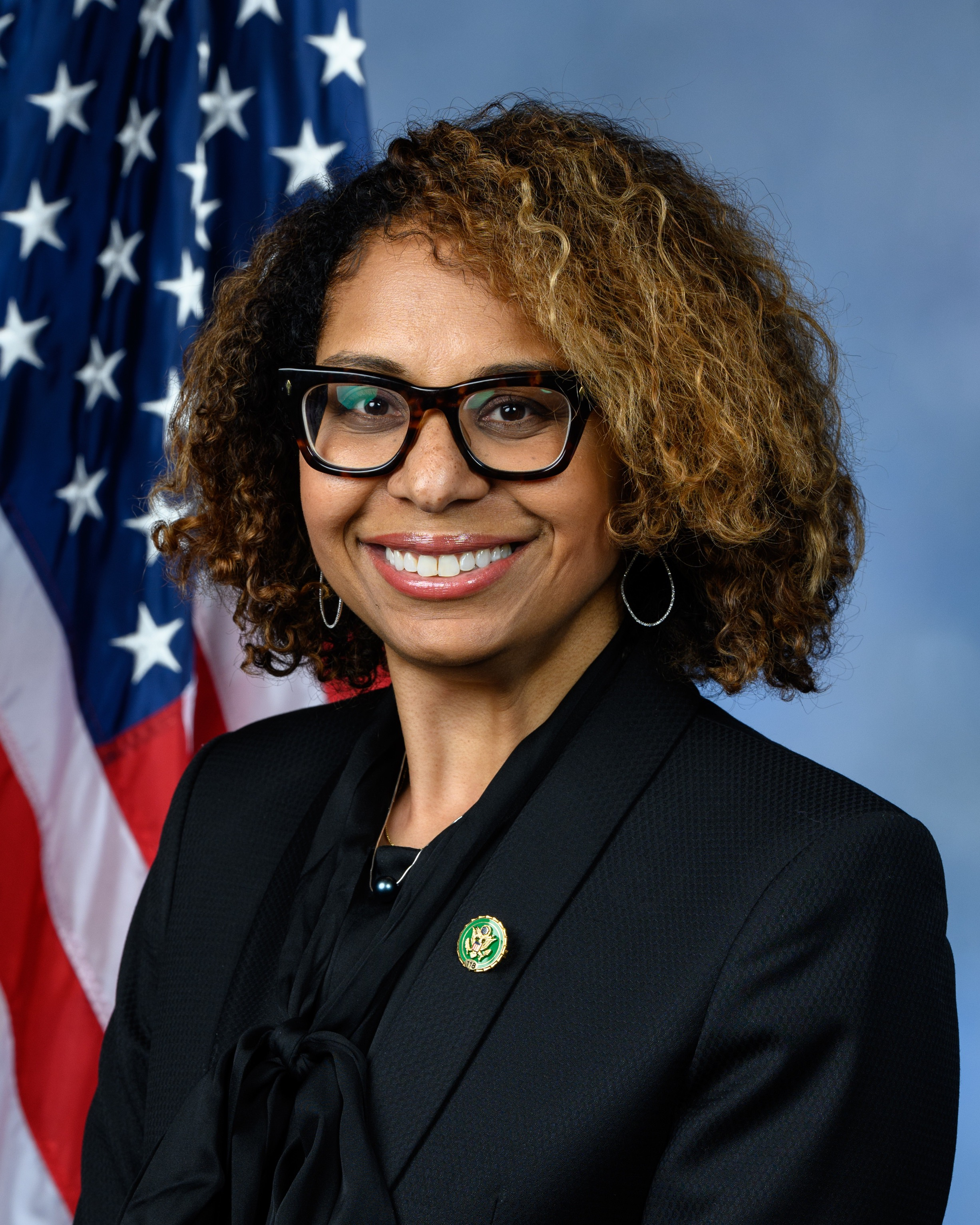
- Official Portrait, 2023

Member of the U.S. House of Representatives from California's 37th district
- Incumbent
- Assumed office January 3, 2023
- Preceded by: Karen Bass

Member of the California State Senate from the 30th district
- In office March 11, 2021 – December 5, 2022
- Preceded by: Holly Mitchell
- Succeeded by: Bob Archuleta (redistricted)

Member of the California State Assembly from the 54th district
- In office April 16, 2018 – March 11, 2021
- Preceded by: Sebastian Ridley-Thomas
- Succeeded by: Isaac Bryan

Personal details
- Born: Sydney Kai Kamlager; July 20, 1972 (age 54) Chicago, Illinois, U.S.
- Party: Democratic
- Spouse: Austin Dove (m. 2006)
- Relatives: Kerry James Marshall (stepfather)
- Education: Compton College (attended); University of Southern California (BA); Carnegie Mellon University (MA)
- Website: House website Campaign website
- Kamlager-Dove's voice Kamlager-Dove questioning witnesses on the refugee application process following the Fall of Kabul; Recorded March 8, 2023

Sydney Kai Kamlager-Dove (/ˌkæmlɑːɡər-ˈdʌv/ KAM-lah-gər-DUV; née Kamlager; born July 20, 1972) is an American politician serving as the U.S. representative for California's 37th congressional district since 2023. A Democrat, she previously served in the California State Senate, representing the 30th district. She has also served in the California State Assembly and as a trustee for the Los Angeles Community College District.

== Early life and education ==
Sydney Kamlager-Dove was born in Chicago, Illinois. Her mother, actress Cheryl Lynn Bruce, is black and her father, Don Kamlager, is white. "Being the product of an interracial marriage really set the tone for how I see people and how I see myself," she has said. Her stepfather is artist Kerry James Marshall. She graduated from Saint Ignatius College Prep, a Jesuit high school. She attended the University of Southern California in Los Angeles, where she earned a Bachelor of Arts in political science. She is a member of the Zeta Phi Beta sorority. She received her Master of Arts in arts management from the Heinz College at Carnegie Mellon University.

== Career ==
In 1996, Kamlager-Dove was the spokesperson for the Social and Public Art Resource Center (SPARC) in Venice, California. A year later, she was the organization's public art director during the restoration of the Venice graffiti pit. After leaving SPARC, Kamlager-Dove worked as an assistant to actor Delroy Lindo. She later worked as a public affairs director for the nonprofit child care corporation Crystal Stairs, headed at the time by Holly Mitchell.

In 2010, Kamlager-Dove worked on the campaign to elect Mitchell to the California State Assembly, becoming district director after Mitchell's victory. In 2015, she ran for Seat 3 of the board of trustees for the Los Angeles Community College District. On March 3, 2015, she defeated three other candidates with a 42% plurality. Kamlager-Dove has sat on the board of Planned Parenthood Los Angeles.

== California State Assembly (2018–2021) ==
After Sebastian Ridley-Thomas announced his resignation from the State Assembly on December 27, 2017, Kamlager entered the race to serve the remainder of his term. She won the April 3, 2018, special election to represent California's 54th State Assembly district.

Kamlager was an advocate for racial equity, access, and social justice in the California State Assembly. She was vocal about restoring voting rights to parolees, strengthening standards for police use of force, and stopping the NCAA from preventing student athletes from receiving payment in connection with the use of their name, image, or likeness. In 2019, she co-authored SB 188, the CROWN Act, which prohibits employers from enforcing policies surrounding "race-neutral" grooming or discriminating against people wearing natural or protective hairstyles.

During her tenure in the Assembly, Kamlager-Dove sat on the following standing committees: Public Safety, Arts and Entertainment, Communications and Conveyance, Insurance, and the powerful Rules committee. She chaired the Select Committee on Incarcerated Women and led the legislature's Los Angeles County Delegation. In 2020, Kamlager-Dove was appointed by the Speaker of the California State Assembly to serve on the Committee on Revision of the Penal Code.

=== Legislation ===
==== Fiscal issues ====
Kamlager-Dove sponsored AB 987, legislation to build a new arena for the Los Angeles Clippers. The bill was signed into law.

==== Social issues ====
Kamlager-Dove sponsored two bills, AB 241 and AB 242, to mandate the incorporation of implicit bias training into continued education for healthcare professionals, lawyers, and judges. The bills were intended to reduce disparities in health care and the judicial system in California.

Kamlager-Dove sponsored California's first hunting ban in decades with AB 1254, which ends the trophy hunting of bobcats, except under specified circumstances, until January 1, 2025.

Kamlager Dove co-authored the California CROWN Act.

== California State Senate (2021–2023) ==
On November 10, 2020, Kamlager-Dove announced her candidacy for the California State Senate to succeed Holly Mitchell, who was elected to the Los Angeles County Board of Supervisors. On March 2, 2021, Kamlager-Dove was elected with 67.67% of the vote.

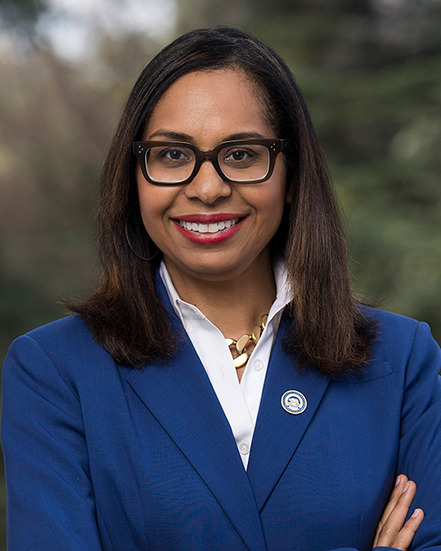
Official California Senate portrait of Kamlager-Dove, 2021

== U.S. House of Representatives (2023-present) ==
=== 2022 election ===
In November 2022, Kamlager-Dove was elected to the U.S. House of Representatives for California's 37th congressional district, replacing Karen Bass, who successfully ran for mayor of Los Angeles.

=== Tenure ===
Before her election in 2022, she told The Jewish Journal of Los Angeles that Israel is "an example of what a young, vibrant democracy looks like, and we should be supporting it," and that she doesn't subscribe to the anti-Israel rhetoric in her party. On April 16, 2024, the House passed a resolution declaring that the saying, "From the river to the sea, Palestine will be free" is an antisemitic slogan. Kamlager-Dove joined with Rep. Ilhan Omar and Rep. Rashida Tlaib, and 40 other Democrats in voting against it.

On April 1, 2025, Kamlager-Dove accused journalist Matt Taibbi of being a "serial sexual harasser" during a hearing on a subcommittee of the House Foreign Affairs Committee. On April 3, Taibbi announced a $10 million libel suit against her.

On June 3, 2026, Kamlager-Dove had a fiery exchange with Secretary of State Marco Rubio at a hearing of the House Foreign Affairs Committee.

=== Committee assignments ===
For the 119th Congress:

- Committee on Foreign Affairs
  - Subcommittee on South and Central Asia (Ranking Member)
  - Subcommittee on Western Hemisphere
- Committee on the Judiciary
  - Subcommittee on Courts, Intellectual Property, Artificial Intelligence, and the Internet
  - Subcommittee on The Constitution and Limited Government

=== Caucus memberships ===
- Black Maternal Health Caucus
- Congressional Black Caucus
- Congressional Brazil Caucus (co-chair)
- Congressional Caucus for the Equal Rights Amendment (vice-chair)
- Congressional Equality Caucus
- Congressional Progressive Caucus
- Congressional Caucus on Foster Youth (co-chair)
- Congressional Ukraine Caucus

== Electoral history ==
Electoral history of Sydney Kamlager-Dove
Year	Office	Party	Primary			General			Result	Swing	Ref.
Year	Office	Party	Total	%	P.	Total	%	P.	Result	Swing	Ref.
2015	LACCD Board of Trustees	Non-partisan	1,366	41.49%	1st				Won	N/A	
2018	State Assembly	Democratic	22,605	68.96%	1st				Won	Hold	(Note: One candidate received a majority (over 50%) of the votes cast in the primary; therefore, no special general election was held.)
2018	State Assembly	Democratic	41,838	55.53%	1st	95,643	62.35%	1st	Won	Hold	
2020	State Assembly	Democratic	64,620	56.68%	1st	119,818	64.17%	1st	Won	Hold	
2021	State Senate	Democratic	48,483	68.70%	1st				Won	Hold	
2022	U.S. House	Democratic	42,628	43.72%	1st	84,338	63.95%	1st	Won	Hold	
2024	U.S. House	Democratic	62,413	71.81%	1st	160,364	78.30%	1st	Won	Hold	
2026	U.S. House	Democratic	70,990	55.18%	1st	TBD					
Source: Secretary of State of California | Statewide Election Results

== Personal life ==
Kamlager-Dove lives in View Park with her husband, Austin Dove, a civil rights and criminal defense attorney, her two step-children, and their rescue pets. She is a Lutheran.

== See also ==
- List of African-American United States representatives
- Women in the United States House of Representatives

== Notes ==
U.S. House of Representatives
Preceded by Karen Bass	Member of the U.S. House of Representatives from California's 37th congressional district 2023–present	Incumbent
U.S. order of precedence (ceremonial)
Preceded by John James	United States representatives by seniority 320th	Succeeded by Thomas Kean Jr.
