= California's 54th State Assembly district =

American legislative district

Current assemblymember
Mark Gonzalez; D–Los Angeles
- Population (2010) • Voting age • Citizen voting age: 466,445; 375,241; 294,720
- Demographics: 29.45% White; 25.20% Black; 30.50% Latino; 12.73% Asian; 0.29% Native American; 0.17% Hawaiian/Pacific Islander; 0.59% other; 1.07% remainder of multiracial
- Registered voters: 316,478
- Registration: 63.73% Democratic; 8.67% Republican; 22.89% No party preference

California's 54th State Assembly district is one of 80 California State Assembly districts. It is currently represented by Mark Gonzalez of Los Angeles.

== District profile ==
Before the 2020 - 2022 redistricting, the district encompassed parts of the Westside and South Los Angeles, reaching almost to the Pacific Ocean. The current 54th district includes East Hollywood, Silver Lake, Echo Park, Koreatown, Pico-Union, Los Feliz, Downtown L.A., Chinatown, Boyle Heights, Commerce, Montebello and Vernon among other neighborhoods and municipalities. The district is ethnically diverse and heavily urban.

Los Angeles County – 4.8%

- Culver City
- Inglewood – 0.3%
- Ladera Heights
- Los Angeles – 10.8%
  - Baldwin Hills
  - Century City
  - Crenshaw
  - Leimert Park
  - Mar Vista – partial
  - Mid-City
  - West Los Angeles
  - Westwood
- View Park-Windsor Hills

== Election results from statewide races ==
Year	Office	Results
2021	Recall	No 85.6 – 14.4%
2020	President	Biden 83.1 - 13.5%
2018	Governor	Newsom 86.1 – 13.9%
2018	Senator	Feinstein 65.0 – 35.0%
2016	President	Clinton 85.1 – 10.1%
2016	Senator	Harris 76.9 – 23.1%
2014	Governor	Brown 82.9 – 17.2%
2012	President	Obama 83.6 – 13.9%
2012	Senator	Feinstein 85.2 – 14.8%

== List of assembly members representing the district ==
Due to redistricting, the 54th district has been moved around different parts of the state. The current iteration resulted from the 2021 redistricting by the California Citizens Redistricting Commission.

Assembly members	Party	Years served	Counties represented	Notes
Walter Minton Heywood	Republican	January 5, 1885 – January 3, 1887	Alameda	
Francis Morgan Cooley	Republican	January 3, 1887 – January 7, 1889	Alameda	
Edwin Sherer Culver	Republican	January 7, 1889 – January 2, 1893	Alameda	
H. H. Johnson	Democratic	January 2, 1893 – January 7, 1895	Santa Clara	
Cyrus P. Berry	Republican	January 7, 1895 – January 4, 1897	Santa Clara	
N. E. Malcolm	Republican	January 4, 1897 – January 2, 1899	Santa Clara	
Walter A. Clark	Republican	January 2, 1899 – January 1, 1901	Santa Clara	
Eli Wright	Good Government	January 1, 1901 – January 5, 1903	Santa Clara	
A. D. Duffey	Democratic	January 5, 1903 – February 10, 1903	Santa Clara	Lost the election after being in office for 1 month.
Harry S. Wanzer	Republican	February 10, 1903 – March 16, 1903	Santa Clara	Won election and took his seat. He resigned 1 month of being in office.
Vacant		March 16, 1903 – January 2, 1905	Santa Clara	
George C. Cleveland	Republican	January 2, 1905 – January 7, 1907	Santa Clara	
Harry C. Lucas	Republican	January 7, 1907 – January 4, 1909	Santa Clara	
John B. Maher	Democratic	January 4, 1909 – January 6, 1913	Santa Clara	
Joseph Warner Guiberson	Democratic	January 6, 1913 – January 4, 1915	Kings	
William Adams Long	Republican	January 4, 1915 – January 6, 1919	Kings	
Oscar L. Odale	Democratic	January 6, 1919 – January 3, 1921	Kings	
Frank Johnson	Republican	January 3, 1921 – January 3, 1927	Kings	
Augustus F. Jewett Jr.	Republican	January 3, 1927 – January 5, 1931	Kings	
William G. Bonelli	Republican	January 5, 1931 – January 2, 1933	Los Angeles	
Frank J. Rogers	Democratic	January 2, 1933 – January 7, 1935	Los Angeles	
Wilbur F. Gilbert	Democratic	January 7, 1935 – January 6, 1941	Los Angeles	
John B. Knight	Republican	January 6, 1941 – January 8, 1945	Los Angeles	
Ralph A. Beal	Independent	January 8, 1945 – January 6, 1947	Los Angeles	
Bud Collier	Republican	January 6, 1947 – November 30, 1974	Los Angeles	
Frank Vicencia	Democratic	December 2, 1974 – November 30, 1986	Los Angeles	
Paul E. Zeltner	Republican	December 1, 1986 – November 30, 1988	Los Angeles	
Willard H. Murray Jr.	Democratic	December 5, 1988 – November 30, 1992	Los Angeles	
Betty Karnette	Democratic	December 7, 1992 – November 30, 1994	Los Angeles	
Steven T. Kuykendall	Republican	December 5, 1994 – November 30, 1998	Los Angeles	
Alan Lowenthal	Democratic	December 7, 1998 – November 30, 2004	Los Angeles	
Betty Karnette	Democratic	December 6, 2004 – November 30, 2008	Los Angeles	
Bonnie Lowenthal	Democratic	December 1, 2008 – November 30, 2012	Los Angeles	
Holly Mitchell	Democratic	December 3, 2012 – September 26, 2013	Los Angeles	Resigned from the California State Assembly to be sworn in as a State Senator representing the 30th State Senate district.
Vacant		September 26, 2013 – December 5, 2013	Los Angeles	
Sebastian Ridley-Thomas	Democratic	December 5, 2013 – December 31, 2017	Los Angeles	Resigned from the Assembly due to unspecified health problems.
Vacant		December 31, 2017 – April 16, 2018	Los Angeles	
Sydney Kamlager	Democratic	April 16, 2018 – March 11, 2021	Los Angeles	Won special election and was sworn in. Resigned from the California State Assembly to be sworn in as a State Senator representing the 30th State Senate district.
Vacant		March 11, 2021 – May 28, 2021	Los Angeles	
Isaac Bryan	Democratic	May 28, 2021 – November 30, 2022	Los Angeles	Won special election and was sworn in May 28, 2021.
Miguel Santiago	Democratic	December 5, 2022 – November 30, 2024	Los Angeles	
Mark Gonzalez	Democratic	December 2, 2024 – present	Los Angeles	

== Election results (1990–present) ==
=== 2024 ===
2024 California State Assembly 54th district election
Primary election
Party	Candidate	Votes	%
Democratic	Mark Gonzalez	19,616	45.2
Democratic	John Yi	14,963	34.5
Republican	Elaine Alaniz	8,819	20.3
Total votes		43,398	100.0
General election
Democratic	Mark Gonzalez	59,549	56.3
Democratic	John Yi	46,309	43.7
Total votes		105,858	100.0
Democratic hold			

=== 2022 ===
2022 California State Assembly 54th district election
Primary election
Party	Candidate	Votes	%
Democratic	Miguel Santiago (incumbent)	37,714	99.7
Republican	Elaine Alaniz (write-in)	129	0.3
Total votes		37,843	100.0
General election
Democratic	Miguel Santiago (incumbent)	53,993	78.6
Republican	Elaine Alaniz	14,704	21.4
Total votes		68,697	100.0
Democratic hold			

=== 2021 (special) ===
2021 California State Assembly 54th district special election Vacancy resulting from the resignation of Sydney Kamlager
Primary election
Party	Candidate	Votes	%
Democratic	Isaac Bryan	21,472	50.8
Democratic	Heather Hutt	10,538	24.9
Democratic	Cheryl Turner	4,072	9.6
Democratic	Dallas Denise Fowler	3,235	7.6
No party preference	Bernard Senter	1,667	3.9
Democratic	Samuel Morales	1,304	3.1
Total votes		42,288	100.0
Democratic hold			

=== 2020 ===
2020 California State Assembly 54th district election
Primary election
Party	Candidate	Votes	%
Democratic	Sydney Kamlager (incumbent)	64,620	56.7
Democratic	Tracy Bernard Jones	34,005	29.8
Republican	Glen Ratcliff	10,880	9.5
Democratic	Clinton Brown	4,513	4.0
Total votes		114,018	100.0
General election
Democratic	Sydney Kamlager (incumbent)	119,818	64.2
Democratic	Tracy Bernard Jones	66,915	35.8
Total votes		186,733	100.0
Democratic hold			

=== 2018 ===
2018 California State Assembly 54th district election
Primary election
Party	Candidate	Votes	%
Democratic	Sydney Kamlager (incumbent)	41,838	55.5
Democratic	Tepring Michelle Piquado	11,615	15.4
Republican	Glen Ratcliff	9,359	12.4
Democratic	Steve Dunwoody	6,409	8.5
Democratic	Lamar Lyons	4,899	6.5
Democratic	Breon Dupree Hollie	1,223	1.6
Total votes		75,343	100.0
General election
Democratic	Sydney Kamlager (incumbent)	95,643	62.3
Democratic	Tepring Michelle Piquado	57,760	37.7
Total votes		153,403	100.0
Democratic hold			

=== 2018 (special) ===
2018 California State Assembly 54th district special election Vacancy resulting from the resignation of Sebastian Ridley-Thomas
Primary election
Party	Candidate	Votes	%
Democratic	Sydney Kamlager	22,605	69.0
Democratic	Tepring Michelle Piquado	4,673	14.3
Republican	Glen Ratcliff	3,826	11.7
Democratic	Grayson A. Pangilinan	1,182	3.6
Democratic	Steve Dunwoody (write-in)	495	1.5
Total votes		32,781	100.0
Democratic hold			

=== 2016 ===
2016 California State Assembly 54th district election
Primary election
Party	Candidate	Votes	%
Democratic	Sebastian Ridley-Thomas (incumbent)	83,889	83.2
Republican	Glen Ratcliff	16,880	16.8
Total votes		100,769	100.0
General election
Democratic	Sebastian Ridley-Thomas (incumbent)	146,723	81.6
Republican	Glen Ratcliff	33,119	18.4
Total votes		179,842	100.0
Democratic hold			

=== 2014 ===
2014 California State Assembly 54th district election
Primary election
Party	Candidate	Votes	%
Democratic	Sebastian Ridley-Thomas (incumbent)	34,444	78.2
Republican	Glen Ratcliff	9,585	21.8
Total votes		44,029	100.0
General election
Democratic	Sebastian Ridley-Thomas (incumbent)	66,082	79.1
Republican	Glen Ratcliff	17,506	20.9
Total votes		83,588	100.0
Democratic hold			

=== 2013 (special) ===
2013 California State Assembly 54th district special election Vacancy resulting from the resignation of Holly Mitchell
Primary election
Party	Candidate	Votes	%
Democratic	Sebastian Ridley-Thomas	13,992	60.2
Democratic	Christopher R. Armenta	8,270	35.6
Democratic	John Jake	931	4.0
No party preference	Morry Waksberg (write-in)	31	0.1
Total votes		23,224	100.0
Democratic hold			

=== 2012 ===
2012 California State Assembly 54th district election
Primary election
Party	Candidate	Votes	%
Democratic	Holly Mitchell (incumbent)	33,920	70.9
Republican	Keith Brandon McCowen	8,350	17.4
Democratic	Ed Nicoletti	5,601	11.7
Total votes		47,871	100.0
General election
Democratic	Holly Mitchell (incumbent)	143,530	83.3
Republican	Keith Brandon McCowen	28,688	16.7
Total votes		172,218	100.0
Democratic hold			

=== 2010 ===
2010 California State Assembly 54th district election
Party	Candidate	Votes	%
Democratic	Bonnie Lowenthal (incumbent)	73,775	56.7
Republican	Martha E. Flores-Gibson	56,535	43.3
Total votes		130,310	100.0
Democratic hold			

=== 2008 ===
2008 California State Assembly 54th district election
Party	Candidate	Votes	%
Democratic	Bonnie Lowenthal	95,350	57.1
Republican	Gabriella Holt	61,650	36.9
Libertarian	John Kling	9,896	5.9
Total votes		166,896	100.0
Democratic hold			

=== 2006 ===
2006 California State Assembly 54th district election
Party	Candidate	Votes	%
Democratic	Betty Karnette (incumbent)	69,890	60.8
Republican	Michael Jackson	45,128	39.2
Total votes		115,018	100.0
Democratic hold			

=== 2004 ===
2004 California State Assembly 54th district election
Party	Candidate	Votes	%
Democratic	Betty Karnette	89,987	53.5
Republican	Steven T. Kuykendall	73,701	43.8
Libertarian	John Howard Sterne	4,544	2.7
Total votes		168,232	100.0
Democratic hold			

=== 2002 ===
2002 California State Assembly 54th district election
Party	Candidate	Votes	%
Democratic	Alan Lowenthal (incumbent)	59,726	60.1
Republican	Cesar N. Castellanos	39,714	39.9
Total votes		99,440	100.0
Democratic hold			

=== 2000 ===
2000 California State Assembly 54th district election
Party	Candidate	Votes	%
Democratic	Alan Lowenthal (incumbent)	83,000	58.6
Republican	Rudy Svorinich, Jr.	54,938	38.9
Libertarian	Dale F. Ogden	3,719	2.6
Total votes		141,657	100.0
Democratic hold			

=== 1998 ===
1998 California State Assembly 54th district election
Party	Candidate	Votes	%
Democratic	Alan Lowenthal	54,330	49.6
Republican	Julie Alban	51,291	46.8
Libertarian	Al Carlan	2,073	1.9
American Independent	George P. "Phil" Drake	1,902	1.7
Total votes		109,596	100.0
Democratic gain from Republican			

=== 1996 ===
1996 California State Assembly 54th district election
Party	Candidate	Votes	%
Republican	Steven T. Kuykendall (incumbent)	66,421	50.7
Democratic	Gerrie Schipske	64,695	49.3
Total votes		131,116	100.0
Republican hold			

=== 1994 ===
1994 California State Assembly 54th district election
Party	Candidate	Votes	%
Republican	Steven T. Kuykendall	56,225	47.6
Democratic	Betty Karnette (incumbent)	55,628	47.1
Libertarian	Alan J. Carlan	3,981	3.4
Peace and Freedom	Patrick John McCoy	2,351	2.0
Total votes		118,185	100.0
Republican gain from Democratic			

=== 1992 ===
1992 California State Assembly 54th district election
Party	Candidate	Votes	%
Democratic	Betty Karnette	78,400	51.9
Republican	Gerald N. Felando (incumbent)	66,282	43.9
American Independent	Joseph G. "Joe" Fields	6,264	4.1
Total votes		150,946	100.0
Democratic hold			

=== 1990 ===
1990 California State Assembly 54th district election
Party	Candidate	Votes	%
Democratic	Willard H. Murray Jr. (incumbent)	29,981	50.0
Republican	Emily Hart-Holifield	24,663	41.2
Libertarian	Art Olivier	3,520	5.9
Peace and Freedom	Norman E. Lynn	1,764	2.9
Total votes		59,928	100.0
Democratic hold			

== See also ==
- California State Assembly
- California State Assembly districts
- Districts in California
