= Miguel Santiago =

American politician

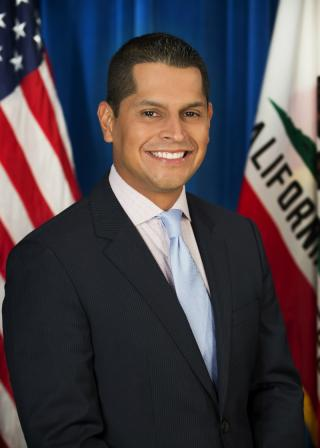
- Official portrait, 2014

Member of the California Assembly
- In office December 1, 2014 – November 30, 2024
- Preceded by: John Pérez
- Succeeded by: Mark Gonzalez
- Constituency: 53rd district (2014–2022); 54th district (2022–2024)

Personal details
- Born: March 6, 1973 (age 53) Los Angeles, California, U.S.
- Party: Democratic
- Spouse: Celina Santiago
- Children: 2
- Education: University of California, Los Angeles (BA)
- Website: Official website

Miguel Santiago (born March 6, 1973) is an American politician who served in the California State Assembly from 2014 to 2024. Santiago is a Democrat who represented the 54th Assembly District, which encompasses parts of Downtown Los Angeles, along with East Hollywood, Boyle Heights, Montebello, Commerce, and Vernon.

Santiago was a member of the California Latino Legislative Caucus and the California Legislative Progressive Caucus. He served as chairman of the Communications and Conveyance Committee prior to his retirement. Prior to being elected to the Assembly in 2014, he was a member of the Los Angeles Community College District Board of Trustees. He also served as District Director to former Assembly Speaker John Pérez.

== Net Neutrality Bill Co-Authorship ==
Santiago co-authored S.B. 822 alongside Senator Scott Wiener, legislation that would strengthen net neutrality protections in California. Hours after being signed into law by Governor Jerry Brown, a Motion for Preliminary Injunction was filed by the Department of Justice. Both parties have agreed to wait until a separate court case in the D.C. Circuit Court is decided before moving on. As part of the agreement, the law is not currently being enforced and the injunction was withdrawn.

After passing the California Senate, S.B. 822 was amended by Miguel Santiago in June 2018. SB-822 would restore Obama-era rules that the Republican-controlled Federal Communications Commission rolled back in December 2017. Santiago's amendments removed all provisions of the bill's net neutrality protections that were not in the text of the 2015 Open Internet Order, leaving in only those that were in the two-pages of rules. This prompted the bill's original sponsor, Senator Scott Wiener, to pull his support for his own bill and declare that it had been "hijacked" and that he was "not interested in passing a bill that is watered down so severely." The changes also included deleting a large section of definitions, which critics claim could make it more difficult for California's attorney general to prosecute violations of the legislation.

The amendments, published less than 12 hours before the hearing, were approved 8-0[6] by the Communications and Conveyance committee, which Santiago chairs, on June 20, 2018. That vote occurred before Wiener could argue against them and before any testimony. After the testimony, the amended bill was approved 8-2. Opponents of the amended version stated that Santiago's changes would create loopholes through which broadband providers could charge fees to content providers while exempting their own content from any data caps. Proponents of the changes contend that without them broadband providers would not be allowed to offer free mobile data that doesn't count against users' caps, harming consumers, and that net neutrality in general would discourage providers from improving their network infrastructure. Representatives of major ISPs continue to oppose the bill, even in its amended form.

Santiago received over $60,000 from telecom lobbyists, with AT&T and Comcast being the top telecom contributors, over the course of his assembly career. However, Wiener said that despite the "strenuous disagreement here, [...] it’s not about campaign contributions" and that the telecoms "spent a lot of money in California targeting members with Twitter and Facebook ads, doing robo-calls to seniors telling them their bills are going to go up, that this bill is going to make your monthly payment go up. They flooded the capitol with lobbyists."

On June 6, 2018, Santiago released a press statement saying that his amendments were intended to help "deliver a bill that could withstand legal challenges from the telecommunications industry" and that "we ran out of time" to reach an agreement with Wiener. Knowing Wiener would not support the changes, the committee "took action to insert amendments without his consent to keep the bill moving." Santiago expressed regret at the "legislative maneuverings" required to advance the bill and that he does not "envision policy being created in this manner." The public response was intense, and Santiago stated that his family had received threats and that offensive memes smearing his wife and children had been shared online.

== Electoral history ==
2014 California State Assembly election, 53rd district
Primary election
Party	Candidate	Votes	%
Democratic	Miguel Santiago	9,387	56.1
Democratic	Sandra Mendoza	3,953	23.6
Democratic	Michelle "Hope" Walker	1,964	11.7
Democratic	Michael "Mike" Aldapa	1,423	8.5
Total votes		16,727	100.0
General election
Democratic	Miguel Santiago	20,472	63.5
Democratic	Sandra Mendoza	11,735	36.5
Total votes		32,207	100.0
Democratic hold			

2016 California State Assembly election, 53rd district
Primary election
Party	Candidate	Votes	%
Democratic	Miguel Santiago (incumbent)	22,254	45.1
Democratic	Sandra Mendoza	20,388	41.3
Democratic	Kevin H. Jang	6,688	13.6
Total votes		49,330	100.0
General election
Democratic	Miguel Santiago (incumbent)	50,958	58.2
Democratic	Sandra Mendoza	36,583	41.8
Total votes		87,541	100.0
Democratic hold			

2018 California State Assembly election, 53rd district
Primary election
Party	Candidate	Votes	%
Democratic	Miguel Santiago (incumbent)	24,134	69.0
Democratic	Kevin Hee Young Jang	5,779	16.5
Libertarian	Michael A. Lewis	2,710	7.7
Democratic	Rae Elisabeth Henry	2,367	6.8
Total votes		34,990	100.0
General election
Democratic	Miguel Santiago (incumbent)	57,388	71.4
Democratic	Kevin Hee Young Jang	23,002	28.6
Total votes		80,390	100.0
Democratic hold			

2020 California State Assembly election, 53rd district
Primary election
Party	Candidate	Votes	%
Democratic	Miguel Santiago (incumbent)	35,515	62.9%
Democratic	Godfrey Santos Plata	20,923	37.1%
Total votes			
Democratic hold			

2022 California's 54th State Assembly district election
Primary election
Party	Candidate	Votes	%
Democratic	Miguel Santiago (incumbent)	37,714	99.7
Republican	Elaine Alaniz (write-in)	129	0.3
Total votes		37,843	100%
General election
Democratic	Miguel Santiago (incumbent)	53,993	78.6
Republican	Elaine Alaniz	14,704	21.4
Total votes		68,697	100%
Democratic hold			
