= Holly Mitchell =

American politician (born 1964)

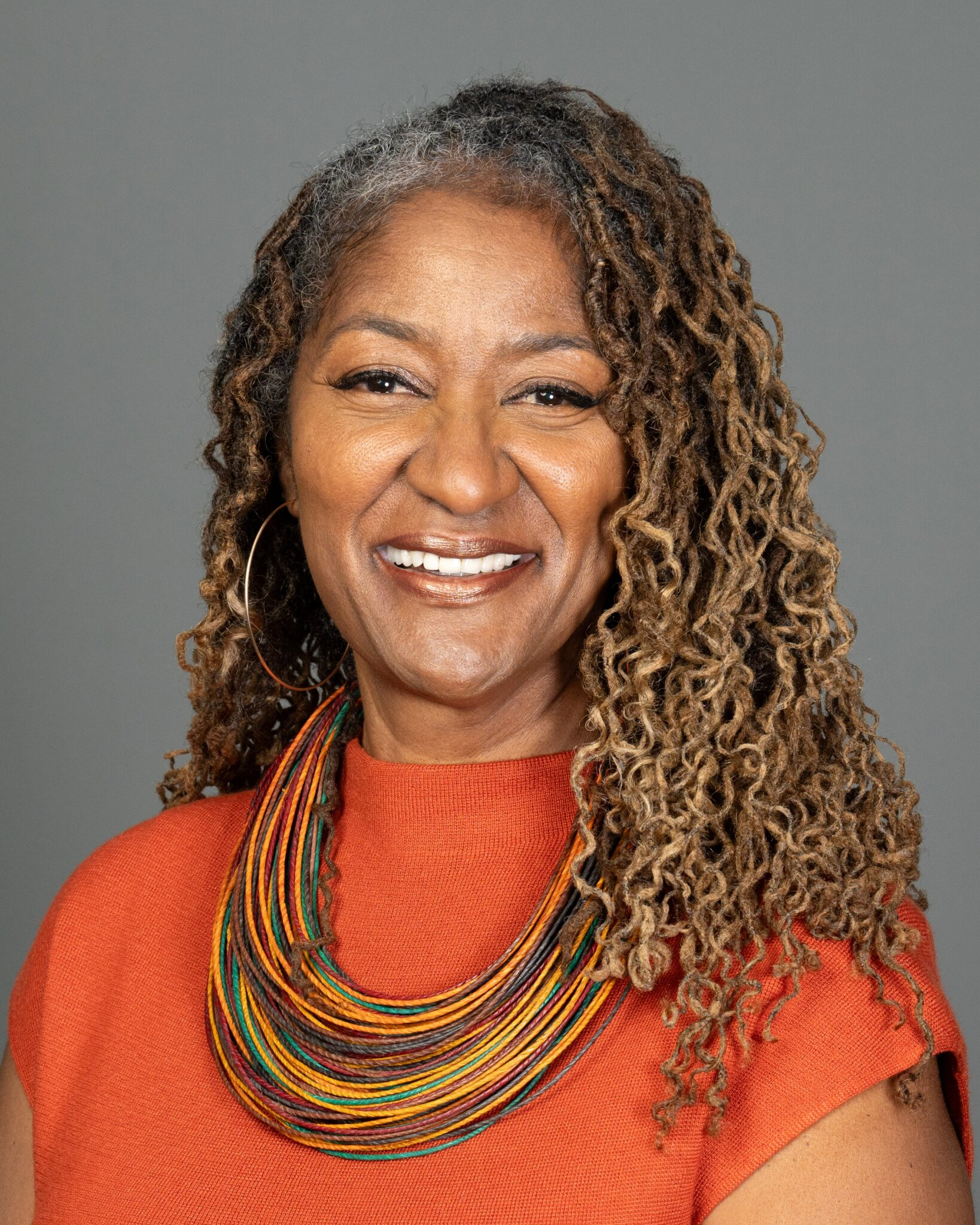
- Official portrait, 2024

Chair of Los Angeles County
- In office December 7, 2021 – December 6, 2022
- Preceded by: Hilda Solis
- Succeeded by: Janice Hahn

Member of the Los Angeles County Board of Supervisors from the 2nd district
- Incumbent
- Assumed office December 6, 2020
- Preceded by: Mark Ridley-Thomas

Member of the California State Senate
- In office September 26, 2013 – December 6, 2020
- Preceded by: Curren Price
- Succeeded by: Sydney Kamlager
- Constituency: 26th district (2013–2014); 30th district (2014–2020)

Member of the California State Assembly
- In office December 6, 2010 – September 26, 2013
- Preceded by: Karen Bass
- Succeeded by: Sebastian Ridley-Thomas
- Constituency: 47th district (2010–2012); 54th district (2012–2013)

Personal details
- Born: Holly Jewell Mitchell; September 7, 1964 (age 61) Los Angeles, California, U.S.
- Party: Democratic
- Education: University of California, Riverside (BA)

Holly Jewell Mitchell (born September 7, 1964) is an American politician currently serving as a member of the Los Angeles County Board of Supervisors. She is the Chair pro tempore of Los Angeles County. A Democrat, Mitchell served as a state senator for California's 30th senate district from 2013 to 2020, which is also part of the 2nd supervisorial district. Prior to being elected to the State Senate, she served in the California State Assembly representing the 54th assembly district.

Mitchell is a member of the California Legislative Black Caucus. In 2016 Mitchell became the first African American to chair the Senate Budget and Fiscal Review Committee, where she has overseen the passage and adoption of two consecutive state budgets.

== Early life ==
Mitchell was born in Los Angeles to Edward Mitchell and Sylvia Johnson, both of whom worked for the government. They were both social workers when they met. After their marriage, her father was an educator and her mother was a probation officer.

== Early career ==
Before working in the Legislature, she served for seven years as CEO of the nonprofit Crystal Stairs. She also served as a Consultant to the Senate Health Committee, and as a legislative advocate for the Western Center on Law and Poverty.

== California State Senate ==
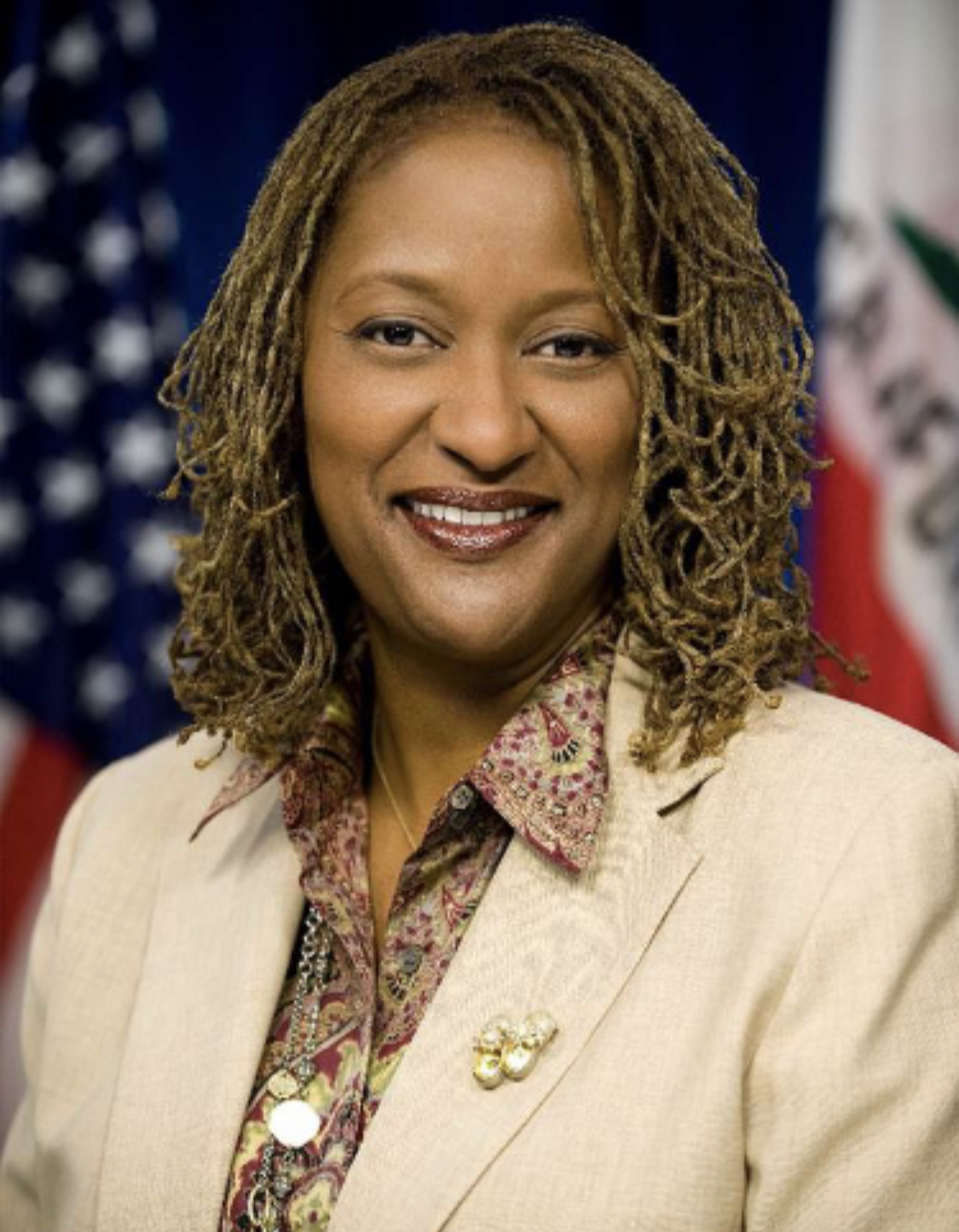
Mitchell as a State Senator.

In 2018, Mitchell was named vice chair of the Joint Legislative Subcommittee on Sexual Harassment Prevention and Response, formed in response to the #MeToo movement and several instances where accusations had forced some lawmakers to resign. Mitchell was the first African-American to serve as Chair of the Senate Budget and Fiscal Review Committee, overseeing the passage of state budgets totaling over $200 billion.

In 2019, Mitchell drafted and sponsored the CROWN (Create a Respectful and Open Workplace for Natural Hair) Act (SB 188), a California law which prohibits discrimination based on hair style and hair texture by extending protection under the FEHA and the California Education Code. It is the first legislation passed at the state level in the United States to prohibit such discrimination. The Act passed unanimously in both chambers of the California Legislature by June 27, 2019, and was signed into law on July 3, 2019. The law has since inspired similar laws across the country.

== Los Angeles County Board of Supervisors ==
Mitchell faced Los Angeles City Councilmember Herb Wesson in the 2020 race for District 2 of the Los Angeles County Board of Supervisors. She defeated Wesson by a wide margin. Her election to the Los Angeles County Board of Supervisors in 2020 marks the first time the board is composed entirely of women. Mitchell generated controversy when she said, "Law enforcement and the District Attorneys Association and the Sheriffs’ Association, who just when you look at who represents them in Sacramento, is clearly such White supremacist organizations."

Political offices
Preceded by Hilda Solis	Chair of Los Angeles County; 2021–2022	Succeeded by Janice Hahn
