= John Bliss (disambiguation) =

John Bliss (1930–2008) was an American actor.

John, Johnny or Johnathan Bliss may refer to:

People:

- John A. Bliss (1843–1925), American politician
- John C. Bliss (1868–1924), American educator
- John Murray Bliss (1771–1834), Canadian politician
- Johnny Bliss (1922–1974), Australian rugby league footballer
- Jonathan Bliss (1742–1822), Canadian lawyer
- Jack Bliss (1882–1968), American baseball player

Places:

- John Bliss House
