= 2022 California Insurance Commissioner election =

- November 8, 2022
- Registered: 21,940,274
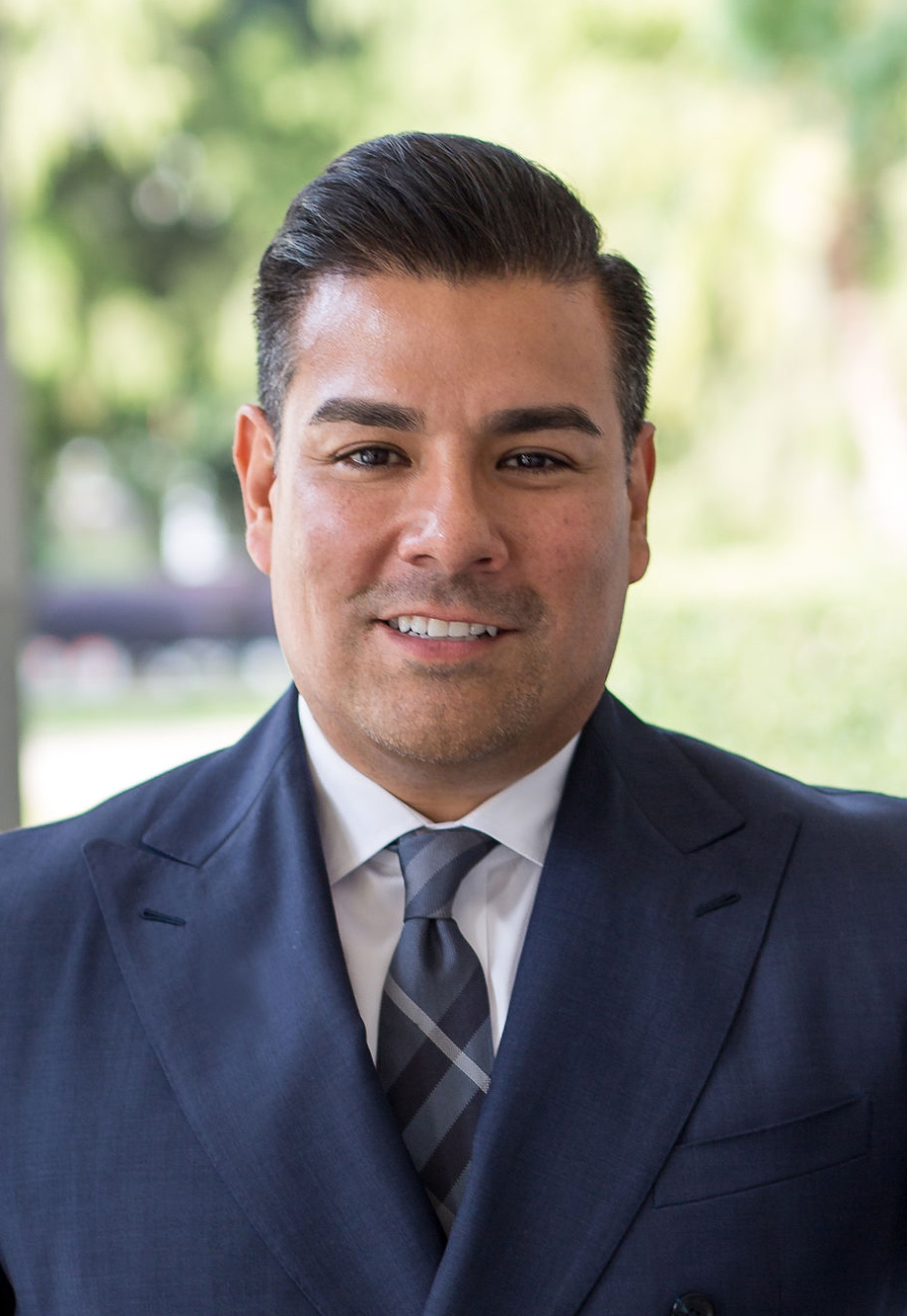

Candidate	Ricardo Lara	Robert Howell
Party	Democratic	Republican
Popular vote	6,355,915	4,249,391
Percentage	59.93%	40.07%
- Lara: 50–60% 60–70% 70–80% 80–90% Howell: 50–60% 60–70% 70–80%
Insurance Commissioner before election
Ricardo Lara
Democratic
Elected Insurance Commissioner
Ricardo Lara
Democratic

The 2022 California Insurance Commissioner election was held on November 8, 2022, to elect the Insurance Commissioner of California. Under California's nonpartisan blanket primary law, all candidates appeared on the same ballot, regardless of party. In the primary, voters may vote for any candidate, regardless of their party affiliation. The top two finishers — regardless of party — advanced to the general election in November, even if a candidate managed to receive a majority of the votes cast in the primary election. Incumbent Democratic Insurance Commissioner Ricardo Lara won re-election to a second term.

== Candidates ==
The statewide top-two primary election was set to take place on June 7, 2022.

=== Democratic Party ===
- Vinson Eugene Allen, emergency physician
- Jasper "Jay" Jackson, paralegal
- Ricardo Lara, incumbent Insurance Commissioner (2019–present)
- Marc Levine, state assemblyman for California's 10th State Assembly district (2013–present)

=== Republican Party ===
- Greg Conlon, businessman and perennial candidate
- Robert Howell, cybersecurity equipment manufacturer

=== Green Party ===
- Veronika Fimbres, nurse

=== Peace and Freedom Party ===
- Nathalie Hrizi, teacher, community activist and perennial candidate

=== No party preference ===
- Robert J. Molnar, healthcare advocate

== Endorsements ==
Robert Howell

Organizations

- California Republican Party
Nathalie Hrizi (P&F)

Organizations

- Green Party of California
- Peace and Freedom Party
Ricardo Lara (D)

U.S. Senators

- Alex Padilla, U.S. Senator from California (2021–present)

U.S. Representatives

- Julia Brownley, U.S. Representative from California's 26th congressional district (2013–present)
- Tony Cárdenas, U.S. Representative from California's 29th congressional district (2013–present)
- Lou Correa, U.S. Representative from California's 46th congressional district (2017–present)
- Mark DeSaulnier, U.S. Representative from California's 11th congressional district (2015–present)
- John Garamendi, U.S. Representative from California's 3rd congressional district (2009–present)
- Ted Lieu, U.S. Representative from California's 33rd congressional district (2015–present)
- Jimmy Panetta, U.S. Representative from California's 20th congressional district (2017–present)
- Scott Peters, U.S. Representative from California's 52nd congressional district (2013–present)

State executive officials

- Rob Bonta, Attorney General of California (2021–present)
- Jerry Brown, Governor of California (2011–2019)
- Gray Davis, Governor of California (1999–2003)
- Eleni Kounalakis, Lieutenant Governor of California (2019–present)
- Fiona Ma, Treasurer of California (2019–present)
- Gavin Newsom, Governor of California (2019–present)
- Tony Thurmond, State Superintendent of Public Instruction of California (2019–present)
- Shirley Weber, Secretary of State of California (2021–present)

State senators

- Ben Allen, California state senator from the 26th district (2014–present)
- Bob Archuleta, California state senator from the 32nd district (2018–present)
- Toni Atkins, President pro tempore of the California State Senate (2018–present)
- Bill Dodd, California state senator from the 3rd district (2016–present)
- Maria Elena Durazo, California state senator from the 24th district (2018–present)
- Susan Eggman, California state senator from the 5th district (2020–present)
- Lena Gonzalez, California state senator from the 33rd district (2019–present)
- Bob Hertzberg, California state senator from the 18th district (2014–present)
- Ben Hueso, California state senator from the 40th district (2013–present)
- Sydney Kamlager, California state senator from the 30th district (2021–present)
- John Laird, California state senator from the 17th district (2020–present)
- Connie Leyva, California state senator from the 20th district (2014–present)
- Monique Limón, California state senator from the 19th district (2020–present)
- Mike McGuire, California state senator from the 2nd district (2014–present)
- Josh Newman, California state senator from the 29th district (2020–present)
- Anthony Portantino, California state senator from the 25th district (2016–present)
- Richard Roth, California state senator from the 31st district (2012–present)
- Susan Rubio, California state senator from the 22nd district (2018–present)
- Nancy Skinner, California state senator from the 9th district (2016–present)
- Henry Stern, California state senator from the 27th district (2016–present)
- Tom Umberg, California state senator from the 34th district (2018–present)
- Robert Wieckowski, California state senator from the 10th district (2014–present)
- Scott Wiener, California state senator from the 11th district (2016–present)

State assemblymembers

- Cecilia Aguiar-Curry, California state assemblymember from the 4th district (2016–present)
- Joaquin Arambula, California state assemblymember from the 31st district (2016–present)
- Marc Berman, California state assemblymember from the 24th district (2016–present)
- Richard Bloom, California state assemblymember from the 50th district (2012–present, also endorsed Marc Levine)
- Tasha Boerner Horvath, California state assemblymember from the 76th district (2018–present)
- Isaac Bryan, California state assemblymember from the 54th district (2021–present)
- Autumn Burke, California state assemblymember from the 62nd district (2014–2022)
- Lisa Calderon, California state assemblymember from the 57th district (2020–present)
- Wendy Carrillo, California state assemblymember from the 51st district (2017–present)
- Sabrina Cervantes, California state assemblymember from the 60th district (2016–present)
- Jim Cooper, California state assemblymember from the 9th district (2014–present)
- Jim Frazier, California state assemblymember from the 11th district (2012–2021)
- Laura Friedman, California state assemblymember from the 43rd district (2016–present)
- Jesse Gabriel, California state assemblymember from the 45th district (2018–present)
- Cristina Garcia, California state assemblymember from the 58th district (2012–present)
- Eduardo Garcia, California state assemblymember from the 56th district (2014–present)
- Lorena Gonzalez, California state assemblymember from the 80th district (2013–2022)
- Tim Grayson, California state assemblymember from the 14th district (2016–present)
- Chris Holden, California state assemblymember from the 41st district (2012–present)
- Jacqui Irwin, California state assemblymember from the 44th district (2014–present)
- Reggie Jones-Sawyer, California state assemblymember from the 59th district (2012–present)
- Alex Lee, California state assemblymember from the 25th district (2020–present)
- Evan Low, California state assemblymember from the 28th district (2014–present)
- Brian Maienschein, California state assemblymember from the 77th district (2012–present)
- Chad Mayes, California state assemblymember from the 42nd district (2014–present, Independent)
- Jose Medina, California state assemblymember from the 61st district (2012–present)
- Kevin Mullin, California state assemblymember from the 22nd district (2012–present)
- Al Muratsuchi, California state assemblymember from the 66th district (2014–present)
- Patrick O'Donnell, California state assemblymember from the 70th district (2014–present)
- Cottie Petrie-Norris, California state assemblymember from the 74th district (2018–present)
- ~~Bill Quirk, California state assemblymember from the 20th district (2012–present)~~ (withdrawn)
- Sharon Quirk-Silva, California state assemblymember from the 65th district (2016–present)
- Eloise Reyes, California state assemblymember from the 47th district (2016–present)
- Luz Rivas, California state assemblymember from the 39th district (2018–present)
- Robert Rivas, California state assemblymember from the 30th district (2018–present, also endorsed Marc Levine)
- Freddie Rodriguez, California state assemblymember from the 52nd district (2013–present)
- Blanca Rubio, California state assemblymember from the 48th district (2016–present)
- Miguel Santiago, California state assemblymember from the 53rd district (2014–present)
- Mark Stone, California state assemblymember from the 29th district (2012–present)
- Phil Ting, California state assemblymember from the 19th district (2012–present)
- Chris Ward, California state assemblymember from the 78th district (2020–present)

Newspapers

- La Opinión

Organizations

- California Democratic Party
- California Teachers Association
- Equality California
- Latino Victory Fund
- LGBTQ Victory Fund
- NARAL Pro-Choice California
- Service Employees International Union
- Sierra Club
- Stonewall Democrats
- United Farm Workers
Marc Levine (D)

State assemblymembers

- Richard Bloom, California state assemblymember from the 50th district (2012–present, also endorsed Ricardo Lara)
- Adrin Nazarian, California state assemblymember from the 46th district (2012–present)
- Bill Quirk, California state assemblymember from the 20th district (2012–present)
- Anthony Rendon, Speaker of the California State Assembly (2016–present)
- Robert Rivas, California state assemblymember from the 30th district (2018–present, also endorsed Ricardo Lara)

Newspapers

- Bay Area Reporter
- East Bay Times
- Los Angeles Times
- Marin Independent Journal
- The Mercury News
- San Francisco Chronicle

Organizations

- California Nurses Association/National Nurses Organizing Committee

== Primary election ==
=== Results ===
Results by county Lara: 20–30%; 30–40%; 40–50%; Howell: 20–30%; 30–40%; 40–50%; Levine: 50–60%; Conlon: 20–30%; 30–40%; 40–50%

Primary election results
Party	Candidate	Votes	%
Democratic	Ricardo Lara (incumbent)	2,414,744	35.91%
Republican	Robert Howell	1,216,322	18.09%
Democratic	Marc Levine	1,208,645	17.98%
Republican	Greg Conlon	1,086,683	16.16%
Democratic	Vinson Eugene Allen	258,040	3.83%
Peace and Freedom	Nathalie Hrizi	190,414	2.83%
Green	Veronika Fimbres	129,762	1.93%
Democratic	Jasper Jackson	124,955	1.86%
No party preference	Robert J. Molnar	94,163	1.40%
Total votes		6,723,728	100.0%

== General election ==
=== Polling ===
Poll source	Date(s) administered	Sample size (Note: Key: A – all adults RV – registered voters LV – likely voters V – unclear)	Margin of error	Ricardo Lara (D)	Robert Howell (R)	Undecided
USC	October 30 – November 2, 2022	802 (RV)	± 3.5%	62%	38%	–

=== Results ===
2022 California Insurance Commissioner election
Party	Candidate	Votes	%	±%
Democratic	Ricardo Lara (incumbent)	6,355,915	59.93%	+2.41%
Republican	Robert Howell	4,249,391	40.07%	−2.41%
Total votes		10,605,306	100.00%	N/A
Democratic hold				

==== By county ====
County	Ricardo Lara Democratic		Robert Howell Republican		Margin		Total votes cast
County	#	%	#	%	#	%	Total votes cast
Alameda	374,261	79.01%	99,427	20.99%	274,834	58.02%	473,688
Alpine	361	60.17%	239	39.83%	122	20.33%	600
Amador	6,318	34.73%	11,873	65.27%	-5,555	-30.54%	18,191
Butte	32,467	46.36%	37,561	53.64%	-5,094	-7.27%	70,028
Calaveras	7,475	35.74%	13,438	64.26%	-5,963	-28.51%	20,913
Colusa	1,773	32.60%	3,666	67.40%	-1,893	-34.80%	5,439
Contra Costa	258,218	68.41%	119,266	31.59%	138,952	36.81%	377,484
Del Norte	3,396	41.43%	4,800	58.57%	-1,404	-17.13%	8,196
El Dorado	35,609	41.25%	50,717	58.75%	-15,108	-17.50%	86,326
Fresno	100,562	47.04%	113,223	52.96%	-12,661	-5.92%	213,785
Glenn	2,182	28.07%	5,591	71.93%	-3,409	-43.86%	7,773
Humboldt	30,058	63.96%	16,939	36.04%	13,119	27.91%	46,997
Imperial	17,363	59.01%	12,062	40.99%	5,301	18.02%	29,425
Inyo	3,396	46.94%	3,838	53.06%	-442	-6.11%	7,234
Kern	73,688	39.62%	112,316	60.38%	-38,628	-20.77%	186,004
Kings	9,985	37.64%	16,542	62.36%	-6,557	-24.72%	26,527
Lake	10,064	50.89%	9,712	49.11%	352	1.78%	19,776
Lassen	1,874	20.83%	7,122	79.17%	-5,248	-58.34%	8,996
Los Angeles	1,556,724	68.48%	716,413	31.52%	840,311	36.97%	2,273,137
Madera	13,809	37.96%	22,565	62.04%	-8,756	-24.07%	36,374
Marin	90,627	79.63%	23,179	20.37%	67,448	59.27%	113,806
Mariposa	3,036	39.42%	4,666	60.58%	-1,630	-21.16%	7,702
Mendocino	19,390	65.24%	10,333	34.76%	9,057	30.47%	29,723
Merced	26,257	48.26%	28,156	51.74%	-1,899	-3.49%	54,413
Modoc	819	24.57%	2,515	75.43%	-1,696	-50.87%	3,334
Mono	2,526	56.94%	1,910	43.06%	616	13.89%	4,436
Monterey	64,656	64.71%	35,265	35.29%	29,391	29.41%	99,921
Napa	31,829	65.66%	16,646	34.34%	15,183	31.32%	48,475
Nevada	26,871	54.20%	22,711	45.80%	4,160	8.39%	49,582
Orange	465,959	48.97%	485,654	51.03%	-19,695	-2.07%	951,613
Placer	74,905	42.20%	102,605	57.80%	-27,700	-15.60%	177,510
Plumas	3,278	38.77%	5,177	61.23%	-1,899	-22.46%	8,455
Riverside	285,165	48.93%	297,663	51.07%	-12,498	-2.14%	582,828
Sacramento	271,673	58.38%	193,651	41.62%	78,022	16.77%	465,324
San Benito	10,646	55.44%	8,557	44.56%	2,089	10.88%	19,203
San Bernardino	217,865	48.78%	228,795	51.22%	-10,930	-2.45%	446,660
San Diego	566,150	56.71%	432,187	43.29%	133,963	13.42%	998,337
San Francisco	237,225	83.89%	45,567	16.11%	191,658	67.77%	282,792
San Joaquin	88,871	50.95%	85,540	49.05%	3,331	1.91%	174,411
San Luis Obispo	60,967	52.50%	55,153	47.50%	5,814	5.01%	116,120
San Mateo	176,955	74.51%	60,552	25.49%	116,403	49.01%	237,507
Santa Barbara	79,781	60.68%	51,689	39.32%	28,092	21.37%	131,470
Santa Clara	365,198	69.65%	159,164	30.35%	206,034	39.29%	524,362
Santa Cruz	77,950	76.97%	23,323	23.03%	54,627	53.94%	101,273
Shasta	20,462	30.74%	46,099	69.26%	-25,637	-38.52%	66,561
Sierra	559	36.54%	971	63.46%	-412	-26.93%	1,530
Siskiyou	6,748	38.91%	10,593	61.09%	-3,845	-22.17%	17,341
Solano	78,780	61.28%	49,785	38.72%	28,995	22.55%	128,565
Sonoma	139,153	72.35%	53,186	27.65%	85,967	44.70%	192,339
Stanislaus	57,132	44.38%	71,588	55.62%	-14,456	-11.23%	128,720
Sutter	9,644	35.13%	17,806	64.87%	-8,162	-29.73%	27,450
Tehama	5,689	28.01%	14,624	71.99%	-8,935	-43.99%	20,313
Trinity	1,995	44.85%	2,453	55.15%	-458	-10.30%	4,448
Tulare	34,879	38.65%	55,363	61.35%	-20,484	-22.70%	90,242
Tuolumne	8,774	38.47%	14,032	61.53%	-5,258	-23.06%	22,806
Ventura	152,558	55.72%	121,216	44.28%	31,342	11.45%	273,774
Yolo	44,563	67.70%	21,258	32.30%	23,305	35.41%	65,821
Yuba	6,797	35.32%	12,449	64.68%	-5,652	-29.37%	19,246
Totals	6,355,915	59.93%	4,249,391	40.07%	2,106,524	19.86%	10,605,306

Counties that flipped from Republican to Democratic

- Mono (largest city: Mammoth Lakes)
- Nevada (largest city: Truckee)
- San Diego (largest city: San Diego)
- San Luis Obispo (largest city: San Luis Obispo)

==== By congressional district ====
Lara won 41 of 52 congressional districts, including two that elected Republicans, with the remaining 11 going to Howell, including one that elected a Democrat.

District	Lara	Howell	Representative
1st	36%	64%	Doug LaMalfa
2nd	72%	28%	Jared Huffman
3rd	45%	55%	Kevin Kiley
4th	65%	35%	Mike Thompson
5th	39%	61%	Tom McClintock
6th	55%	45%	Ami Bera
7th	65%	35%	Doris Matsui
8th	75%	25%	John Garamendi
9th	50.2%	49.8%	Josh Harder
10th	65%	35%	Mark DeSaulnier
11th	85%	15%	Nancy Pelosi
12th	89%	11%	Barbara Lee
13th	48%	52%	John Duarte
14th	68%	32%	Eric Swalwell
15th	75%	25%	Jackie Speier (117th Congress)
15th	75%	25%	Kevin Mullin (118th Congress)
16th	72%	28%	Anna Eshoo
17th	70%	30%	Ro Khanna
18th	66%	34%	Zoe Lofgren
19th	66%	34%	Jimmy Panetta
20th	33%	67%	Kevin McCarthy
21st	53%	47%	Jim Costa
22nd	51%	49%	David Valadao
23rd	41%	59%	Jay Obernolte
24th	60%	40%	Salud Carbajal
25th	54%	46%	Raul Ruiz
26th	55%	45%	Julia Brownley
27th	51%	49%	Mike Garcia
28th	63%	37%	Judy Chu
29th	74%	26%	Tony Cárdenas
30th	75%	25%	Adam Schiff
31st	60%	40%	Grace Napolitano
32nd	67%	33%	Brad Sherman
33rd	56%	44%	Pete Aguilar
34th	82%	18%	Jimmy Gomez
35th	57%	43%	Norma Torres
36th	67%	33%	Ted Lieu
37th	85%	15%	Karen Bass (117th Congress)
37th	85%	15%	Sydney Kamlager-Dove (118th Congress)
38th	59%	41%	Linda Sánchez
39th	56%	44%	Mark Takano
40th	45%	55%	Young Kim
41st	46%	54%	Ken Calvert
42nd	68%	32%	Lucille Roybal-Allard (117th Congress)
42nd	68%	32%	Robert Garcia (118th Congress)
43rd	79%	21%	Maxine Waters
44th	70%	30%	Nanette Barragán
45th	49%	51%	Michelle Steel
46th	60%	40%	Lou Correa
47th	49.996%	50.004%	Katie Porter
48th	39%	61%	Darrell Issa
49th	51%	49%	Mike Levin
50th	62%	38%	Scott Peters
51st	60%	40%	Sara Jacobs
52nd	64%	36%	Juan Vargas

== See also ==
- 2022 California elections
- 2022 California gubernatorial election
