= Ricardo Lara =

American politician

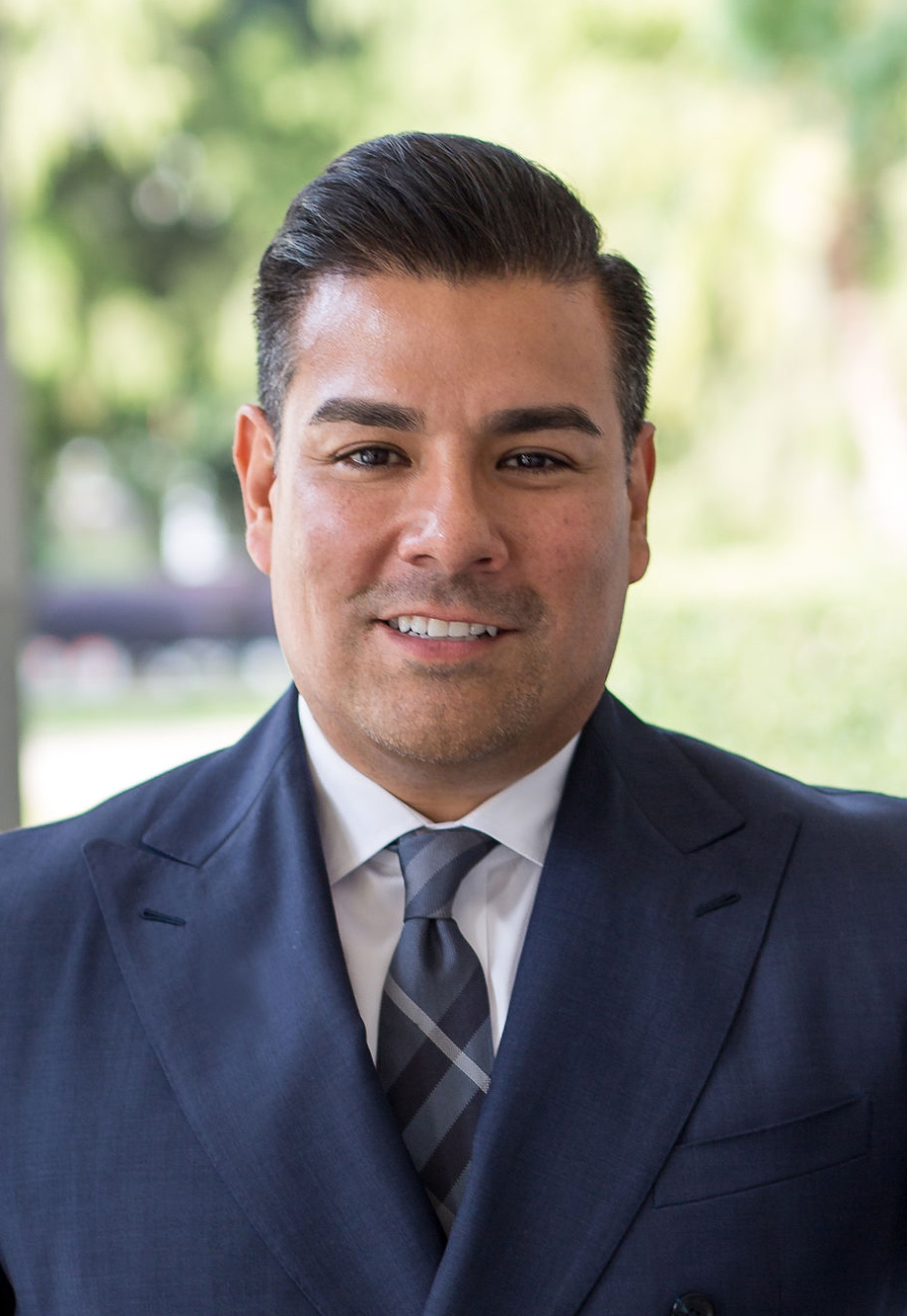
- Official portrait, 2019

8th Insurance Commissioner of California
- Incumbent
- Assumed office January 7, 2019
- Governor: Gavin Newsom
- Preceded by: Dave Jones
- Succeeded by: Jane Kim

Member of the California State Senate from the 33rd district
- In office December 3, 2012 – January 7, 2019
- Preceded by: Mimi Walters (redistricted)
- Succeeded by: Lena Gonzalez

Member of the California State Assembly from the 50th district
- In office December 6, 2010 – November 30, 2012
- Preceded by: Hector De La Torre
- Succeeded by: Richard Bloom

Personal details
- Born: November 5, 1974 (age 52) Commerce, California, U.S.
- Party: Democratic
- Education: San Diego State University (BA); University of Southern California (MA)
- Website: Government website

Ricardo Lara (born November 5, 1974) is an American politician who is currently serving as the 8th Insurance Commissioner of California. Lara was elected during the 2018 election, defeating former California insurance commissioner Steve Poizner.

Lara previously served in the California State Senate from 2012 to 2019 as a Democrat, representing the 33rd Senate district. Prior to that, he served in the California State Assembly, representing the 50th Assembly district.

== Early life and career ==
Born in Commerce, California, Lara is the son of a formerly undocumented factory worker and seamstress from Mexico. Lara attended Los Angeles Unified School District schools and graduated from San Diego State University, where he earned a Bachelor of Arts degree and served as student body president. In 2013, Lara completed Harvard University's John F. Kennedy School of Government program for Senior Executives in State and Local Government as a David Bohnett LGBTQ Victory Institute Leadership Fellow.

A longtime Assembly staffer, Lara worked as Chief of Staff to Assemblyman Marco Antonio Firebaugh (D–South Gate) when Firebaugh served as Majority Leader. Lara later served as Fabian Nuñez's district director during Nuñez's time as Speaker. He then served as communications director for Assemblyman Kevin de León (D–Los Angeles).

== In politics ==
=== 2008 State Assembly campaign ===
Lara was a candidate for the Assembly in 2008, seeking the Democratic nomination in the Los Angeles-based 46th district. He faced a number of well-connected challengers, including John Pérez, the cousin of Los Angeles mayor Antonio Villaraigosa. Following a meeting at Getty House, Villaraigosa's official residence, Pérez became the consensus candidate and the other candidates, including Lara, dropped their campaigns. Although the challengers' names remained on the ballot, Pérez won the primary comfortably and took the seat before being elected to the Speakership in late 2009.

Lara was subsequently appointed by Villaraigosa to the powerful Los Angeles Planning Commission, where he served until resigning to focus on his 2010 Assembly run in the 50th district. Running for the seat required Lara to move into the district, which at the time did not include any part of the city of Los Angeles. Because Los Angeles planning commissioners are required to be residents of the city of Los Angeles, Lara could not run for the 50th Assembly district while serving on the commission. He announced his candidacy for the seat in early 2009 and became a resident of Bell Gardens.

=== 2010 State Assembly campaign ===
Lara faced three primary challengers in his 2010 Assembly bid, two of whom had held elected office in the district. With the support of the state and local Democratic parties as well as the Los Angeles County Federation of Labor, Lara prevailed handily. He faced a Republican opponent in the general election and won overwhelmingly.

=== In the State Assembly ===
Lara was sworn in as an assemblyman on December 6, 2010, and was appointed the chairman of the joint legislative audit committee. He also served on the following committees: appropriations; banking and finance; higher education; and water, parks, and wildlife. He also chairs the select committee on financial empowerment.

To prevent another Bell scandal, Lara established the Local High Risk Audit Program with the passage of Assembly Bill 187 in 2011, allowing the California State Auditor to identify cities at high risk for waste, fraud, or mismanagement.

=== 2012 State Senate campaign ===
On October 19, 2011, Lara announced plans to run for the California Senate in the newly drawn 33rd district in 2012. The district, which has a Hispanic majority, includes many of the communities he currently represents in the Assembly as well as much of the city of Long Beach. Assemblywoman Bonnie Lowenthal (D–Long Beach), ex-wife of current senator Alan Lowenthal, had already announced her intention to run for the seat, setting off a high-profile contest between two Assembly Democrats. Lara swiftly lined up a number of endorsements, including from Congresswoman Linda Sanchez, the California Nurses Association and the California Latino Legislative Caucus, the last of which declared the race their number one target seat. An opinion poll also showed Lara favored to win the seat, giving him a 6-point lead over Lowenthal. Two weeks after Lara's entry into the race, Lowenthal dropped her bid for the Senate and announced that she would instead seek re-election to the Assembly.

Lara was reelected to the Senate in 2016 with 78.6% of the vote.

=== In the State Senate ===
Lara has passed legislation for cleaner air, to expand healthcare, and to protect the civil rights of Californians. He was author of the Super Pollutant Reduction Act (Senate Bill 1383) in 2016, which created the nation's toughest law on black carbon, methane, and fluorocarbons that contribute to global warming. Lara wrote Senate Bill 4, Health for All Kids, which became the basis for 2015 budget action that led to healthcare for nearly 200,000 undocumented immigrant children under California's Medi-Cal program.

In the 2017 legislative session, Lara introduced the Healthy California Act (Senate Bill 562) with Senator Toni Atkins to create a single-payer healthcare plan that replaces private insurance with a publicly run plan that covers all Californians, including an estimated 2.7 million uninsured and as many as one-third of Californians who are underinsured. He is also joint author with Senator Holly Mitchell of a package of bills to reform criminal justice and juvenile justice laws by requiring minors consult with an attorney on a Miranda warning, ensure children under age 12 are not subject to juvenile court and seal arrest records for those never convicted of a crime.

Lara has also passed bills to create cleaning product chemical disclosure, prevent California law enforcement from participating in the creation of a registry based on religion, ethnicity or national origin, and protecting the privacy of hotel guests and bus passengers.

In the 2017-18 legislative session, Governor Brown signed 34 laws principally authored by Lara, the most of any senator. These laws included protections for wildfire victims against losing their home insurance to cancellation or nonrenewal, the decriminalization of sidewalk vending, and the nation's first climate insurance law.

=== Insurance Commissioner ===
On March 21, 2017, Lara announced he was running for California Insurance Commissioner in 2018.

"I'm running to be California's next state insurance commissioner because I believe at my core that California needs a strong defender, and a counterpuncher, who will stand up to fight our bullying President, Donald Trump, and his increasingly reckless federal government on issues from healthcare access to economic security and more,” Lara said in a statement.

On November 6, 2018, Lara narrowly led former Republican Insurance Commissioner Steve Poizner, who ran as an independent. Lara increased his lead substantially in the coming days until AP called the race for Lara on November 16, 2018.

After the election, Lara faced significant criticism in which he admitted to receiving donations from the insurance industry he regulates despite pledging not to do so during his campaign.

Since assuming office in 2019, Lara has missed nearly all key Senate Insurance Committee hearings, few of which were held each year, often due to international and cross-country travel. Public records revealed at least 46 such trips, including a minimum of 11 taxpayer-funded international excursions to destinations like Bogotá, Paris, Bermuda, Toronto, and the United Kingdom. In many cases, the Department of Insurance has been unable to provide clear documentation of the business purpose of these trips. Critics, including a former department travel policy specialist, have raised concerns about whether these travels truly served mission-critical objectives as claimed, while the department has defended the trips as efforts to engage with global reinsurers and protect California’s insurance market.

=== Electoral history ===
Year	Office	Party	Primary			General				Result	Swing	Ref.
Year	Office	Party	Total	%	P.	Total	%	±%	P.	Result	Swing	Ref.
2008	State Assemblymember	Democratic	1,326	14.58%	4th					Lost		
2010	State Assemblymember	Democratic	6,314	42.69%	1st	46,676	77.63%	-22.37%	1st	Won	Hold	
2012	State Senator	Democratic	35,865	99.99%	1st	158,707	80.41%	+38.51%	1st	Won	Flip	
2016	State Senator	Democratic	104,027	99.95%	1st	177,971	78.65%	-1.76%	1st	Won	Hold	
2018	Insurance Commissioner	Democratic	2,538,478	40.49%	2nd	6,186,039	52.87%	-4.65%	1st	Won	Hold	
2022	Insurance Commissioner	Democratic	2,414,744	34.91%	1st	6,355,910	59.93%	+7.06%	1st	Won	Hold	

== Notable awards ==
He was inducted into the LGBTQ+ Victory Institute’s LGBTQ+ Political Hall of Fame in 2025.

== Personal life ==
He is openly gay.

Political offices
Preceded by Dave Jones	Insurance Commissioner of California; 2019–present	Incumbent
