= California's 50th district =

California's 50th district may refer to:

- California's 50th congressional district
- California's 50th State Assembly district
