= Kimi Yoshino =

American journalist

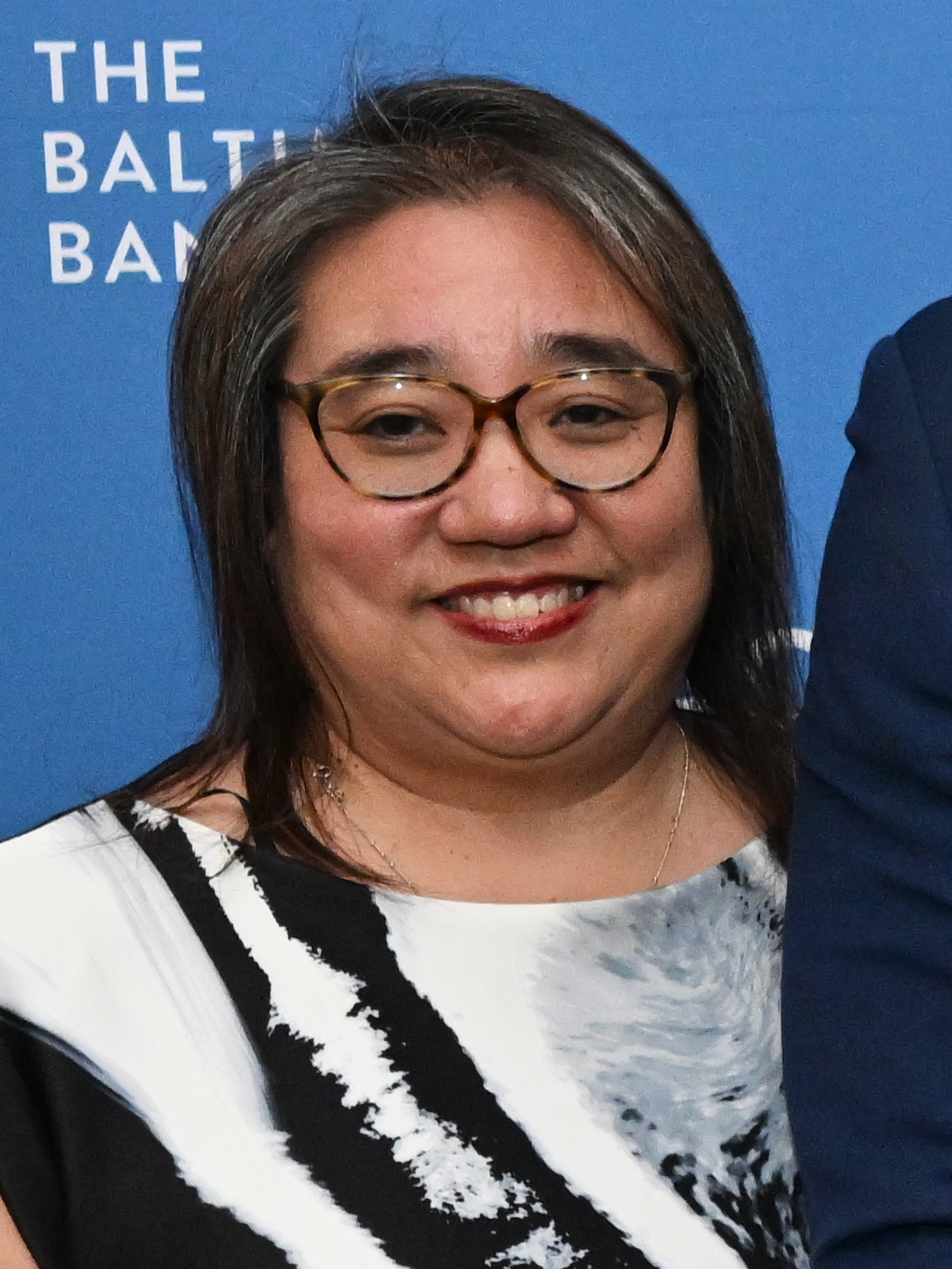
Yoshino in October 2024

Kimi Yoshino is an American journalist and managing editor of The Washington Post. She was the founding editor-in-chief of The Baltimore Banner, a nonprofit publication funded by Baltimore-area hotel magnate Stewart W. Bainum Jr.

== Biography ==
Yoshino worked at the Stockton Record and the Fresno Bee before joining the Los Angeles Times in 2000. She helped develop the publication's most popular blog, L.A. Now. Yoshino reported on unethical practices at a fertility clinic in the University of California Irvine, and on dangerous rides at Disneyland. Yoshino was the guiding editor of an investigative story about the Bell corruption scandal that won a Pulitzer Gold Medal in 2011 for Public Service. She met her husband, a translator, while working in Iraq. She became the chief editor of Business and Finance for the L.A. Times in 2014. In 2015 and 2016, Yoshino received awards from the Society of American Business Editors and Writers for general excellence.

In January 2018, Yoshino was unexpectedly approached by chief editor Lewis D’Vorkin while in a meeting, and escorted directly outside without being able to retrieve her personal belongings. There was no explanation to the press or others in the company. It has been speculated by fellow staff members that D’Vorkin believed Yoshino had leaked unflattering audio recordings of D'Vorkin in meetings to The New York Times and NPR, and possibly that Yoshino had been involved in a scathing piece on D'Vorkin published in the Columbia Journalism Review the day before her firing. It's also suspected the suspension may have been the result of a critical story about Disneyland which had been edited by Yoshino and caused public relations problems for D'Vorkin.

She has also contributed to the Seattle Times, Nieman Lab, the Boston Herald, the Stockton Record and the Fresno Bee.

As editor of the Banner, Yoshino built the largest newsroom in Maryland and oversaw a series of stories on Baltimore's overdose crisis that won a George Polk Award and Pulitzer Prize. In May 2025, she departed to become managing editor of The Washington Post, overseeing features, sports, local, investigations and data.
