= The Baltimore Banner =

American newspaper

- Type: Online newspaper
- Publisher: The Venetoulis Institute for Local Journalism (2022–present)
- Editor-in-chief: Audrey Cooper
- CEO: Bob Cohn
- Language: English
- Headquarters: 621 East Pratt Street
- City: Baltimore, Maryland
- Country: United States
- Website: thebanner.com

The Baltimore Banner, also known as The Banner, is a news website in Baltimore founded by the Venetoulis Institute for Local Journalism, which is a nonprofit set up by Stewart W. Bainum Jr. It launched June 14, 2022. It had a staff of 125, with about 80 working the newsroom, as of March 2024. The newspaper had 55,000 subscribers by the end of 2024, and brought in $13 million in revenue with 45% from subscriptions, 35% from advertising and 22% from philanthropy.

The Banner won the 2025 Pulitzer Prize for Local Reporting in recognition of its coverage of drug overdoses. It was a finalist for the 2026 Pulitzer Prize for Local Reporting for its coverage of unreliable public transit that made it nearly impossible for Baltimore students to get to school on time.

== History ==
Bainum stated The Baltimore Banner takes its name from the Star-Spangled Banner flag that waved over Fort McHenry in 1814 during the War of 1812 and gave its name to the American national anthem. Others have cited other inspiration.

After Alden Global Capital refused an offer from Bainum to buy The Baltimore Sun as part of their 2021 acquisition of Tribune Publishing, Bainum backed an all-digital, nonprofit competitor to be named The Baltimore Banner in 2022, owned by The Venetoulis Institute for Local Journalism. It launched with 42 journalists and planned to expand to 70 by the end of the year. Bainum cited his experience from the Maryland State Legislature in the 1970s, when "he marveled at the reporters’ ability to sort the honest politicians from the 'political whores' by exposing abuses of power." "Mr. Bainum’s goal... is to build the largest newsroom in Maryland — more than 100 journalists," reported The New York Times.

On October 27, 2021, The Venetoulis Institute announced the hiring of former Los Angeles Times managing editor Kimi Yoshino as the Banner's editor-in-chief. The next day, The Institute announced the hiring of Klas Uden as Chief Marketing Officer, Shameel Arafin as Chief Product Officer, Early Cokley as Head of Technology, and Andre Jones as Head of People, Culture and Diversity. In December 2021, the Venetoulis Institute has hired former Wall Street Journal and Dow Jones executive Imtiaz Patel as chief executive officer. On December 19, 2023, the news organization announced that Bob Cohn, former President of The Economist magazine, had been named Chief Executive Officer, replacing Patel, who left in July 2023.

The Banner has hired several current and former Sun reporters, including crime reporter Justin Fenton, education reporter Liz Bowie, enterprise reporter Tim Prudente, and statehouse reporter Pam Wood. The Banner has also set up a “Creatives in Residence” program to "feature the work of Baltimore-area artists and writers." At launch, this group included D. Watkins, Kondwani Fidel, Kerry Graham, and Mikea Hugley.

Shortly before its launch, the Banner struck a partnership with WYPR, an NPR affiliate. The outlets pledged to share content and work together to cover stories and develop joint programming. In August 2022, the station announced a partnership with WJZ-TV, a CBS-owned and operated station. The two outlets share online content and Banner journalists appear on the station's 9 a.m. newscasts.

The Baltimore Banner bolstered its school sports coverage with its August 2022 acquisition of Varsity Sports Network.

In March 2024, the Banner announced plans to expand its editorial coverage from the city into Baltimore County, and from there to Anne Arundel County and Howard County.

In February 2025, the Banner won a Polk Award for its coverage of Baltimore's drug overdose crisis. Reporters Alissa Zhu and Nick Thieme, and photojournalist Jessica Gallagher later won a Pulitzer in local reporting, shared with the New York Times, for the same series of stories.

In May 2025, Yoshino departed the Banner to become a managing editor at The Washington Post. Brian McGrory, former editor-in-chief of The Boston Globe, chair of the journalism department at Boston University and a board member for the Banner's parent organization, will serve as interim editor while a nationwide search is conducted for Yoshino's successor. On September 25, 2025, Audrey Cooper, the editor in chief of WNYC, was named as the Banner's new editor in chief.

In September 2025, the Banner expanded into Montgomery County, Maryland, launching content specific to the county under the name The Banner and publishing on a new web domain. The new bureau, led by Zuri Berry, aims to fill a perceived lack of news coverage in the Washington, D.C. suburbs. The Banner partnered with NBC-owned station WRC-TV and its Telemundo sister station WZDC-CD in a manner similar to its existing partnership with WJZ. In February 2026, following massive staff cuts at The Washington Post, the Banner announced that it would expand into Prince George's County, Maryland, and expand its sports coverage to include Washington, D.C. teams, including the Washington Nationals and Washington Commanders.

In April 2026, The Venetoulis Institute announced that it would buy the Pittsburgh Post-Gazette and associated assets to prevent it from shutting down. Bainum Jr. also announced a further investment of $30 million dedicated to expanding the Banner and to "turning around" the Post-Gazette.

== See also ==
- Institute for Nonprofit News (member)
- List of newspapers in Maryland
