= Audrey Cooper =

American journalist

- Cooper in 2026
- Born: 1977 (age 48–49); Topeka, Kansas, U.S.
- Education: Boston University (BA)
- Occupation: Journalist
- Known for: First woman editor-in-chief of the San Francisco Chronicle

Audrey Cooper (born c. 1977) is an American journalist and news executive. She is the editor in chief of The Baltimore Banner, a position she began in October 2025. Cooper was previously the editor in chief of the San Francisco Chronicle from 2015 to 2020, where she was the first woman to hold the position in the newspaper's 150-year history. She later served as senior vice president of news and editor in chief of WNYC in New York City from 2020 to 2025.

== Early life and education ==
Cooper was born c. 1977 in Topeka, Kansas. She was raised outside Kansas City, Kansas. Cooper attended Boston University, graduating magna cum laude in 1999 with a B.S. in journalism and a B.A. in political science. While in college, she became a public radio devotee and volunteered to answer phones during pledge drives at a local station, an experience she says inspired her to become a journalist.

== Career ==
Cooper began her journalism career as a reporter for the Associated Press on the West Coast. She also worked for the Tri-Valley Herald and the Stockton Record. She eventually became the metro editor for The Record in Stockton, California. Early in her career, Cooper applied for an internship at the San Francisco Chronicle for three consecutive years but said she "never even got a callback."

=== San Francisco Chronicle ===
In 2006, Cooper joined the staff of the San Francisco Chronicle as an assistant metro editor. She rose through the ranks, being named metro editor in 2009, assistant managing editor in 2011, and deputy managing editor in 2012. She led a project on homelessness and a series called "Vanishing Violence" that examined racial inequities in the justice system. In May 2013, at age 35, she was appointed managing editor, the first woman to hold that position in the paper's 148-year history.

After serving as acting editor since May 2014, Cooper was named editor in chief on January 13, 2015. At 37, she was the first woman to lead the paper in its 150-year history and the youngest woman to run a major American metropolitan newsroom. During her five-year tenure, she was credited with launching an investigative team, strengthening the paper's metro reporting, and increasing its focus on digital and breaking news. The newspaper's paid digital readership grew sixfold. Under her leadership, the Chronicle was named the best large newspaper in California for four consecutive years by the California News Publishers Association. The paper also won a Scripps Howard Award for its coverage of the 2017 Wine Country fires, an Online News Association award for its reporting on the reporting on the Camp Fire, and two Emmy Awards for its documentary "Last Men Standing." Cooper also worked to increase staff diversity. In one two-year period, 41 of the 46 journalists she hired were women, people of color, and/or identified as LGBTQ+. However, some who worked with her at the paper described her as "vindictive, mercurial, and difficult to work for." At the San Francisco Chronicle, Cooper hosted the paper's flagship podcast and held weekly newsroom tours for subscribers.

Cooper announced she was leaving the Chronicle on June 1, 2020, with her final day on June 19.

=== WNYC ===
On July 20, 2020, Cooper joined WNYC, New York's public radio station, as editor in chief and senior vice president of news. Her appointment was met with "great consternation" by many staff members, who felt their leadership had ignored their request for a person of color with experience in New York and public radio. Her primary charge was to integrate the station's radio newsroom with that of Gothamist, a nonprofit news site WNYC had acquired. Upon being hired at WNYC, she stated her first priority was to hire more people of color to address the lack of Black and brown people in the newsroom.

Cooper's tenure was marked by internal turmoil. In an early staff meeting, she remarked that she had a record of firing white men at the Chronicle, which some staff found "horrifying." In February 2021, she fired Fred Mogul, a reporter of 18 years, for plagiarism after he used credited Associated Press copy in a web story. The decision was met with backlash from the newsroom, where reporters stated the practice had been common, and over 60 employees signed a letter asking for Mogul's reinstatement.

In April 2021, WNYC laid off 14 employees, including a union shop steward and another staffer who had publicly criticized Cooper's hiring. The following month, the station's union, SAG-AFTRA, filed an unfair labor practice charge with the National Labor Relations Board, accusing Cooper and management of a "coordinated and aggressive campaign to undermine union and protected concerted activity," including retaliatory firings and surveillance of union members. SAG-AFTRA asked for New York Public Radio's board of directors to begin an independent investigation into Cooper's actions at WNYC. The legal disputes were settled in February 2022. During her time at WNYC, at least five newsroom employees were fired or laid off, and at least eighteen others resigned. Despite the internal conflict, Cooper's leadership saw WNYC become a finalist for the Pulitzer Prize for the first time, and she increased the diversity of the staff.

=== The Baltimore Banner ===
Cooper was named the next editor in chief of The Baltimore Banner, a nonprofit news organization, with a start date of October 13, 2025.

== Personal life ==
As of 2015, Cooper was married and had a son who was two years old. While living in San Francisco, she rode a brightly colored Vespa and volunteered as a guide for walking tours of neighborhoods like the Haight-Ashbury and North Beach. When she moved to New York for her position at WNYC, she purchased a brownstone in Park Slope, Brooklyn. As of 2022, she is a registered Democrat in New York. Cooper and her family planned to move to Baltimore by the end of 2025.
