= California Ecosystems Protection Act =

California Proposition passed in 1990

California State Legislature
- Introduced: early 2019
- Assembly voted: 2019
- Senate voted: 2020
- Signed into law: September 29, 2020
- Sponsor(s): Richard Bloom; Animal Legal Defense Fund; Center for Biological Diversity; Raptors Are The Solution
- Governor: Gavin Newsom
- Bill: AB 1788
- Website: Bill text Fact sheet

Status: Current legislation

California Ecosystems Protection Act, also known as Assembly Bill 1788 and AB 1788, is a law in the state of California that prohibits most uses of second-generation anticoagulant rodenticides statewide and the use of first generation anticoagulant rodenticides on state-owned land. It is meant to protect wildlife within the state.

== Background ==
Second generation anticoagulant rodenticides are single-dose rodenticides that prevent blood clotting, resulting in uncontrollable bleeding that leads to death. They are meant for rodents; however, due to their high dosage (their half-life is more than 100 days), secondary poisoning can result in wildlife that consume poisoned rodents. This secondary poisoning, known as biomagnification, affects numerous animals within California, including mountain lions, bobcats, hawks and endangered species such as Pacific fishers, spotted owls, and San Joaquin kit foxes. Prior to AB 1788's passage in 2020, more than 70% of wildlife across more than 25 species that were tested for rodenticides tested positive, including 80–90% of predators. Between 2002 and 2022, 28 of 29 mountain lions tested for anticoagulant rodenticides tested positive, including seven fatal cases.

== History ==
Second generation anticoagulant rodenticides were developed in the 1970s. Consumer sales were banned in 2014; commercial sales, however, were not. AB 1788 was introduced by State Assemblyman Richard Bloom and cosponsored by the Animal Legal Defense Fund, Center for Biological Diversity, and Raptors Are The Solution in early 2019. The bill was supported by more than twenty animal welfare and environmental protection organizations.

The bill passed five committee hearings in 2019 and one in 2020. It also passed the California State Assembly 53–17 in 2019 and the Senate 23–7 in 2020. It was signed into law as the California Ecosystems Protection Act on September 29, 2020; it went into effect on January 1, 2021.

== Effect ==
The California Ecosystems Protection Act prohibits the use of second generation anticoagulant rodenticides except for agricultural use or by special permit. It also prohibits the use of first generation anticoagulant rodenticides on state-owned land.
