= Robert Garcia (California assemblymember) =

American politician

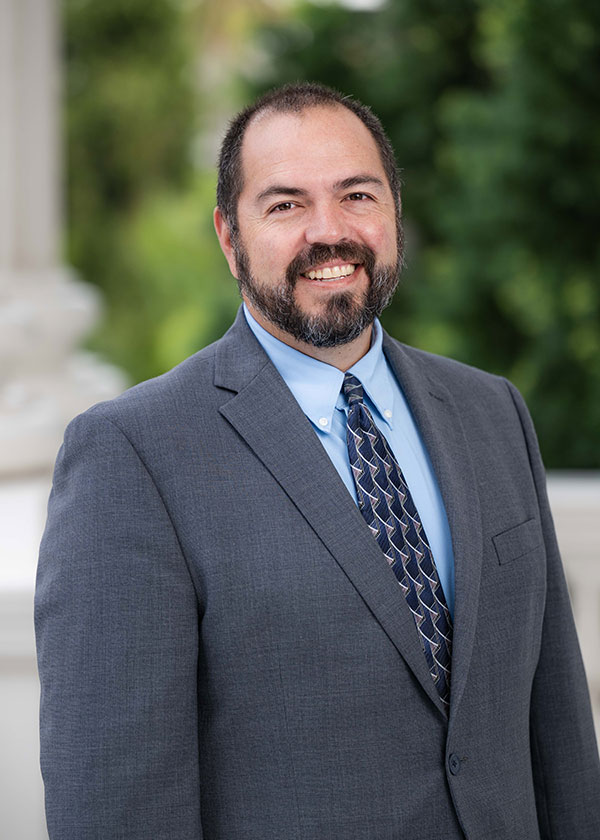
- Official portrait, 2024

Member of the California State Assembly from the 50th district
- Incumbent
- Assumed office December 2, 2024
- Preceded by: Eloise Reyes

Personal details
- Party: Democratic
- Education: University of California, Los Angeles; University of Southern California

Robert Garcia is an American politician serving in the California State Assembly from the 50th district since December 2, 2024. Prior to his election to the State Assembly, he was a trustee of the Etiwanda School Board from 2016 until 2024.

== Political career ==
In 2014, Garcia ran for the Etiwanda School District Board of Trustees, challenging its three incumbents, but did not win the election. Two years later, in 2016, two of the five seats on the board were up for election. Garcia ran again, this time against incumbents David Long and Cathline Fort. In the election, he secured second place, defeating Fort, while Long retained his seat.

In 2024, Eloise Reyes announced her candidacy for the California State Senate, creating an open seat in the Assembly. Garcia declared his run to succeed her and received endorsements from Reyes and several other elected officials. In the primary election, Garcia placed first, with Fontana School Board Trustee Adam Perez, a fellow Democrat, securing a distant second. In the general election, Garcia faced Perez in a contest between two Democrats. Garcia campaigned with the backing of the California Democratic Party and high-profile endorsements, including actress and activist Jane Fonda. He won against Perez in the general election.

== Electoral history ==
=== Etiwanda School Board ===
2014 Etiwanda School Board election
Candidate	Votes	%
Cecilia Solorio	6,042	22.5
Mondi M. Taylor	5,460	20.4
Brynna Cadman	5,335	19.9
Robert Garcia	3,878	14.5
Chad J. Evans	3,756	14.0
Taline Georgiou	2,328	8.7
Total votes	26,799	100.0

2016 Etiwanda School Board election
Candidate	Votes	%
David W. Long	12,246	25.5
Robert Garcia	11,060	23.0
Sam Sager	10,426	21.7
Cathline Fort	9,237	19.2
Taline Georgiou	5,023	10.5
Total votes	47,992	100.0

2020 Etiwanda School Board 5th district election
Candidate	Votes	%
Robert Garcia (incumbent)	6,349	68.3
William James Smith Jr.	2,948	31.7
Total votes	9,297	100.0

=== California State Assembly ===
2024 California State Assembly 50th district election
Primary election
Party	Candidate	Votes	%
Democratic	Robert Garcia	18,176	42.0
Democratic	Adam Perez	12,557	29.0
Democratic	DeJonae Shaw	12,194	28.1
Republican	Sharon Stein (write-in)	397	0.9
Total votes		43,324	100.0
General election
Democratic	Robert Garcia	77,923	56.4
Democratic	Adam Perez	60,360	43.6
Total votes		138,283	100.0
Democratic hold			
