= Curtis R. Tucker, Sr. =

American politician (1918–1988)

Curtis R. Tucker
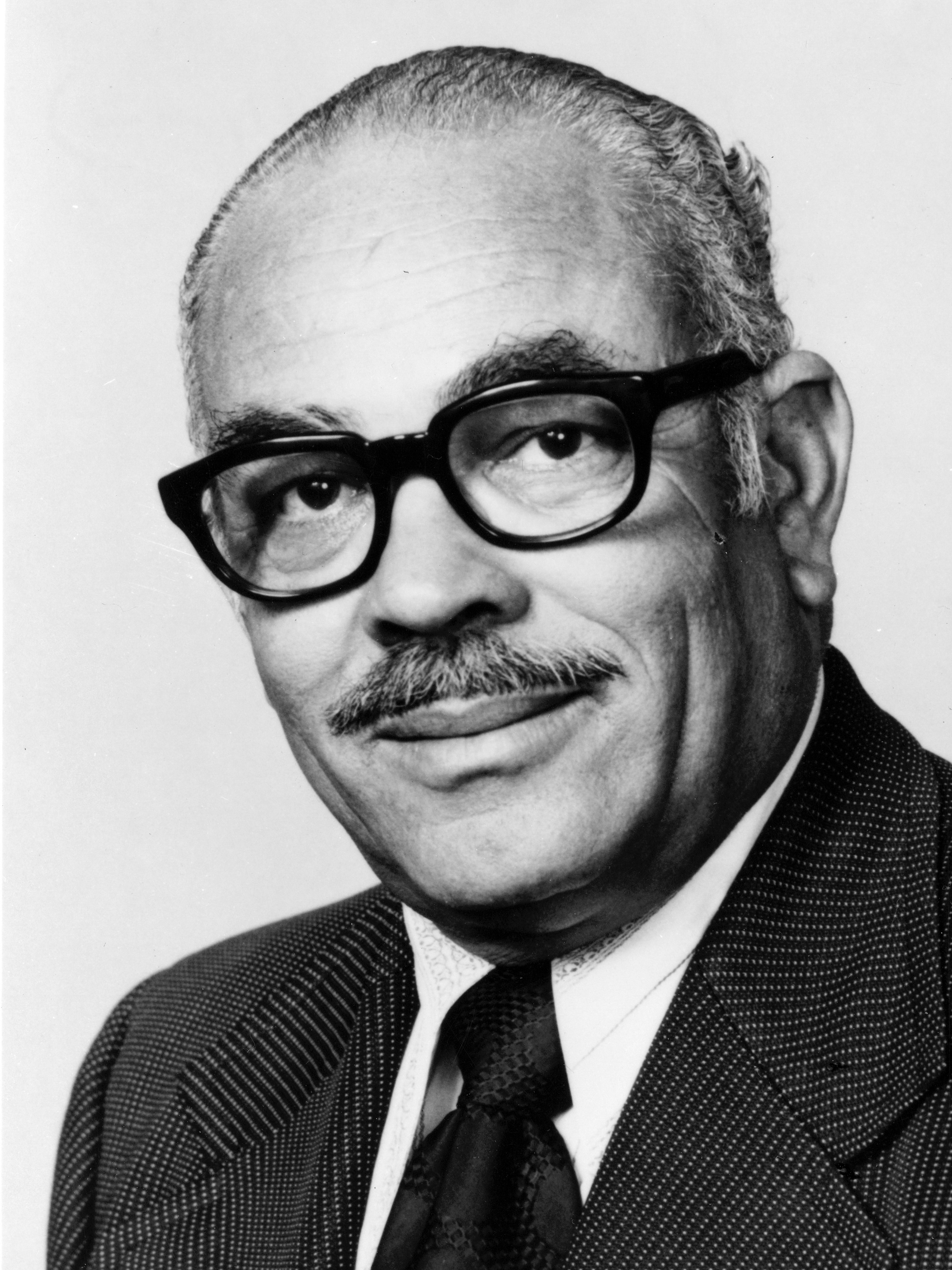
- Official portrait, 1975

Member of the California State Assembly from the 50th district
- In office December 2, 1974 – October 10, 1988
- Preceded by: Joseph B. Montoya
- Succeeded by: Curtis R. Tucker, Jr.

Personal details
- Born: March 26, 1918 Union, Louisiana
- Died: October 10, 1988 (aged 70)
- Party: Democratic
- Spouse: Lorraine Ann Hohl
- Children: 4 including Curtis R. Tucker, Jr.

Military service
- Branch/service: United States Army
- Battles/wars: World War II; Korean War

Curtis R. Tucker Sr. (March 26, 1918 – October 10, 1988) was an American politician in California. A Democrat, he served in the California State Assembly for the 50th district from 1974 until his death in 1988. He was succeeded in the Assembly by his son, Curtis R. Tucker, Jr.

== Early life ==
Tucker was born on March 26, 1918, in Union, Louisiana. During World War II he served in the United States Army as a member of the Medical Corps. During his time in the military, he studied at the University of Florence in Italy. Tucker would serve during the Korean War and later became an instructor at West Point. After 23 years in the military, Tucker joined the Los Angeles Health Department.

== Political career ==
In 1972, Tucker became the first black person elected to the Inglewood City Council, leading to re-election in 1973 with 66% of the vote.

In 1974, Tucker was elected to the California State Assembly, where he would serve until his death in 1988. During his time in the Assembly, Tucker was involved in health policy as well as racial equality issues. Tucker served as chairman of the Assembly Health Committee. On issues of race, Tucker worked to promote racial and gender equality, and justice for poor and under-represented communities. Tucker served as a member of the Legislative Black Caucus. One of Tucker's key achievements during his time in office was his work with fellow Assembly member and future Congresswoman Maxine Waters to divest and outlaw investment in Apartheid South Africa.

== Legacy ==
Tucker died of complications from liver cancer on October 10, 1988, at Daniel Freeman Memorial Hospital. He was seeking re-election at the time, and ballots had already been printed with his name, so then-Governor George Deukmejian scheduled a special election to fill Tucker's seat. Tucker's son Curtis Jr. won the seat in the special election and served in the Assembly until 1996.

Constituents referred to Tucker as "the Godfather" or the "elder statesman" of the district, due to his long tenure in the Assembly.

Because of Tucker's work on health-related issues, the Curtis R. Tucker Health Center in Inglewood was named in his honor.
