= City of Bell scandal =

Financial fraud scandal in Bell, California, United States

The Bell scandal involved the misappropriation of public funds in Bell, California, United States, over a period of several years in the late 2000s. In July 2010, the Los Angeles Times published an investigative article on possible malfeasance in the neighboring city of Maywood, revealing that the city officials of Bell received salaries that were reported as the highest in the nation. Subsequent investigations found atypically high property tax rates, allegations of voter fraud in municipal elections and other irregularities which heightened the ensuing scandal. These and other reports led to widespread criticism and a demand for city officials to resign.

On August 10, 2010, Standard & Poor's lowered Bell's general obligation and pension bond ratings to BB, two notches below investment grade, and placed the ratings on a watchlist for potential further downgrade. S&P credit analyst Michael Taylor said, "We believe that the recent resignation of the city manager and finance director, and reports that the assets purchased with the unrated series 2007 lease-secured debt have decreased in value, have created uncertainty as to the city's future actions."

Eventually, seven Bell city officials, including former mayor Oscar Hernandez, former city administrator Robert Rizzo, assistant city administrator Angela Spaccia, and four city council members were convicted on graft and corruption charges, and were given sentences ranging from probation to twelve years in prison.

Rizzo was sentenced to twelve years' imprisonment for his role in Bell and to 33 months' imprisonment in a separate income tax evasion case. Spaccia was sentenced to eleven years and eight months' imprisonment. Both were also ordered to repay millions of dollars in restitution.

Spaccia was resentenced in October 2017 after an appeals court reversed all five counts of misappropriating funds from the city. Judge Ronald S. Coen handed down a new sentence of ten years on the remaining charges of which she was convicted and the amount of money she was ordered to repay in restitution remained the same, which her lawyers planned to appeal, "contending that she was being told to repay money related to crimes which she no longer stands convicted of."

== Community ==
Bell, California, is a small suburb of Los Angeles that covers 2.5 square miles (6.5 km^{2}), with a population of approximately 38,000. It is one of the poorer cities in Los Angeles County, with almost one-sixth of residents living below the poverty line. In 2009, Bell's per capita income was about $24,800 and 90% of its residents were Hispanic or Latino. In 2010, only 43.3% held a high school degree or equivalent, and just 6.0% held a post-secondary degree. Small businesses, such as auto shops, markets, butcher shops, and bakeries dominated Bell's streets. The city's unemployment rate at the time was 16%. Bell's local elections are officially nonpartisan.

=== Charter votes and irregularities ===
In 2005, a measure approved by Bell voters exempted the city from a state law enacted earlier that year which limited the salary of council members of general-law cities—cities without a charter of their own. All five members of the Bell City Council signed a statement in favor of the "little-noticed city ballot measure", which converted Bell into a charter city and was "billed as one that would give the city more control," yet failed to mention that Bell became exempted from the salary regulations. The measure passed, 336 votes in favor and 54 against.

The salaries and pensions scandal in Bell also brought into question the issue of voter fraud. In the 2005 election, fewer than 400 votes were cast to clear the way for the aforementioned legislation allowing city officials to dramatically boost their own salaries. In that election, more than half the votes cast were absentee ballots, the most vulnerable method to manipulate fraudulent votes.

One resident of Bell, on condition of anonymity, told the Los Angeles Times that he was assigned the chore of retrieving absentee ballots: "Our objective was to collect absentee ballots, and if they were not filled out, instruct them how to fill it out, and if not, fill it out for them", he said. It is estimated that less than 1% of registered voters actually showed up to cast their ballot. It has been reported that some residents went to the polling place, only to find that their votes had already been cast.

=== Voter fraud led to scandal ===
Assertions about discrepancies in the 2009 election were also examined by the FBI and California's Secretary of State. A source at the FBI confirmed that they were aware of the accusations. In the police report were listed the names of 19 voters who allegedly were either living in Lebanon, or were deceased at the time that their votes were cast.

As L.A. prosecutors investigated potential voter fraud, several citizens allegedly told the Times that city officials encouraged them to fill out absentee ballots in a manner that election experts said has significantly raised the possibility that state law had been violated.

"Under state law, this is not to be done unless someone is ill or disabled. If, in fact, the election itself has been tainted by improper electioneering or other violations of state law, then that involves civil—maybe even criminal—penalties, and in some circumstances, you can overturn the election itself", Attorney General Jerry Brown said. "If (officials) met in a back room and said, 'How can we run an election where nobody shows up so we can then fatten our own salaries and pensions...that could constitute a violation that would bring into question the entire election."

== Scandal ==
A series of investigative articles published by the Times in July 2010 revealed that several city officials in Bell were being paid salaries significantly higher than those in other cities. The two main reporters involved in the investigations were Ruben Vives and Jeff Gottlieb, and Kimi Yoshino was the guiding editor.

In a press release issued through the Bell City Clerk's office, Mayor Oscar Hernandez claimed that "salaries of the City Manager and other top city staff have been in line with similar positions over the period of their tenure. He then accused the Times of having a "skewed view of the facts." Hernandez later apologized for what he called the city's "indefensible administrative salaries". He was later recalled, arrested, and indicted for fraud and other charges.

Bell City Council members later voted to reduce their pay to that of what one councilman, Lorenzo Velez, was being paid: $8,076 a year. Prior to that meeting, all of the other council members were making at least ten times that figure. State Controller John Chiang said that the salaries in Bell had been "outrageous and unjustifiable" and a voter fraud hotline was set up.

Documents released to the Times revealed that the California Public Employees' Retirement System (CalPERS) knew four years previously that city administrator Robert Rizzo had received a 47% pay increase to $442,000. Then-California Attorney General Jerry Brown maintained that such a large increase should have aroused suspicion from CalPERS. "These outrageous salaries in Bell are shocking and beyond belief," said Brown. "With record deficits and painful budget cuts facing California cities, astronomical local government salaries raise serious questions and demand a thorough investigation."

The California legislature's law-making season ended in August 2010. The bill (AB1955) that would have strictly regulated elected officials' income levels died while in the California State Senate. All the related bills were vetoed by Governor Arnold Schwarzenegger. Legislation that had passed before the legislature's deadline, AB1987, would have put an end to the public employee practice of pension "spiking"—the accumulation of vacation and sick time until the end of their tenure so their retirement benefit is increased, sometimes by tens of thousands of dollars per year; this bill was also vetoed by Governor Schwarzenegger.

"Frankly, Bell residents need to know if their city is solvent", said Supervisor Gloria Molina, who chairs the board and whose district includes Bell. Molina said the audit, expected to cost about $100,000, was paid for out of her office's discretionary fund, at no cost to the city.

Marcia Fritz, who heads the California Foundation for Fiscal Responsibility stated that at age 62, when Rizzo could have begun receiving Social Security payments, his annual pension and benefits would have risen to $976,771, topping $1 million two years later. "This guy would be our first seven-figure retiree", said Fritz. The million-dollar pension Rizzo was expecting has been reduced to about $100,000 per year. The other seven city council members arrested for misappropriating funds received similar pension cuts.

Governor Brown proceeded to sue, and a week later Rizzo and six of the other seven people named in his suit were charged in criminal court with plundering $5.5 million from Bell. More secreted funds containing millions of dollars were discovered in April 2011. Judge Ralph W. Dau ruled that the parts of the lawsuit accusing Rizzo and the others of "conflict of interest, squandering public funds and putting their own interests ahead of Bell's" could move forward. When Brown announced the lawsuit, he said he hoped to recoup hundreds of thousands of dollars for residents. He acknowledged it was a "novel legal approach" but said he was "confident his office had the authority."

The city of Bell had a difficult time restoring some semblance of normality in the year following the salary scandal. Residents voted in a completely new city council, and Bell's interim city manager stabilized the shaky financial position by implementing a balanced budget that eliminated several high-ranking administrative and police positions, uses federal grant money to pay some police officers' salaries, and makes other cuts. On August 12, 2011, the city announced that Arne Croce would serve as yet another interim city manager. He started at a weekly salary of $3,230 with no medical or retirement benefits, replacing interim city manager Kenneth Hampian.

As Governor, Jerry Brown made it more difficult for city council members to dishonestly pad their paychecks. Brown signed into law Assemblyman Cameron Smyth (R-Santa Clarita)'s legislation, AB 23, which requires city officials to publicize when they are holding concurrent or consecutive meetings, and how much the meeting attendees will receive in salaries. "The intent is to discourage the potential abuses by making public how much officials are being paid," Smyth said.

== BASTA ==
The primary group organized to fight the city's corruption was the Bell Association to Stop the Abuse (BASTA) ("Basta" means "enough" in Spanish.)

BASTA organized a march on July 25, 2010. Some of the marchers wore T-shirts with the words "My city is more corrupt than your city". BASTA was supported in part by the Bell Police Officers Association. The Police Officers Association has opposed the contracting of services of the Police Department, and consolidation of police services into a joint powers authority, and criticized the posting of salaries on the Bell City Clerk's website, calling them "deceptive" due to the inclusion of overtime.

BASTA collected enough signatures to force a recall election for the four City Council members facing corruption charges. The recall was scheduled in March 2011. Organizers with BASTA began the recall process during the previous August after unsuccessfully calling for the resignation of Mayor Oscar Hernandez and council members Luis Artiga, Teresa Jacobo, and George Mirabal.

== Special recall election 2011 ==
A special recall election was held on March 8, 2011, which was consolidated with the regularly scheduled municipal election. Thirty percent of Bell's 10,427 registered voters turned out to vote. Mayor Hernandez, Deputy Mayor Jacobo and Council member George Mirabal, were all recalled, with more than 95% of votes on each recall in favor. Although Councilmember Luis Artiga had resigned in October 2010, his recall remained on the ballot and his (moot) recall also passed with 95% of the vote. (Note: Hernandez's and Mirabal's recalls were also moot since their terms on the council had expired later in the month, and they did not run for re-election)

Danny Harber received 54% of the vote to gain Jacobo's seat. Filling the short term council seat vacated by Artiga's resignation, was Ana Maria Quintana, with 44% of the vote. The next day it was announced that Ali Saleh, Nestor Valencia and Violeta Alvarez would fill the other three council seats. Councilman Lorenzo Velez, the only Bell official not charged with wrongdoing, was also replaced on the city council.

Assembly Bill 93 allowed the City Clerk to swear in the new council and also allowed the Los Angeles County Board of Supervisors to validate the March 8 election results. Prior to that, the new city council would not have been able to take office because there was no quorum of the former city council to swear them in. They were sworn in during the last week of March 2011. The council designated Ali Saleh as mayor.

The California Fair Political Practices Commission announced on July 1, 2011, that it was investigating whether Bell's police union had violated state law when the union handed out a campaign flyer supporting their candidates in the recall election. The commission said it was also looking into whether the Bell Police Officers Association was properly noted as the source of the flyer. Three of the five council persons elected were those endorsed by the Bell Police Officers Association.

== Corruption hearings ==
=== City Council ===
The preliminary hearing for the alleged misappropriations and misdeeds of the Bell City council members charged, began on February 7, 2011. Councilman Lorenzo Velez, the only Bell official not charged with any wrongdoing, testified that he doesn't remember participating in any of the meetings for which other council members billed the city tens of thousands of dollars. Velez testified that he did not recall any of the council members doing any work for any of the committees or if there were ever actually any meetings held at all.

"I should have asked more questions, I'm not denying that", said Velez, the only member of the city council who did not take a large salary. "If ignorance is a crime, I guess I'm guilty." Velez was defeated in the March 2011 election. The defendants at this preliminary hearing were Hernandez, Jacobo, Mirabal, former Mayor George Cole and former Councilmen Luis Artiga and Victor Bello.

Former city clerk, Rebecca Valdez, testified at the hearing she was instructed by Rizzo to lie to a resident, Roger Ramirez, who had enquired about council members salaries. The first witness at the preliminary hearing, Ramirez testified that when he confronted Rizzo at a city council meeting, regarding the rumors that he was paid $400,000 a year, "He immediately said, 'No, Mr. Ramirez, if I would be making $400,000 a year I wouldn't be working here". Ramirez had previously filed a public records request with City Hall. The bogus records he was given showed Rizzo was earning about $15,000 per month, and City Council members a couple hundred dollars per month.

Valdez, who was granted limited immunity, stated she prepared the documents and Rizzo changed the correct figures much lower than the actual salaries; she was ordered to show the falsified lowered figures to Ramirez. She also testified that Rizzo awarded himself contracts with hefty raises without any approval from the city attorney.

Bell's administrative services director, Lourdes Garcia, said that City Clerk, Rebecca Valdez, confided to her some time later after Valdez gave Ramirez the falsified documents that Rizzo had directed Valdez to have Mayor Hernandez retroactively sign Rizzo's contracts, although Hernandez was not mayor during the period that the contracts were written. "She was crying", Garcia said about Valdez. "She was very nervous." Valdez testified at the earlier hearing that Rizzo had instructed her to give Ramirez the fabricated figures.

A pretrial hearing was set for May 2011 for the six defendants. They all had to be arraigned again after the judge made the decision to put them on trial. They all pleaded not guilty to all charges

The trial began January 22, 2013, with deliberations beginning February 28. Deliberations were halted February 28 after a juror admitted to discussing the trial outside of the jury room. An alternate juror was seated and deliberations continued. After 18 days of deliberations five councilmembers were found guilty on some of the charges and not guilty on an equal number of charges, with other charges split 9–3 in favor of guilt. Luis Artiga, who took office after the high pay began, was exonerated of all charges.

Subsequently, on March 21, a juror wrote notes to the judge requesting reconsideration of past verdicts, and another juror wrote a note accusing other jurors of bad behavior. "It seems that all hell has broken loose", remarked the judge to attorneys in the case. After another day of deliberation, the judge declared a mistrial on all remaining counts, leaving the prosecution to determine if they wanted the case retried.

=== Former City Manager and Assistant City Manager ===
At Rizzo's hearing, documents acquired from former Assistant City Manager Angela Spaccia's computer by District Attorney Steve Cooley showed that, starting in 2005, she and Rizzo created fraudulent contracts that were not sanctioned by the City Council that elevated their salaries to "outrageous" levels and made it almost impossible to tell how much they were being paid, according to the 19-page memorandum from Cooley. "Rizzo and Spaccia succeeded in concealing their conduct for so long, in part by trickery ... and in part by buying loyalty of city employees", the memo said.

Rizzo was regarded as the ringleader among the "Bell Eight", former Bell city officials (all of whom resigned or were recalled or fired), accused of bilking taxpayers out of about $5.5 million through hefty salaries, benefits and illegal loans of public money.

In his opening presentation, Rizzo's attorney, James Spertus, stated, "Everybody has agreed that it's not a crime to be paid too much." Later that day, February 23, 2011, Rizzo complained of chest pains and feeling light-headed and was carried out on a stretcher during his preliminary hearing. He held a towel over his face as paramedics removed him to an ambulance. He was transported to Good Samaritan Hospital, and the hearing was adjourned for the day. Rizzo was released from the hospital the next day. Rizzo returned to court the following Monday. The next day, Rizzo slept through a good part of the hearing.

On Friday of the same week, the focal point was Rizzo's enormous salary and what machinations were made for him to receive it. The main issue was who had signed Rizzo's employment contracts, since although the former city attorney acknowledged the signatures appeared to be his, he claimed he did not sign them. The D.A. claimed Rizzo had signed them himself.

A second preliminary hearing for misappropriation of public funds by Rizzo and Spaccia, began on March 22, 2011. The pair had already been ordered to stand trial on the previous charges. At that arraignment on March 24, 2011, Rizzo, Spaccia, former Mayor Hernandez and ex-councilman Luis Artiga plead not guilty to the charges that they plundered Bell of millions of dollars.

==== Additional charges ====
Rizzo and Spaccia were indicted on several new allegations by a Los Angeles grand jury on March 30, 2011. The allegations include new charges of misappropriating public funds, conflict of interest, falsifying public documents and secreting of public documents.

Another allegation was that the duo fabricated documents appearing to be contracts for former police Chief Randy Adams and secreted the true contracts' indication that his salary was nearly $10,000 more per pay period than purported. These indictments add eight charges to the public corruption case against Rizzo and seven former Bell officials.

==== Further hidden accounts ====
On April 25, 2011, it was revealed that two more illegal retirement accounts had been discovered. An additional $4.5 million was found secreted away to avoid retirement limits for public employees and to benefit Rizzo, Spaccia and a select few council members. Another account was found to be set up to benefit only Rizzo and Spaccia, letting them evade IRS regulations which cap government pensions. Lourdes Garcia, the city's director of administrative services, testified that Rizzo told her in 2008 that his goal was to put $14 million in the secondary pension fund, which would be paid by the city.

==== Ousted officials demanded more city funds ====
Several of the city officials requested that the city of Bell pay their legal bills. Hernandez, Jacobo and Cole were facing corruption charges for allegedly looting the city's treasury, according to the Los Angeles Times in January 2011. A city audit showed the city was close to bankruptcy. Cole's attorney, Ronald O. Kaye, claims that, although he was being paid approximately $100,000 a year for his part-time position and for attending meetings that did not occur or lasted only a few minutes, that "[A]t that time... Mr. Cole did not believe that his actions were unlawful." Superior Court Judge Henry J. Hall ordered in February 2011, that no compensation be paid to city officials without approval from the court.

Nevertheless, in March 2011, Rizzo, and two former councilmen, persisted in their claims that they were entitled to reimbursement from the city of Bell for their legal fees spent in defense against the charges against them, i.e., of defrauding the city of Bell. Former Bell City Attorney Edward Lee confirmed during a testimony in 2010 that he outlined the clause in Rizzo's contract that was intended to guarantee the former city manager defense funds "against any type of claim", according to the court papers. "All of the claims triggered a defense obligation from the city of Bell under Mr. Rizzo's employment agreement and he sent the claims to the city for a defense, but the tenders were all denied by the city", Rizzo's updated court papers attested. In June 2011, there was a hearing regarding Rizzo's request and the issue of intent in the employment agreement.

== Hearings ==
A two-sentence order denying the petition was later signed without comment by Justices Dennis M. Perluss and Laurie D. Zelon of the 2nd District Court of Appeal in Los Angeles.

In December 2011, Los Angeles County Superior Court Judge Kathleen Kennedy rejected their motion to drop the charges and the contention that their salaries were protected by the city's charter. She issued an extremely critical ten-page ruling that completely negated the politicians' claim that they had no intent of, or knowledge they could possibly be, breaking the law. "The city of Bell charter," Kennedy wrote, "did not make Bell a sovereign nation not subject to the general penal laws of the State of California."

On February 28, 2012, Judge Kennedy dismissed some felony charges against ex-Mayor Oscar Hernandez and two counts of misappropriation of public funds against former ex-councilman Luis Artiga. Hernandez and Artiga still faced charges of misappropriating funds in a separate case. The judge denied the motion to dismiss any charges against Rizzo and Spaccia.

In her February 9 ruling, Kennedy stated that Rizzo "virtually ran this loan program unilaterally" and distributed at least 40 loans totaling almost $2 million between 2001 and 2010. In rejecting the dismissal motion by Rizzo and Spaccia, Kennedy said they "simply set their own financial terms awarding themselves huge raises and other fringe benefits," and that "This is a textbook case of conflict of interest."

== Salary dispute ==
=== Bell city manager ===
Rizzo collected a salary of US$787,637 a year, with yearly 12% increases scheduled every July; he received $1.5 million in his last year. Rizzo remained unapologetic about his salary and said, "If that's a number people choke on, maybe I'm in the wrong business ... I could go into private business and make that kind of money. This council has compensated me for the job I've done." Spaccia concurred, saying: "I would have to argue you get what you pay for." Rizzo and Spaccia never earned similar salaries in the private sector.

In comparison, then-Los Angeles County Chief Executive William T. Fujioka earned $338,458. The President of the United States earns $400,000 per year. Rizzo also received an unusually large package of benefits, including paid vacation, and sick and personal time of 28 weeks off per year. In addition, both Rancho Cucamonga and Hesperia may be obligated to pay significant percentages of Rizzo's estimated $600,000 annual pension, according to Daily Press estimates. Rizzo would have received a pension of $880,000 annually.

In September 2010, Rizzo; Hernandez; Spaccia; and council members George Mirabal, Teresa Jacobo, Luis Artiga, George Cole, and Victor Bello were arrested and charged with misappropriation of public funds. When Hernandez refused to answer the door at his home, the sheriff's department used a battering ram to break down his door and bring out the mayor in handcuffs. He refused to resign from his mayoral office, and was recalled in March 2011.

Rizzo was released from jail after Los Angeles County Superior Court Judge Mary Lou Villar determined that the funds posted for his $2 million bail were not linked to any of the monies he acquired in Bell. Rizzo was required to turn in his passport and wear an electronic monitoring device. The bail bondsmen hired for Rizzo's $2 million bail, James Demayo and Morris Demayo, negotiated for several weeks with the prosecutor, Max Huntsman, to get his bail approved. The electronic monitor was insisted on by Huntsman.

Since his resignation, Rizzo continued to request that the city of Bell pay his legal bills. He also claimed the city owed him back pay. There was no such agreement made with Rizzo when he stepped down. "He resigned without severance pay", former councilman Velez stated, adding: "I will not even give [him] a penny cut in half."

Rizzo was ordered to stand trial on an additional conflict-of-interest charge regarding a racehorse deal with Bell's privately contracted planning director. Spaccia was charged with misappropriation of public funds.

== Police Chief ==
On September 24, 2010, the Los Angeles County District Attorney's Office finally began the investigation of former Bell Police Chief Randy Adams, as part of the expanding probe of city officials. When Adams was hired in 2009, he signed an agreement with Rizzo that stipulated that Adams suffered from back, knee, and neck injuries, and that the city would support his application for a disability pension (Liz O. Baylen, Los Angeles Times). Prosecutors filed suit regarding this, as Adams had himself declared disabled on the day of his being hired in Bell. The disability status stood to net Adams millions of dollars in a tax-free pension at taxpayers' expense. Under the agreement, the 59-year-old Adams would have received a lifetime disability benefit whenever he was ready to retire, meaning he would not have had to pay taxes on half of his $400,000+ annual pension. His Bell retirement would have been the third-richest in the state's huge pension system.

The state attorney filed suit against Adams and Bell following the report on his alleged disability. "You're only supposed to receive a disability retirement if you are disabled and unable to perform the normal duties of your job," said California Public Employees' Retirement System spokesman Ed Fong. "If that is not the case, it would be fraud."

The injuries Adams cited in order to collect millions of tax-free dollars from a law-enforcement disability pension did not stop him from taking rigorous spinning classes and running in a 5K race, the Glendale Downtown Dash, in 2009. Nor did it stop him from stating on a 2008 application for Orange County sheriff that he likes to ski and had been in the 120-mile Baker to Las Vegas Relay Run. When Adams applied for Orange County sheriff, the year before joining Bell, he did not mention having any physical problems, said Rick Francis, chief of staff for county Supervisor John Moorlach.

"He was not disabled", said Glendale City Manager Jim Starbird, who was Adams' boss until he left for Bell. "I never heard of someone being hired to work for a city and having that [disability] determination made going in." Glendale joined two other cities in trying to block what had the potential to be hundreds of thousands of dollars in pension payments for Adams, whose highly profitable term as police chief of Bell had far-reaching consequences to the state's complicated employee retirement system.

Adams' salary of $457,000 was roughly double that of then-Los Angeles Police Chief Charlie Beck who oversaw almost 10,000 officers. Bell's police department then numbered 48.

In February 2008, it was revealed on CBS News that Adams allegedly exchanged e-mails with the assistant city manager about how they were going to arrange his salary and hide it from Bell's citizens, making jokes about bilking the city. "I am looking forward to seeing you and taking all of Bell's money", Adams wrote, according to the memo. Adams was not charged or arrested.

In August 2010, the city of Bell began searching for a new police chief. Gilbert Jara, head of the Bell Police Officers Association, called the search "a good first step in ensuring not only public safety but also a restoration of the public's trust in Bell officials." The city of Bell has claimed it was negotiating with the Los Angeles Sheriff's Department to take over the policing contract; however, Sheriff Lee Baca's spokesman says that the L.A. County Auditor-Controller Wendy L. Watanabe, has made no contact with him regarding that possibility.

In October 2011, the city hired the first Interim Chief of Police since the scandal broke. Steve Belcher was retained as the interim chief and brought nearly 40 years of law enforcement experience. Belcher was tasked with giving the police department a critical look and providing the new city management with his recommendations. Belcher complied and served as the Interim Chief of Police for one year.

In October 2012, Bell Police Captain Anthony Miranda was promoted to Chief of Police after a nationwide search of more than 70 candidates.

In June 2015, the California Public Employees Retirement System (CalPERS) Board designated as precedential its decision to reduce former City of Bell police chief Randy Adams' requested pension by more than half. The Board's decision to designate the Adams' decision as precedential means that it can be officially cited in court, in other administrative proceedings, and may be applied broadly to other cases.

== More police caught in scandal ==
The office that manages retirement benefits for California public employees reportedly investigated the validity of pension plans for at least 10 police officers, including four chiefs, who received disability pensions and workers' compensation settlements when they were compelled to leave their jobs at the city of Bell. The California Public Employees Retirement System, or CalPERS, asked Bell officials to ascertain whether Rizzo approved retirement deals that enhanced payments to those officers, the Los Angeles Times reported on its website May 11, 2011.

"If Rizzo wanted to get rid of you, he'd make some way to pay you off and make it beneficial for you financially", said former Chief Andreas Probst, who was granted a $250,000 workers' compensation settlement and an annual disability retirement of $158,057. Probst claimed his retirement was properly handled because he had suffered on-duty injuries in a crash with a drunk driver. But he said Rizzo bundled severance pay, and pay for unused sick and vacation days, owed to him, into the workers' compensation settlement, which authorities said would violate the tax codes.

=== Other city officials ===
The city's website showed that seven more city workers received excessively high salaries, with two making more than $400,000 per year and three making more than $200,000. Assistant City Manager Angela Spaccia collected $376,288 a year, with a similar 12% annual pay increase, more than the top administrator for Los Angeles County. Bell Police Chief Adams, who oversaw a 46-person department, had an annual salary of $457,000, which is 33% higher than the LAPD police chief, Charlie Beck who oversees 12,899 employees in Los Angeles and earns $307,000. In 2009, 11 officers in Bell were paid more than $10,000 in overtime. One officer billed $26,109 in overtime.

All of the part-time city council members collected almost $100,000 a year, excepting Councilman Lorenzo Velez. Velez, who was paid only about $8,000 a year for his service on the council, has said he had no idea of the exorbitant salaries other officials were collecting. He has also testified that he didn't remember participating in any of the meetings for which other council members billed the city tens of thousands of dollars. Council members in cities similar to Bell in size make an average of $4,800 a year. California Attorney General Jerry Brown and L.A. prosecutors investigated whether the council salaries violated a state law that regulates how much council members are paid.

Lourdes Garcia, the city's director of administrative services, and Eric Eggena, the director of general services, were paid an annual salary of $231,000 each. Garcia has since agreed to a 28% pay cut down to $165,000 per year, and Eggena was terminated. An unnamed third official was also let go.

Bell officials voted unanimously to consider legal action against city officials, political consultants, and others.

State lawmakers and investigators traveled to the city of Bell on November 8, 2010, to probe the Los Angeles suburb's alleged corruption and governance problems. When residents were told by the state auditor that their leaders mismanaged tens of millions of dollars of the blue-collar city's money, using it largely to pay themselves enormous salaries, they "gasped in shock and disbelief." The auditors spoke at the hearing called by state Assemblyman Hector De La Torre, who said he wanted to give residents of the working-class city of 36,000 "a full accounting of what had happened".

The Los Angeles Times reported that in a review of state and local records it was discovered that independent audits of public agencies in California frequently failed to recognize and note cases of questionable mismanagement and obvious fraud. The report cites San Diego, Compton and South Gate as other cities plagued by public corruption that received dubiously clean audits. "Bell residents know their civic house is in disarray," said Supervisor Gloria Molina. "There is no way order can be restored in Bell until residents there have an accurate picture of the city's finances."

== Further investigations ==
=== Real estate deal ===
Officials in Bell paid more than double the appraised value for a parcel of land that was never redeveloped, and was subsequently leased by a car wash. The Los Angeles Times reported that Rizzo and former General Services Manager Eric Eggena negotiated its purchase for $1.35 million, despite its appraisal of $612,000. "This is a real estate deal that ran amok", said Larry Kosmont, a Los Angeles real estate consultant. "Essentially, they cooked the books on this".

=== Civil rights violations ===
The FBI has begun investigating the accusations of violating some citizens' civil rights, particularly whether Bell officials violated the civil rights of Latino residents by assertively towing targeted cars and charging residents extortionate fees to retrieve their vehicles. A memo titled Bell Police Department Baseball Game lists "points" for officers to ticket for various targeted infractions. Police officers in Bell said in interviews in August 2010 that they frequently spent their shifts pulling over vehicles for small infractions hoping that they would be unlicensed drivers. "Although officers didn't look exclusively for immigrants, it was clear that the majority of the drivers pulled over turned out to be illegal immigrants", Officer Kurt Owens said. "We'd look for younger guys in their 20s and 30s, guys with junkier cars, broken lights, loud music or tinted windows", Owens added.

Bell's budget shows that the city was generating increased income from fees and taxes over several years. Bell's records show that the city made nearly a million dollars just in impound fees in fiscal year 2008–09, which works out to be about $10 per citizen in this small town. Bell was charging $300 for unlicensed motorists to recover their cars, three times what Los Angeles County and neighboring cities charge. "All of this was just a means by Rizzo to nickel and dime the community to death to get more money out of them", Cristina Garcia, a community activist, said.

=== Demands for additional business fees ===
The Los Angeles Times reported on November 1, 2010, that for at least a decade, officials in Bell arbitrarily required some businesses to make payments to the city totalling tens of thousands of dollars annually, and in at least one case threatening a business owner with closure if he failed to comply. The Oregonian editorialized that "Local businesses were shook down, Sopranos-style, just to stay open."

=== "Breast Cancer Awareness" funds ===
The City of Bell raised a reported $100,000 from multi-year breast cancer awareness fundraisers. Former vice-mayor Teresa Jacobo was one of the leaders of those campaigns and the people of Bell are trying to find out where those charitable contributions went and if any funds were ever donated to breast cancer awareness organizations.

=== Property taxes ===
An investigation into the city's property taxes found that the homeowners of Bell were paying a rate higher than those of the affluent Beverly Hills. Homeowners in Bell paid the second-highest tax rate of any city in Los Angeles County. Wendy Watanabe, Los Angeles County's auditor-controller, stated that residents of Bell paid as much as 1.55% of their home's assessed value in taxes, 34% above the county average of 1.16%. State Controller John Chiang said the raised rate was illegal. Auditors discovered that taxpayers were overcharged by $2.9 million for a "retirement tax" to fund city employee pensions.

Under California's state tax code, the nearly $3 million overpaid by Bell homeowners should have been redirected to local schools; however, on September 1, 2010, lawmakers approved AB 900 by Assemblyman Kevin De Leon (D-Los Angeles), which returned $2.9 million in property tax refunds directly to the overcharged city residents. On September 13, 2010, Lieutenant Governor Abel Maldonado, approved the bill.

=== Illegal sewer fees ===
The city of Bell assessed property owners for sewer fees without getting the mandated voter approval. The Times acquired a letter to the city in which Controller John Chiang stated that property owners overpaid $621,737 in fees that were illegally increased since 2007. The extra tax added about $20 per parcel for each of the last three years' tax bills. After the salary scandal surfaced in July 2010, about a hundred residents protested at City Council meetings, saying they believed that their taxes were too high. Many residents said they had noticed assessments on their tax bills that they were never informed of and did not understand. ABC News announced that Bell homeowners who had overpaid their property taxes over the last three years would be refunded the funds that were collected illegally. In September 2010, Lieutenant Governor Maldonado signed Assembly Bill 900, which returned $3,000,000 collected from 4,000 residents.

=== Auditor negligence ===
In connection with an accusation (AC2012-17) that the auditing firm Mayer Hoffman McCann P.C. (MHM) of Irvine, California "committed repeated acts of negligence on more than one occasion in the 2009 audit of the City of Bell (Bell) and the Bell Community Redevelopment Agency (Bell CRA) that departed from professional standards" and "insufficiently documented its audit for Bell and the Bell CRA for the year ending June 30, 2009" the California Board of Accountancy suspended MHM's CPA Corporation License for six months stayed, with two years' probation, and imposed on it an administrative penalty of $300,000, among other enforcement actions, effective June 2012.

Journalist Terry Francke stated that "the Bell spectacle is what happens to communities without their own old-fashioned diligent news coverage by veteran newspaper reporters, or at least smart reporters led by veteran newspaper editors."

== Impact ==
U.S. Rep. Adam Schiff, (D-Pasadena), appealed to federal prosecutors to scrutinize the widespread political corruption in Los Angeles County. At least six other cities where officials have been recently charged with corruption include Irwindale, La Puente, Monterey Park, Pico Rivera, Temple City, and Vernon. "A much more rigorous focus is obviously merited by events", Schiff said, citing statutes that specifically aim at scams involving taxpayer dollars. "Some of these cases are difficult to prosecute (at the local level) and where the U.S. Attorney does very well is chasing it down." Schiff said he would like to see federal prosecutors look closely at these several cities beside Bell. "I think they have a compelling interest ...The federal government clearly has jurisdiction in public corruption investigations", Schiff said.

The crackdown in Bell received extensive coverage in the Spanish-language media and has resonated among voters in blue-collar Latino communities who often feel neglected in terms of both government services and the justice system," said Jaime Regalado, director of the Edmund G. "Pat" Brown Institute of Public Affairs at California State University, Los Angeles.

The Palm Springs Desert Sun maintained, in an editorial:

That, in a very disturbing way, we all owe the community of Bell thanks. The elected and unelected hierarchy of that [small] city went to the extremes while its voters slept... As it is today, every California citizen has a right to ask public agencies for an accounting of their taxpayer-funded salaries and other compensation. That goes for any public employee—from the city manager and council members to any teacher or librarian.

== Awards for exposé of scandal ==
Los Angeles Times reporters Ruben Vives and Jeff Gottlieb were awarded the Selden Ring Award for Investigative Reporting for the exposé of the Bell salary scandal, 'Breach of Faith'. The award, presented by the Annenberg School for Communication & Journalism, is a prize worth $35,000. On April 18, 2011, it was announced that the L.A. Times had won the Pulitzer Prize for Public Service reporting on breaking the Bell scandal.

The L.A. Times announced the winners of its in-house editorial awards May 2011. The paper's Pulitzer Prize-winning Bell coverage won in the "investigations" category as well as the Publisher's Prize. The Times' publisher Eddie Hartenstein said of his paper's Bell coverage: "Robert Rizzo and his cronies, I think, savored their windfall and knew all too well what they were doing and knew they had to keep it secret. And if anyone was bold enough to uncover it, it was some of our folks here. They went to ask the city clerks at Bell, Calif., and the response they got repeatedly was 'Those records aren't available; come back in two weeks.' But they wouldn't accept that ... [W]hen [the lid] finally came off the Bell salary scandal, it was not because of a grand jury or a conscience-stricken official or anything like that. It was because of two intrepid L.A. Times reporters."
