= Bob Cohn =

American journalist and media executive (born 1963)

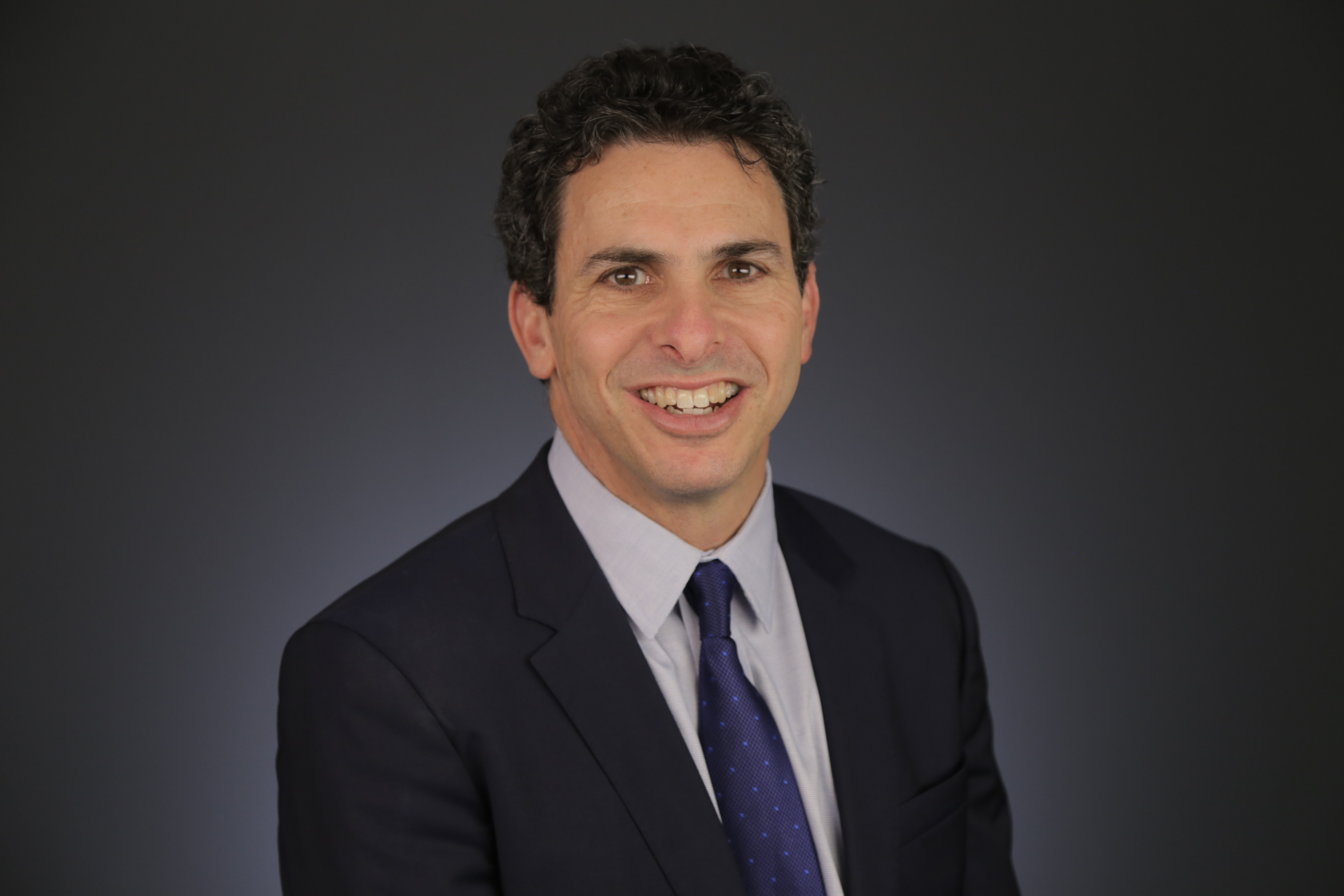
- Cohn in 2017
- Born: Robert Cohn; April 18, 1963 (age 63)
- Education: Stanford University; Yale University
- Occupations: Journalist and media executive
- Title: CEO of The Venetoulis Institute of Local Journalism
- Spouse: Sharon Dennis

Bob Cohn (born April 18, 1963) is an American journalist and media executive who serves as CEO of the Venetoulis Institute for Local Journalism, the nonprofit start-up that oversees The Baltimore Banner and Pittsburgh Post-Gazette. He previously was president of The Economist and The Atlantic, was a top editor at The Atlantic and Wired, and worked as a Washington correspondent at Newsweek.

== Early life ==
Cohn grew up in Chicago and graduated from Stanford University. He has a Masters in the Study of Law from Yale Law School, where he was a Ford Foundation Fellow.

== Career ==
Cohn arrived at the Venetoulis Institute as president and CEO of The Banner, a Maryland news organization launched in 2022. He leads The Banner’s overall strategy and operations, responsible for its business, editorial and financial efforts to ensure the publication’s long-term success. In his first two years, the digital publication grew revenue by 85% and subscribers by 78%, with 85,000 paid subscribers by summer of 2026. Cohn oversaw the expansion of The Banner into broader Maryland, including an ambitious move into Montgomery and Prince George's Counties, the largest counties in Maryland and bedroom communities for Washington, D.C. In May 2025, The Banner won a Pulitzer Prize for its series, in partnership with the New York Times Local Investigations Fellowship, on the drug overdose crisis in Baltimore City.

In May 2026, Venetoulis purchased the Pittsburgh Post-Gazette and Cohn became CEO of both publications. The Post-Gazette traces its founding to 1786 and is the largest news organization in western Pennsylvania. The two properties have separate newsrooms and advertising teams and share back-office functions under Venetoulis.

At The Economist, Cohn was responsible for global business performance of the iconic publication, including all aspects of the business in digital, print and audio. His primary focus was on consumer and corporate subscriptions and new commercial initiatives in education, podcasting and customer engagement. During his tenure, revenue grew each year and total subscribers hit an all-time high.

As president at The Atlantic, Cohn led the brand to record audiences, revenue, and profitability. He was responsible for The Atlantic's print, digital, live events, and consulting platforms. He was named to the job in 2014 after five years as editor of Atlantic Digital, where he built and managed teams at TheAtlantic.com, The Wire, and CityLab, and grew the audience ten-fold. He joined The Atlantic in January 2009. In a memo announcing Cohn’s departure, Atlantic chairman David Bradley wrote of Cohn’s work building out the digital presence and resetting business performance: ”Bob was the central animating figure in the two great revolutions in my time with the publication.”

Cohn began his journalism career at Newsweek, where he worked in the Washington, D.C., bureau for 10 years. He covered the Supreme Court and the Justice Department for three years during the presidency of George H. W. Bush, and the Clinton White House from 1993 to 1996. In 1996, he moved to California to be editor and publisher of Stanford Magazine. He then worked two years as executive editor of The Industry Standard in San Francisco, before taking a job as executive editor at Wired magazine, where he worked from 2001 to 2008. At Wired, Cohn helped the magazine find a mainstream following and earn national recognition, including three National Magazine Awards for General Excellence during his tenure.

== Awards ==
In 2018, Cohn was named Publishing Executive of the Year by Adweek. He helped lead The Atlantic to National Magazine Awards for Magazine of the Year (2016) and Best Website (2013). The Atlantic was named Publisher of the Year by Digiday in 2016, and to Advertising Age's Magazine A-List in that same year. TheAtlantic.com was a finalist for a National Magazine Award for General Excellence in 2010, 2011, and 2012. During his tenure at Wired, the magazine won three National Magazine Awards for General Excellence. At Stanford, his team won the Robert Sibley Magazine of the Year Award from the Council for the Advancement and Support of Education for best university publication in the country. In 1992 he won the American Bar Association's Silver Gavel Award for coverage of the Supreme Court nomination process.

In 2009, Cohn was named a Huffington Post Game Changer in Media, along with Atlantic editor James Bennet. Washingtonian selected Cohn as one of its “Movers and Shakers Behind the Scenes," while "GQ" picked him as one of “50 Most Powerful People in Washington.”

In 2019, Cohn did a one-semester on-campus fellowship at Harvard’s Institute of Politics, where he created and taught a course on Media and Politics in a Time of Disruption and participated in the life of the Institute and the University.
