= Martha Escutia =

American politician and attorney (born 1957)

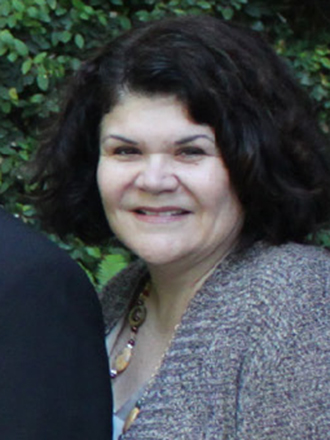
- Escutia in 2013

Member of the California State Senate from the 30th district
- In office December 7, 1998 – November 30, 2006
- Preceded by: Charles Calderon
- Succeeded by: Ronald Calderon

Member of the California State Assembly from the 50th district
- In office December 7, 1992 – November 30, 1998
- Preceded by: Curtis R. Tucker Jr.
- Succeeded by: Marco Antonio Firebaugh

Personal details
- Born: January 16, 1957 (age 69) East Los Angeles, California, U.S.
- Party: Democratic
- Spouse: Leo Victor Briones (m. 1994)
- Children: 2
- Education: University of Southern California (BS); Georgetown University (JD)

Martha M. Escutia (born January 16, 1957) is an American politician and attorney. She served in the California Assembly from 1992 to 1998 and the California Senate from 1998 to 2006.

== Early life and education ==
Escutia was born and raised in East Los Angeles, California. She earned a Bachelor's degree in public administration from the University of Southern California and a J.D. from Georgetown University Law Center. She also holds certificates in Advanced International Legal Studies relating to Trade and Tariffs from the World Court at The Hague and in Foreign Investment from the National Autonomous University in Mexico City.

== Career ==
Escutia represented California’s 30th District. In the Senate, she chaired the Committee on Energy, Utilities and Communications (EU&C), as well as the Health and Human Services Committee. She was the first Latina to chair the Senate Judiciary Committee. In the Assembly, she was the first woman to chair the Judiciary Committee. She also became the first woman to lead the 27-member California Legislative Latino Caucus and chaired the California Legislative Women's Caucus.

Escutia authored legislation that established the first low-cost auto insurance program for low-income residents in Los Angeles County, California and San Francisco, California.

She was named "Legislator of the Year" by the California Labor Federation (AFL-CIO), received the "Good Housekeeping Award for Women in Government" for her work on Children's Environmental Health Protections, and in 1999, she earned the "Legislator of the Year Award" from the California School Boards Association.

In November 2005, the Corona New Primary Center in Bell, California, was renamed the Martha Escutia Primary Center in her honor.

Since 2013, Escutia has served as Vice President for Government Relations at the University of Southern California. She also served as a Fellow at the USC Center for the Political Future.

Escutia also serves on the Board for College Futures, a nonprofit that seeks to increase the rate of postsecondary education completion among underserved populations.

As of 2019, Escutia was appointed to the California High Speed Rail Authority Board. The Authority is responsible for the planning, designing, building and operating of the high-speed rail line.

== Personal life ==
Escutia married Leo Victor Briones in 1994. They have two children.

California Assembly
Preceded by Curtis Tucker	Member of the California Assembly from the 50th district 1992–1998	Succeeded by Marco Antonio Firebaugh
California Senate
Preceded by Charles M. Calderon	Member of the California Senate from the 30th district 1998–2006	Succeeded by Ronald S. Calderon
