= Richard Bloom =

American politician

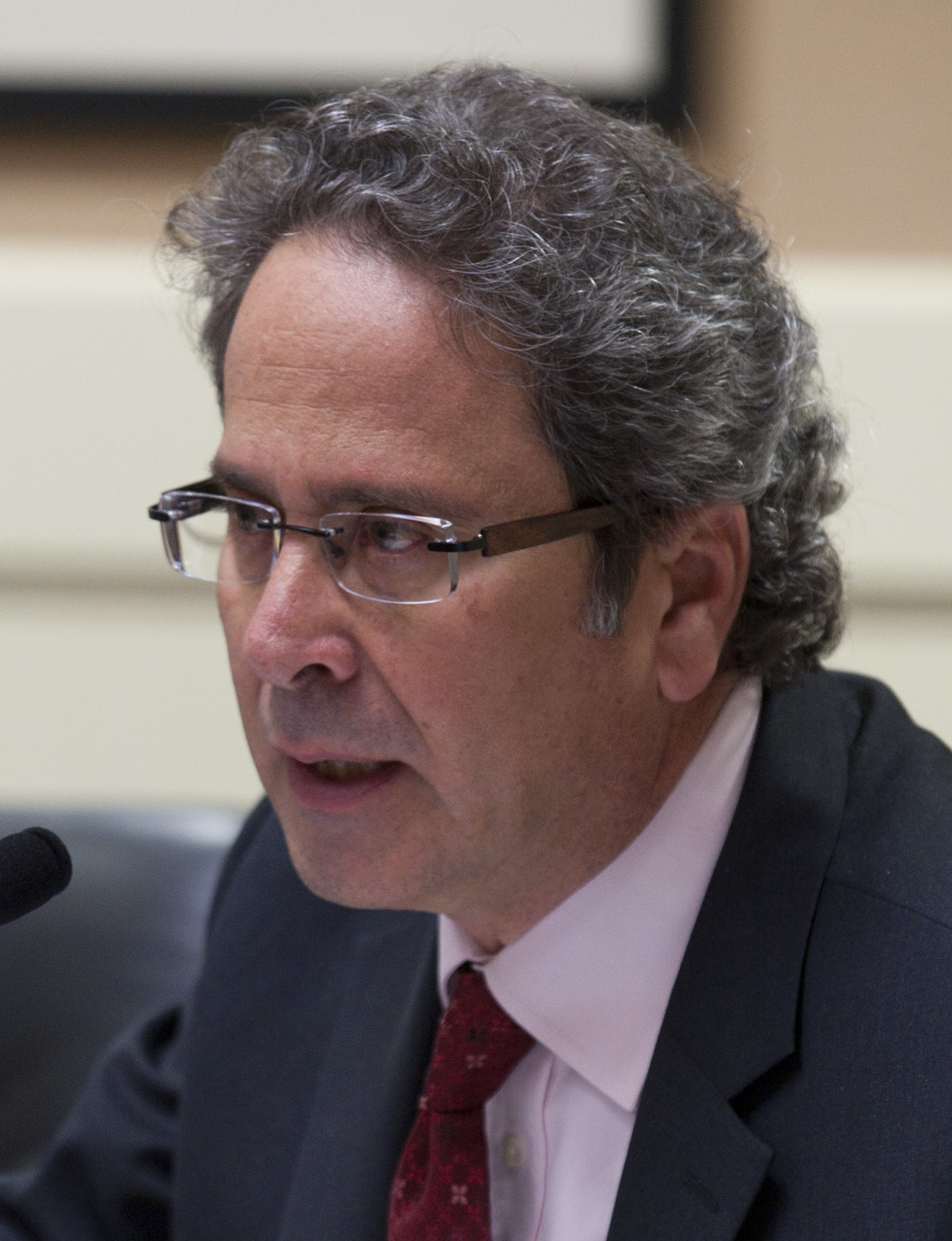

Superior Court of Los Angeles County
- In office January 31, 2023 – January 17, 2025
- Appointed by: Gavin Newsom
- Preceded by: Veronica Ramos

Member of the California State Assembly
- In office December 3, 2012 – December 5, 2022
- Preceded by: Ricardo Lara
- Succeeded by: Rick Zbur

Mayor of Santa Monica
- In office December 2010 – December 2012
- Preceded by: Terry O'Day
- Succeeded by: Gleam Davis, Kevin McKeown

Member of the Santa Monica City Council
- In office 1999–2012

Personal details
- Born: June 22, 1953 (age 73) Philadelphia, Pennsylvania, U.S.
- Party: Democratic
- Spouse: Robbie Black
- Children: 2
- Education: University of California, Berkeley (BA); Loyola Marymount University (JD)
- Profession: Attorney
- Website: www.richardbloom.com

Richard Hershel Bloom (born June 22, 1953) is an American attorney, politician, and jurist. Bloom was most recently a state judge in the Superior Court of Los Angeles County, and now serves as a lawyer and consultant in Santa Monica, California. A member of the Democratic Party, Bloom formerly served as a member of the California State Assembly for the 50th district from 2012 to 2022, which encompasses West Los Angeles, Beverly Hills, Agoura Hills, Malibu, Topanga, and Santa Monica.

Prior to being elected to the Assembly in 2012, he served as mayor of the independent enclave of Santa Monica within Los Angeles. For thirteen years he was a member of the Santa Monica City Council. On January 31, 2023, Bloom was appointed a state judge by Governor Gavin Newsom. In January 2025, he announced he would step down from the court after serving two years.

== Early life and education ==
Bloom was born to an Ashkenazi Jewish family and raised in Altadena and West Los Angeles. He earned a Bachelor of Arts degree in communication from the University of California, Berkeley and a Juris Doctor from the Loyola Law School.

== Career ==
Bloom has served in local and state level politics after practicing law from 1978 to 2005 as a sole practitioner. From 2005 to 2007, he was the Executive Director of Levitt Quinn Family Law Center in Santa Monica, California. Afterward, he also served as the Executive Director of People Assisting the Homeless from 2008 to 2010.

As Superior County Judge in Los Angeles county, he served as the judge in a popularized harassment case between rappers Meg The Stallion and Tory Lanez.

=== Santa Monica City Council ===
First elected in 1999, Bloom served on the Santa Monica City Council for 13 years, serving three terms as the mayor and two terms as mayor pro-tempore. Bloom also served as Chair of the Santa Monica Bay Restoration Commission.

=== California Assembly ===
Bloom defeated incumbent Assemblymember Betsy Butler in 2012.

Bloom serves on the following Assembly committees: Transportation, Budget, Arts & Entertainment, Environmental Safety and Toxic Materials, and Higher Education. He also serves on Assembly Budget Subcommittee No. 6 on Budget Process, Oversight and Program Evaluation and is the Chairman of the Assembly Budget Subcommittee No. 3 on Resources and Transportation. Bloom was also member of the California Legislative Jewish Caucus.

On November 4, 2014, Bloom was re-elected to a second term with nearly 72% of the vote. Bloom did not run in the 2022 election. On December 5, 2022, Rick Chavez Zbur was sworn in as Bloom's successor.

==== Environment ====
In 2013, Bloom authored the Bobcat Protection Act, which has since been signed into law, but did not result in protection of the Bobcat due to loopholes. Public pressure played a key role to influence the California governor to direct the California Department of Fish and Wildlife to ban trapping of the bobcat within the state. Despite the new legislation, hunting or trapping the bobcat within the state's national parks or the California State Parks has been illegal since 1918.

On March 7, 2014, Bloom introduced legislation AB2140 to ban live performances and captive breeding of orcas. The bill stalled in the state in April 2014. The legislation, if passed, would have effectively ended SeaWorld San Diego's "Shamu" performances. Despite the failure of the bill in the legislature, amid growing pressure from the documentary Blackfish, released in 2013, SeaWorld changed its orca show from live stunts to an educational focus. In 2015, Bloom introduced a separate but similar bill, the Orca Welfare and Safety Act to ban captive orca performances. In 2016, the bill passed both chambers, entering effect in 2017. SeaWorld San Diego had already stopped its breeding program in March 2016, and following the death of the orca Tilikum, abandoned its live orca show in 2017, with other SeaWorld locations following suit by 2019.

In 2019, Bloom introduced legislation to ban second-generation anticoagulant rodenticides. The bill passed as the California Ecosystems Protection Act in 2020.

In the 2015 legislative session, Bloom introduced AB888 to ban plastic microbeads in personal care products. The purpose was to eliminate the use of plastics within facial scrubs. The bill was signed into law by Governor Jerry Brown.

==== Culture and arts ====
Bloom also authored Assembly Bill 189 which was signed into law and established the California Cultural Districts program.

== Electoral history ==
=== 2014 California State Assembly ===
California's 50th State Assembly district election, 2014
Primary election
Party	Candidate	Votes	%
Democratic	Richard Bloom (incumbent)	42,332	73.4
Republican	Bradley S. Torgan	15,370	26.6
Total votes		57,702	100.0
General election
Democratic	Richard Bloom (incumbent)	78,093	71.5
Republican	Bradley S. Torgan	31,113	28.5
Total votes		109,206	100.0
Democratic hold			

=== 2016 California State Assembly ===
California's 50th State Assembly district election, 2016
Primary election
Party	Candidate	Votes	%
Democratic	Richard Bloom (incumbent)	92,315	79.6
Republican	Matthew Gene Craffey	23,613	20.4
Total votes		115,928	100.0
General election
Democratic	Richard Bloom (incumbent)	158,967	74.6
Republican	Matthew Gene Craffey	54,016	25.4
Total votes		212,983	100.0
Democratic hold			

=== 2018 California State Assembly ===
California's 50th State Assembly district election, 2018
Primary election
Party	Candidate	Votes	%
Democratic	Richard Bloom (incumbent)	79,458	100.0
Total votes		79,458	100.0
General election
Democratic	Richard Bloom (incumbent)	167,428	100.0
Total votes		167,428	100.0
Democratic hold			

=== 2020 California State Assembly ===
2020 California's 50th State Assembly district election
Primary election
Party	Candidate	Votes	%
Democratic	Richard Bloom (incumbent)	89,797	78.7%
Democratic	Will Hess	16,482	14.5%
Democratic	Jim King	7,750	6.8%
Total votes			
Democratic hold			
