= John A. Bliss =

American politician

Member of the California State Assembly from the 50th district
- In office January 2, 1899 - January 7, 1907
- Preceded by: Hart H. North
- Succeeded by: John W. Stetson

Personal details
- Born: February 13, 1843 Wilbraham, Massachusetts
- Died: 1925 (aged 81–82)
- Party: Republican
- Spouse: Amy E Richards
- Children: 1

John Adams Bliss (February 13, 1843 - 1925) served in the California State Assembly for the 50th district from 1899 to 1907 and during the American Civil War he served in the United States Army.
