= John C. Bliss =

American educator and college administrator (1868–1924)

John Carlton Bliss (April 18, 1868 – January 19, 1924) was an American educator and college administrator. He was educated at Cornell University with an A.B. in 1889. He served as president of what is now State University of New York at New Paltz from 1908 to 1923.
