= Marco Antonio Firebaugh =

American politician

Member of the California State Assembly from the 50th district
- In office December 7, 1998 - November 30, 2004
- Preceded by: Martha Escutia
- Succeeded by: Hector De La Torre

Personal details
- Born: October 13, 1966 Tijuana, Baja California, Mexico
- Died: March 21, 2006 (aged 39) California, U.S.
- Party: Democratic
- Children: 2
- Education: University of California, Berkeley (BA); University of California, Los Angeles (JD)

Marco Antonio Firebaugh (October 13, 1966 – March 21, 2006) was a Democratic member of the California State Assembly from 1998 until 2004.

== Early life and education ==
Born in Tijuana, Baja California, Mexico, Firebaugh received a B.A. degree in political science from the University of California, Berkeley, and a J.D. degree from University of California, Los Angeles, School of Law.

== Career ==
Firebaugh was elected to the California State Assembly in 1998. In his final term in the Assembly, Firebaugh served concurrently as Assembly Majority Leader and Chairman of the California Latino Legislative Caucus.

At the time of his death, Firebaugh had been seeking the Democratic nomination for the 30th district seat in the California State Senate, and was removed from the ballot.

== Personal life ==
Firebaugh was a resident of South Gate, California. He died from complications from a liver ailment with which he was diagnosed in 2003.

== See also ==
- Marco Antonio Firebaugh High School

California Assembly
Preceded by Martha Escutia	California State Assemblyman, 50th District; December 7, 1998 - November 30, 2004	Succeeded by Hector De La Torre
