= Hector De La Torre =

American politician

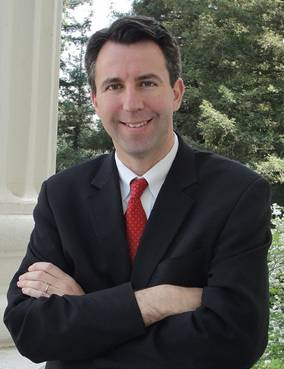

Member of the California State Assembly from the 50th district
- In office December 6, 2004 – November 30, 2010
- Preceded by: Marco Antonio Firebaugh
- Succeeded by: Ricardo Lara

Personal details
- Born: May 29, 1967 (age 59) Los Angeles, California, U.S.
- Party: Democratic
- Spouse: Christine
- Children: 3
- Education: Occidental College (BA); George Washington University (MA)

Hector De La Torre (born May 29, 1967) is an American politician from Los Angeles County, California who served in the California State Assembly from 2004 to 2010. A Democrat, he represented the largely Latino 50th Assembly district.

== Personal life and education ==
De La Torre's parents immigrated to the United States from Mexico in the 1960s. He grew up in South Gate and taught at Edison Junior High in South Los Angeles.

De La Torre majored in diplomacy and world affairs at Occidental College in Los Angeles and attended graduate school at George Washington University in Washington, D.C. He and his wife, Christine, live in South Gate with their children, Elinor, Henrik, and Emilia.

== Early career ==
Prior to his election to the Assembly, he worked as judicial administrator with the California Superior Court in Los Angeles for three years. He also served as legislative director for former California congressman Richard H. Lehman (D-CA) and on the staff of congressman Alan Wheat (D-MO). In 1995, he was appointed chief of staff to the deputy secretary of labor in the Clinton Administration.

== South Gate city council ==
De La Torre was elected to the South Gate City Council in 1997 and served until 2004, serving as mayor for two of those years. He represented the city on the Executive Board of the Gateway Cities Council of Governments, where he played a key role in developing plans to improve the I-710 Freeway. He served on the San Gabriel and Lower Los Angeles Mountains and Rivers Conservancy where he supported the preservation of open space throughout the district.

As Mayor, he worked to improve relations between the city, the community, and the police department. He helped build new parks, addressed budget issues, helped to improve the transportation infrastructure, and improved senior programs and education for the city's children. In order to alleviate overcrowding, De La Torre fought for new and better school facilities. He fought for honest and effective government, and led South Gate residents in a grassroots campaign to recall corrupt elected officials, stabilize the city's financial condition, and rebuild public trust.

=== Role in South Gate corruption scandal ===
De La Torre was one of only two council members not involved in the corruption scandal, which prompted a January 2003 recall of three other members of the city council, as well as the South Gate city treasurer. The recall, which he helped lead, was the culmination of a long fight to clean up the corruption in South Gate.

For years, South Gate had been unofficially controlled by Albert T. Robles, who once boasted to being the "King of South Gate." Politicians who ran against the Robles slate often found themselves the victims of anonymous, libelous campaign mailers. For example, some were charged with child molestation, alcoholism, and not supporting children living in other states—all unfounded claims.

During his reelection campaign for city council, Hector De La Torre was challenged by a political unknown who was also named Hector De La Torre. The incumbent charged that this was an attempt to confuse voters and remove him from the city council. Despite the challenge, City Councilmember De La Torre came in first in the election.

Robles's critics faced personal as well as political danger. Many received death threats. Joseph Ruiz, a political activist who campaigned against Robles's allies, fell victim to arson when his business was hit with four Molotov cocktails. And Henry Gonzalez, then mayor of South Gate, was shot in the head by an unknown assailant.

The January 2003 recall ousted Robles from his position as City Treasurer, along with three of his allies on the City Council. The recall effort passed by a resounding 8-1 ratio. By the time the new councilmembers were sworn in, the Robles majority on the City Council had completely depleted the eight million dollars in the city's reserve.

According to the Los Angeles Times, Albert Robles was indicted "on 39 counts of money laundering, bribery, wire fraud and public corruption." Prosecutors argued that "he used his elected office and political influence to funnel money from city projects to family and friends between 1998 and 2003." De La Torre testified in the trial against the former city treasurer. Robles was sentenced to 10 years in federal prison.

== Member of the California State Assembly ==
De La Torre served as Chair of the Accountability and Administrative Review Committee, responsible for overseeing the implementation of state programs and identifying potential savings. In addition, he served on the following standing committees: Budget, Health, Housing and Community Development, Budget Subcommittee #1 on Health and Human Services and Budget Subcommittee #4 on State Administration.

== Runs for Congress ==
In 2002, De La Torre ran for the House of Representatives to represent California's 39th Congressional District. He came in second in a six-person Democratic primary, losing to Linda Sánchez by a 29-33 margin.

In late 2025, De La Torre announced another run for the House of Representatives, this time in the 41st congressional district, which shifted from the Inland Empire and the outskirts of the Coachella Valley to southeast Los Angeles County following the passage of Proposition 50.

== Campaign for State Insurance Commissioner ==
In 2010, De La Torre ran for California Insurance Commissioner, a position vacated by Republican Steve Poizner, who ran unsuccessfully for governor. He ran on a platform of increasing access to health care and ensuring that patients get the best care from insurance companies. He was endorsed by the California Nurses Association, the CA Professional Firefighters, the California Medical Association, and the California League of Conservation Voters. De La Torre lost in the Democratic primaries on June 8, 2010 to Dave Jones.

== Other ventures ==
In October, 2011, California governor Jerry Brown appointed De La Torre to the California Air Resources Board, filling the position vacated by Lydia Kennard. He was later reappointed to the board, this time by Speaker of the California State Assembly Anthony Rendon, for an additional six year term, expiring January 1, 2025.

In August 2023, De La Torre was appointed as executive director of the Gateway Cities Council of Governments (GCCOG).
