= California's 50th State Assembly district =

American legislative district

Current assemblymember
Robert Garcia; D–Rancho Cucamonga
- Population (2020) • Voting age: 489,965; 368,013
- Demographics: 21.70% White; 7.98% Black; 75.11% Latino; 10.48% Asian; 0.26% Native American; 0.24% Hawaiian/Pacific Islander; 0.49% other; 2.38% remainder of multiracial

California's 50th State Assembly district is one of 80 California State Assembly districts. It is currently represented by Democrat Robert Garcia of Rancho Cucamonga.

== District profile ==
District map (2012 - 2022)

Prior to 2022, the district encompassed the area between the Pacific Ocean and the Santa Monica Mountains, along with a large section of Central Los Angeles. The district was heavily white and included the Malibu shoreline and much of Hollywood. The district currently consists of portions of San Bernardino County, including the whole Cities of Loma Linda and Colton, and portions of the Cities of San Bernardino, Redlands, Rialto, Rancho Cucamonga, Fontana, and Ontario.

== Election results from statewide races ==
Year	Office	Results
2021	Recall	No 76.9 – 23.1%
2020	President	Biden 74.3 - 22.3%
2018	Governor	Newsom 78.0 – 22.0%
2018	Senator	Feinstein 63.6 – 36.4%
2016	President	Clinton 76.7 – 18.3%
2016	Senator	Harris 75.8 – 24.2%
2014	Governor	Brown 73.5 – 26.5%
2012	President	Obama 70.8 – 26.5%
2012	Senator	Feinstein 75.0 – 25.0%

== List of assembly members representing the district ==
Due to redistricting, the 50th district has been moved around different parts of the state. The current iteration resulted from the 2021 redistricting by the California Citizens Redistricting Commission.

Assembly members	Party	Years served	Counties represented	Notes
Lucien Heath	Republican	January 5, 1885 – January 3, 1887	Santa Cruz	
Jesse Cope	Democratic	January 3, 1887 – January 7, 1889	Santa Cruz	
James A. Hall	Democratic	January 7, 1889 – January 5, 1891	Santa Cruz	
W. H. Galbraith	Republican	January 5, 1891 – January 2, 1893	Santa Cruz	
Grant I. Taggart	Republican	January 2, 1893 – January 7, 1895	Alameda	
Hart H. North	Republican	January 7, 1895 – January 2, 1899	Alameda	
John A. Bliss	Republican	January 2, 1899 – January 7, 1907	Alameda	
John W. Stetson	Republican	January 7, 1907 – January 4, 1909	Alameda	
Harry W. Pulcifer	Republican	January 4, 1909 – January 2, 1911	Alameda	
William Carter Clark	Republican	January 2, 1911 – January 6, 1913	Alameda	
Wilber Fisk Chandler	Republican	January 6, 1913 – January 4, 1915	Fresno	
Lorenzo Dow Scott	Republican	January 4, 1915 – August 15, 1915	Fresno	Died in office.
Vacant		August 15, 1915 – January 8, 1917	Fresno	
A. W. Carlson	Republican	January 8, 1917 – January 6, 1919	Fresno	
Byron W. McKeen	Republican	January 6, 1919 – January 8, 1923	Fresno	
Charles Alvin Foster	Republican	January 8, 1923 – January 7, 1929	Fresno	
Maurice S. Meeker	Republican	January 7, 1929 – January 5, 1931	Fresno	
Dan W. Emmett	Republican	January 5, 1931 – January 2, 1933	Venutra	
Frank Wimberly Wright	Republican	January 2, 1933 – January 4, 1937	Los Angeles	
Gerald C. Kepple	Republican	January 4, 1937 – January 4, 1943	Los Angeles	
Thomas M. Erwin	Republican	January 4, 1943 – January 5, 1959	Los Angeles	
Ronald B. Cameron	Democratic	January 5, 1959 – January 3, 1963	Los Angeles	Got elected to Congress for the 25th congressional district.
Phil Soto	Democratic	January 7, 1963 – January 2, 1967	Los Angeles	
William Campbell	Republican	January 2, 1967 – January 8, 1973	Los Angeles	
Joseph B. Montoya	Democratic	January 8, 1973 – November 30, 1974	Los Angeles	
Curtis R. Tucker	Democratic	December 2, 1974 – October 9, 1988	Los Angeles	Died in office.
Vacant		October 9, 1988 – February 9, 1989	Los Angeles	
Curtis R. Tucker, Jr.	Democratic	February 9, 1989 – November 30, 1992	Los Angeles	Sworn in after winning a special election to replace his father's seat after he died.
Martha Escutia	Democratic	December 7, 1992 – November 30, 1998	Los Angeles	
Marco Antonio Firebaugh	Democratic	December 7, 1998 – November 30, 2004	Los Angeles	
Hector De La Torre	Democratic	December 6, 2004 – November 30, 2010	Los Angeles	
Ricardo Lara	Democratic	December 6, 2010 – November 30, 2012	Los Angeles	
Richard Bloom	Democratic	December 3, 2012 – November 30, 2022	Los Angeles	
Eloise Reyes	Democratic	December 5, 2022 – November 30, 2024	San Bernardino	Redistricted after the 2020 census.
Robert Garcia	Democratic	December 2, 2024 – present	San Bernardino	

== Election results (1989–present) ==
=== 2024 ===
2024 California State Assembly 50th district election
Primary election
Party	Candidate	Votes	%
Democratic	Robert Garcia	18,176	42.0
Democratic	Adam Perez	12,557	29.0
Democratic	DeJonae Shaw	12,194	28.1
Republican	Sharon Stein (write-in)	397	0.9
Total votes		43,324	100.0
General election
Democratic	Robert Garcia	77,923	56.4
Democratic	Adam Perez	60,360	43.6
Total votes		138,283	100.0
Democratic hold			

=== 2022 ===
2022 California State Assembly 50th district election
Primary election
Party	Candidate	Votes	%
Democratic	Eloise Reyes (incumbent)	26,540	57.0
Republican	Sheela Stark	18,428	39.6
Libertarian	Rodgir Cohen	1,577	3.4
Total votes		46,545	100.0
General election
Democratic	Eloise Reyes (incumbent)	51,340	56.9
Republican	Sheela Stark	38,851	43.1
Total votes		90,191	100.0
Democratic hold			

=== 2020 ===
2020 California State Assembly 50th district election
Primary election
Party	Candidate	Votes	%
Democratic	Richard Bloom (incumbent)	89,797	78.7
Democratic	Will Hess	16,482	14.5
Democratic	Jim King	7,750	6.8
Total votes		114,029	100.0
General election
Democratic	Richard Bloom (incumbent)	166,503	80.4
Democratic	Will Hess	40,709	19.6
Total votes		207,212	100.0
Democratic hold			

=== 2018 ===
2018 California State Assembly 50th district election
Primary election
Party	Candidate	Votes	%
Democratic	Richard Bloom (incumbent)	79,458	100.0
Total votes		79,458	100.0
General election
Democratic	Richard Bloom (incumbent)	167,428	100.0
Total votes		167,428	100.0
Democratic hold			

=== 2016 ===
2016 California State Assembly 50th district election
Primary election
Party	Candidate	Votes	%
Democratic	Richard Bloom (incumbent)	92,315	79.6
Republican	Matthew Gene Craffey	23,613	20.4
Total votes		115,928	100.0
General election
Democratic	Richard Bloom (incumbent)	158,967	74.6
Republican	Matthew Gene Craffey	54,016	25.4
Total votes		212,983	100.0
Democratic hold			

=== 2014 ===
2014 California State Assembly 50th district election
Primary election
Party	Candidate	Votes	%
Democratic	Richard Bloom (incumbent)	42,322	73.4
Republican	Bradley S. Torgan	15,370	26.6
Total votes		57,692	100.0
General election
Democratic	Richard Bloom (incumbent)	78,093	71.5
Republican	Bradley S. Torgan	31,113	28.5
Total votes		109,206	100.0
Democratic hold			

=== 2012 ===
2012 California State Assembly 50th district election
Primary election
Party	Candidate	Votes	%
Democratic	Betsy Butler (incumbent)	16,084	25.8
Democratic	Richard Bloom	15,947	25.6
Republican	Bradley S. Torgan	15,227	24.4
Democratic	Torie Osborn	15,155	24.3
Total votes		62,413	100.0
General election
Democratic	Richard Bloom	93,445	50.5
Democratic	Betsy Butler (incumbent)	91,740	49.5
Total votes		185,185	100.0
Democratic hold			

=== 2010 ===
2010 California State Assembly 50th district election
Party	Candidate	Votes	%
Democratic	Ricardo Lara	46,676	77.7
Republican	Gladys O. Miller	13,452	22.3
Total votes		60,128	100.0
Democratic hold			

=== 2008 ===
2008 California State Assembly 50th district election
Party	Candidate	Votes	%
Democratic	Hector De La Torre (incumbent)	75,082	100.0
Total votes		75,082	100.0
Democratic hold			

=== 2006 ===
2006 California State Assembly 50th district election
Party	Candidate	Votes	%
Democratic	Hector De La Torre (incumbent)	39,019	77.7
Republican	Gladys Miller	11,210	22.3
Total votes		50,229	100.0
Democratic hold			

=== 2004 ===
2004 California State Assembly 50th district election
Party	Candidate	Votes	%
Democratic	Hector De La Torre	56,827	74.9
Republican	Gladys O. Miller	19,091	25.1
Total votes		75,918	100.0
Democratic hold			

=== 2002 ===
2002 California State Assembly 50th district election
Party	Candidate	Votes	%
Democratic	Marco Antonio Firebaugh (incumbent)	31,281	73.2
Republican	Gladys O. Miller	11,499	26.8
Total votes		42,780	100.0
Democratic hold			

=== 2000 ===
2000 California State Assembly 50th district election
Party	Candidate	Votes	%
Democratic	Marco Antonio Firebaugh (incumbent)	43,736	85.3
Republican	Gladys O. Miller	7,562	14.7
Total votes		51,298	100.0
Democratic hold			

=== 1998 ===
1998 California State Assembly 50th district election
Party	Candidate	Votes	%
Democratic	Marco Antonio Firebaugh	30,592	84.7
Republican	Gladys O. Miller	5,514	15.3
Total votes		36,106	100.0
Democratic hold			

=== 1996 ===
1996 California State Assembly 50th district election
Party	Candidate	Votes	%
Democratic	Martha Escutia (incumbent)	35,312	83.0
Republican	Gladys O. Miller	7,246	17.0
Total votes		42,558	100.0
Democratic hold			

=== 1994 ===
1994 California State Assembly 50th district election
Party	Candidate	Votes	%
Democratic	Martha Escutia (incumbent)	23,842	74.6
Republican	Gladys O. Miller	7,064	22.1
Peace and Freedom	Alma B. Strowiss	1,034	3.2
Total votes		31,940	100.0
Democratic hold			

=== 1992 ===
1992 California State Assembly 50th district election
Party	Candidate	Votes	%
Democratic	Martha Escutia	26,887	75.0
Republican	Gladys O. Miller	8,943	25.0
Total votes		35,830	100.0
Democratic hold			

=== 1990 ===
1990 California State Assembly 50th district election
Party	Candidate	Votes	%
Democratic	Curtis R. Tucker, Jr. (incumbent)	44,235	84.6
Peace and Freedom	Michael L. Long	8,022	15.4
Total votes		52,257	100.0
Democratic hold			

=== 1989 (special) ===
1989 California State Assembly 50th district special election Vacancy resulting from the death of Curtis R. Tucker
Party	Candidate	Votes	%
Democratic	Curtis R. Tucker, Jr.	12,533	70.8
Republican	Mike Davis	3,409	19.3
Democratic	Louis Hall Hale	1,147	6.5
Democratic	Carl McGill	417	2.4
Democratic	Roderick "Rod" Wright	193	1.1
Total votes		17,699	100.0
Democratic hold			

== See also ==
- California State Assembly
- California State Assembly districts
- Districts in California
