= 2018 California Insurance Commissioner election =

- November 6, 2018
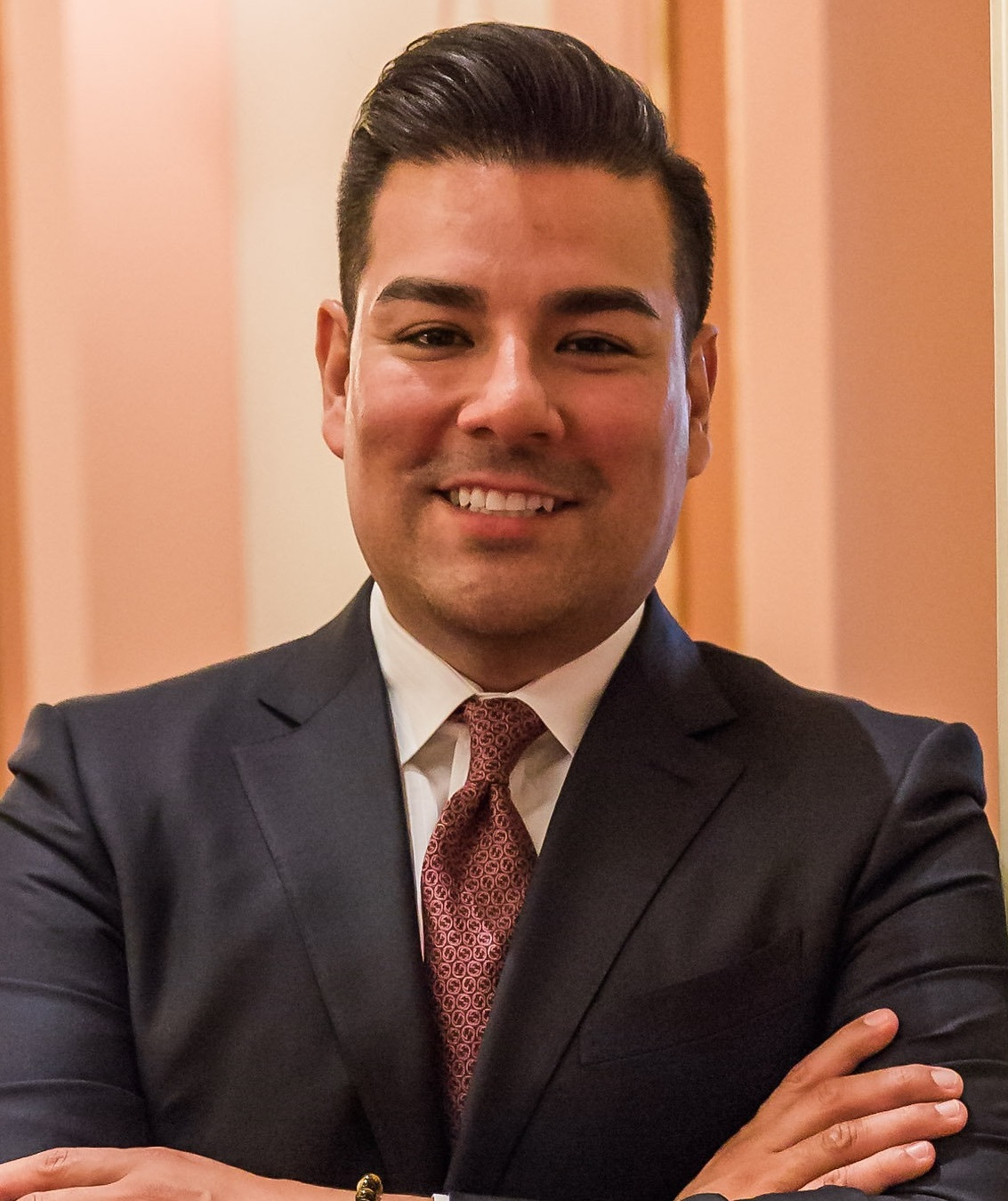

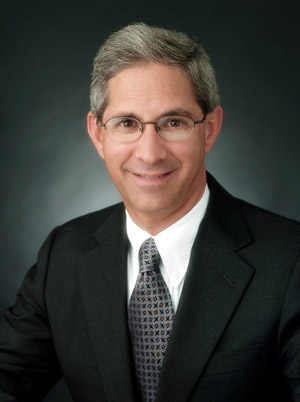
Candidate	Ricardo Lara	Steve Poizner
Party	Democratic	No party preference
Popular vote	6,186,039	5,515,293
Percentage	52.87%	47.13%
- County results Lara: 50–60% 60–70% Poizner: 50–60% 60–70% 70–80%
Commissioner before election
Dave Jones
Democratic
Elected Commissioner
Ricardo Lara
Democratic

The 2018 California Insurance Commissioner election was held on November 6, 2018, to elect the Insurance Commissioner of California. Under California's nonpartisan blanket primary law, all candidates appear on the same ballot, regardless of party. In the primary, voters may vote for any candidate, regardless of their party affiliation. The top two finishers — regardless of party — advance to the general election in November, even if a candidate manages to receive a majority of the votes cast in the primary election.

Incumbent Democratic commissioner Dave Jones was term-limited and could not seek a third term.

== Primary election ==
=== Democratic Party ===
==== Declared ====
- Ricardo Lara, state senator
- Asif Mahmood, pulmonologist

==== Declined ====
- Susan Bonilla, former state assemblywoman
- Tony Mendoza, state senator

=== No party preference ===
==== Declared ====
- Steve Poizner, former Republican California Insurance Commissioner (2007–2011)

=== Peace and Freedom Party ===
==== Declared ====
- Nathalie Hrizi, teacher and 2014 candidate for Insurance Commissioner

=== Endorsements ===
Ricardo Lara (D)

Federal-level officials

- Kamala Harris, U.S. Senator (D-CA)
- Jimmy Gomez, U.S. Representative (D-CA-34)
- Karen Bass, U.S. Representative (D-CA-37)
- Salud Carbajal, U.S. Representative (D-CA-24)
- Ted Lieu, U.S. Representative (D-CA-33)
- Alan Lowenthal, U.S. Representative (D-CA-47)
- Lou Correa, U.S. Representative (D-CA-46)
- Julia Brownley, U.S. Representative (D-CA-26)

State-level Officials

- Jerry Brown, Governor of California
- Kevin de León, President pro tempore of the California State Senate and candidate for United States Senate
- Toni Atkins, President pro tempore of the California State Senate (D-39)
- Robert Hertzberg, California State Senator (D-18)
- Ben Hueso, California State Senator (D-40)
- Tony Mendoza, former California State Senator
- Holly Mitchell, California State Senator (D-30)
- Scott Wiener, California State Senator (D-11)
- Ed Hernandez, California State Senator (D-22)
- Steven Bradford, California State Senator (D-35)
- Hannah-Beth Jackson, California State Senator (D-19)
- Nancy Skinner, California State Senator (D-9)
- Ben Allen, California State Senator (D-26)
- Bill Monning, California State Senator (D-17)
- Henry Stern, California State Senator (D-27)
- Josh Newman, former California State Senator
- Cathleen Galgiani, California State Senator (D-5)
- Bill Dodd, California State Senator (D-3)
- Richard Roth, California State Senator (D-31)
- Jerry Hill, California State Senator (D-13)
- Bob Wieckowski, California State Senator (D-10)
- Mike McGuire, California State Senator (D-2)
- Anthony Portantino, California State Senator (D-25)
- Mark Leno, former California State Senator
- Anthony Rendon, Speaker of the California State Assembly
- Fabian Nunez, former Speaker of the California State Assembly
- John Pérez, former Speaker of the California State Assembly
- Eduardo Garcia, California State Assemblymember (D-56)
- Jacqui Irwin, California State Assemblymember (D-44)
- Blanca Rubio, California State Assemblymember (D-48)
- Miguel Santiago, California State Assemblymember (D-53)
- Lorena Gonzalez-Fletcher, California State Assemblymember (D-80)
- Todd Gloria, California State Assemblymember (D-78)
- Evan Low, California State Assemblymember (D-28)
- Tony Thurmond, California State Assemblymember (D-15)
- Shirley Weber, California State Assemblymember (D-79)
- Kevin McCarty, California State Assemblymember (D-7)
- Reggie Jones-Sawyer, California State Assemblymember (D-59)
- Freddie Rodriguez, California State Assemblymember (D-52)
- David Chiu, California State Assemblymember (D-17)
- Ash Kalra, California State Assemblymember (D-27)
- Monique Limon, California State Assemblymember (D-37)
- Jim Frazier, California State Assemblymember (D-11)
- Kansen Chu, California State Assemblymember (D-25)
- Ed Chau, California State Assemblymember (D-49)
- Chris Holden, California State Assemblymember (D-41)
- Joaquin Arambula, California State Assemblymember (D-31)
- Jim Cooper, California State Assemblymember (D-9)
- Jose Medina, California State Assemblymember (D-61)
- Eloise Reyes, California State Assemblymember (D-47)
- Susan Eggman, California State Assemblymember (D-13)
- Phil Ting, California State Assemblymember (D-19)
- Kevin Mullin, California State Assemblymember (D-22)
- Raul Bocanegra, former California State Assemblymember
- Rudy Salas, California State Assemblymember (D-32)
- Autumn Burke, California State Assemblymember (D-62)
- Bill Quirk, California State Assemblymember (D-20)
- Sebastian Ridley-Thomas, California State Assemblymember (D-54)
- Susan Bonilla, former California State Assemblymember
- Fiona Ma, Chair of the California State Board of Equalization
- Tom Torlakson, California State Superintendent of Public Instruction

Local-level officials

- Robert Garcia, Mayor of Long Beach
- Darrell Steinberg, Mayor of Sacramento
- Eric Garcetti, Mayor of Los Angeles
- Ed Lee, Mayor of San Francisco (deceased)
- Janice Hahn, member of the Los Angeles County Board of Supervisors
- Hilda Solis, member of the Los Angeles County Board of Supervisors

Organizations

- National Union of Healthcare Workers
- California Nurses Association/California Nurses Association/National Nurses United
- UNITE HERE, AFL-CIO
- California Teachers Association
Steve Poizner (NPP)

Newspapers

- Los Angeles Times
- The San Diego Union-Tribune
- The Mercury News
- The East Bay Times
- The San Francisco Chronicle
- The Sacramento Bee
- The Modesto Bee
- The Marin Independent Journal
- Red Bluff Daily News
- The Malibu Times
- The San Luis Obispo Tribune
- The Madera Tribune
- Insurance News Net

International-level officials

- William H. Draper, former Administrator of the U.N. Development Programme

Federal-level officials

- Jim Blew, Assistant Secretary of Education for Planning, Evaluation, and Policy Analysis
- Frank Baxter, former U.S. Ambassador to Uruguay (Republican)
- George P. Shultz, former U.S. Secretary of State (Republican)

State-level officials

- Arnold Schwarzenegger, former Governor of California (Republican)
- John Kasich, Governor of Ohio (Republican)
- Bill Emmerson, former California State Senator (R-23)
- Don Sebastiani, former California State Assemblyman (R-8)

Local-level officials

- Richard J. Riordan, former Mayor of Los Angeles (Republican)
- Carl DeMaio, radio host and former San Diego city councilman (Republican)
- Mark Tseneishi, Torrance traffic commissioner (Republican)
- Bradley Tusk, former spokesperson for the New York City Parks Department

Individuals

- Donald Friese, businessman
- Robert Day, businessman and philanthropist
- Paul Jacobs, businessman
- Bradford M. Freeman, businessman and conservative donor
- Floyd Kvamme, businessman and former advisor to George W. Bush and Pete Wilson (Republican)
- Kelly Roberts, businesswoman, philanthropist, and former advisor to Arnold Schwarzenegger (Republican)
- David Crane, lecturer at Stanford University and president of Govern for California (Democratic)
- Merrill Newman, businessman and veteran
- Malin Burnham, businessman and former sailboat racer
- Eli Broad, entrepreneur and philanthropist
- Sherry Lansing, actress, film studio executive, and philanthropist
- Doug Wick, film producer
- Greg Lucier, businessman
- John Altschuler, film producer and writer
- Robert Shillman, businessman
- James Easton, businessman, philanthropist, and archer
- Robert C. Kagle, businessman
- Howard F. Ahmanson, businessman (Democratic)
- Joseph W. Saunders, chairman of Teach for All
- Larry Sonsini, corporate lawyer and venture capitalist
- David Horowitz, conservative writer
- Paul Haaga, chairman of NPR
- Tom Edmonds, member of the Kern County Republican Central Committee (Republican)
- Franklin P. Johnson, businessman (Republican)
- David Marquardt, venture capitalist
- Michael G. McCaffery, businessman
- Daniel Schnur, former director of communications for Pete Wilson (Republican)
- Jack Dangermond, businessman and environmental scientist
- Samuel Ginn, businessman
- A.C. Markkula, businessman
- Greg Penner, businessman
- Carrie Penner, educator and businesswoman
- Diane Wilsey, socialite and philanthropist
- Jeremy Stoppelman, businessman
- John Sculley, businessman
- Nicholas J. Pritzker, entrepreneur
- Jeffrey Henley, businessman
- Carl Berg, businessman
- Matt Cohler, venture capitalist
- John J. Fisher, businessman (Republican)
- Doris F. Fisher, businesswoman
- William S. Fisher, investor and philanthropist
- Alex Spanos, businessman and majority owner of the Los Angeles Chargers

Organizations

- Unite America
- California Association of Pest Control Advisers
- Sheppard, Mullin, Richter & Hampton
- Sierra Pacific Industries
- American Pistachio Growers of California
- Molina Healthcare
- Prime Healthcare Services
- New Majority
- Family Business PAC
- California Business Properties Association
- Blue Lake Rancheria
- Din Tai Fung
- Lincoln Club of Orange County
- Lincoln Club of Northern California
- Los Angeles County Professional Peace Officers
- California Real Estate PAC
Asif Mahmood (D)

Federal-level officials

- Ted Lieu, U.S. Representative (D-CA-33)
- Judy Chu, U.S. Representative (D-CA-27)
- Brad Sherman, U.S. Representative (D-CA-30)
- Ro Khanna, U.S. Representative (D-CA-17)

State-level officials

- Betty Yee, California State Controller
- Chris Holden, California State Assemblyman (D-41)

Local-level officials

- Michael Tubbs, Mayor of Stockton
- Terry Tornek, Mayor of Pasadena
- David Ryu, Los Angeles City Councilman

Individuals

- Basim Elkarra, activist and California Democratic Party official
Nathalie Hrizi (PFP)

Newspapers

- San Francisco Bay View

=== Polling ===
Poll source	Date(s) administered	Sample size	Ricardo Lara (D)	Asif Mahmood (D)	Steve Poizner (NPP)	Nathalie Hrizi (PFP)	Undecided
Gravis Marketing	May 4–5, 2018	525	18%	7%	26%	6%	43%
Probolsky Research	April 16–18, 2018	900	14%	6%	21%	6%	53%
Sexton Strategies and Research (D-Mahmood)	March 24–27, 2018	800	18%	18%	49%	–	15%

=== Results ===
Results by county Poizner: 30–40%; 40–50%; 50–60%; 60–70%; Lara: 40–50%; 50–60%

Nonpartisan blanket primary results
Party	Candidate	Votes	%
No party preference	Steve Poizner	2,569,254	41.0%
Democratic	Ricardo Lara	2,538,478	40.5%
Democratic	Asif Mahmood	846,023	13.5%
Peace and Freedom	Nathalie Hrizi	316,149	5.0%
Total votes		6,269,904	100%

==== Results by county ====
Primary results by county. Gray represents counties won by Poizner. Blue represents counties won by Lara.

County	Hrizi (PFP)		Lara (D)		Mahmood (D)		Poizner (NPP)	
County	Votes	%	Votes	%	Votes	%	Votes	%
Alameda	17,147	5.8%	133,124	45.0%	58,868	19.9%	86,517	29.3%
Alpine	14	3.9%	148	41.5%	52	14.6%	143	40.1%
Amador	612	5.3%	2,580	22.3%	1,403	12.1%	6,961	60.2%
Butte	3,355	6.9%	14,716	30.3%	6,888	14.2%	23,637	48.6%
Calaveras	763	5.5%	3,100	22.3%	1,665	12.0%	8,373	60.2%
Colusa	177	5.8%	797	26.0%	341	11.1%	1,751	57.1%
Contra Costa	11,081	5.2%	77,385	36.2%	32,203	15.1%	92,885	43.5%
Del Norte	367	7.8%	1,527	32.6%	509	10.9%	2,275	48.6%
El Dorado	2,385	4.8%	12,415	24.9%	6,077	12.2%	28,890	58.1%
Fresno	6,786	5.7%	41,331	35.0%	13,866	11.7%	56,205	47.6%
Glenn	300	6.9%	891	20.5%	411	9.5%	2,741	63.1%
Humboldt	2,052	7.6%	11,995	44.2%	4,734	17.4%	8,383	30.9%
Imperial	808	4.6%	9,841	55.6%	1,547	8.7%	5,488	31.0%
Inyo	346	7.1%	1,541	31.6%	559	11.5%	2,431	49.8%
Kern	5,398	5.1%	30,758	28.8%	8,401	7.9%	62,207	58.3%
Kings	636	4.3%	4,332	29.2%	1,286	8.7%	8,570	57.8%
Lake	758	6.2%	3,749	30.4%	2,148	17.4%	5,658	46.0%
Lassen	497	9.4%	1,186	22.5%	415	7.9%	3,164	60.1%
Los Angeles	61,597	4.7%	697,795	53.6%	167,348	12.8%	375,658	28.8%
Madera	989	4.6%	6,066	28.0%	1,772	8.2%	12,814	58.2%
Marin	2,919	4.0%	31,388	42.6%	12,091	16.4%	27,200	37.0%
Mariposa	332	6.0%	1,440	26.2%	483	8.8%	3,237	58.9%
Mendocino	1,460	7.8%	7,776	41.5%	3,992	21.3%	5,488	29.3%
Merced	1,547	5.4%	11,275	39.3%	2,411	8.4%	13,484	47.0%
Modoc	231	10.1%	474	20.6%	221	9.6	1,372	59.7%
Mono	165	5.6%	1,109	38.0%	372	12.7%	1,276	43.7%
Monterey	2,479	4.5%	30,645	50.9%	5,535	9.2%	21,511	35.8%
Napa	1,439	4.5%	10,671	33.2%	6,464	20.1%	13,554	42.25%
Nevada	1,822	5.5%	9,958	30.0%	6,188	18.6%	15,221	45.9%
Orange	23,160	4.2%	188,970	34.1%	61,759	11.1%	280,356	50.6%
Placer	5,102	5.3%	25,945	26.8%	11,515	11.9%	54,208	56.0%
Plumas	374	6.6%	1,372	24.4%	925	16.4%	2,957	52.5%
Riverside	13,804	4.5%	108,203	35.1%	32,895	10.7%	153,157	49.7%
Sacramento	12,183	4.4%	101,947	36.5%	43,282	15.5%	121,841	43.6%
San Benito	635	5.7%	4,647	42.0%	1,131	10.2%	4,654	42.1%
San Bernardino	12,723	5.0%	90,705	35.7%	26,223	10.3%	124,324	49.0%
San Diego	23,397	3.9%	236,429	39.2%	77,311	12.8%	266,318	44.1%
San Francisco	29,487	14.1%	85,107	40.8%	33,001	15.8%	61,044	29.3%
San Joaquin	5,427	5.5%	34,626	35.3%	13,673	13.9%	44,395	45.2%
San Luis Obispo	3,998	5.2%	25,898	34.0%	9,912	13.0%	36,411	47.8%
San Mateo	6,436	4.2%	63,588	42.0%	25,588	16.9%	55,930	36.9%
Santa Barbara	3,374	4.2%	33,840	42.1%	9,821	12.2%	33,303	41.5%
Santa Clara	12,742	4.0%	122,582	38.2%	54,958	17.1%	130,320	40.6%
Santa Cruz	3,373	5.2%	31,192	48.3%	10,239	15.9%	19,728	30.6%
Shasta	2,626	6.3%	8,153	19.7%	3,593	8.7%	27,077	65.3%
Sierra	108	8.9%	311	25.6%	167	13.8%	627	51.7%
Siskiyou	705	6.9%	2,802	27.6%	1,121	11.0%	5,523	54.4%
Solano	4,310	5.8%	28,514	38.4%	12,225	16.4%	29,277	39.4%
Sonoma	5,550	4.7%	52,719	45.0%	22,399	19.1%	36,463	31.1%
Stanislaus	3,755	4.7%	26,116	32.8%	10,487	13.2%	39,346	49.4%
Sutter	1,187	6.4%	4,277	23.2%	2,694	14.6%	10,258	55.7%
Tehama	1,024	8.0%	2,645	20.7%	1,087	8.5%	8,042	62.8%
Trinity	382	11.1%	1,031	30.0%	490	14.2%	1,536	44.7%
Tulare	2,568	5.1%	16,495	32.4%	3,615	7.1%	28,167	55.4%
Tuolumne	811	5.8%	3,464	24.8%	1,865	13.3%	7,843	56.1%
Ventura	5,875	4.0%	57,286	38.7%	16,715	11.3%	68,059	46.0%
Yolo	1,777	4.3%	17,219	41.5%	7,799	18.8%	14,688	35.4%
Yuba	786	7.3%	2,382	22.2%	1,283	12.0%	6,274	58.5%
Totals	316,149	5.0%	2,538,478	40.5%	846,023	13.5%	2,569,254	41.0%

== General election ==
=== Endorsements ===
Ricardo Lara (D)

Federal-level officials

- Kamala Harris, U.S. Senator (D-CA)
- Jimmy Gomez, U.S. Representative (D-CA-34)
- Karen Bass, U.S. Representative (D-CA-37)
- Salud Carbajal, U.S. Representative (D-CA-24)
- Ted Lieu, U.S. Representative (D-CA-33)
- Alan Lowenthal, U.S. Representative (D-CA-47)
- Lou Correa, U.S. Representative (D-CA-46)
- Julia Brownley, U.S. Representative (D-CA-26)

State-level Officials

- Jerry Brown, Governor of California
- Kevin de León, President pro tempore of the California State Senate and candidate for United States Senate
- Toni Atkins, President pro tempore of the California State Senate (D-39)
- Robert Hertzberg, California State Senator (D-18)
- Ben Hueso, California State Senator (D-40)
- Tony Mendoza, former California State Senator
- Holly Mitchell, California State Senator (D-30)
- Scott Wiener, California State Senator (D-11)
- Ed Hernandez, California State Senator (D-22)
- Steven Bradford, California State Senator (D-35)
- Hannah-Beth Jackson, California State Senator (D-19)
- Nancy Skinner, California State Senator (D-9)
- Ben Allen, California State Senator (D-26)
- Bill Monning, California State Senator (D-17)
- Henry Stern, California State Senator (D-27)
- Josh Newman, former California State Senator
- Cathleen Galgiani, California State Senator (D-5)
- Bill Dodd, California State Senator (D-3)
- Richard Roth, California State Senator (D-31)
- Jerry Hill, California State Senator (D-13)
- Bob Wieckowski, California State Senator (D-10)
- Mike McGuire, California State Senator (D-2)
- Anthony Portantino, California State Senator (D-25)
- Mark Leno, former California State Senator
- Anthony Rendon, Speaker of the California State Assembly
- Fabian Nunez, former Speaker of the California State Assembly
- John Pérez, former Speaker of the California State Assembly
- Eduardo Garcia, California State Assemblymember (D-56)
- Jacqui Irwin, California State Assemblymember (D-44)
- Blanca Rubio, California State Assemblymember (D-48)
- Miguel Santiago, California State Assemblymember (D-53)
- Lorena Gonzalez-Fletcher, California State Assemblymember (D-80)
- Todd Gloria, California State Assemblymember (D-78)
- Evan Low, California State Assemblymember (D-28)
- Tony Thurmond, California State Assemblymember (D-15)
- Shirley Weber, California State Assemblymember (D-79)
- Kevin McCarty, California State Assemblymember (D-7)
- Reggie Jones-Sawyer, California State Assemblymember (D-59)
- Freddie Rodriguez, California State Assemblymember (D-52)
- David Chiu, California State Assemblymember (D-17)
- Ash Kalra, California State Assemblymember (D-27)
- Monique Limon, California State Assemblymember (D-37)
- Jim Frazier, California State Assemblymember (D-11)
- Kansen Chu, California State Assemblymember (D-25)
- Ed Chau, California State Assemblymember (D-49)
- Chris Holden, California State Assemblymember (D-41)
- Joaquin Arambula, California State Assemblymember (D-31)
- Jim Cooper, California State Assemblymember (D-9)
- Jose Medina, California State Assemblymember (D-61)
- Eloise Reyes, California State Assemblymember (D-47)
- Susan Eggman, California State Assemblymember (D-13)
- Phil Ting, California State Assemblymember (D-19)
- Kevin Mullin, California State Assemblymember (D-22)
- Raul Bocanegra, former California State Assemblymember
- Rudy Salas, California State Assemblymember (D-32)
- Autumn Burke, California State Assemblymember (D-62)
- Bill Quirk, California State Assemblymember (D-20)
- Sebastian Ridley-Thomas, California State Assemblymember (D-54)
- Susan Bonilla, former California State Assemblymember
- Fiona Ma, Chair of the California State Board of Equalization
- Tom Torlakson, California State Superintendent of Public Instruction

Local-level officials

- Robert Garcia, Mayor of Long Beach
- Darrell Steinberg, Mayor of Sacramento
- Eric Garcetti, Mayor of Los Angeles
- Ed Lee, Mayor of San Francisco (deceased)
- Janice Hahn, member of the Los Angeles County Board of Supervisors
- Hilda Solis, member of the Los Angeles County Board of Supervisors

Organizations

- National Union of Healthcare Workers
- California Nurses Association/California Nurses Association/National Nurses United
- UNITE HERE, AFL-CIO
- California Teachers Association
Steve Poizner (NPP)

Newspapers

- Los Angeles Times
- The San Diego Union-Tribune
- The Mercury News
- The East Bay Times
- The San Francisco Chronicle
- The Sacramento Bee
- The Modesto Bee
- The Marin Independent Journal
- Red Bluff Daily News
- The Malibu Times
- The San Luis Obispo Tribune
- The Madera Tribune
- Insurance News Net

International-level officials

- William H. Draper, former Administrator of the U.N. Development Programme

Federal-level officials

- Jim Blew, Assistant Secretary of Education for Planning, Evaluation, and Policy Analysis
- Frank Baxter, former U.S. Ambassador to Uruguay (Republican)
- George P. Shultz, former U.S. Secretary of State (Republican)

State-level officials

- John Kasich, Governor of Ohio (Republican)
- Bill Emmerson, former California State Senator (R-23)
- Don Sebastiani, former California State Assemblyman (R-8)

Local-level officials

- Richard J. Riordan, former Mayor of Los Angeles (Republican)
- Carl DeMaio, radio host and former San Diego city councilman (Republican)
- Mark Tseneishi, Torrance traffic commissioner (Republican)
- Bradley Tusk, former spokesperson for the New York City Parks Department

Individuals

- Donald Friese, businessman
- Robert Day, businessman and philanthropist
- Paul Jacobs, businessman
- Bradford M. Freeman, businessman and conservative donor
- Floyd Kvamme, businessman and former advisor to George W. Bush and Pete Wilson (Republican)
- Kelly Roberts, businesswoman, philanthropist, and former advisor to Arnold Schwarzenegger (Republican)
- David Crane, lecturer at Stanford University and president of Govern for California (Democratic)
- Merrill Newman, businessman and veteran
- Malin Burnham, businessman and former sailboat racer
- Eli Broad, entrepreneur and philanthropist
- Sherry Lansing, actress, film studio executive, and philanthropist
- Doug Wick, film producer
- Greg Lucier, businessman
- John Altschuler, film producer and writer
- Robert Shillman, businessman
- James Easton, businessman, philanthropist, and archer
- Robert C. Kagle, businessman
- Howard F. Ahmanson, businessman (Democratic)
- Joseph W. Saunders, chairman of Teach for All
- Larry Sonsini, corporate lawyer and venture capitalist
- David Horowitz, conservative writer
- Paul Haaga, chairman of NPR
- Tom Edmonds, member of the Kern County Republican Central Committee (Republican)
- Franklin P. Johnson, businessman (Republican)
- David Marquardt, venture capitalist
- Michael G. McCaffery, businessman
- Daniel Schnur, former director of communications for Pete Wilson (Republican)
- Jack Dangermond, businessman and environmental scientist
- Samuel Ginn, businessman
- A.C. Markkula, businessman
- Greg Penner, businessman
- Carrie Penner, educator and businesswoman
- Diane Wilsey, socialite and philanthropist
- Jeremy Stoppelman, businessman
- John Sculley, businessman
- Nicholas J. Pritzker, entrepreneur
- Jeffrey Henley, businessman
- Carl Berg, businessman
- Matt Cohler, venture capitalist
- John J. Fisher, businessman (Republican)
- Doris F. Fisher, businesswoman
- William S. Fisher, investor and philanthropist
- Alex Spanos, businessman and majority owner of the Los Angeles Chargers
- John H. Cox, businessman and candidate for Governor of California (Republican)

Organizations

- Unite America
- California Association of Pest Control Advisers
- Sheppard, Mullin, Richter & Hampton
- Sierra Pacific Industries
- American Pistachio Growers of California
- Molina Healthcare
- Prime Healthcare Services
- New Majority
- Family Business PAC
- California Business Properties Association
- Blue Lake Rancheria
- Din Tai Fung
- Lincoln Club of Orange County
- Lincoln Club of Northern California
- Los Angeles County Professional Peace Officers
- California Real Estate PAC

=== Polling ===
Poll source	Date(s) administered	Sample size	Margin of error	Ricardo Lara (D)	Steve Poizner (NPP)	Undecided
Thomas Partners Strategies	October 25–27, 2018	1,068	± 3.5%	44%	45%	11%
UC Berkeley	October 19–26, 2018	1,339	± 4.0%	44%	49%	7%
Thomas Partners Strategies	October 12–14, 2018	1,068	± 3.5%	39%	47%	15%
Thomas Partners Strategies	September 28–30, 2018	1,068	± 3.5%	37%	45%	15%
Thomas Partners Strategies	September 21–23, 2018	1,068	± 3.5%	40%	45%	15%
Thomas Partners Strategies	September 14–16, 2018	1,040	± 3.5%	27%	34%	40%
Thomas Partners Strategies	September 7–9, 2018	1,227	± 3.3%	27%	34%	39%

=== Results ===
2018 California Insurance Commissioner election
Party	Candidate	Votes	%
Democratic	Ricardo Lara	6,186,039	52.87%
No party preference	Steve Poizner	5,515,293	47.13%
Total votes		11,701,332	100.00%
Democratic hold			

==== By county ====
Blue represents counties won by Lara. Gray represents counties won by Poizner.

County	Lara (DEM)		Poizner (NPP)		Margin		Total
County	Votes	%	Votes	%	Votes	%	Votes
Alameda	357,818	65.66%	187,132	34.34%	170,686	31.32%	492,582
Alpine	306	52.22%	280	47.78%	26	4.44%	586
Amador	4,788	29.32%	11,540	70.68%	-6,752	-41.35%	16,328
Butte	34,184	41.62%	47,948	58.38%	-13,764	-16.76%	82,132
Calaveras	5,972	30.08%	13,885	69.92%	-7,913	-39.85%	19,857
Colusa	1,970	37.38%	3,300	62.62%	-1,330	-25.24%	5,270
Contra Costa	208,059	52.70%	186,774	47.30%	21,285	5.39%	394,833
Del Norte	3,034	38.08%	4,933	61.92%	-1,899	-23.84%	7,967
El Dorado	27,875	34.03%	54,028	65.97%	-26,153	-31.93%	81,903
Fresno	114,451	48.47%	121,672	51.53%	-7,221	-3.06%	236,123
Glenn	2,304	30.26%	5,310	69.74%	-3,006	-39.48%	7,614
Humboldt	27,569	55.90%	21,749	44.10%	5,820	11.80%	49,318
Imperial	21,133	65.51%	11,124	34.49%	10,009	31.03%	32,257
Inyo	2,546	38.02%	4,151	61.98%	-1,605	-23.97%	6,697
Kern	73,374	38.00%	119,708	62.00%	-46,334	-24.00%	193,082
Kings	11,528	40.74%	16,768	59.26%	-5,240	-18.52%	28,296
Lake	8,792	43.86%	11,252	56.14%	-2,460	-12.27%	20,044
Lassen	2,037	24.79%	6,181	75.21%	-4,144	-50.43%	8,218
Los Angeles	1,709,475	62.11%	1,042,980	37.89%	666,495	24.21%	2,752,455
Madera	13,646	37.61%	22,637	62.39%	-8,991	-24.78%	36,283
Marin	70,705	58.56%	50,044	41.44%	20,661	17.11%	120,749
Mariposa	2,553	33.22%	5,131	66.78%	-2,578	-33.55%	7,684
Mendocino	17,796	56.72%	13,578	43.28%	4,218	13.44%	31,374
Merced	28,328	50.63%	27,621	49.37%	707	1.26%	55,949
Modoc	796	25.97%	2,269	74.03%	-1,473	-48.06%	3,065
Mono	2,045	45.25%	2,474	54.75%	-429	-9.49%	4,519
Monterey	65,588	58.71%	46,118	41.29%	19,470	17.43%	111,706
Napa	27,665	51.83%	25,715	48.17%	1,950	3.65%	53,380
Nevada	22,325	44.17%	28,218	55.83%	-5,893	-11.66%	50,543
Orange	433,457	42.85%	578,049	57.15%	-144,592	-14.29%	1,011,506
Placer	54,087	33.56%	107,081	66.44%	-52,994	-32.88%	161,168
Plumas	2,869	35.03%	5,321	64.97%	-2,452	-29.94%	8,190
Riverside	280,173	46.42%	323,451	53.58%	-43,278	-7.17%	603,624
Sacramento	236,345	48.66%	249,392	51.34%	-13,047	-2.69%	485,737
San Benito	9,996	52.02%	9,220	47.98%	776	4.04%	19,216
San Bernardino	241,678	47.08%	271,672	52.92%	-29,994	-5.84%	513,350
San Diego	541,730	50.67%	527,455	49.33%	14,275	1.34%	1,069,185
San Francisco	235,299	69.68%	102,364	30.32%	132,935	39.37%	337,663
San Joaquin	90,069	48.88%	94,211	51.12%	-4,142	-2.25%	184,280
San Luis Obispo	50,150	42.91%	66,713	57.09%	-16,563	-14.17%	116,863
San Mateo	151,908	56.32%	117,836	43.68%	34,072	12.63%	269,744
Santa Barbara	77,372	53.18%	68,116	46.82%	9,256	6.36%	145,488
Santa Clara	315,504	54.25%	266,065	45.75%	49,439	8.50%	581,569
Santa Cruz	71,808	63.91%	40,550	36.09%	31,258	27.82%	112,358
Shasta	17,535	26.80%	47,903	73.20%	-30,368	-46.41%	65,438
Sierra	491	31.58%	1,064	68.42%	-573	-36.85%	1,555
Siskiyou	5,978	35.32%	10,949	64.68%	-4,971	-29.37%	16,927
Solano	74,590	53.46%	64,939	46.54%	9,651	6.92%	139,529
Sonoma	115,375	57.78%	84,305	42.22%	31,070	15.56%	199,680
Stanislaus	65,754	44.54%	81,860	55.46%	-16,106	-10.91%	147,614
Sutter	9,735	35.09%	18,008	64.91%	-8,273	-29.82%	27,743
Tehama	5,437	28.13%	13,890	71.87%	-8,453	-43.74%	19,327
Trinity	1,957	39.72%	2,970	60.28%	-1,013	-20.56%	4,927
Tulare	38,610	41.16%	55,188	58.84%	-16,578	-17.67%	93,798
Tuolumne	7,184	33.00%	14,587	67.00%	-7,403	-34.00%	21,771
Ventura	137,538	47.05%	154,760	52.95%	-17,222	-5.89%	292,298
Yolo	38,616	55.43%	31,052	44.57%	7,564	10.86%	69,668
Yuba	6,132	34.19%	11,802	65.81%	-5,670	-31.62%	17,934
Totals	6,186,039	52.87%	5,515,293	47.13%	670,746	5.73%	11,701,332
