= Sobrato Center =

Athletic venue in California, US

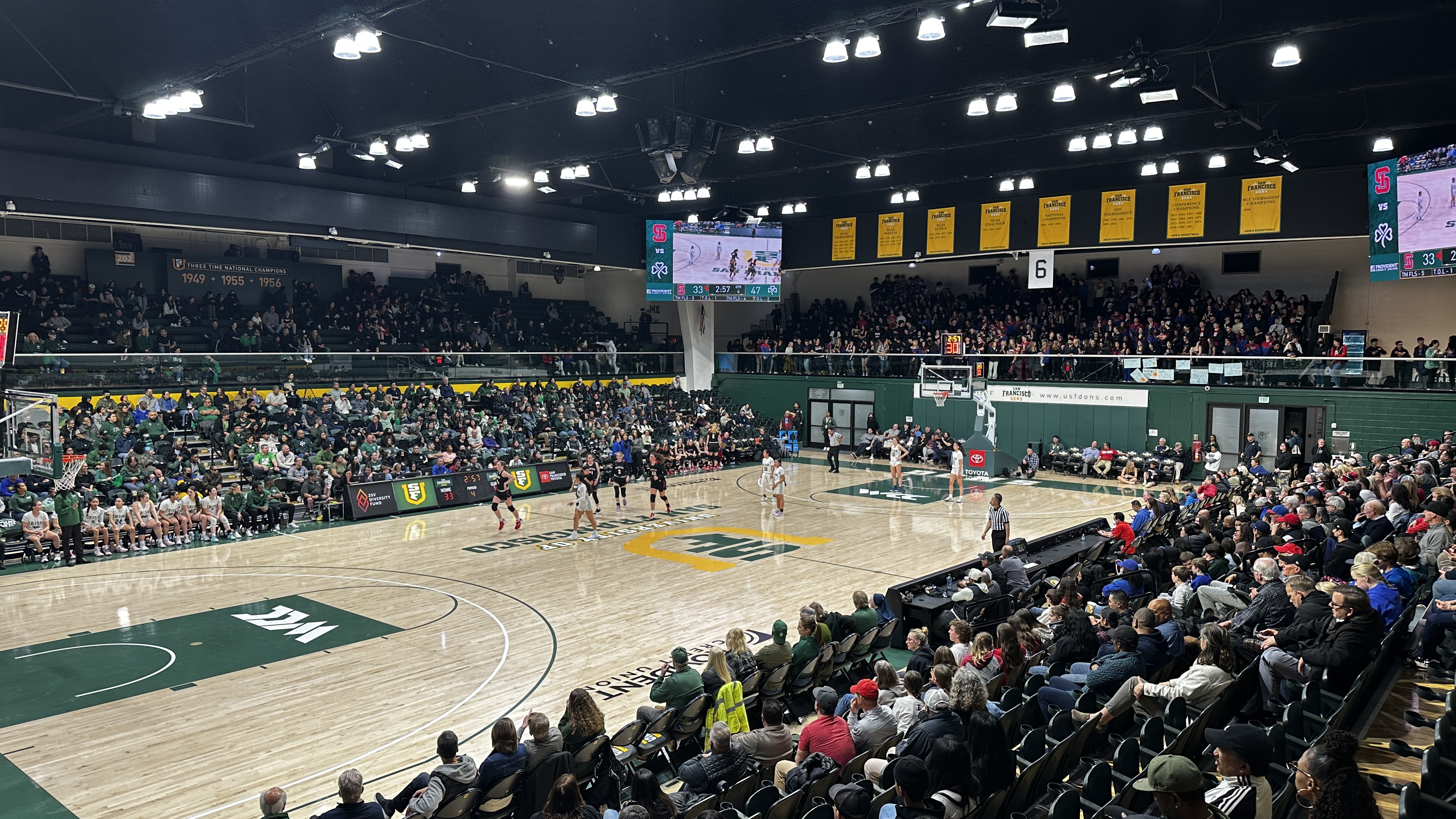
- Interactive map of Sobrato Center
- Location: 2335 Golden Gate Avenue, San Francisco, California 94118
- Coordinates: 37°46′37″N 122°26′58″W
- Owner: University of San Francisco
- Operator: University of San Francisco
- Capacity: 3,005

Construction
- Opened: 1958

Tenant
- San Francisco Dons (NCAA) (1958–present)

The Sobrato Center in San Francisco, California, is an athletic venue on the University of San Francisco (USF) campus. It contains War Memorial Gymnasium and serves as home for the San Francisco men's and women's basketball teams as well as the women's volleyball team. It also houses athletic department offices and training facilities for the university's other athletic teams. It is currently the oldest basketball venue in the West Coast Conference. It is popularly known as "The Hilltop" because of USF's position on the summit of Lone Mountain. On some occasions, St. Ignatius College Preparatory hosts their basketball games here as well.

== History ==
Prior to 1958, the USF basketball team had no permanent home. During the 1955 and 1956 NCAA championship seasons, Phil Woolpert's teams had to practice and play home games at either nearby Kezar Pavilion in Golden Gate Park or the gym at neighboring St. Ignatius High School. The aftermath of USF's back-to-back national championships spurred a fund-raising effort that ultimately made building an on-campus venue possible and in 1958, War Memorial Gym opened its doors.

Originally serving all of USF's athletic needs, War Memorial Gym also hosted occasional games for the San Francisco Warriors from 1962 to 1967. Upon the arrival of women's sports on campus, War Memorial Gym also became the home of the women's basketball and volleyball teams. Though the gym missed the Russell and Jones era by three years, it was the home of the great Dons teams of the late 1970s led by Bill Cartwright, Phil Smith and Quintin Dailey (though some high-profile matches were held at the Cow Palace or the Oakland Arena). In 1989, with the construction of the Koret Health and Recreation Center, War Memorial became exclusively an athletic venue, though most student-athlete training facilities continue to be housed in the Moran Center beneath the gym.

Dedicated to the USF alumni killed in action in war, the War Memorial Gym currently seats 3,005 spectators. Above the court can be seen banners commemorating USF's national and conference championships in basketball, including titles won by the women's basketball team in their old conference, the Northern California Athletic Conference. Players' retired numbers can also be found, including banners for Pete Newell and Phil Woolpert. The gym's foyer houses a mini-hall of fame, displaying trophies and memorabilia from USF's athletic history.

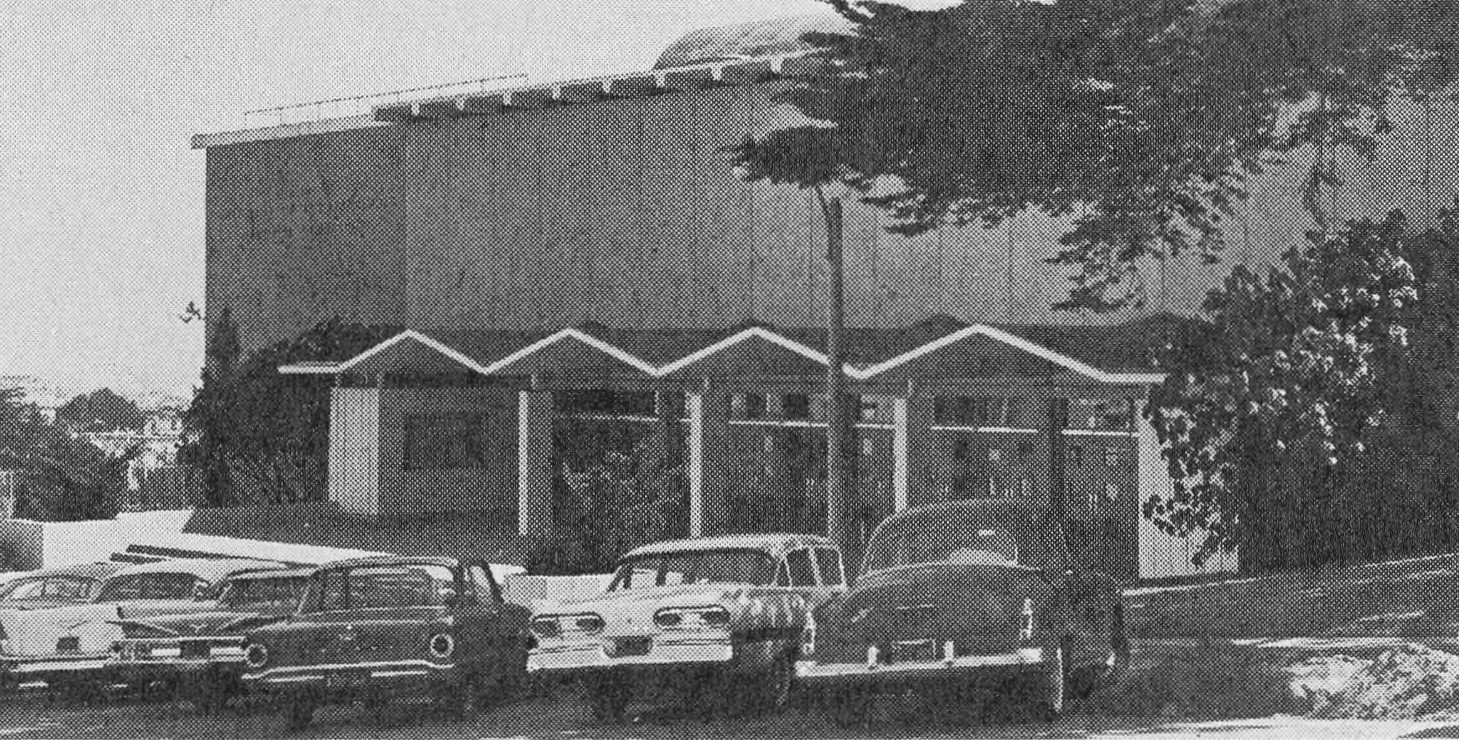
The exterior of War Memorial Gymnasium, circa 1964

The 1998 episode of Teletubbies entitled, "Basketball", was filmed at the Sobrato Center where Phil Mathews and his son, Jordan were featured in a segment playing basketball.

In 2008 and 2009, USF made upgrades to the gym. The old floor, which was the original installation, was replaced, along with the bleacher seating in the upper level. The old baskets were replaced with stand-alone versions, and new banners were installed.

In 2015, it was announced that over a span of three to four years, another series of renovations would be made once again to the gym, mostly taking place during the basketball teams' offseason periods. This $15 million project is funded by Silicon Valley businesspersons John and Susan Sobrato, thus bearing the namesake for the gym and its practice facilities. A club level was introduced with seating near the University Center, restrooms were remodeled, and an elevator was installed while improving the seismic integrity of the building. A museum of USF's athletic history tied with its Jesuit Catholic values will be added with the project. Renovations over the summer of 2019 included the installation of four Daktronics video boards in each corner of the facility. On November 9, 2019, the USF Dons defeated the Princeton Tigers 82–72 in the first college basketball game ever played at the Chase Center.

War Memorial Gym was also the site of CBS's first national college basketball broadcast, a 1982 match-up between USF and the University of Georgia. It hosted the 1987, 1989, and 1993 West Coast Conference men's basketball tournaments.

== See also ==
- List of NCAA Division I basketball arenas
