= Hamid Moghadam =

Iranian and American business executive, philanthropist (born 1956)

Hamid R. Moghadam
- حمید مقدم
- Born: August 26, 1956 (age 70); Tehran, Imperial State of Iran
- Education: Massachusetts Institute of Technology (SB; SM); Stanford University (MBA)
- Occupations: Chairman and CEO of Prologis
- Years active: 1980s–present
- Board member of: Stanford Management Company; Stanford Graduate School of Business
- Website: Prologis profile

Hamid R. Moghadam (Persian: حمید مقدم; born August 26, 1956) is an Iranian and American business executive and philanthropist. In 2011, Moghadam orchestrated the combination between AMB, a firm he co-founded in 1983, and ProLogis to create Prologis, the largest logistics real estate company in the world. Moghadam currently serves as Prologis Chairman with Prologis operating as a global logistics real estate investment trust (REIT) and S&P 100 company.

== Early life and education ==
Born on August 26, 1956, in Tehran, Imperial State of Iran. He grew up in Tehran, where his father was a businessman. In 1969 he attended Aiglon College in Switzerland.

In 1973, he entered the Massachusetts Institute of Technology, where he received Bachelor and Master of Science degrees in engineering. In 1980 Moghadam received an MBA from the Stanford Graduate School of Business in California.

== Career ==
=== Abbey, Moghadam & Company ===
After business school, Moghadam started his career at Homestake Mining Company. He later joined John McMahan Associates. In 1983, he and Douglas Abbey founded Abbey, Moghadam & Company in San Francisco, California. Although they planned to provide investment advisory services, according to Forbes, they soon became known for instead "helping investors revive underperforming assets." They were joined by T. Robert Burke in 1984 and established AMB Institutional Realty Advisors, later named AMB Property Corp., with initial investments in office, industrial and community shopping centers.

=== Going public with AMB ===
In the late 1980s, AMB changed its investment strategy to focus on industrial parks and shopping centers in infill trade areas, with the company beginning to exit the office market in 1987. During the collapse of the office building market in the late 1980s, this shift in assets helped the company avoid significant financial repercussions. AMB launched its first private equity fund in 1989, which focused on industrial and retail properties. AMB consolidated several of its investment funds in 1997 and went public as an REIT. In late 1997, AMB closed its IPO with more than US$2.8 billion in assets.

Throughout 1999, Moghadam "made a series of moves that pared the company of most of its retail holdings, following the notion that e-commerce would become the high-margin road of the future." Selling its retail business around 1999 to focus solely on the industrial sector, starting that year AMB sold nearly $1 billion in retail assets to institutional investors and reallocated funds into warehouses in and around major consumption areas. By the end of 1999, AMB was the second-largest industrially focused REIT in the United States, with a total market capitalization of $3.5 billion. President and CEO of AMB Property Corporation, he became AMB chairman in 2000. AMB made its first overseas investment in 2002, developing a facility for Procter & Gamble in Mexico City. In 2002, AMB initiated an international expansion program focused on buying and developing distribution facilities near global trade hubs, particularly in growth markets such as Latin America, Asia, and Europe. AMB added an internal development division in 2004.

=== Prologis ===
In 2011 Moghadam arranged the combination between AMB and ProLogis to create Prologis, the largest logistics real estate company in the world. With a market cap of approximately $24 billion and corporate headquarters remaining in California, the new Prologis had around $46 billion in assets under management (AUM) and clients such as DHL, Home Depot, Unilever, and FedEx. ProLogis CEO Walter Rakowich and Moghadam were appointed as the new company's co-CEOs, with Moghadam becoming the sole CEO at the start of 2013. He oversaw IPOs in Japan in 2013 and Mexico in 2014.

Prologis continues to operate as a publicly traded real estate investment trust (REIT) on the S&P 100, operating logistics and distribution facilities for customers in various industries in the Americas, Europe, and Asia. In 2018 he oversaw its acquisition of DCT Industrial Trust for $8.4 billion, and in 2020, acquisitions of Liberty Property Trust for $13 billion and Industrial Property Trust for $4 billion, then Duke Realty in 2022 for $23 billion. The company's platform totals 1.2 billion square feet that is owned, managed or under development in 19 countries, with about $196 billion in assets under management. Moghadam frequently appears on major television networks to talk about the real estate industry, including CNBC, Bloomberg TV, and Fox Business Network, as a real estate industry expert.

In 2023, Moghadam's total compensation from Prologis was $50.9 million, representing a CEO-to-median worker pay ratio of 400-to-1 for that year.

== Industry boards and committees ==
In the 1990s, he joined the MIT Center for Real Estate's advisory committee, and became a founding member of The Real Estate Roundtable as vice chairman of the National Realty Committee. He is a member of the national Business Roundtable, and served as a trustee of the Urban Land Institute, joining the executive committee of its board of directors. He was also the chairman of National Association of Real Estate Investment Trusts (NAREIT) in 2004.

== Philanthropy ==
Moghadam has served on various philanthropic and community boards in the San Francisco Bay Area. He served on the boards of Town School for Boys, the California Academy of Sciences, and the Bay Area Discovery Museum, and he was chairman of the Young Presidents' Organization's Northern California chapter.

Previously a trustee of Stanford University, Moghadam is currently a board member of the Stanford Management Company, and was its former chairman. He and his wife established the Moghadam Family Professorship in the Stanford Graduate School of Business, where he serves on the advisory council, after endowing the Stanford Hamid and Christina Moghadam Program in Iranian Studies in 2006, which focuses on undergraduate courses related to Iran.

== Awards and recognition ==
Moghadam was named EY's 1998 Real Estate Award Winner for the Northern California Region. In 2005, Moghadam was presented with an Industry Leadership Award from the National Association of Real Estate Investment Trusts (NAREIT). He received a Lifetime of Building Award from the Commercial Real Estate Development Association (NAIOP) in 2007, and also that year he received the Wisconsin Alumni Center's Vision Setter Award. Moghadam received the EY National Entrepreneur of the Year Overall Award in 2013, as well as the Ellis Island Medal of Honor from the National Ethnic Coalition of Organizations Foundations, Inc. (NECO). Harvard Business Review named him one of the 100 Best-Performing CEOs in the World three times, and a number of industry publications have named him their CEO of the Year.

== Personal life ==
Moghadam and his wife Christina have a son together. In American politics, as of 2016, Moghadam had endorsed both Republicans and Democrats.

In July 2022, Moghdam was robbed at gunpoint outside his home in San Francisco. He relocated to Las Vegas, Nevada in 2025.
