= WSGR =

WSGR may refer to:

- WSGR (FM), a radio station (88.3 FM) licensed to serve New Boston, Ohio, United States
- WRSX, a radio station (91.3 FM) licensed to serve Port Huron, Michigan, United States, which held the call sign WSGR-FM from 1970 to 2018
- WSGR (AM), a radio station licensed to serve Athens, Ohio, United States
- Wilson Sonsini Goodrich & Rosati, an American international law firm headquartered in Palo Alto, California
