= Stanford Shopping Center =

Shopping mall in Palo Alto, California

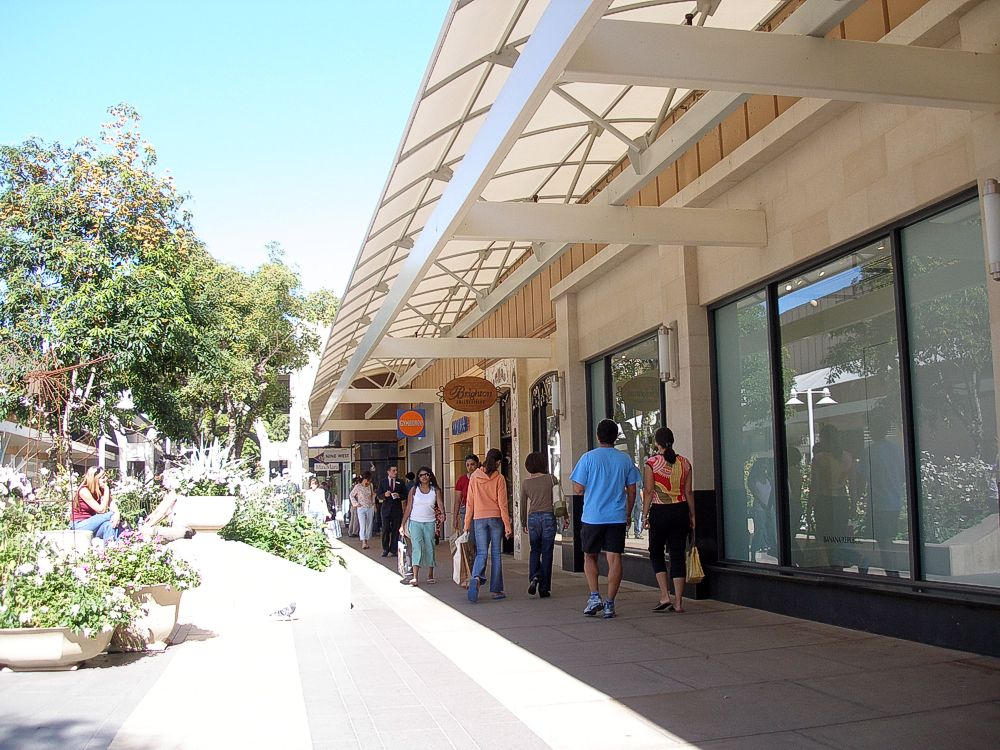
- Walkway at Stanford Shopping Center
- Location: Palo Alto, California
- Coordinates: 37°26′35″N 122°10′16″W
- Opened: 1955
- Developer: Stanford University
- Manager: Simon Property Group
- Owner: Simon Property Group (94.4%)
- Num. of stores: 152
- Num. of anchor tenants: 4
- Floor area: 1,347,935 sq ft (125,227.3 m^{2}) (GLA)
- Floors: 1
- Public transit: Stanford Marguerite Shuttle: MC, X and SE; Menlo Park shuttle: M1; Caltrain: Palo Alto station VTA: 22, 522; Dumbarton Express
- Website: www.stanfordshop.com

Stanford Shopping Center is an upscale open air shopping mall located on Route 82 (El Camino Real) at Sand Hill Road in Palo Alto, California. It is on the campus of Stanford University although the university only owns the land and not the actual buildings or stores. Also, unlike the main academic campus, the shopping center and the neighboring Stanford University Medical Center are part of the city of Palo Alto, not the census-designated place (CDP) of Stanford, California. The shopping center buildings are 94.4% owned by Simon Property Group, which manages the property and leases the land from the university.

The outdoor center is 1,347,935 square feet (125,227.3 square meters) and includes four major department stores: Bloomingdale's, Macy's, Neiman Marcus, and Nordstrom. Retailers at the shopping center include Louis Vuitton, Tiffany & Co., Burberry, Ermenegildo Zegna, and Frette, as well as the first Victoria's Secret retail store.

== History ==
In 1954, excavators broke ground on what was once Leland Stanford's vineyards. Nine buildings housing 45 businesses were built. The Roos Brothers clothing store opened as the first retailer in September 1955 and Blum's restaurant opened on October 22, 1956, marking the completion of the center. Board of trustees Chair Lloyd Dinkelspiel and university President J. E. Wallace Sterling presided at the opening and Shirley Temple Black cut the first slice of a nine-tiered cake. San Francisco department store The Emporium and luxury specialty department store I. Magnin & Co. were the original anchors.

Macy's California joined the center in 1961 and Saks Fifth Avenue opened a store in 1962. Further expansion came again in 1972 with the addition of Los Angeles-based Bullock's, owned by Bloomingdale's parent company Federated Department Stores. Bullock's only lasted 11 years, closing its northern California stores in 1983 and selling its Stanford location to Nordstrom, which opened in November 1984. Neiman Marcus became the sixth anchor in August 1985.

A department store shuffle occurred in the mid-1990s:

- Saks Fifth Avenue closed in 1994.
- I. Magnin was rebranded as a Macy's Men's store in 1995.
- The Emporium store was shuttered and rebranded as Bloomingdale's in November 1996.

In 1997, the vacant Saks Fifth Avenue building was split into two tenants: Crate & Barrel and an Andronico's gourmet market. Andronico's closed in 2011, and was replaced by The Container Store in 2013.

Throughout the years, the center has continued to evolve in terms of both tenants and construction and was managed by the university through its investment affiliate Stanford Management Company since 1991. However, in 2003, taking advantage of the high prices that shopping centers were fetching, the university's board of trustees agreed to sell the center for $333 million to Simon Property Group which, in turn, leases the underlying land from the university under a 51-year lease. The university's lease includes an annual rent equal to 25% percent of the center's net profits.

In 2012, Bloomingdale's announced plans to move into a new three-level 120,000 square foot store, vacating its existing building. The new Bloomingdale's opened in 2014, and the original building was demolished to make way for a new wing of retailers. That new wing, anchored by a multi-level Anthropologie store and a True Food Kitchen restaurant, opened in mid-2016.

In early 2019, Simon Property Group submitted plans to the city of Palo Alto to tear down the former Macy's Men's building and replace it with a 40,000 square-foot, three-level RH gallery with a rooftop restaurant, a duo of smaller restaurant buildings, and a new, larger 29,000 square-foot Wilkes Bashford store. The project was approved in late 2019, with demolition commencing in 2021 and continuing into 2021.

On March 18, 2020, Stanford was among 7 Bay-area malls owned by the Simon Property Group which closed until March 29, 2020 due to the COVID-19 pandemic.
