= Larry Sonsini =

American lawyer

- Born: c. 1941 (age 84–85); Rome, New York, U.S.
- Education: University of California, Berkeley (BA, JD)
- Children: 3

Lawrence William Sonsini (born c. 1941) is an American lawyer and founding partner of Wilson Sonsini Goodrich & Rosati, an international law firm in business and intellectual property law. In 2021, Sonsini was chosen to serve as chair of the board of trustees at Santa Clara University.

== Early life and education ==
Sonsini was born to Lawrence and Mary Sonsini, and moved from Rome, New York, to California in 1949, when Sonsini was eight years old. The family ultimately settled in Van Nuys. In high school, Sonsini played on his school's football team.

Sonsini received his B.A. degree in political science from the University of California, Berkeley, in 1963. Sonsini studied law at the University of California, Berkeley School of Law, where he graduated and received his J.D. degree from in 1966. During law school, Sonsini became interested in business law, and had initially planned to move to New York City to pursue his career. He ultimately chose to stay in Northern California on the advice of his securities law professor.

== Career ==
Sonsini started out counseling semiconductor companies including Cypress Semiconductor, National Semiconductor and LSI Logic. He later counseled hardware firms such as Sun Microsystems, Apple Computer, Silicon Graphics and Seagate Technology and software companies such as Novell, Sybase, WordPerfect and VMware. He has also worked for Google, Netscape and YouTube. He has served as an advisor to many of the key figures in Silicon Valley history, including Steve Jobs, and the principals of Google and Hewlett-Packard.

In 2006, he was called to testify in front of a subcommittee of the U.S. House Energy and Commerce Committee to answer questions about an investigation by Hewlett-Packard into leaks from its board of directors, in which it was alleged that private detectives hired by the chairperson illegally obtained private phone records of some of the company's board members.

== Personal life ==
Sonsini has three children: two sons, Peter and Matthew, and one daughter, Alison. Peter joined the venture capital firm New Enterprise Associates in 2005 and became a general partner of the firm and head of its enterprise practice group. Pete co-founded Laude Ventures in December 2024 with Andy Konwinski. Matthew is married to Lisa Sobrato Sonsini, the daughter of billionaire real estate developer John A. Sobrato, and has served as CEO of The Sobrato Organization and chairman of its philanthropy.

Sonsini became chair of the board of trustees for Santa Clara University in 2021.
