= David Drummond (businessman) =

American business executive and lawyer

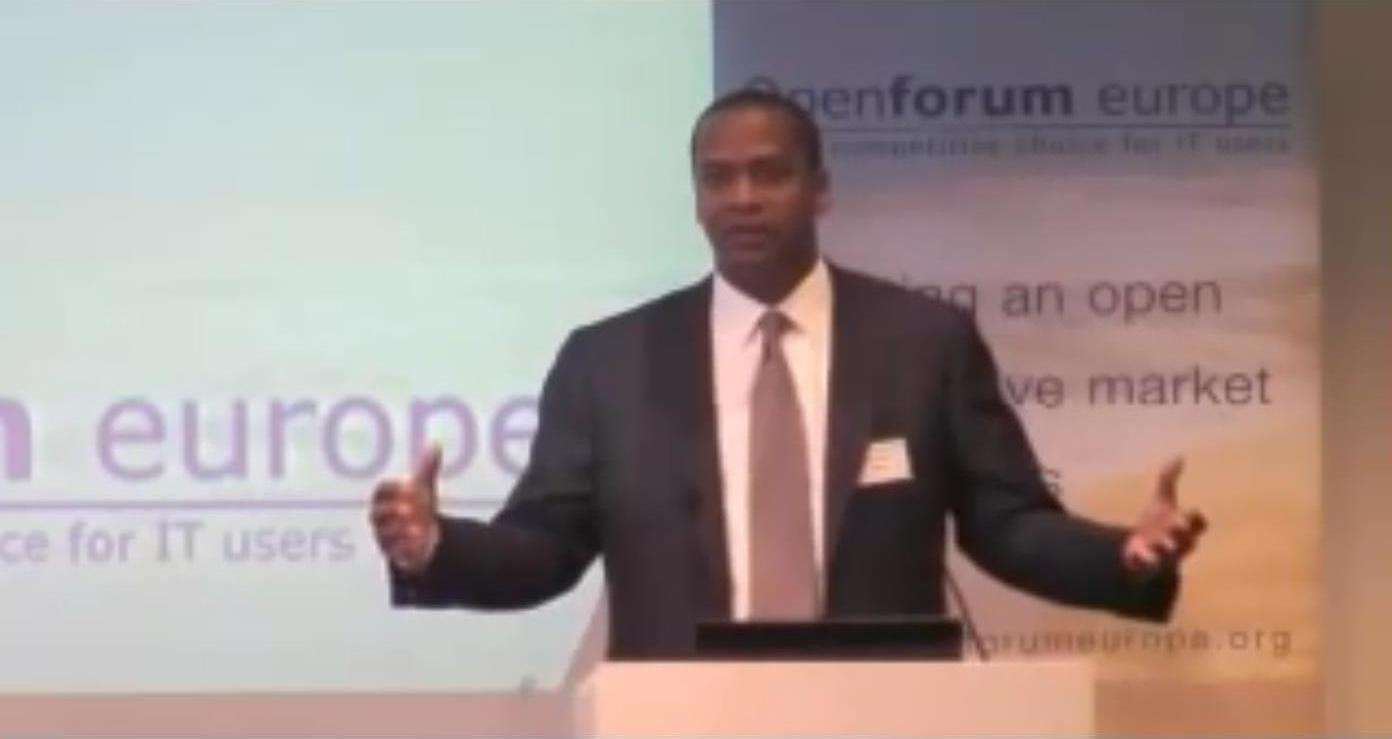
- Drummond in 2010
- Born: David Carl Drummond; March 6, 1963 (age 63); Carmel, California
- Education: Santa Clara University (BA); Stanford University (JD)
- Occupations: Formerly senior vice president and chief legal officer, Alphabet Inc.

David Carl Drummond (born March 6, 1963) is an American business executive and former lawyer. He served as senior vice president of corporate development and chief legal officer for Alphabet Inc., and, formerly, for its subsidiary, Google. Prior to joining Google, in 2002, Drummond was a partner at law firm Wilson Sonsini Goodrich & Rosati and then chief financial officer of software company SmartForce. Drummond retired from Alphabet on January 31, 2020.

== Career ==
Drummond received a Bachelor of Arts with a major in history from Santa Clara University and a Juris Doctor from Stanford Law School. He was admitted to the State Bar of California in 1989 but became ineligible to practice law in California since 2020. Drummond's first time working with Google was in 1998 as a partner at the technology law firm Wilson Sonsini Goodrich & Rosati's corporate transactions group; he was Google's first outside counsel. Drummond worked with Google co-founders Larry Page and Sergey Brin to raise funding and incorporate the company.

Drummond was chief financial officer (CFO) of software company SmartForce from June 1999 until January 2002. In July 2007, Drummond and three other SmartForce executives settled accounting violation charges brought by the U.S. Securities and Exchange Commission (SEC) resulting from an overstatement of the company's net income by $127 million during a period of time from 1999 to 2002. Drummond paid a $700,000 fine to the SEC; he was also ordered to pay a $125,000 civil fine by the New Hampshire District Court.

In February 2002, Drummond joined Google as vice president of corporate development and general counsel. He became Google's senior vice president of corporate development in January 2006 and chief legal officer in December 2006, positions he retained following Google's restructure into Alphabet Inc. in October 2015. He has also been secretary at Google and Alphabet since 2002.

During his tenure at Google, Drummond was involved in lawsuits the company fought against GEICO, Viacom, Microsoft and the Association of American Publishers. He played a central role in Google's right to be forgotten dispute in Europe and the company's exit from China in 2010. He also oversaw major acquisitions including YouTube, Android, DoubleClick and Motorola Mobility. Drummond is an advocate for freedom of speech and diversity.

Drummond was charged by the SEC in 2005 with causing Google to violate securities law because he failed to advise the company's board that the company was required to register $80 million in stock options used as compensation for employees. The SEC said in its press release, "By deciding Google could escape its disclosure requirements, and failing to inform the Board of the legal risks of his determination, Drummond caused the company to run afoul of the federal securities laws." In January 2005, Google and Drummond settled the complaint by agreeing not to violate securities laws in the future. Neither Google nor Drummond paid a fine or acknowledged wrongdoing.

Drummond and other Google executives were defendants in a trial in Italy which began in 2009 over a video of a child being bullied which had been uploaded to Google Video in 2006. None of the executives charged had any involvement with the creation or posting of the video and Google removed the video after being notified by authorities. The case could have had ramifications for content providers around the world. In 2010, Drummond and two other Google executives were found guilty of privacy violations and handed six-month suspended sentences. They were cleared of defamation charges. In December 2012, the convictions and sentences were overturned on appeal.

Drummond joined Uber's board of directors in August 2013 after Google Ventures led a $360 million funding round for Uber. Drummond stepped down from the board in August 2016 amid reports he had been shut out of board meetings due to his conflict of interest on self-driving cars. Drummond also sat on the board of Crisis Text Line, a not-for-profit organization, from 2012 to 2018. In 2014, Drummond was appointed a board member at Kohlberg Kravis Roberts, where he sat on its conflicts committee.

His compensation from Google's parent company, Alphabet Inc., was US$47,282,232 in 2018, US$664,252 in 2017, and US$664,387 in 2016. Drummond is an investor and advisor to the media company Ozy.

On January 10, 2020, it was announced that Drummond would leave Alphabet to retire, effective January 31, 2020, following scrutiny for potentially inappropriate relationships. He will not receive an exit package. In the months leading up to his announcement, Drummond sold off over $200 million of his Alphabet stock.

== Personal life ==
Drummond has a son born in 2007 during an extramarital affair with Jennifer Blakely, at the time a Google employee in the department he oversaw. Drummond's relationship with Blakely was detailed in a 2018 The New York Times exposé on sexual misconduct by executives at Google. Drummond married Corinne Dixon, an employee in Google's legal department, around September 2019.

Alphabet's board of directors, including Drummond, were sued by shareholders in January 2019 for allegedly covering up the sexual misconduct by executives. The board formed an independent committee and hired a law firm to investigate how executives handled the claims.

David's elder brother is jazz bassist Ray Drummond.
