= Michael G. McCaffery =

American businessman

- Education: Princeton University (BA); Merton College, Oxford (BA, MA); Stanford University (MBA)
- Occupation: Managing Director
- Known for: Former CEO of the Stanford Management Company

Michael G. McCaffery is an American businessman. He is chairman and managing director of Makena Capital Management. He was previously the president and CEO of the Stanford Management Company, which oversees the Stanford University endowment.

== Education ==
McCaffery holds a BA from Princeton University. He also received an BA and an MA as a Rhodes Scholar from Merton College, Oxford. He went on to study at the Stanford Graduate School of Business, receiving his MBA in 1982.

== Career ==
McCaffery was chairman of the board of Robertson Stephens, an investment banking firm. In 2000, he became president and CEO of the Stanford Management Company. The Wall Street Journal reported in 2006 that under his tenure, Stanford's endowment grew from $8.5 billion in 2000 to $15 billion.

In 2005, he founded Makena Capital Management alongside former colleagues from Stanford. In 2015, McCaffery became a member of Nvidia's board of directors.

In 2019, Makena restructured, shifting from a structure composed of a four-person management committee and a chief executive officer (CEO) to a "broader, flatter" 10-person arrangement. However, Makena would once again restructure in 2020, with McCaffery becoming the firm's day-to-day sole managing partner once again.

== Other activities ==
As of 2014, he served as a Trustee of the Rhodes Scholarship Trust.
