= Donald Friese =

American businessman (born 1940)

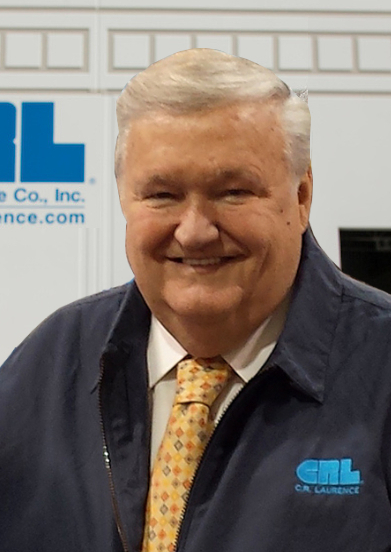
- Friese in 2020
- Born: 3 October 1940 (age 84); York, Pennsylvania, U.S.
- Occupation(s): CEO of C.R. Laurence Co., Inc.
- Title: Founder and CEO of C.R. Laurence Co., Inc.
- Spouse: Andrea Friese
- Children: 3
- Website: www.crlaurence.com

Donald Friese (born October 3, 1940) is an American billionaire businessman, and the chief executive (CEO) and former owner of C.R. Laurence Co., Inc., a glazing supplies company.

== Early life ==
Donald Friese was born in 1940 in York, Pennsylvania, the third of 13 siblings. After his high school graduation, he joined the U.S. Army in 1958, trained as a missile mechanic, and was stationed in Taiwan and Okinawa. He served in the army for 3 years before moving to Los Angeles with $125 in his pocket to find a job.

== Career ==
Friese started at C.R. Laurence in Los Angeles, which then had just one location, with an "entry-level job", as its sixth employee. A few years later, Bernie Harris, the owner, sold him a 10% stake, and he gradually acquired more, eventually buying Harris out when he retired. When Harris retired in 1997, Friese bought the 50% he did not already own. He expanded the business by acquiring competitors and launching a manufacturing operation. By 2015, the company manufactured more than 65,000 products for the glass industry. In 2015, Friese sold the company to the Irish conglomerate CRH plc for $1.3 billion cash, retaining most of the real estate and continuing as CEO. It was reported that Friese made $885 million from the sale of the company.

== Personal life ==
Friese and his wife Andrea live in Chatsworth, Los Angeles. They have three children.
