= Carl Berg =

American real estate investor and venture capitalist

Carl Edwin Berg
- Born: 1938 (age 87–88); New Mexico, US
- Occupations: Real estate developer Venture capitalist
- Spouse: Married
- Children: 1

Carl Edwin Berg (born 1938) is an American businessman, real estate investor and venture capitalist. He has been included in Forbes magazine's list of the 400 richest people in America several times, and in March 2013 his net worth was estimated at $1.1 billion.

== Early life ==
Carl Berg was born and raised in New Mexico. He has one brother, Clyde Berg, also a real estate developer.

== Career ==
Berg worked as a loan officer in Texas and then moved to California in the 1970s where he took a job running a mortgage company in Sunnyvale. In California, he partnered with real estate agent, John A. Sobrato, and pooling their owned capital, founded Midtown Realty. In 1979, they re-focused their business on building industrial campuses for the tech industry.

== Investments ==
Berg acquired Mission West Properties Real Estate Investment Trust in 1997, and sold it to realty developer Divco West in December 2012 for $1.3 billion.

Berg has invested in more than 100 technology startups. He began by investing in companies that were tenants of his Silicon Valley office buildings, occasionally trading office space for company stock. Berg's technology investments include the consulting firm International Network Services, which he bought from Lucent Technologies in 2002. He is a major investor in Verifyme, Inc. He is a major investor in Valence Technologies, owning 52% of the company and serving as chairman in 2011. He has also invested in Summit Semiconductor, and is on the board of directors of LynuxWorks.

Berg is also one of the founders of Berg LLC, also known as Berg Health, a biopharma company using AI approaches. In 2014, Berg invested in the development of a new prostate cancer test through BERG LLC.

== Personal life ==
Berg is married, with one daughter, and resides in Atherton, California.

In 1982, Berg's wife and daughter were kidnapped, escaped unharmed, and the perpetrators were caught.
