= Samuel Ginn =

American businessman (born 1937)

Samuel Lou Ginn (born 3 April 1937) is an American businessman.

== Early life ==
Samuel Lou Ginn was born on April 3, 1937, in Anniston, Alabama. He is a 1959 graduate of Auburn University's College of Engineering, and was awarded the institution's honorary doctorate in 1998. He was inducted into the State of Alabama Engineering Hall of Fame in 1992. Married to Ann Vance Ginn, they have three children and six grandchildren.

== Career ==
Ginn has more than four decades of experience in the telecommunications industry. Following his service with the Army Signal Corps, he built a 27-year career with AT&T beginning as a student engineer in 1960. He rose through the ranks in management and operations, and in 1977 was appointed vice president of network operations for AT&T Long Lines.

After the Bell Systems breakup, Ginn joined Pacific Telephone in 1978 as vice president in Los Angeles, going on to serve as chairman and CEO of Pacific Telesis from 1988 until 1994. When he resigned, Ginn launched AirTouch Communications, an early pioneer in the cellular industry that went public in 1994 with an IPO of $10 billion.

In 1999, the company was sold for $65 billion to Vodafone where Ginn assumed the position of chairman in the United Kingdom. During his tenure, Vodafone merged with Verizon to create Verizon Wireless, the largest wireless telecommunications network in the U.S. Ginn retired from Vodafone in 2000.

Ginn serves on the boards of Franklin Templeton and ICO Global Communications. His past corporate board memberships have included CH2M Hill, First Interstate Bank, Pacific Telesis Group, Safeway, Transamerica Corporation, Vodafone, AirTouch Communications, Chevron Corporation, Hewlett-Packard and the Fremont Group. He has also served as chairman of the California Business-Higher Education Forum, the California Business Roundtable and the Committee on Jobs. He is an overseer at the Hoover Institution in Palo Alto, as well as a Sloan Fellow at Stanford University's Graduate School of Business. In 2015, Ginn was inducted into the Wireless Hall of Fame for his dedication to the wireless industry.

== Philanthropy ==
Ginn was appointed by Gov. Bob Riley for an at large seat on the Auburn University Board of Trustees in 2005. His term expired on February 16, 2012. His $25 million gift to the Auburn University College of Engineering in 2001 helped fund a wireless engineering degree program and has helped vault Auburn into the nation's elite wireless research and teaching institutions. In recognition of the gift, the college was renamed the Samuel Ginn College of Engineering. Mr. Ginn continues his involvement with Auburn through its wireless advisory board.

The Ginn Family Foundation was founded in 2005 to provide funding for institutions and organizations that provide continuing and long-term societal, educational, and cultural benefit to the community. Through its grant activities, the Foundation supports organizations that produce solutions for social problems, and that educate, and/or train young people to be self-supporting. In addition, the foundation provides support for civic and cultural organizations that enhance the quality of life in California and in other communities.
