= Wilson Sonsini Goodrich & Rosati =

American law firm

Wilson Sonsini Goodrich & Rosati Professional Corporation
- Headquarters: Palo Alto, California, U.S.
- No. of offices: 17
- No. of attorneys: 1055 (March 1, 2026)
- No. of employees: 1973 (March 1, 2026)
- Major practice areas: Corporate, intellectual property, litigation, technology transactions, and regulatory
- Key people: Larry Sonsini (senior and founding partner); Tony Jeffries (board chair); Douglas J. Clark (managing partner)
- Revenue: $1.6 billion (2026)
- Profit per equity partner: $3.7 million (2026)
- Date founded: 1961
- Company type: P.C.
- Website: Official website

Wilson Sonsini Goodrich & Rosati (known as Wilson Sonsini) is an American multinational law firm specializing in business, securities, venture capital, and intellectual property law. Headquartered in Palo Alto, California, the firm's clients are primarily technology companies, life science firms, emerging industries, venture capital firms, private equity establishments, and investment banks.

== Offices ==
The firm is headquartered in Palo Alto. Wilson Sonsini has 12 additional offices in the United States: Austin; Boston; Boulder; Los Angeles (Century City); Los Angeles (Downtown); New York; Salt Lake City; San Diego; San Francisco (Financial District); Seattle; Washington, D.C.; and Wilmington, Delaware. The firm has 4 offices abroad in Hong Kong; Shanghai, China; Brussels, Belgium; and London, England.

== History ==
Wilson Sonsini was founded in 1961 as McCloskey, Wilson & Mosher in Palo Alto, California, with attorneys Paul N. "Pete" McCloskey Jr., John Arnot Wilson, and Roger Laurence Mosher as the name partners. The firm since launch has primarily been focused on the representation of emerging technology companies and venture capitalists. Lawrence W. "Larry" Sonsini joined the firm in 1966 and after McCloskey left for Congress the firm became Wilson, Mosher & Sonsini. In 1969, the firm helped form Mayfield Fund, a venture capital firm.

In 1970, John B. Goodrich, who held a J.D. from the University of Southern California (1966) and an LL.M. in taxation from New York University (1970), joined the firm as its eighth or ninth lawyer and founded its Tax Department. The following year, Mario M. Rosati, a graduate of Boalt Hall, joined to establish the firm's Trust and Estates practice; he had earlier incorporated semiconductor equipment company Aehr Test Systems in 1977 and served on its board for 45 years.

In 1978, name partner Roger L. Mosher broke off, taking a portion of the firm with him, and the firm adopted its current name of Wilson Sonsini Goodrich & Rosati, PC. On November 6, 2019, in conjunction with the launch of a new company website, the firm started to use the shortened name, "Wilson Sonsini".

In 1980, Wilson Sonsini represented Apple Inc. in its initial public offering (IPO). The firm was also involved in representing companies in the semiconductor industry like, LSI Logic, Altera, Cirrus Logic, Lattice Semiconductor, and Cypress Semiconductor.

In late 1998, the firm opened its first national office, in Kirkland, Washington, led by partner Patrick Schultheis. Within the next few years, the firm opened offices in Austin, Texas; San Francisco; Northern Virginia; New York; and San Diego. In 2005, Wilson Sonsini launched an office in China and enhanced its New York office. In 2006 the firm relocated its Northern Virginia lawyers to Washington, D.C., to be closer to government regulators and the firm eventually moved its Kirkland office to Seattle. The firm also opened offices in Los Angeles, Boston, Wilmington, Delaware, Salt Lake City, Utah, and Boulder, Colorado. Internationally, the firm has offices in London, Brussels, Beijing (shut down in 2025), Hong Kong, and Shanghai.

In 1994, Wilson Sonsini represented Netscape Communications in its IPO, in addition to representing several other companies that were tied to the advent of the internet age, like Infoseek, USWeb/CKS, and Inktomi.

In 1999, when VA Linux went public, the firm reaped $24.5 million as the value of the 100,000 shares that the firm held ballooned in value. Other IPOs that enriched the firm because of its equity stake were those of Ask Jeeves, Google, and online grocer Webvan. With the downturn in the dotcom economy, however, Wilson Sonsini had to make a number of adjustments; 100 support staff and 60 associates were laid off—about 10% of its attorneys. Better times eventually returned. In 2004, the firm advised Google on its $2.7 billion IPO.

In February 2005, the firm announced that Larry Sonsini, 64, who had been chief executive for more than 20 years, stepped aside, and named John Roos, a 20-year veteran partner who had led representations of young companies and entrepreneurs, as chief executive officer.

After becoming CEO, Roos steered Wilson Sonsini beyond the burst tech bubble toward a broader client portfolio and a global presence.

In 2009, after President Obama appointed Roos as U.S. Ambassador to Japan, Steven E. Bochner, a 28 year veteran partner at the firm, succeeded Roos as CEO.

In 2016, Wilson Sonsini represented LinkedIn acquisition by Microsoft at a price of US$26.2 billion.

Wilson Sonsini represented Twitter in the transaction involving Elon Musk's $44 billion take-private bid.

In May 2025, Wilson Sonsini sold SixFifty, its legal tech unit, to Paychex, an American payment technology company, in an all-cash deal worth between $70 million and $85 million.

Wilson Sonsini is also serving as outside counsel for Google in its antitrust litigation before the U.S. Department of Justice. The firm's partner Susan Creighton, a longtime advisor to Google, contributed to an internal memo at Netscape that helped prompt the U.S. DOJ's investigation of Microsoft in the 1990s. Creighton also led outside counsel efforts during Google's 2013 settlement of an FTC antitrust inquiry.

Douglas Clark led the firm, from 2012 until retirement in August 2026, when Caz Hashemi and Megan Baier will helm Wilson Sonsini as co-managing partners.

== Notable people ==
Some of the more notable current and former Wilson Sonsini attorneys include:

- Michael Arrington, founder, TechCrunch
- Timothy Broas, former United States Ambassador to the Netherlands
- William B. Chandler, III, judge, Delaware Superior Court; Chancellor, Delaware Court of Chancery (1989–2007)
- Peter Detkin, Managing Partner at Intellectual Ventures
- David Drummond, Chief Legal Officer and Senior Vice President at Google
- Mark Farrell, supervisor, San Francisco Board of Supervisors (2011–2018)
- Richard Frenkel, former Director of Intellectual Property at Cisco
- Victor Jih, winner of The Amazing Race 14
- Chris Kelly, first General Counsel of Facebook, former Democratic candidate for Attorney General of California
- Ro Khanna, Congressman, United States House of Representatives (2017–); former Deputy Assistant Secretary, United States Department of Commerce
- Lucy H. Koh, judge, United States Court of Appeals for the Ninth Circuit (2021-); former judge, United States District Court for the Northern District of California (2010–2021)
- Pete McCloskey, Congressman, United States House of Representatives (1967–83)
- John Roos, former CEO and Senior Partner of Wilson Sonsini; United States Ambassador to Japan (2009–13)
- Larry Sonsini, senior partner and founder, "godfather" of Silicon Valley Law
- Chiang Wan-an, Legislator of the Legislative Yuan in the ROC (Taiwan), Mayor of Taipei (2022–)
- Trina A. Higgins, former U.S. attorney for Utah (2022–25)

== Recognition ==
In 2025, the firm was recognized with the NLADA's Beacon of Justice award for their work related to sustaining equal justice.

== See also ==
- List of largest United States-based law firms by profits per partner
