= John A. Sobrato =

American businessman (born 1939)

- Born: May 23, 1939 (age 87); San Francisco, California, US
- Education: Bellarmine College Preparatory, Santa Clara University
- Occupation: Businessman
- Title: Founder and chairman, The Sobrato Organization
- Spouse: Susan Sobrato
- Children: 3

John Albert Sobrato (born c. May 23, 1939) is an American billionaire real estate developer, and the founder of the Cupertino, California-based Sobrato Organization, a Silicon Valley development firm specializing in commercial and residential real estate. He has been listed as one of the richest Americans for many years, and he and his family have made large philanthropic donations to a variety of causes.

== Early life ==
John Sobrato was born to Italian immigrants Ann Ainardi (1915-2000) and John Mossimo Sobrato (1895-1952). Sobrato's parents met in the 1930s and married in 1938, even though he was 20 years her senior. Sobrato's father owned a popular San Francisco restaurant, John's Rendezvous. After his father's death from cancer in 1952, Sobrato's mother sold the restaurant and used the proceeds to begin investing in real estate.

== Career ==
Sobrato began his own real estate investing in 1957, while still in college at Santa Clara University. Beginning in 1972 he worked closely with another successful Silicon Valley investor, Carl Berg, for many years. He founded the Sobrato Organization in 1979; his son, John Michael Sobrato, took over leadership of the company in 1998. The company grew to hold more than 110 commercial buildings and more than 30 apartment complexes. In 2013, both father and son announced that they were moving away from managing the operations of the company to focus on charitable activities.

Sobrato and his family are listed at #110 on the 2014 Forbes 400 list with an estimated net worth of $4.8 billion, and at #340 on The World's Billionaires list as of May 10, 2014.

Sobrato and his son have both signed on the Warren Buffett's Giving Pledge to donate their wealth for charitable purposes. By the close of 2014, the Sobrato Philanthropies (which encompass the Sobrato Family Foundation, family-directed giving, and corporate giving through The Sobrato Organization) had given more than $314 million in money and property. Major beneficiaries have included Santa Clara University, Sobrato High School, and Bellarmine College Preparatory. In 2015, he and his wife offered the biggest ever individual pledge to the University of San Francisco, worth $15 million.

== Personal life ==
Sobrato and his wife Susan live in Atherton, California. Sue and John have three children, John Michael Sobrato, Sheri Sobrato Brisson, and Lisa Sobrato Sonsini, five grandsons, and two granddaughters. His son John M. Sobrato is a minority owner of San Francisco 49ers.
