= Stanford University endowment =

Academic endowment

Stanford Management Company
- Company type: Private
- Industry: Investment management
- Founded: 1991
- Headquarters: Stanford, California, U.S.
- Key people: Robert Wallace (CEO & CIO)
- AUM: ▲US$40.6 billion (FY '25)
- Owner: Stanford University
- Website: stanford.edu smc.stanford.edu

The Stanford University endowment includes real estate and other investments valued at $40.6 billion as of August 31, 2025, and is one of the four largest academic endowments in the United States. The endowment consists of $35.5 billion in a merged pool of assets and $5.1 billion of real estate near the main campus. Along with Stanford's pension assets, working capital, and non-cash gifts, the endowment is managed by Stanford Management Company (SMC), a Stanford-owned investment management company.

== History ==
=== Nineteenth century ===
==== 1895–1899 ====
The history of the Stanford University endowment predates the university's founding. The endowment began in 1885 when Leland Stanford and his wife Jane conveyed approximately $20 million to the university. Upon Leland's death, the federal government filed a claim against his estate for $15 million which threatened the university's financials. Jane, who had assumed full control of the university and its finances, managed to keep the university afloat by selling personal assets and contributing personal funds. In 1896, the U.S. Supreme Court ruled in favor of the Stanford Estate in the case United States v. Stanford which relieved financial pressure on the university.

=== Twentieth century ===
==== 1900–1950 ====
In the early 20th century, Stanford University, founded in 1885 by Leland and Jane Stanford, relied heavily on the initial endowment of lands and the wealth left by the Stanfords. The initial years saw modest growth in the endowment, primarily through traditional philanthropic avenues. However, it was during this period that the foundation for later growth was laid. For example, Stanford's early association with the fledgling technology industry began with faculty members like Frederick Terman, who is often credited with fostering the early development of Silicon Valley.

During this period, Stanford's endowment grew from approximately $10 million in 1900 to about $20 million by 1950.

==== 1950–1970 ====
The post-World War II era marked a significant phase in expanding Stanford's endowment. The federal government's increased funding for research, especially in defense and technology, benefited the university substantially. By the 1950s, Stanford had established the Stanford Industrial Park, later known as the Stanford Research Park, which attracted technology firms and facilitated partnerships between the university and the burgeoning tech industry.

This period also saw substantial donations from alumni and industrialists who increasingly recognized Stanford's pivotal role in innovation and technology. By 1970, Stanford's endowment had grown to approximately $100 million.

==== 1970–1990 ====
The 1970s and 1980s were transformative decades for Stanford's endowment, driven significantly by the university's strategic involvement in the growth of Silicon Valley. Stanford's faculty, students, and alumni played crucial roles in founding numerous high-tech companies, including Hewlett-Packard and Cisco Systems. The university's proactive policies in allowing faculty to commercialize their research and in taking equity positions in start-ups resulted in substantial financial gains.

One of the landmark contributions to Stanford's endowment came from Bill Hewlett and David Packard, founders of Hewlett-Packard, who were instrumental in establishing the William and Flora Hewlett Foundation and the David and Lucile Packard Foundation. These foundations donated significantly to Stanford, enhancing its financial stability and capacity for future growth.

In addition to direct donations, Stanford's endowment benefited immensely from its venture capital and private equity investments, particularly those connected to the tech industry. The university's participation in venture capital funds, such as those managed by Sequoia Capital and Kleiner Perkins, yielded impressive returns. By 1990, Stanford's endowment had surged to approximately $1 billion.

==== 1990–1999 ====
By the 1990s, Stanford's endowment had grown to be one of the largest in the world, thanks in large part to the success of its investments in Silicon Valley companies. In response to the growing complexity of investment markets and the need for specialized asset management, the university founded the Stanford Management Company in 1991. Before the establishment of SMC, Stanford's financial assets were managed internally by the university's Office of the Treasurer, which is now a function of the SMC. The creation of SMC aimed to professionalize asset management, bringing in specialized financial expertise to optimize investment strategies and enhance returns.

The university continued to receive substantial philanthropic contributions from tech entrepreneurs and investors. For instance, Google co-founders Larry Page and Sergey Brin, both Stanford graduates, made significant contributions to the university, further bolstering its endowment. Moreover, the university's strategic decision to retain ownership stakes in successful start-ups continued to pay off handsomely. Notably, Stanford's early investment in Google, when the company was still a small start-up, resulted in a substantial financial windfall that significantly augmented the university's endowment. By the end of 1999, Stanford's endowment had grown to approximately $4 billion.

=== Twenty-first century ===
==== 2000–2010 ====
In the early 2000s, Stanford's endowment saw substantial growth, spurred by the continued success of Silicon Valley companies and large philanthropic contributions. By 2000, the endowment had reached approximately $9 billion.

One of the significant factors contributing to the endowment's growth was Stanford's strategic investments in technology firms. Although it ended abruptly in 2001, the dot-com boom left Stanford with significant returns from earlier investments in successful tech companies. Moreover, significant donations continued to flow in. For instance, in 2001, Jim Clark, the founder of Netscape, donated $150 million to the Stanford University Medical Center.

The university also benefited from its partnerships with tech giants. In 2005, Google announced a $2.8 million gift to support the Stanford School of Engineering's new center for innovation. Also in 2005, SAP SE founder Hasso Plattner donated $35 million to establish the Hasso Plattner Institute of Design, which is also known as the Stanford d.school.

In 2006, President John L. Hennessy launched a five-year campaign called the Stanford Challenge, which reached its $4.3 billion fundraising goal in 2009, two years ahead of time, but continued fundraising for the duration of the campaign. It concluded at the end of 2011, having raised $6.23 billion and breaking the previous campaign fundraising record of $3.88 billion held by Yale. Funds supported 366 new fellowships for graduate students, 139 new endowed chairs for faculty, and 38 new or renovated buildings. The new funding also enabled the construction of a facility for stem cell research, a new campus for the business school, an expansion of the law school, a new Engineering Quad, a new art and art history building; an on-campus concert hall; the new Cantor Arts Center; and a planned expansion of the medical school.

Additionally, in 2007, co-founder of Netscape and Andreessen Horowitz Marc Andreessen and his wife Laura Arillaga-Andreessen donated $27 million to create a new central building of the Stanford Hospital.

By the end of the decade, the endowment had grown to approximately $12 billion despite the 2008 financial crisis, which caused a short-lived dip in its value.

==== 2010–2020 ====
The decade from 2010 to 2020 was a period of extraordinary growth and expansion for Stanford's endowment. By 2010, the endowment had rebounded to about $13.8 billion after recovering from the 2008 financial crisis.

Significant contributions during this period included a $100 million donation from Nike co-founder and Stanford alumni Phil Knight in 2011 to establish the Knight-Hennessy Scholars program.

The university became the first school to raise more than a billion dollars in a year after raising $1.035 billion in 2012.

In 2013, Dorothy and Robert King, prominent venture capitalists, donated $150 million to support Stanford's global development programs.

Stanford's venture capital investments continued to yield high returns. The university maintained stakes in several high-profile tech companies, benefiting from IPOs and acquisitions. By 2015, the endowment had grown to $22.2 billion.

In 2016, Phil Knight made another transformative gift, pledging $400 million to the Knight-Hennessy Scholars program, marking one of the largest donations to any university in the world. By the end of the decade, Stanford's endowment had reached approximately $28.9 billion.

The 2018 NACUBO-TIAA survey of colleges and universities in the United States and Canada noted that only Harvard University, the University of Texas System, and Yale University had larger endowments than Stanford at the time. Within five years, Stanford had eclipsed both the University of Texas System and Yale University in terms of assets under management.

==== 2020–Present ====
Despite challenges posed by the COVID-19 pandemic in the early part of the decade, Stanford's endowment continued to grow, driven by its strong investment strategy and substantial donations.

In 2020, Stanford received a historic $1.1 billion gift from Silicon Valley investor John Doerr and his wife, Ann, to establish the Stanford Doerr School of Sustainability. This gift was among the largest ever made to a university. It underscored Stanford's leading role in addressing global sustainability challenges.

Stanford's endowment strategy focused on diversified investments, including private equity, real estate, and hedge funds. The endowment's value reached approximately $34.6 billion by 2022, reflecting the financial markets' strong performance and the university's successful fundraising efforts. 2022 also saw a $75 million donation by Phil Knight and his wife Penny in support of a multidisciplinary neurodegenerative brain disease research initiative at the university's Wu Tsai Neurosciences Institute.

In 2023, Stanford announced another significant gift of $600 million from venture capitalist Marc Andreessen to support the development of a new engineering complex and fund scholarships for underrepresented students in STEM fields.

By mid-2024, Stanford's total assets under management, combining the $10.7 billion hospital and donor-advised funds, $29.9 billion merged pool, and $6.6 billion in real estate, reached approximately $47.2 billion, making Stanford the second largest university by assets under management in the world.

== Investment Strategy ==
SMC employs a diversified investment strategy to manage Stanford University's endowment, allocating funds across various asset classes, including public equities, fixed income, private equity, venture capital, real estate, and natural resources. The investment strategy currently consists of 8,800 smaller funds, of which more than 75% have restricted usage for purposes specified by donors.

=== Sustainable and Responsible Investing ===
In recent years, SMC has increasingly focused on sustainable and responsible investing. The company has integrated environmental, social, and governance (ESG) factors into its investment processes, reflecting a broader trend among institutional investors to consider the long-term impact of their investments on society and the environment.

== Performance ==
The endowment has experienced significant growth, particularly during periods of economic expansion, while facing challenges during market downturns, such as the 2008 financial crisis.

== Governance ==
SMC is governed by a board of directors, including Stanford University's board of trustees and experienced investment professionals. This governance structure ensures that SMC's investment strategies align with the university's mission and goals.

== Impact ==
The successful management of Stanford's endowment by SMC has significantly impacted the university. It has provided critical funding for scholarships, faculty positions, research projects, and campus infrastructure, enhancing Stanford's ability to attract top talent and remain at the forefront of academic and scientific innovation. SMC's approaches and strategies have influenced endowment management practices across higher education institutions, setting a benchmark for diversification, innovation, and responsible investing.

== See also ==
- Stanford University
- Endowment
- Investment management
