= L22 =

L22 may refer to:

== Ships ==
- HMS L22, a submarine of the Royal Navy
- HMS Aldenham (L22), a destroyer of the Royal Navy
- HMS Folkestone (L22), a sloop of the Royal Navy
- INS Kumbhir (L22), an amphibious warfare vessel of the Indian Navy
- Soviet submarine L-22
- Spanish ship Aragón (L-22)

== Other uses ==
- 60S ribosomal protein L22
- L22 carbine, a British carbine assault rifle
- Mitochondrial ribosomal protein L22
- Yucca Valley Airport, in San Bernardino County, California, United States
- Zeppelin LZ 64, an airship of the Imperial German Navy
