= Yucca Valley, California =

Town in California, United States

- Town
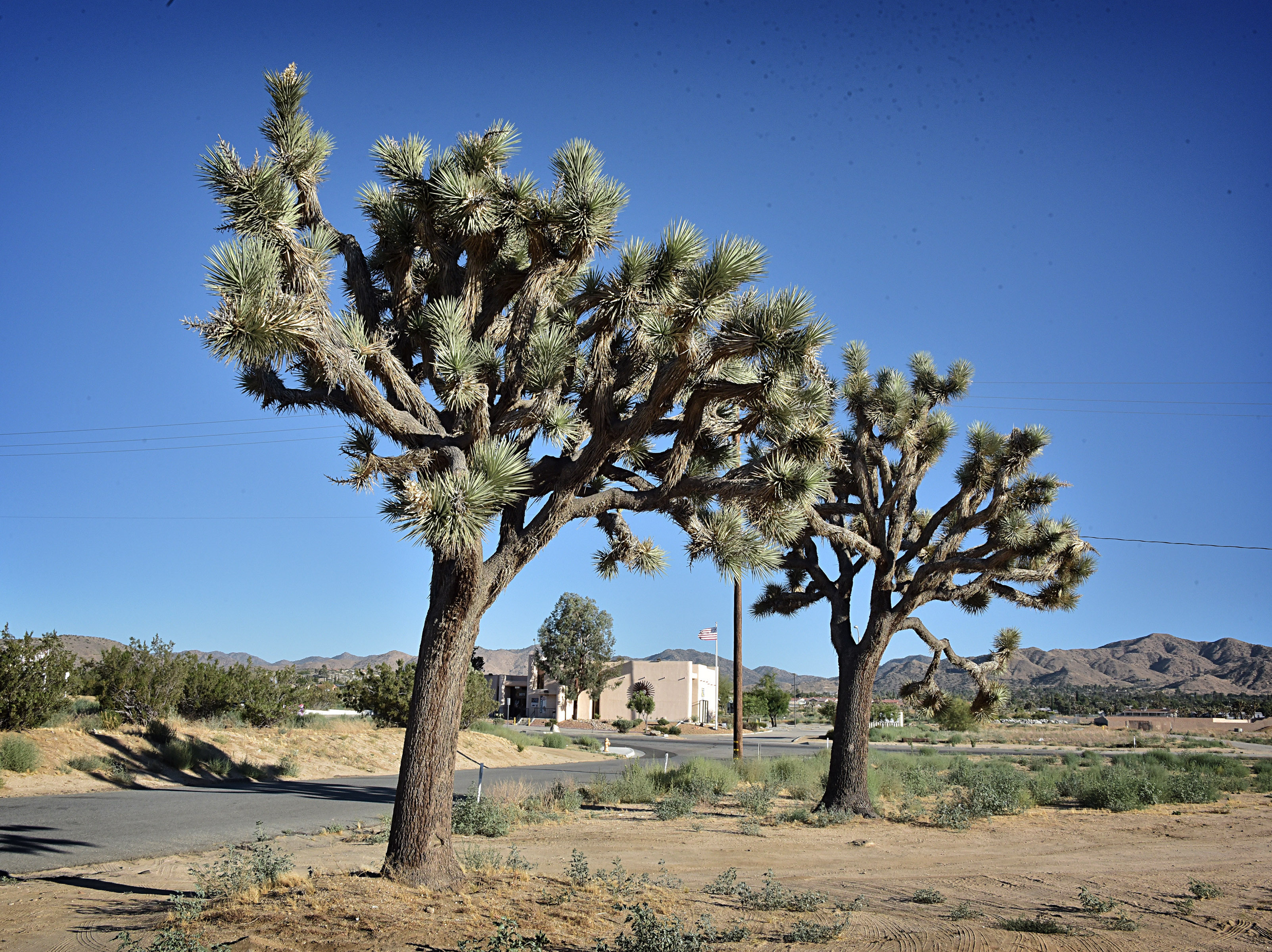
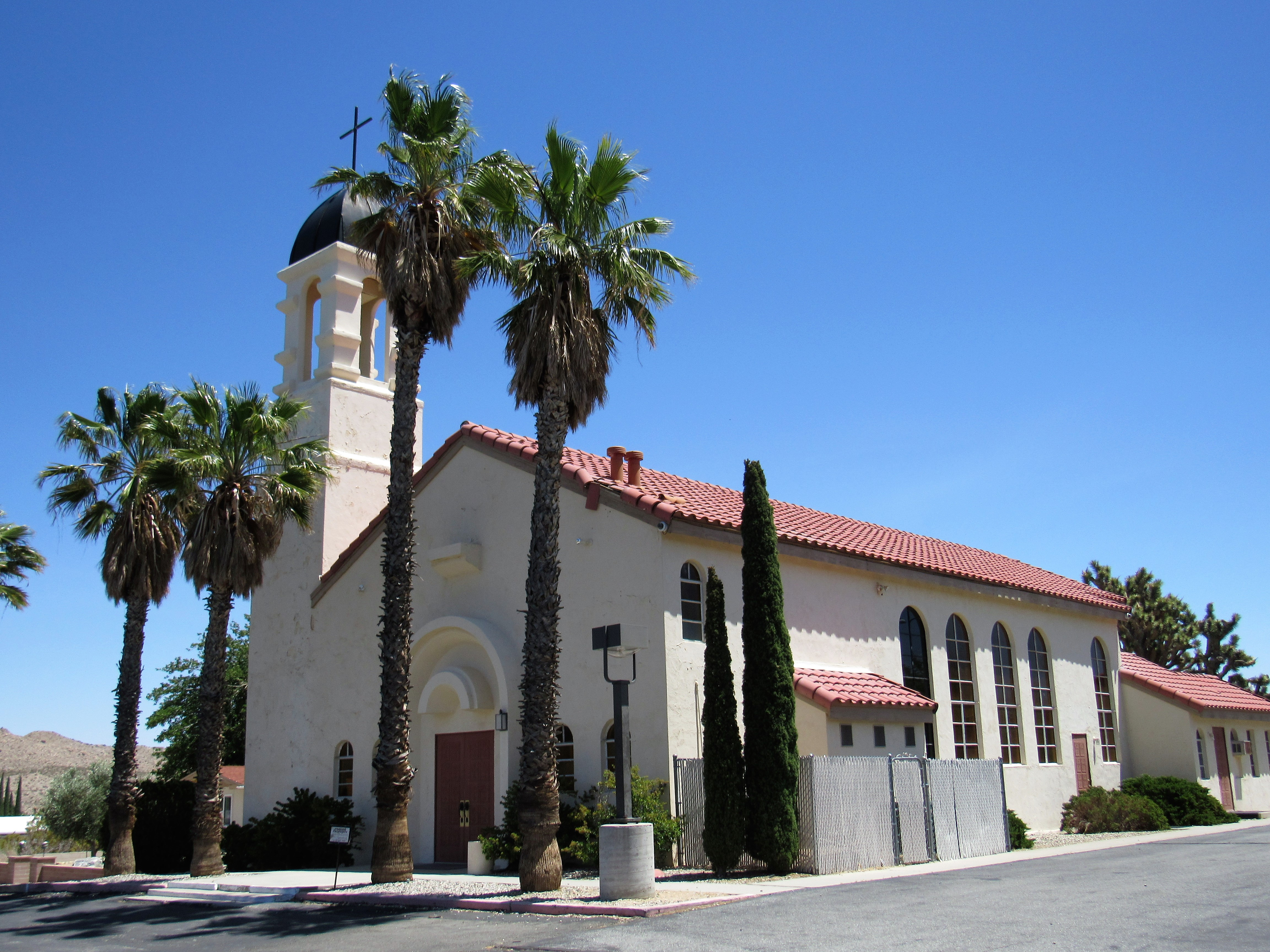
- View of Yucca Valley (left) and St. Mary of the Valley Church (right).

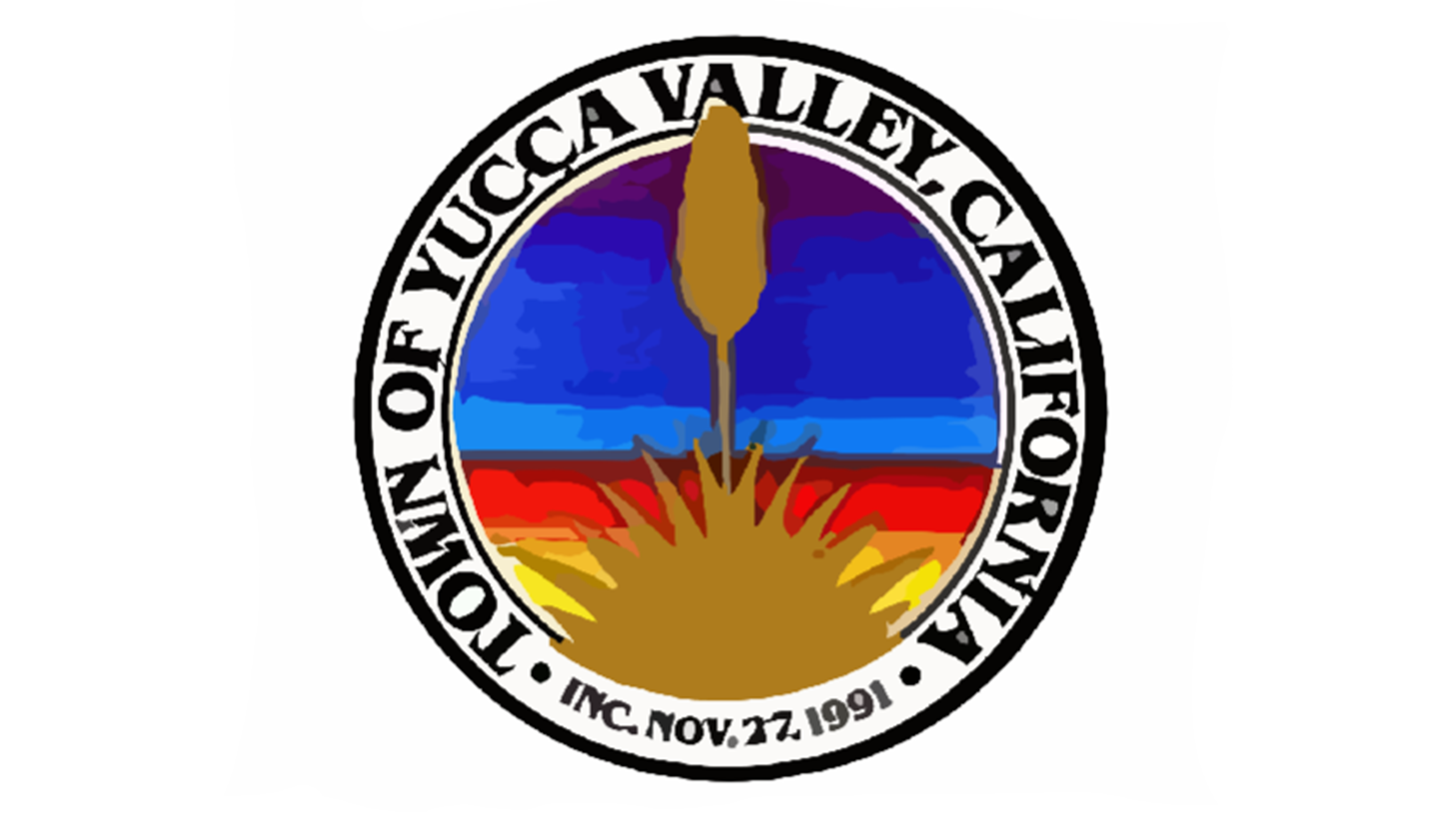
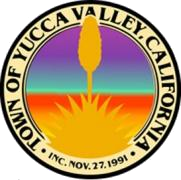
- Flag Seal
- Interactive map of Yucca Valley, California
- Coordinates: 34°06′51″N 116°25′56″W
- Country: United States
- State: California
- County: San Bernardino
- Incorporated: November 27, 1991

Government
  - Type: Council-Manager
  - Mayor: Jeff Drozd

Area
  - Total: 39.83 sq mi (103.16 km^{2})
  - Land: 39.83 sq mi (103.16 km^{2})
  - Water: 0 sq mi (0.00 km^{2}) 0%
- Elevation: 3,258 ft (993 m)

Population (2020)
  - Total: 21,738
  - Density: 546/sq mi (210.7/km^{2})
- Time zone: UTC-8 (Pacific Time Zone)
  - Summer (DST): UTC-7 (PDT)
- ZIP codes: 92284–92286
- Area codes: 442/760
- FIPS code: 06-87056
- GNIS feature IDs: 2413524
- Website: www.yucca-valley.org

Yucca Valley is an incorporated town in San Bernardino County, California, United States. The population was 21,738 as of the 2020 census. Yucca Valley lies 20 miles (32 km) north of Palm Springs, and 49 miles (79 km) east of San Bernardino. Bordered to the south by the Joshua Tree National Park and to the west by the San Bernardino Mountains, the town of Yucca Valley is located in the Mojave Desert at roughly 3,300 feet (1,000 m) above sea level.

== History ==
Serrano people and the Chemehuevi were the first inhabitants of Yucca Valley.

Norman J. Essig was key in the late 1950s in working towards establishing Yucca Valley as a place for entertainment celebrities to come and live in privacy. He personally acquired hundreds of acres of land during this time and owned and ran Glenn Realty. He helped to put in the main roads that are running throughout the town off of Hwy 62. He was personal friends with Jimmy Van Heusen the composer and gave him prime real estate in Yucca Valley to build his house which can still be seen atop the highest hill in the center of the town.

In 1992, three large earthquakes occurred near the city, the magnitude 6.1 Joshua Tree earthquake on April 22, and on June 28 the 7.3 Landers and 6.5 Big Bear earthquakes.

The 7.1 magnitude Hector Mine earthquake on October 16, 1999, had an epicenter 30 miles (48 km) north of town.

On July 11, 2006, a wildfire started by lightning raced through neighboring Pioneertown. The blaze, named the Sawtooth Complex fire, also burned into Yucca Valley and nearby Morongo Valley and destroyed roughly 64,000 acres (26,000 ha) of desert landscape.

== Geography ==
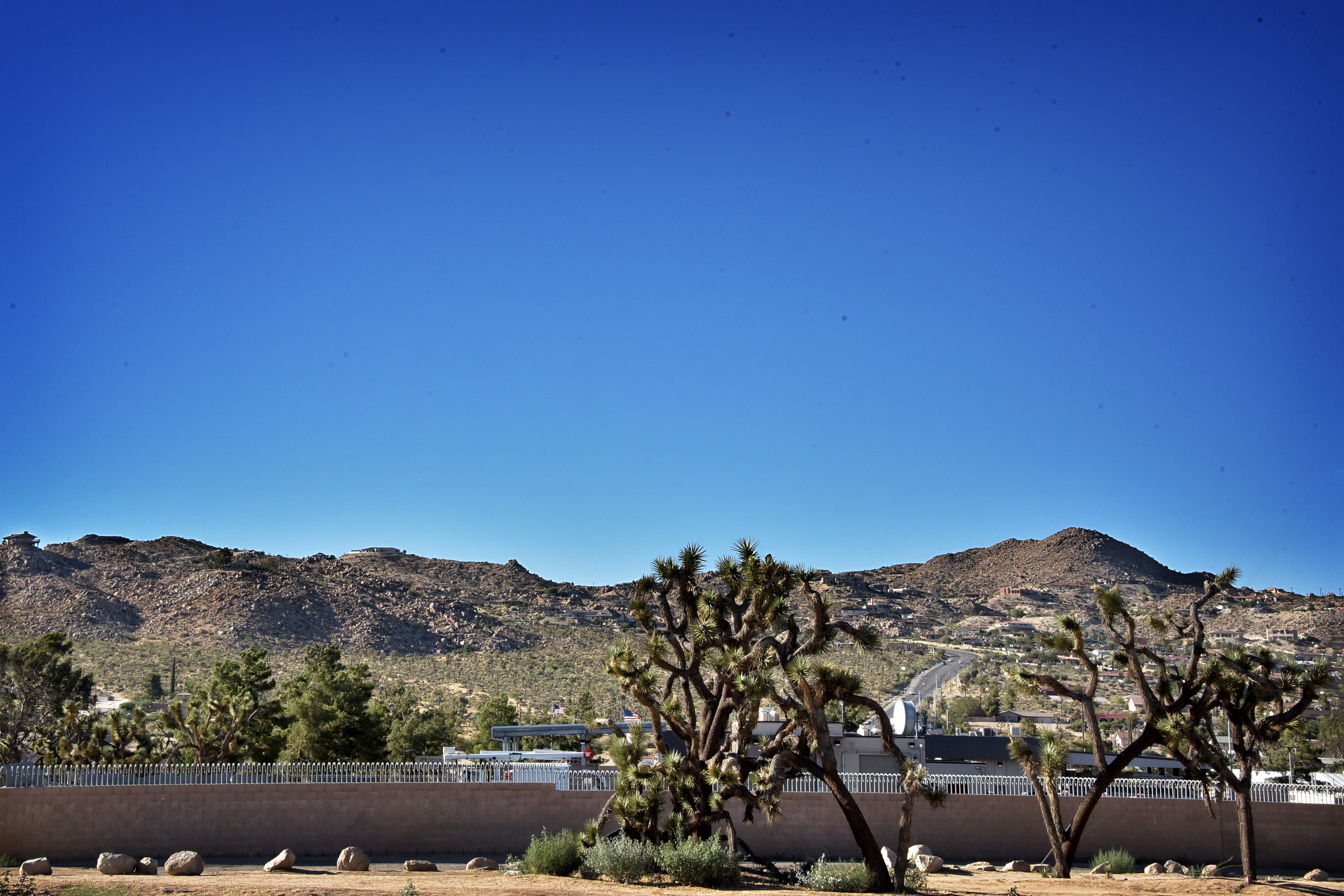
Yucca Valley looking north from the intersection of Highways 62 and 247

Yucca Valley lies in the middle of the Morongo Basin at a base elevation of 3,300 feet. Joshua Tree National Park is adjacent to its southern border.

According to the United States Census Bureau, the town has a total area of 40.0 square miles (104 km^{2}). All of it is land and none of it is covered in water. Yucca Valley is located north of the Joshua Tree National Park, while the Little San Bernardino Mountains and many hills cover a large percentage of city area.

This High Desert community has an elevation (city hall) at 3,224 feet (983 m) above sea level. Snowfall occurs almost annually whenever the snow level drops to elevations under 4,000 feet (1,200 m). The area's terrain is prone to wildfires (such as the Pioneertown fire in July 2006), resulting from plant growth during the rainy seasons and flash floods. The plants within the town and among the chaparral in the mountains outside of the San Bernardino National Forest wilt and perish from the summer heat, providing ample fuel during a fire.

Yucca Valley has experienced high levels of seismic activity. Fault lines criss-cross the town and the Morongo basin.

=== Climate ===
According to the Köppen Climate Classification system, Yucca Valley has a cold desert climate, abbreviated "BWk" on climate maps.

Climate data for Yucca Valley, CA
Month	Jan	Feb	Mar	Apr	May	Jun	Jul	Aug	Sep	Oct	Nov	Dec	Year
Mean daily maximum °F (°C)	61.1 (16.2)	61.1 (16.2)	69.1 (20.6)	74.4 (23.6)	86.3 (30.2)	92.3 (33.5)	102.0 (38.9)	99.0 (37.2)	95.8 (35.4)	80.1 (26.7)	70.1 (21.2)	58.3 (14.6)	79.13 (26.18)
Mean daily minimum °F (°C)	38.5 (3.6)	38.8 (3.8)	40.2 (4.6)	44.4 (6.9)	54.1 (12.3)	59.9 (15.5)	71.6 (22.0)	67.5 (19.7)	64.1 (17.8)	52.8 (11.6)	43.9 (6.6)	36.3 (2.4)	51.01 (10.56)
Average precipitation inches (mm)	0.7 (18)	0.5 (13)	0.4 (10)	0.1 (2.5)	0.2 (5.1)	0 (0)	0.3 (7.6)	0.4 (10)	0.4 (10)	0.4 (10)	0.6 (15)	0.8 (20)	4.8 (120)
Source: Weatherbase

== Demographics ==
Historical population
Census	Pop.	Note	%±
1970	3,893		—
1980	8,294		113.0%
1990	13,701		65.2%
2000	16,865		23.1%
2010	20,700		22.7%
2020	21,738		5.0%
U.S. Decennial Census

=== Racial and ethnic composition ===
Yucca Valley town, California – Racial and ethnic composition Note: the US Census treats Hispanic/Latino as an ethnic category. This table excludes Latinos from the racial categories and assigns them to a separate category. Hispanics/Latinos may be of any race.
Race / Ethnicity (NH = Non-Hispanic)	Pop 2000	Pop 2010	Pop 2020	% 2000	% 2010	% 2020
White alone (NH)	13,829	15,258	13,962	82.00%	73.71%	64.23%
Black or African American alone (NH)	350	601	721	2.08%	2.90%	3.32%
Native American or Alaska Native alone (NH)	158	151	173	0.94%	0.73%	0.80%
Asian alone (NH)	212	450	559	1.26%	2.17%	2.57%
Native Hawaiian or Pacific Islander alone (NH)	42	33	63	0.25%	0.16%	0.29%
Other race alone (NH)	18	31	94	0.11%	0.15%	0.43%
Mixed race or Multiracial (NH)	334	497	1,092	1.98%	2.40%	5.02%
Hispanic or Latino (any race)	1,922	3,679	5,074	11.40%	17.77%	23.34%
Total	16,865	20,700	21,738	100.00%	100.00%	100.00%

=== 2020 census ===
As of the 2020 census, Yucca Valley had a population of 21,738 and a population density of 545.8 inhabitants per square mile (210.7/km^{2}).

The age distribution was 21.5% under the age of 18, 7.1% aged 18 to 24, 23.8% aged 25 to 44, 25.9% aged 45 to 64, and 21.8% who were 65 years of age or older. The median age was 42.9 years. For every 100 females, there were 95.0 males, and for every 100 females age 18 and over there were 93.2 males age 18 and over.

84.2% of residents lived in urban areas, while 15.8% lived in rural areas.

The census reported that 99.0% of the population lived in households, 0.3% lived in non-institutionalized group quarters, and 0.6% were institutionalized.

There were 8,807 households, out of which 27.2% included children under the age of 18, 41.1% were married-couple households, 8.0% were cohabiting couple households, 29.8% had a female householder with no spouse or partner present, and 21.1% had a male householder with no spouse or partner present. 30.2% of households were one person, and 15.7% were one person aged 65 or older. The average household size was 2.44. There were 5,494 families (62.4% of all households).

There were 9,896 housing units at an average density of 248.4 units per square mile (95.9 units/km^{2}), of which 89.0% were occupied and 11.0% were vacant. Of occupied units, 66.4% were owner-occupied and 33.6% were occupied by renters. The homeowner vacancy rate was 2.6% and the rental vacancy rate was 6.6%.

Racial composition as of the 2020 census
Race	Number	Percent
White	15,490	71.3%
Black or African American	803	3.7%
American Indian and Alaska Native	316	1.5%
Asian	586	2.7%
Native Hawaiian and Other Pacific Islander	73	0.3%
Some other race	1,752	8.1%
Two or more races	2,718	12.5%

=== 2023 estimates ===
In 2023, the US Census Bureau estimated that 8.9% of the population were foreign-born. Of all people aged 5 or older, 80.8% spoke only English at home, 15.3% spoke Spanish, 2.2% spoke other Indo-European languages, 1.4% spoke Asian or Pacific Islander languages, and 0.4% spoke other languages. Of those aged 25 or older, 89.6% were high school graduates and 20.9% had a bachelor's degree.

The median household income was $55,302, and the per capita income was $32,643. About 13.2% of families and 19.2% of the population were below the poverty line.

== Economy ==
=== Personal income ===
The median income for a household in the town was $30,420, and the median income for a family was $36,650. Males had a median income of $35,037 versus $25,234 for females. The per capita income for the town was $16,020, lower than most of Southern California. About 16.2% of families and 19.5% of the population were below the poverty line, including 27.3% of those under age 18 and 9.3% of those age 65 or over.

=== Employment ===
Yucca Valley has the Twentynine Palms Base (US Marine Corps) 20 miles to the east and the Morongo Basin is home to temporary residents who work on the base.

=== Tourism ===
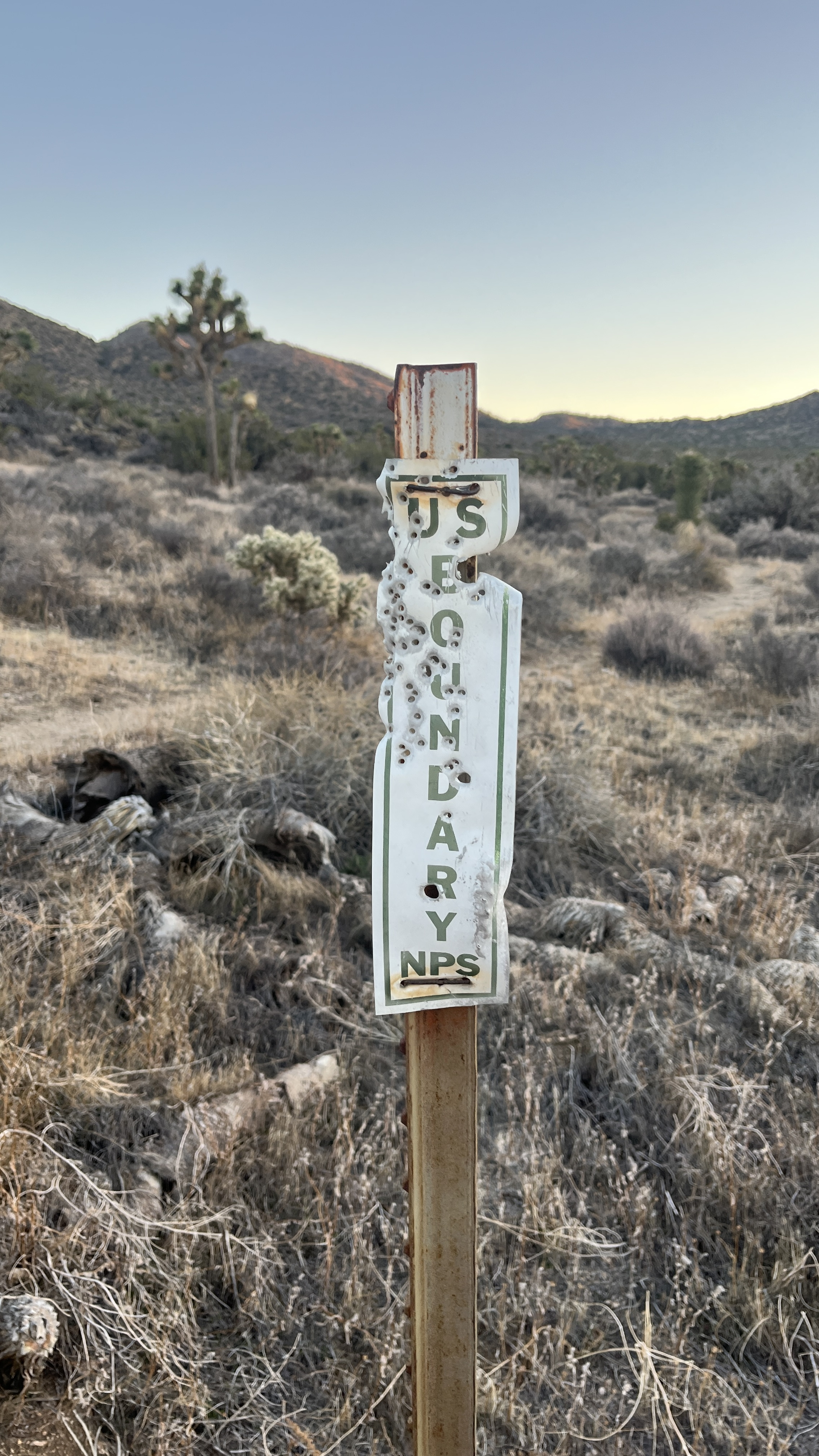
A Joshua Tree National Park border sign in Yucca Valley, CA

Yucca Valley borders Joshua Tree National Park. Amenities include a bowling alley, various retail stores and an "Old Town" area. On Grubstakes Day, held the day before Memorial Day, there is a parade.

Old Town Yucca Valley is located on Highway 62 at the intersection of Pioneertown Road. The California Welcome Center is located at 56711 Twentynine Palms Highway in Yucca Valley; it provides information on where to stay, eat and play while in the area.

Yucca Valley is home to the Desert Christ Park sculpture garden, as well as the geoglyph "Atlatl", created by artist Andrew Rogers.

== Government ==
=== Municipal ===
Yucca Valley is governed by a Town Council. The community's Mayor is Jeff Drozd. Other town council members are Mayor Pro-Tem Merl Abel and Council Members Jim Schooler, Rick Denison and Robert Lombardo.

Yucca Valley contracts its police and public safety services from the San Bernardino County Sheriff's Department. Fire suppression and ambulance services are provided by the San Bernardino County Fire Department and Cal Fire.

=== State and federal ===
In the California State Legislature, Yucca Valley is in the 19th senatorial district, represented by Republican Rosilicie Ochoa Bogh, and the 47th Assembly district, represented by Republican Greg Wallis.

In the United States House of Representatives, Yucca Valley is in California's 23rd congressional district, represented by Republican Jay Obernolte.

== Education ==
Public education in Yucca Valley is under the administration of the Morongo Unified School District. Yucca Valley has three neighborhood elementary schools (Onaga Elementary, Yucca Mesa Elementary, and Yucca Valley [Hope] Elementary), one middle school (La Contenta Middle School), and two high schools (Yucca Valley High School and Black Rock Continuation High School).

Private schools in Yucca Valley include Our Lady of the Desert, a Christian school for K–12; Valley Community Chapel School and Daycare offering Preschool, Kindergarten and before and after school Daycare; Joshua Springs Christian School, non-denominational affiliation for PK–12; Grace Christian School, Brethren affiliation for K–12; Hi-Desert SDA Elementary, a 1–6, Seventh Day Adventist affiliation school; and Yucca Valley Christian School, affiliated with The Assembly of God, for PK–12. Hope Academy lost its charter with the Morongo Unified School District in 2016 and was unable to find another charter and subsequently closed. Adult tutoring is also available in Yucca Valley, with tutoring information available at the Yucca Valley Public Library.

== Transportation ==
Yucca Valley has two major means of highway access; California State Route 62 (Twentynine Palms Highway) runs east–west and is the main thoroughfare through town and terminates at the south end at Interstate 10 and Parker Dam on the Arizona border at the east end. California State Route 247 (Old Woman Springs Road) begins in Yucca Valley and extends north through Barstow and terminates at Interstate 15. Basin Transit serves the area with scheduled bus service around town and the lower desert. The service connects passengers to the Palm Springs International Airport direct bus lines to Los Angeles. The area is served locally by the Yucca Valley Airport.

== Media ==
Yucca Valley is served by the bi-weekly Hi Desert Star newspaper.

There are several commercial radio stations with studios located in the Coachella Valley (Palm Springs) with local broadcast signals located in the Morongo Basin.

- 91.7 KHCS (Christian) broadcasts on 92.1,
- 92.1 KXCM (country) broadcasts on 96.3,
- 94.3 KNWZ "K-News" on 103.7 FM and 1250 AM,
- 106.9 KDGL (70s-90s hits)
- 106.1 KPLM (country)

There is one local station on 107.7 KCDZ (z107) with studios located in Joshua Tree.

There are several county run television repeaters (from Palm Springs, Riverside/San Bernardino and Greater Los Angeles) broadcasting from Pinto Mountain south of Twentynine Palms that can be received in the Yucca Mesa area but not in the city proper. Television service (and high speed cable internet) in town is provided by Charter Spectrum. WISP (wireless internet service provider) is offered from Mojave WiFi, Frontier and Flashbyte Digital.
