= East Highland, California =

East Highland, California may refer to:

- East Highland, a fictional place in TV series Euphoria
- East Highlands, a city of Highland, California
