= Highland, California =

City in California, United States

- City
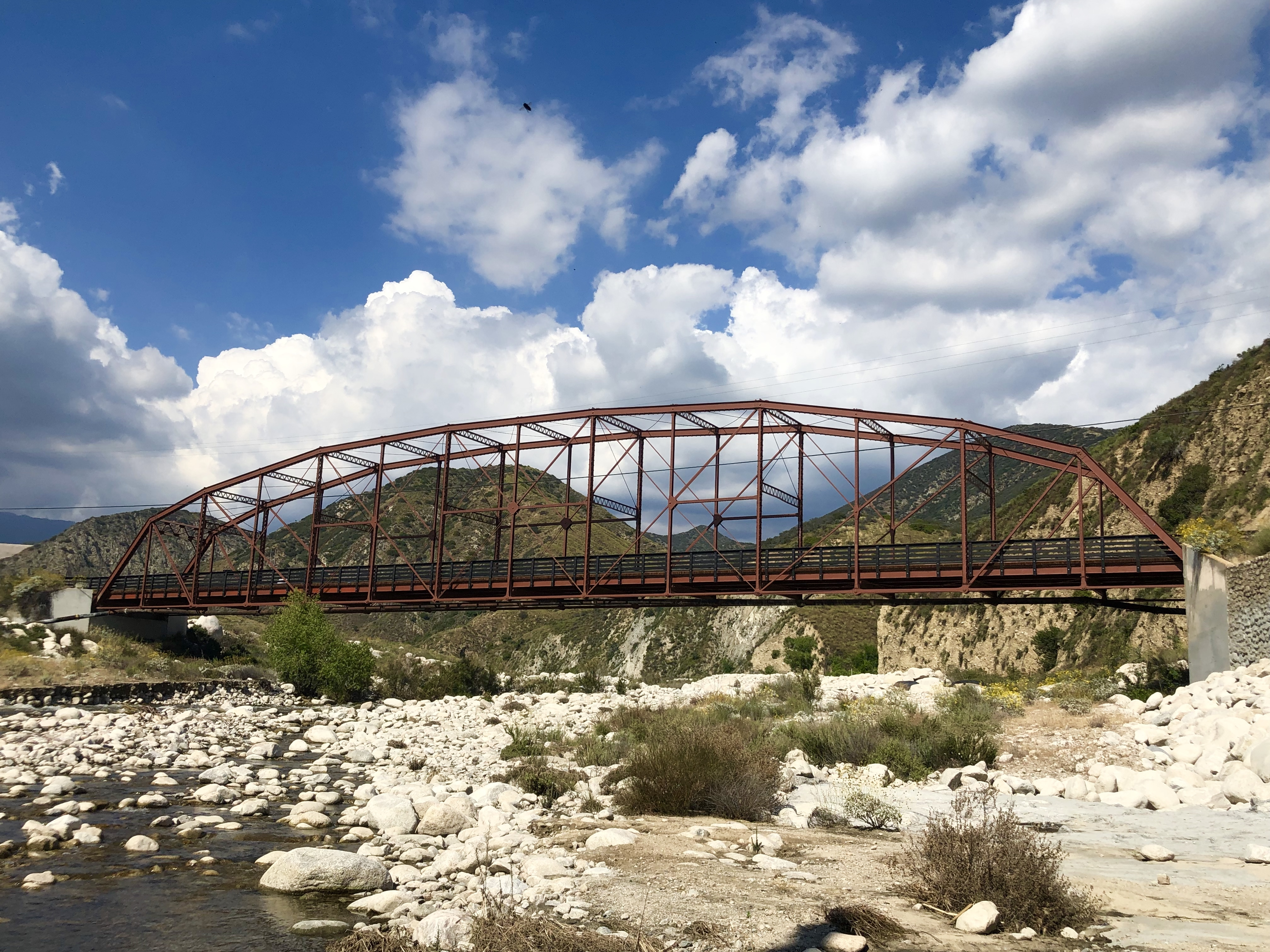
- Santa Ana River Bridge

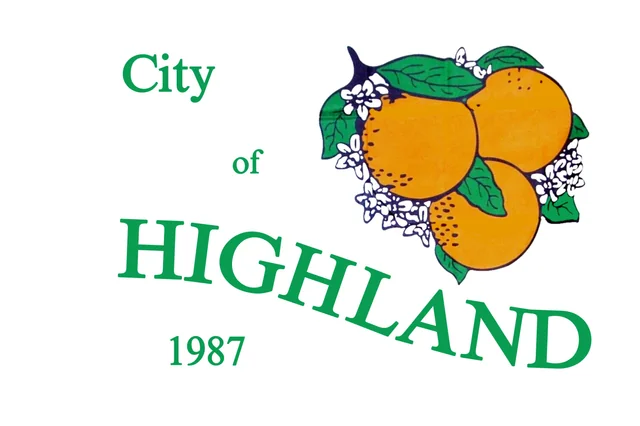
- Flag
- Interactive map of Highland, California
- Location in the United States
- Coordinates: 34°07′42″N 117°12′31″W
- Country: United States
- State: California
- County: San Bernardino
- Incorporated: November 24, 1987

Government
  - Type: City Council
  - City Manager: Carlos Zamano

Area
  - Total: 18.66 sq mi (48.34 km^{2})
  - Land: 18.57 sq mi (48.10 km^{2})
  - Water: 0.093 sq mi (0.24 km^{2}) 0.71%
- Elevation: 1,309 ft (399 m)

Population (2020)
  - Total: 56,999
  - Density: 3,070/sq mi (1,185/km^{2})
- Time zone: UTC-8 (PST)
  - Summer (DST): UTC-7 (PDT)
- ZIP code: 92346
- Area code: 909
- FIPS code: 06-33588
- GNIS feature IDs: 1652722, 2410759
- Website: www.highlandca.gov

Highland (inc. East Highlands) is a city in the Inland Empire region of San Bernardino County, California, United States located 65 miles east of Downtown Los Angeles and roughly 50 miles west of Palm Springs, California. The city's population, inclusive to its neighboring East Highlands community was 56,999 at the 2020 census.

== History ==
Located at the southern base of the San Bernardino Mountains lies the city of Highland. The city is divided into three main areas including Highland, East Highland and West Highland.

Henry Rabel, one of the area’s first settlers, bought over 100 acres of land in 1857 and built an 11-room hotel with bath houses for guests. The area became known as Rabel Springs. In 1858, pioneers Lewis Cram and Frederick Van Leuven arrived and constructed the Cram-Van Leuven ditch, extending from the Santa Ana River entrance to their land in East Highland. They began planting orchards of seedling oranges and other fruit trees in the early 1880s.

Santa Ana Canyon Road was the first road in the area, stretching 12 miles from San Bernardino and primarily used to transport supplies to the gold mines in Bear Valley. Today, the road is known as Fifth Street. Significant development in the area continued and was fueled by the citrus industry, a major economic driver in Southern California at the time.

In 1875, the Southern Pacific Railroad reached the valley, and by the following year, it crossed the southern portion of the valley. The first steam-powered line, which began serving the Highland area in 1888, ran from downtown San Bernardino to Harlem Springs in Highland.

The railroad brought more people and industries to the area, which led to the construction of orange and lemon packing houses at depots to prepare the harvests for transport. The town’s orange groves became plentiful due to the presence of railroads for transporting crops and access to water for irrigation. Highland became known for sourcing some of the finest navel oranges in the world because they were sweet and without seeds. Many orange varieties at that time were sour and used for making marmalade.

In 1891, Highland was officially classified as a townsite. By 1892, 166 miles of double-loop railroad tracks were built around the valley, forming a figure-eight shape, known as the Kite Loop. The Kite Loop started in Los Angeles and extended through the Santa Ana Valley. The slogan for the Kite Loop was, “No scene, twice seen.” Remnants of the old train depots and Kite Loop can be found in both Highland and East Highland.

The Highland Historic District on Palm Avenue encompasses the city’s oldest parts, including the original townsite, numerous packing houses, and the city’s historic commercial core. In 1987, Highland became incorporated as a California general law city.

== Demographics ==
Historical population
Census	Pop.	Note	%±
1970	12,669		—
1980	10,908		−13.9%
1990	34,439		215.7%
2000	44,605		29.5%
2010	53,104		19.1%
2020	56,999		7.3%
U.S. Decennial Census

=== Racial and ethnic composition ===
Highland city, California – Racial and ethnic composition Note: the US Census treats Hispanic/Latino as an ethnic category. This table excludes Latinos from the racial categories and assigns them to a separate category. Hispanics/Latinos may be of any race.
Race / Ethnicity (NH = Non-Hispanic)	Pop 2000	Pop 2010	Pop 2020	% 2000	% 2010	% 2020
White alone (NH)	18,619	16,347	13,300	41.74%	30.78%	23.33%
Black or African American alone (NH)	5,226	5,584	5,046	11.72%	10.52%	8.85%
Native American or Alaska Native alone (NH)	322	233	178	0.72%	0.44%	0.31%
Asian alone (NH)	2,638	3,812	4,580	5.91%	7.18%	8.04%
Native Hawaiian or Pacific Islander alone (NH)	132	159	145	0.30%	0.30%	0.25%
Other race alone (NH)	77	70	238	0.17%	0.13%	0.42%
Mixed race or Multiracial (NH)	1,249	1,343	1,888	2.80%	2.53%	3.31%
Hispanic or Latino (any race)	16,342	25,556	31,624	36.64%	48.12%	55.48%
Total	44,605	53,104	56,999	100.00%	100.00%	100.00%

=== 2020 census ===
As of the 2020 census, Highland had a population of 56,999 and a population density of 3,069.2 inhabitants per square mile (1,185.0/km^{2}). The median age was 33.6 years. The age distribution was 27.4% under the age of 18, 10.6% aged 18 to 24, 26.5% aged 25 to 44, 24.3% aged 45 to 64, and 11.2% aged 65 or older. For every 100 females, there were 95.4 males, and for every 100 females age 18 and over, there were 91.9 males age 18 and over.

The census reported that 99.4% of the population lived in households, 0.4% lived in non-institutionalized group quarters, and 0.2% were institutionalized. In all, 98.6% of residents lived in urban areas, while 1.4% lived in rural areas.

There were 16,656 households, of which 45.0% had children under the age of 18 living in them. Of all households, 52.6% were married-couple households, 7.1% were cohabiting couple households, 25.8% had a female householder with no spouse or partner present, and 14.4% had a male householder with no spouse or partner present. About 14.7% of households were one person households, and 6.3% had someone living alone who was 65 or older. The average household size was 3.4, and there were 13,426 families (80.6% of all households).

There were 17,109 housing units, of which 16,656 (97.4%) were occupied and 2.6% were vacant. Of occupied units, 63.3% were owner-occupied and 36.7% were renter-occupied. The homeowner vacancy rate was 0.7%, and the rental vacancy rate was 2.7%.

Racial composition as of the 2020 census
Race	Number	Percent
White	19,412	34.1%
Black or African American	5,320	9.3%
American Indian and Alaska Native	1,030	1.8%
Asian	4,733	8.3%
Native Hawaiian and Other Pacific Islander	157	0.3%
Some other race	17,226	30.2%
Two or more races	9,121	16.0%

=== Income and poverty ===
In 2023, the US Census Bureau estimated that the median household income was $77,979, and the per capita income was $34,323. About 12.7% of families and 16.7% of the population were below the poverty line.

=== 2010 census ===
At the 2010 census Highland had a population of 53,104. The population density was 2,811.3 inhabitants per square mile (1,085.4/km^{2}). The racial makeup of Highland was 27,836 (52.4%) White (30.8% Non-Hispanic White), 5,887 (11.1%) African American, 542 (1.0%) Native American, 3,954 (7.4%) Asian, 168 (0.3%) Pacific Islander, 11,826 (22.3%) from other races, and 2,891 (5.4%) from two or more races. Hispanic or Latino of any race were 25,556 persons (48.1%).

The census reported that 52,932 people (99.7% of the population) lived in households, 76 (0.1%) lived in non-institutionalized group quarters, and 96 (0.2%) were institutionalized.

There were 15,471 households, 7,922 (51.2%) had children under the age of 18 living in them, 8,475 (54.8%) were opposite-sex married couples living together, 2,884 (18.6%) had a female householder with no husband present, 1,183 (7.6%) had a male householder with no wife present. There were 1,129 (7.3%) unmarried opposite-sex partnerships, and 109 (0.7%) same-sex married couples or partnerships. 2,254 households (14.6%) were one person and 757 (4.9%) had someone living alone who was 65 or older. The average household size was 3.42. There were 12,542 families (81.1% of households); the average family size was 3.74.

The age distribution was 16,916 people (31.9%) under the age of 18, 5,900 people (11.1%) aged 18 to 24, 13,837 people (26.1%) aged 25 to 44, 12,357 people (23.3%) aged 45 to 64, and 4,094 people (7.7%) who were 65 or older. The median age was 30.6 years. For every 100 females, there were 95.1 males. For every 100 females age 18 and over, there were 91.3 males.

There were 16,578 housing units at an average density of 877.6 per square mile, of the occupied units 10,106 (65.3%) were owner-occupied and 5,365 (34.7%) were rented. The homeowner vacancy rate was 2.2%; the rental vacancy rate was 8.7%. 33,361 people (62.8% of the population) lived in owner-occupied housing units and 19,571 people (36.9%) lived in rental housing units.

== Climate ==
Climate data for Highland, California (1903-1967 averages)
Month	Jan	Feb	Mar	Apr	May	Jun	Jul	Aug	Sep	Oct	Nov	Dec	Year
Mean daily maximum °F (°C)	58.6 (14.8)	61.3 (16.3)	64.3 (17.9)	69.4 (20.8)	75.0 (23.9)	83.8 (28.8)	92.0 (33.3)	90.8 (32.7)	86.9 (30.5)	77.0 (25.0)	68.0 (20.0)	59.8 (15.4)	73.9 (23.3)
Mean daily minimum °F (°C)	38.5 (3.6)	40.2 (4.6)	41.7 (5.4)	45.3 (7.4)	48.8 (9.3)	54.4 (12.4)	62.3 (16.8)	62.5 (16.9)	59.5 (15.3)	51.4 (10.8)	44.9 (7.2)	40.3 (4.6)	49.2 (9.5)
Average precipitation inches (mm)	4.43 (113)	4.89 (124)	3.93 (100)	2.55 (65)	0.97 (25)	0.14 (3.6)	0.12 (3.0)	0.28 (7.1)	0.53 (13)	1.28 (33)	1.76 (45)	3.90 (99)	24.78 (630.7)
Average snowfall inches (cm)	1.7 (4.3)	0.3 (0.76)	1.1 (2.8)	0.1 (0.25)	0.0 (0.0)	0.0 (0.0)	0.0 (0.0)	0.0 (0.0)	0.0 (0.0)	0.0 (0.0)	0.3 (0.76)	0.5 (1.3)	4.0 (10)
Source: "Western Regional Climate Center".

== Education ==
Highland is served by two public school districts: Redlands Unified and San Bernardino City Unified School District (the boundaries are generally defined by City Creek; residents east of City Creek are in the Redlands Unified School District while those west of City Creek are served by San Bernardino City Unified School District).

Highland is home to a library and environmental learning center. The Highland Sam J. Racadio Library and Environmental Learning Center is a gold-rated LEED building. It holds thousands of books, CDs, DVDs, and other items. It offers free computer access and Wi-fi. It has a rooftop garden and is home to animals, amphibians, and reptiles from around the globe.

Local colleges and universities include: Loma Linda University, University of Redlands, California State University's San Bernardino campus, and the two-campus San Bernardino Community College District (which includes Crafton Hills College in Yucaipa and San Bernardino Valley College).

== Government ==
=== Local ===
Highland was founded as a townsite in 1891 and incorporated as a California general law city in November 1987. It follows a City Manager, City Council form of government with the City Manager appointed by the City Council.

=== State and federal ===
In the California State Senate, Highland is split between the 19th senatorial district, represented by Republican Rosilicie Ochoa Bogh, and the 29th senatorial district, represented by Democrat Eloise Reyes.

In the California State Assembly, Highland is split between the 45th Assembly district, represented by Democrat James Ramos, and the 47th Assembly district, represented by Republican Greg Wallis.

In the United States House of Representatives, Highland is split between California's 33rd congressional district, represented by Democrat Pete Aguilar, and California's 23rd congressional district, represented by Republican Jay Obernolte.

== Public safety ==
The San Bernardino County Sheriff's Department provides contracted police services to the city of Highland from their regional station located at 26985 Base Line Road. The new 30,000-square-foot (2,800 m^{2}) police station was built and finally occupied in June 2011.

The city has contracted with Cal Fire to operate its fire services (three stations) since its incorporation.

== Sister cities ==
- (Republic of Artsakh) Berdzor, Artsakh Republic

== See also ==
- Redlands, California
- Colton, California
- San Bernardino, California
