= California's 47th district =

California's 47th district may refer to:

- California's 47th congressional district
- California's 47th State Assembly district
