= Eleanor Miller =

California politician

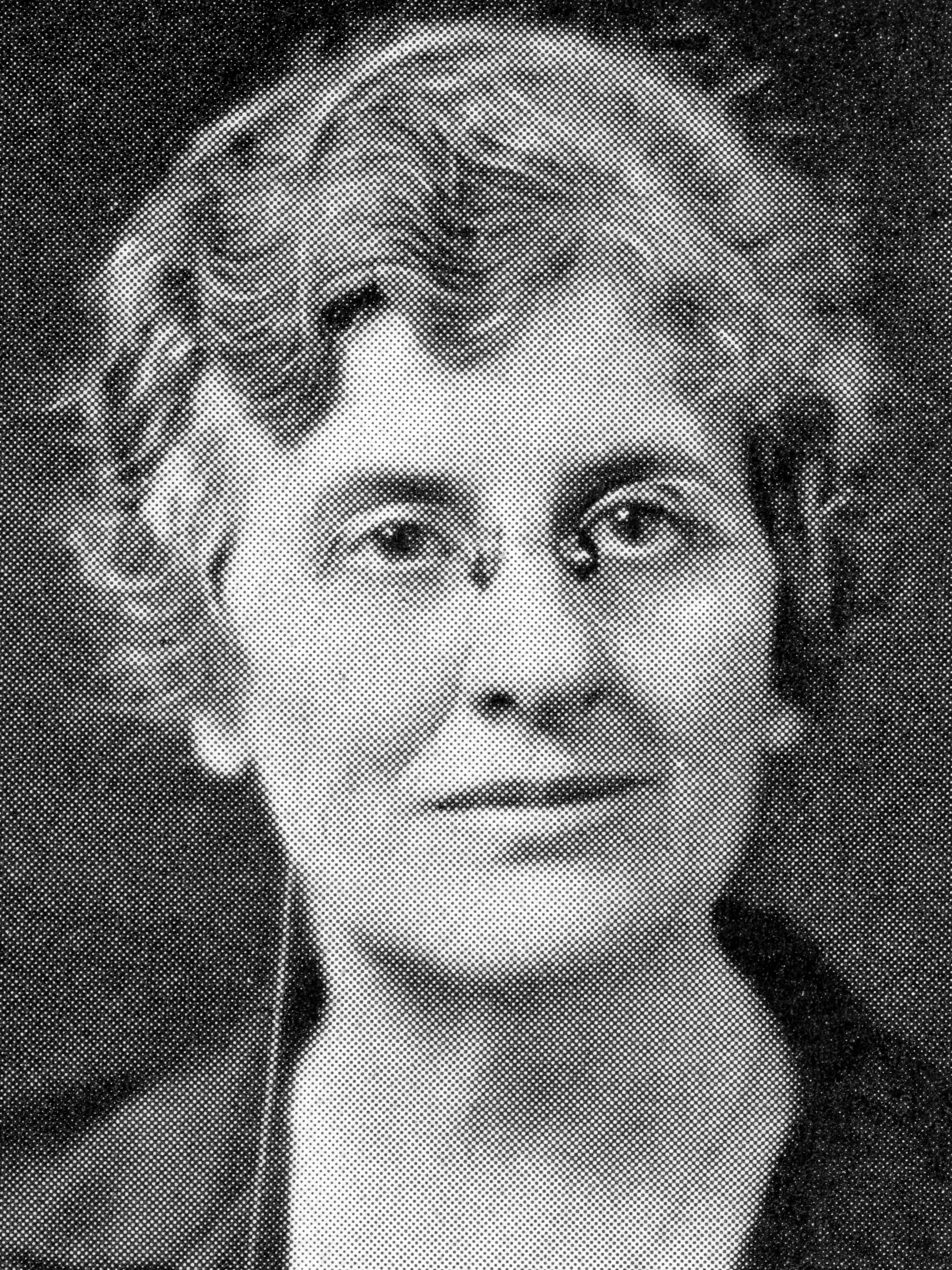

Member of the California State Assembly
- In office January 8, 1923 – January 4, 1943
- Preceded by: Franklin D. Mather
- Succeeded by: Willis Sargent
- Constituency: 67th district (1923–1931); 47th district (1931–1943)

Personal details
- Born: March 7, 1868 Industry, Illinois, U.S.
- Died: December 19, 1943 (aged 75) Pasadena, California, U.S.

Eleanor Miller (March 7, 1868 – December 19, 1943) was a teacher and state legislator in California. A Republican, she was the fifth woman elected to the California legislature. She was elected consecutively from 1922 until 1940. She founded the Eleanor Miller School of Expression which had locations in St. Paul, Minnesota and Los Angeles, California. She wrote the memoir When Memory Calls (1936) about her life, including her travels to Europe and the Near East. The book includes pen drawings by Lewis D. Johnson.

She was born in Industry, Illinois. She lived in Pasadena from 1911 until her death. She lived at 251 South Oakland Avenue.
