= Desert Christ Park =

Sculpture garden in California

Coordinates: 34°7′43″N 116°26′23″W

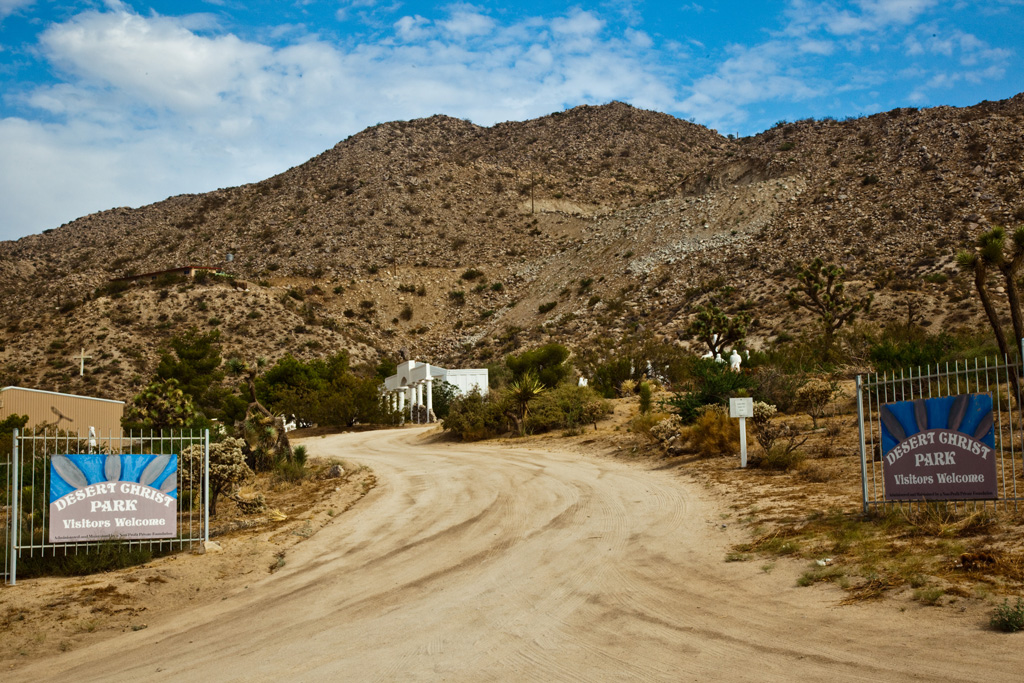
- Established: 1951
- Location: 56200 Sunnyslope Dr., Yucca Valley, CA United States.
- Type: sculpture park
- Website: www.desertchristpark.org

Desert Christ Park is a 3.5-acre (14,000 m^{2}) sculpture garden in Yucca Valley, California. The park was sculpted and created by Antone Martin, a former aircraft worker who died in 1961 at the age of 74. Martin started sculpting the figures out of steel-reinforced concrete during the height of the Cold War atomic bomb scare of the mid-1940s, hoping that the sculptures would inspire global peace. Sculptures include The Twelve Apostles, Martha, Mary, angels, and a 15-foot-tall, 3 ton statue of Jesus, reminiscent of Rio de Janeiro's famous and much larger hilltop Christ the Redeemer. The park was neglected between 1988 and 1996, while the ACLU sued San Bernardino County for separation of church and state issues, after which a nonprofit foundation took over and renovated the park.
