= Cheryl Brown =

American politician (born 1944)

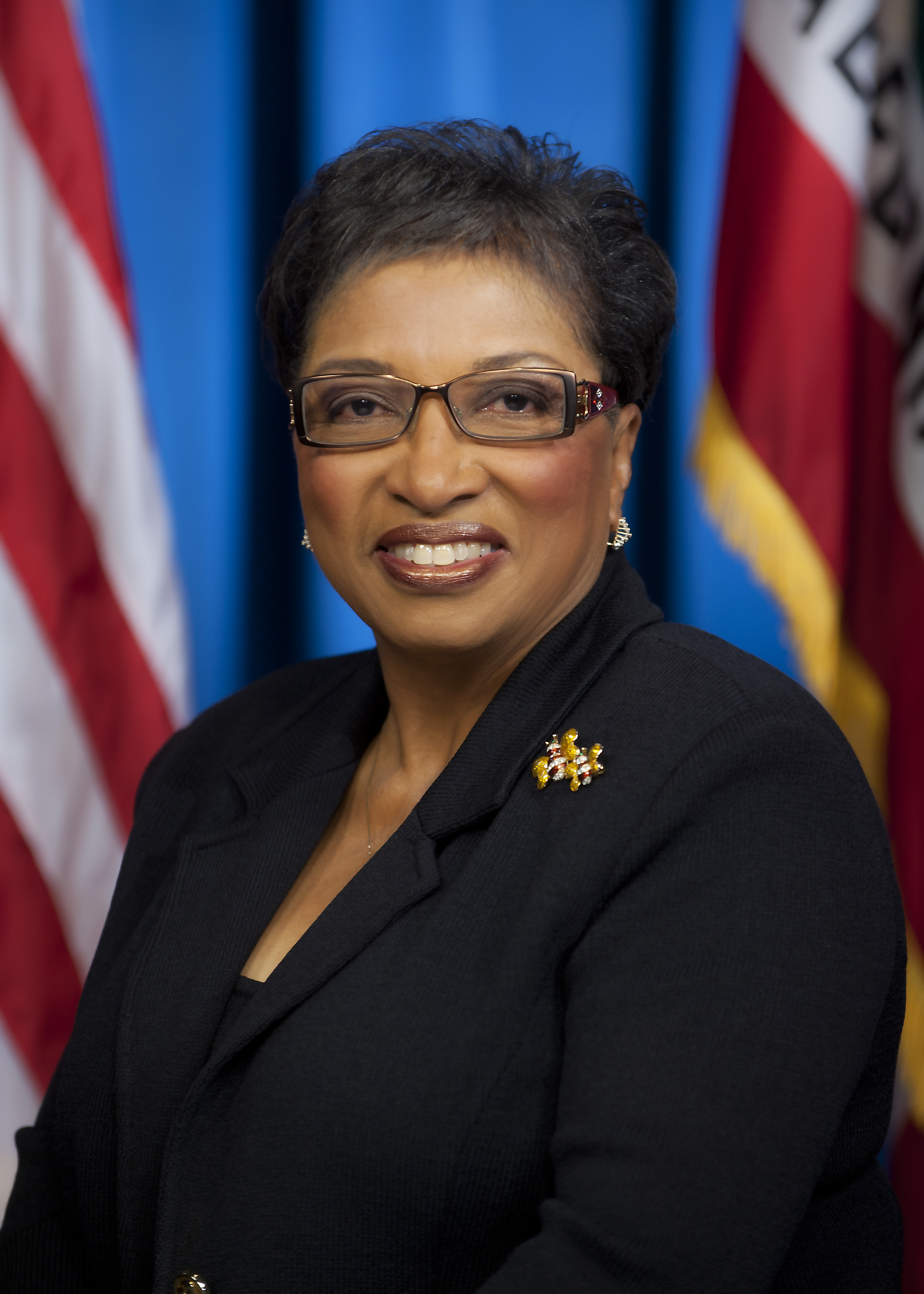

Member of the California State Assembly from the 47th district
- In office December 3, 2012 – December 5, 2016
- Preceded by: Holly Mitchell (redistricted)
- Succeeded by: Eloise Reyes

Personal details
- Born: February 11, 1944 (age 82) Ayer, Massachusetts
- Party: Democratic
- Spouse: Hardy Brown Sr. (m. 1964)
- Children: 4
- Education: Cal State, San Bernardino

Cheryl Renee Brown (born February 11, 1944) is an American politician who served in the California State Assembly, representing the 47th Assembly District, encompassing parts of the Inland Empire. She is a Democrat.

In 2016, Brown was defeated in her bid for reelection to a third term by fellow Democrat Eloise Reyes. Prior to being elected to the assembly, she was a newspaper publisher.

During her first term, Brown voted against climate legislation. In response, the progressive group California Donor Table sought to unseat her by supporting Eloise Reyes.

== Electoral history ==
2012 California State Assembly 47th district election
Primary election
Party	Candidate	Votes	%
Democratic	Joe Baca Jr.	11,033	42.3
Democratic	Cheryl Brown	7,566	29.0
Republican	Jeane Ensley	5,787	22.2
Republican	Thelma E. Beach	1,685	6.5
Total votes		26,071	100.0
General election
Democratic	Cheryl Brown	53,434	55.7
Democratic	Joe Baca Jr.	42,475	44.3
Total votes		95,909	100.0
Democratic hold			

2014 California State Assembly 47th district election
Primary election
Party	Candidate	Votes	%
Democratic	Cheryl Brown (incumbent)	12,643	68.3
Democratic	Gil Navarro	5,854	31.6
Republican	Kelly J. Chastain (write-in)	32	0.2
Total votes		18,529	100.0
General election
Democratic	Cheryl Brown (incumbent)	23,632	56.9
Democratic	Gil Navarro	17,875	43.1
Total votes		41,507	100.0
Democratic hold			

2016 California State Assembly 47th district election
Primary election
Party	Candidate	Votes	%
Democratic	Cheryl Brown (incumbent)	25,165	44.1
Democratic	Eloise Reyes	20,342	35.6
Republican	Aissa Chanel Sanchez	11,613	20.3
Total votes		57,120	100.0
General election
Democratic	Eloise Reyes	62,432	54.6
Democratic	Cheryl Brown (incumbent)	51,994	45.4
Total votes		114,426	100.0
Democratic hold			
