= Willis Sargent =

American politician

Member of the California State Assembly from the 47th district
- In office January 4, 1943 - January 8, 1945
- Preceded by: Eleanor Miller
- Succeeded by: Albert I. Stewart

Personal details
- Born: October 11, 1896 Syracuse, New York
- Died: August 22, 1976 (aged 79) Wellesley Island, New York
- Party: Republican
- Spouse: Ann Haughton (m. 1936)
- Education: Yale College (BA); Harvard Law School (JD)

Military service
- Branch/service: United States Army
- Battles/wars: World War I

Willis Hubbard Sargent was elected to the NY Assembly in 1925 and served 8 years through 1933. He served 1 term as President of the Syracuse Common Council 1934-1935. He served in the California State Assembly for the 47th district from 1943 to 1945 and during World War I he served in the United States Army.
