= Teresa Patterson Hughes =

American politician (1932–2011)

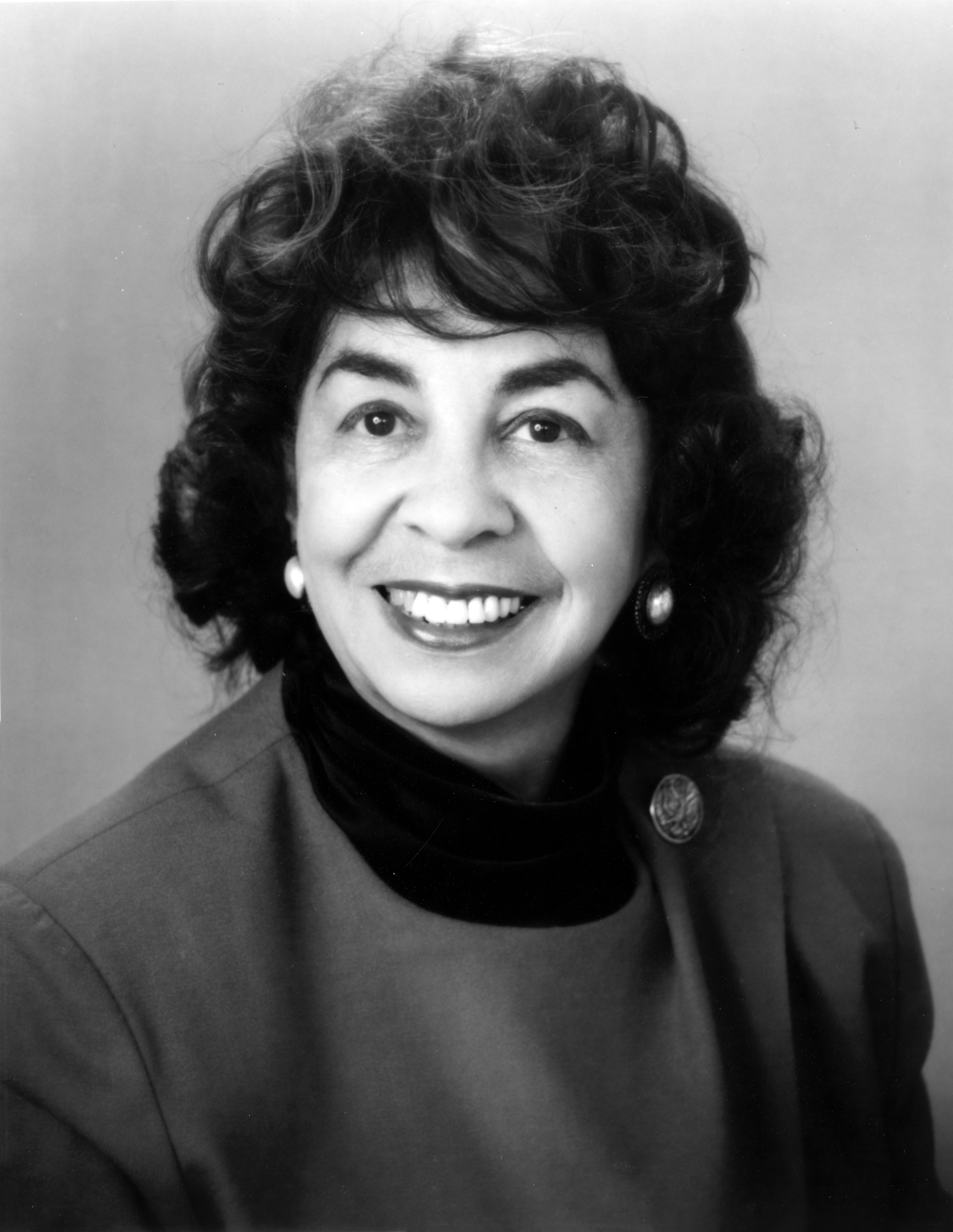
- Official portrait, 1997

Member of the California Senate from the 25th district
- In office December 7, 1992 – November 30, 2000
- Preceded by: Bill Leonard (redistricting)
- Succeeded by: Edward Vincent

Member of the California State Assembly from the 47th district
- In office July 22, 1975 – November 30, 1992
- Preceded by: Bill Greene
- Succeeded by: Gwen Moore (redistricting)

Personal details
- Born: Teresa Cecilia Patterson; October 3, 1932 New York, New York
- Died: November 13, 2011 (aged 79) Castro Valley, California
- Resting place: Rose Hill Memorial Park
- Party: Democratic
- Spouse(s): George V. Hughes (d.); Frank Staggers Sr.
- Children: Vincent G. Hughes, Deirdre Hill
- Education: Hunter College; New York University; Claremont Graduate School and University
- Occupation: Elected Official
- Profession: Teacher/College Professor

Teresa Patterson Hughes (October 3, 1932 – November 13, 2011) was an American politician and educator. A member of the Democratic Party, she served from 1992 to 2000 as a California State Senator, representing 25th district. Prior to joining the Senate, from 1975 to 1992, Hughes represented the 47th Assembly District. Hughes is renowned for her substantial contributions to the improvement of elementary, secondary and post-secondary education in California and championing educational policy and reform.

== Early life and education ==
Teresa Cecilia Patterson was born on October 3, 1932. She grew up in Harlem. Her father, Rogers Patterson, was from Natchez, Mississippi. He worked as a chauffeur and truck driver. Her mother, Leila Patterson (née Mitchell), was from Albany, Georgia. Leila graduated from Allen Normal School and worked as a preschool teacher and homemaker. Teresa attended St. Joseph of the Holy Family School and Cathedral High School in New York City. She went on to attend Hunter College where she majored in physiology and public health and took graduate courses in sociology. Hughes later earned a Masters of Arts degree in educational administration from New York University, School of Education. Thereafter, she received a Ph.D. in educational administration from Claremont Graduate School and University, with her dissertation discussing the perceptions of black and white elementary school administrators.

== Career ==
=== Educator ===
After graduating from college, Teresa worked as a social worker. Subsequently, she became a public school teacher. After several years of teaching in the classroom, Hughes became an assistant superintendent in the New York City public schools. In 1969, Teresa relocated to Los Angeles to pursue her doctorate. From 1969 to 1975 Hughes worked as an assistant professor of education at California State University, Los Angeles. Thereafter, she worked as an educational and legislative consultant for the California State Commission for Teacher Preparation and Licensing.

=== Elected official ===
Dr. Hughes was a Democratic member of the California State Assembly from 1975 to 1992, sitting in the 47th District (comprising portions of South Central L.A., Bell, Cudahy, Downey, Huntington Park and Compton). From 1993 to 2000 she served in the California State Senate representing the 25th District. Teresa, was the second Black American woman to serve in the California State Senate. She retired in 2000, due to term limits, after serving in the California State Legislature for over 25 years. At the time of her death, Dr. Hughes was the woman with the longest record of service in the California State Legislature. She was also the first woman and first Black American to serve on the Senate Rules Committee. Dr. Hughes was also a founding member and the first chair of the bipartisan California Legislature's Women's Caucus. In furtherance of her commitment to higher education, Dr. Hughes served, by appointment of President Jimmy Carter, on the board of the Student Loan Marketing Association (SALLIE MAE).

== Recognition and legacy ==
- Teresa Hughes Elementary Math and Science Magnet School, Cudahy, California. At a 1988 renaming ceremony it was stated that: "Teresa Hughes is an ardent fighter for education. She's the best friend we can have in education."
- Co-author of Hughes-Hart Education Reform Act of 1983 which set State graduation standards, raised teachers’ salaries and requirements, created a mentor teacher program and lengthened the school day and year.
- Author bill dedicating $800 million in bond money for school construction and the creation of a California School of the Arts.
- Author of bill providing funding for the California Science Center and School.
- Authored the bill that established the Cooperative Care Agencies Resources for Education.
- Awarded honorary doctorate, Charles Drew Medical School.
