= California's 47th State Assembly district =

American legislative district

Current assemblymember
Greg Wallis; R–Rancho Mirage
- Population (2020) • Voting age • Citizen voting age: 518,651; 414,224; 366,475
- Demographics: 61.92% White; 4.35% Black; 27.30% Latino; 3.89% Asian; 0.91% Native American; 0.11% Hawaiian/Pacific Islander; 0% other; 0% remainder of multiracial
- Registered voters: 309,416
- Registration: 39.97% Democratic; 33.56% Republican; 18.51% No party preference

California's 47th State Assembly district is one of 80 California State Assembly districts. It is currently represented by Republican Greg Wallis.

== District profile ==
Prior to the 2022 election, the district was located in the heart of the Inland Empire. The heavily Latino district was anchored by Fontana, while Rialto and San Bernardino also comprised sizable portions of its population.

Following redistricting in 2021, the district became centered around the Coachella Valley in Riverside County and the High Desert in San Bernardino County.

Riverside County – 18.1%

- Banning
- Beaumont
- Calimesa
- Cathedral City
- Desert Hot Springs
- Indian Wells
- La Quinta
- Palm Desert
- Palm Springs
- Rancho Mirage

San Bernardino County – 6.3%

- Morongo Valley
- Highland – 21.2%
- Redlands – 13.9%
- Yucaipa
- Yucca Valley

== Election results from statewide races ==
Year	Office	Results
2022	Governor	Newsom 51.1 – 48.9
2022	Senator	Padilla 52.4 – 47.6%
2021	Recall	No 65.8 – 34.2%
2020	President	Biden 66.5 – 31.2%
2018	Governor	Newsom 67.4 – 32.6%
2018	Senator	Feinstein 54.8 – 45.8%
2016	President	Clinton 70.1 – 24.8%
2016	Senator	Sanchez 50.7 – 49.3%
2014	Governor	Brown 65.0 – 35.0%
2012	President	Obama 71.5 – 26.5%
2012	Senator	Feinstein 72.1 – 27.9%

== List of assembly members representing the district ==
Due to redistricting, the 47th district has been moved around different parts of the state. The current iteration resulted from the 2021 redistricting by the California Citizens Redistricting Commission.

Assembly members	Party	Years served	Counties represented	Notes
Charles D. Douglas	Republican	January 5, 1885 – January 3, 1887	San Francisco	
Thomas F. Mitchell	Democratic	January 3, 1887 – January 7, 1889	San Francisco	
G. W. Burnett	Democratic	January 7, 1889 – January 5, 1891	San Francisco	
John T. Stelz	Republican	January 5, 1891 – January 2, 1893	San Francisco	
Aaron Bretz	Democratic	January 2, 1893 – January 7, 1895	Alameda	
James A. Waymire	Republican	January 7, 1895 – January 2, 1899	Alameda	
Joseph R. Knowland	Republican	January 2, 1899 – January 5, 1903	Alameda	
Joseph Clement Bates Jr.	Republican	January 5, 1903 – January 7, 1907	Alameda	
Frank Otis	Republican	January 7, 1907 – January 2, 1911	Alameda	
Sumner Crosby	Republican	January 2, 1911 – January 6, 1913	Alameda	
George Alexander Clarke	Republican	January 6, 1913 – January 4, 1915	Mariposa, Tuolumne, Mono, Inyo	
Maurice B. Browne	Democratic	January 4, 1915 – January 8, 1917	Mariposa, Tuolumne, Mono, Inyo	
Dan E. Williams	Republican	January 8, 1917 – January 6, 1919	Mariposa, Tuolumne, Mono, Inyo	
Maurice B. Browne	Democratic	January 6, 1919 – January 3, 1921	Mariposa, Tuolumne, Mono, Inyo	
John Calvin Webster	Republican	January 3, 1921 – January 8, 1923	Mariposa, Tuolumne, Mono, Inyo	
George Alexander Clarke	Republican	January 8, 1923 – January 5, 1925	Mariposa, Tuolumne, Mono, Inyo	
Maurice B. Browne	Democratic	January 5, 1925 – January 3, 1927	Mariposa, Tuolumne, Mono, Inyo	
Dan E. Williams	Republican	January 3, 1927 – January 5, 1931	Mariposa, Tuolumne, Mono, Inyo	
Augustus F. Jewett Jr.	Republican	January 5, 1931 – January 2, 1933	Kings, Tulare	
Eleanor Miller	Republican	January 2, 1933 – January 4, 1943	Los Angeles	
Willis Sargent	Republican	January 4, 1943 – January 8, 1945	Los Angeles	
Albert I. Stewart	Republican	January 8, 1945 – January 5, 1959	Los Angeles	
Bruce V. Reagan	Republican	January 5, 1959 – January 7, 1963	Los Angeles	
Frank D. Lanterman	Republican	January 7, 1963 – November 30, 1974	Los Angeles	
Bill Greene	Democratic	December 2, 1974 – April 7, 1975	Los Angeles	Resigned after winning a special election in the 29th district.
Vacant		April 7, 1975 – July 22, 1975	Los Angeles	
Teresa Patterson Hughes	Democratic	July 22, 1975 – November 30, 1992	Los Angeles	Sworn in after winning special election to fill the vacant left by Greene after he was sworn in the California State Senate.
Gwen Moore	Democratic	December 7, 1992 – November 30, 1994	Los Angeles	
Kevin Murray	Democratic	December 5, 1994 – November 30, 1998	Los Angeles	
Herb Wesson	Democratic	December 7, 1998 – November 30, 2004	Los Angeles	
Karen Bass	Democratic	December 6, 2004 – November 30, 2010	Los Angeles	
Holly Mitchell	Democratic	December 6, 2010 – November 30, 2012	Los Angeles	
Cheryl Brown	Democratic	December 3, 2012 – November 30, 2016	San Bernardino	
Eloise Reyes	Democratic	December 5, 2016 – November 30, 2022	San Bernardino	
Greg Wallis	Republican	December 5, 2022 – present	Riverside, San Bernardino	

== Election results (1990–present) ==
=== 2024 ===
2024 California State Assembly 47th district election
Primary election
Party	Candidate	Votes	%
Republican	Greg Wallis (incumbent)	58,312	48.6
Democratic	Christy Holstege	55,677	46.4
Democratic	Gary Michaels	6,115	5.1
Total votes		120,104	100.0
General election
Republican	Greg Wallis (incumbent)	119,072	51.2
Democratic	Christy Holstege	113,538	48.8
Total votes		232,610	100.0
Republican hold			

=== 2022 ===
2022 California State Assembly 47th district election
Primary election
Party	Candidate	Votes	%
Democratic	Christy Holstege	51,169	46.5
Republican	Greg Wallis	37,996	34.5
Republican	Gary Michaels	12,716	11.6
Democratic	Jamie Swain	8,200	7.4
Total votes		110,081	100.0
General election
Republican	Greg Wallis	84,752	50.03
Democratic	Christy Holstege	84,667	49.97
Total votes		169,419	100.00
Republican gain from Democratic			

=== 2020 ===
2020 California State Assembly 47th district election
Primary election
Party	Candidate	Votes	%
Democratic	Eloise Reyes (incumbent)	45,618	71.0
Republican	Matthew Gordon	18,649	29.0
Total votes		64,267	100.0
General election
Democratic	Eloise Reyes (incumbent)	109,635	69.0
Republican	Matthew Gordon	49,170	31.0
Total votes		158,805	100.0
Democratic hold			

=== 2018 ===
2018 California State Assembly 47th district election
Primary election
Party	Candidate	Votes	%
Democratic	Eloise Reyes (incumbent)	30,629	100.0
Total votes		30,629	100.0
General election
Democratic	Eloise Reyes (incumbent)	77,458	100.0
Total votes		77,458	100.0
Democratic hold			

=== 2016 ===
2016 California State Assembly 47th district election
Primary election
Party	Candidate	Votes	%
Democratic	Cheryl Brown (incumbent)	25,165	44.1
Democratic	Eloise Reyes	20,342	35.6
Republican	Aissa Chanel Sanchez	11,613	20.3
Total votes		57,120	100.0
General election
Democratic	Eloise Reyes	62,432	54.6
Democratic	Cheryl Brown (incumbent)	51,994	45.4
Total votes		114,426	100.0
Democratic hold			

=== 2014 ===
2014 California State Assembly 47th district election
Primary election
Party	Candidate	Votes	%
Democratic	Cheryl Brown (incumbent)	12,643	68.3
Democratic	Gil Navarro	5,854	31.6
Republican	Kelly J. Chastain (write-in)	32	0.2
Total votes		18,529	100.0
General election
Democratic	Cheryl Brown (incumbent)	23,632	56.9
Democratic	Gil Navarro	17,875	43.1
Total votes		41,507	100.0
Democratic hold			

=== 2012 ===
2012 California State Assembly 47th district election
Primary election
Party	Candidate	Votes	%
Democratic	Joe Baca, Jr.	11,033	42.3
Democratic	Cheryl Brown	7,566	29.0
Republican	Jeane Ensley	5,787	22.2
Republican	Thelma E. Beach	1,685	6.5
Total votes		26,071	100.0
General election
Democratic	Cheryl Brown	53,434	55.7
Democratic	Joe Baca, Jr.	42,475	44.3
Total votes		95,909	100.0
Democratic hold			

=== 2010 ===
2010 California State Assembly 47th district election
Party	Candidate	Votes	%
Democratic	Holly Mitchell	93,541	80.7
Republican	Lady Cage	17,195	14.8
Libertarian	Sean P. McGary	5,305	4.5
Total votes		116,041	100.0
Democratic hold			

=== 2008 ===
2008 California State Assembly 47th district election
Party	Candidate	Votes	%
Democratic	Karen Bass (incumbent)	134,003	85.0
Republican	Lady Cage-Barile	23,642	15.0
Total votes		157,645	100.0
Democratic hold			

=== 2006 ===
2006 California State Assembly 47th district election
Party	Candidate	Votes	%
Democratic	Karen Bass (incumbent)	84,674	84.9
Republican	Jeffers Dodge	15,096	15.1
Total votes		99,770	100.0
Democratic hold			

=== 2004 ===
2004 California State Assembly 47th district election
Party	Candidate	Votes	%
Democratic	Karen Bass	118,495	80.8
Republican	Dale V. Everett	21,485	14.6
Libertarian	Peter "Pedro" De Baets	6,730	4.6
Total votes		146,710	100.0
Democratic hold			

=== 2002 ===
2002 California State Assembly 47th district election
Party	Candidate	Votes	%
Democratic	Herb Wesson (incumbent)	72,792	81.9
Republican	Jonathan Leonard	13,395	15.1
Libertarian	Keith Clemens	2,757	3.0
Total votes		88,944	100.0
Democratic hold			

=== 2000 ===
2000 California State Assembly 47th district election
Party	Candidate	Votes	%
Democratic	Herb Wesson (incumbent)	100,328	83.3
Republican	Jonathan Leonard	16,137	13.4
Libertarian	Scott Pacer	4,027	3.3
Total votes		120,492	100.0
Democratic hold			

=== 1998 ===
1998 California State Assembly 47th district election
Party	Candidate	Votes	%
Democratic	Herb Wesson	80,222	84.0
Republican	Jonathan Leonard	12,666	13.3
Libertarian	Eric Michael Fine	2,596	2.7
Total votes		95,484	100.0
Democratic hold			

=== 1996 ===
1996 California State Assembly 47th district election
Party	Candidate	Votes	%
Democratic	Kevin Murray (incumbent)	86,763	79.9
Republican	Jonathan Leonard	17,616	16.2
Libertarian	Bob Weber	4,252	3.9
Total votes		108,631	100.0
Democratic hold			

=== 1994 ===
1994 California State Assembly 47th district election
Party	Candidate	Votes	%
Democratic	Kevin Murray	66,884	71.8
Republican	Jonathan Leonard	17,754	19.1
Peace and Freedom	Tamara Taleebah	4,424	4.7
Libertarian	Kevin C. Murphy	4,077	4.4
Total votes		93,139	100.0
Democratic hold			

=== 1992 ===
1992 California State Assembly 47th district election
Party	Candidate	Votes	%
Democratic	Gwen Moore (incumbent)	105,838	80.8
Republican	Jonathan Leonard	18,344	14.0
Libertarian	Chuck Hammill	4,969	3.8
Peace and Freedom	Yassin A. Saededdin	1,834	1.4
Total votes		130,985	100.0
Democratic hold			

=== 1990 ===
1990 California State Assembly 47th district election
Party	Candidate	Votes	%
Democratic	Teresa Patterson Hughes (incumbent)	13,880	100.0
Total votes		13,880	100.0
Democratic hold			

== See also ==
- California State Assembly
- California State Assembly districts
- Districts in California
