= Mitochondrial ribosomal protein L22 =

Protein-coding gene in the species Homo sapiens

MRPL22
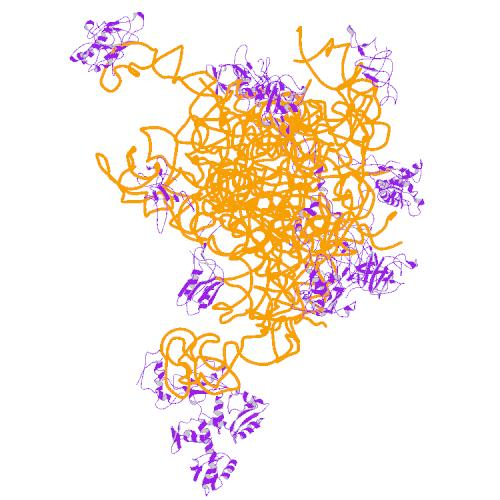

Identifiers
- Aliases: MRPL22, L22mt, MRP-L22, MRP-L25, RPML25, HSPC158, mitochondrial ribosomal protein L22
- External IDs: OMIM: 611835; MGI: 1333794; GeneCards: MRPL22
Available structures
PDB	Ortholog search: PDBe RCSB
PDB	List of PDB id codes 3J7Y

Gene location (Human)
Chr.	Chromosome 5 (human)
Band	5q33.2	Start	154,941,073 bp
Band	5q33.2	End	154,969,411 bp

Gene location (Mouse)
Chr.	Chromosome 11 (mouse)
Band	11|11 B1.3	Start	58,062,487 bp
Band	11|11 B1.3	End	58,070,391 bp
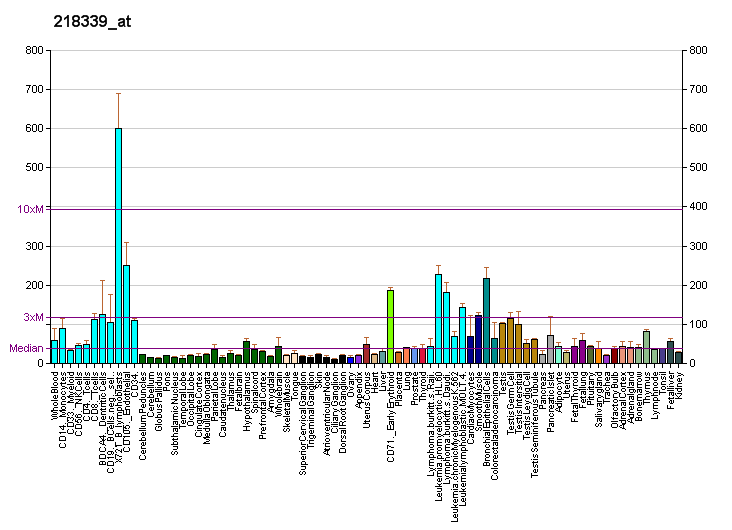
RNA expression pattern
Bgee	Human / Mouse (ortholog); Top expressed in: mucosa of transverse colon; left ventricle; right auricle of heart; olfactory zone of nasal mucosa; islet of Langerhans; right ventricle; right adrenal gland; left testis; apex of heart; left adrenal gland / Top expressed in: morula; proximal tubule; right kidney; adrenal gland; epiblast; blastocyst; embryo; neural tube; embryo; quadriceps femoris muscle; More reference expression data
BioGPS	More reference expression data
Gene ontology
Molecular function	structural constituent of ribosome; RNA binding
Cellular component	mitochondrial inner membrane; large ribosomal subunit; ribosome; mitochondrion; mitochondrial large ribosomal subunit
Biological process	mitochondrial translational elongation; mitochondrial translational termination; protein biosynthesis; ribosome assembly
Sources:Amigo / QuickGO
Orthologs
Databases	NCBI: entry; OMA: entry
Species	Human	Mouse
Entrez	29093	216767
Ensembl	ENSG00000082515	ENSMUSG00000020514
UniProt	Q9NWU5	Q8BU88
RefSeq (mRNA)	NM_014180; NM_001014990	NM_175001
RefSeq (protein)	NP_001014990; NP_054899	NP_778166; NP_001390902
Location (UCSC)	Chr 5: 154.94 – 154.97 Mb	Chr 11: 58.06 – 58.07 Mb
PubMed search
- Wikidata
View/Edit Human	View/Edit Mouse

39S ribosomal protein L22, mitochondrial is a protein that in humans is encoded by the MRPL22 gene.

Mammalian mitochondrial ribosomal proteins are encoded by nuclear genes and help in protein synthesis within the mitochondrion. Mitochondrial ribosomes (mitoribosomes) consist of a small 28S subunit and a large 39S subunit. They have an estimated 75% protein to rRNA composition compared to prokaryotic ribosomes, where this ratio is reversed. Another difference between mammalian mitoribosomes and prokaryotic ribosomes is that the latter contain a 5S rRNA. Among different species, the proteins comprising the mitoribosome differ greatly in sequence, and sometimes in biochemical properties, which prevents easy recognition by sequence homology. This gene encodes a 39S subunit protein that belongs to the L22 ribosomal protein family. A pseudogene corresponding to this gene is found on chromosome 4q. Two transcript variants encoding different isoforms have been found for this gene.
