= Yucca Valley Airport =

Airport in California, USA

- IATA: none; ICAO: none; FAA LID: L22

Summary
- Airport type: Public
- Owner/Operator: Yucca Valley Airport District
- Serves: Yucca Valley, California
- Elevation AMSL: 3,224 ft / 983 m
- Coordinates: 34°07′47″N 116°24′25″W
- Interactive map of Yucca Valley Airport

Runways
Direction	Length		Surface
Direction	ft	m	Surface
6/24	4,363	1,330	Asphalt

Statistics (2021)
- Aircraft operations (year ending 9/30/2021): 14,500
- Based aircraft: 34
- Source: Federal Aviation Administration

Yucca Valley Airport (FAA LID: L22) is a public use airport located three nautical miles (6 km) east of the central business district of Yucca Valley, a town in San Bernardino County, California, United States. It is owned by the Yucca Valley Airport District.

== Facilities and aircraft ==
Yucca Valley Airport covers an area of 35 acres (14 ha) at an elevation of 3,224 feet (983 m) above mean sea level. It has one runway designated 6/24 with an asphalt surface measuring 4,363 by 60 feet (1,330 x 18 m).

For the 12-month period ending September 30, 2021, the airport had 14,500 general aviation aircraft operations, an average of 40 per day. At that time there were 34 aircraft based at this airport: 31 single-engine, 2 multi-engine, and 1 glider.
