= Eloise Reyes =

American politician (born 1956)

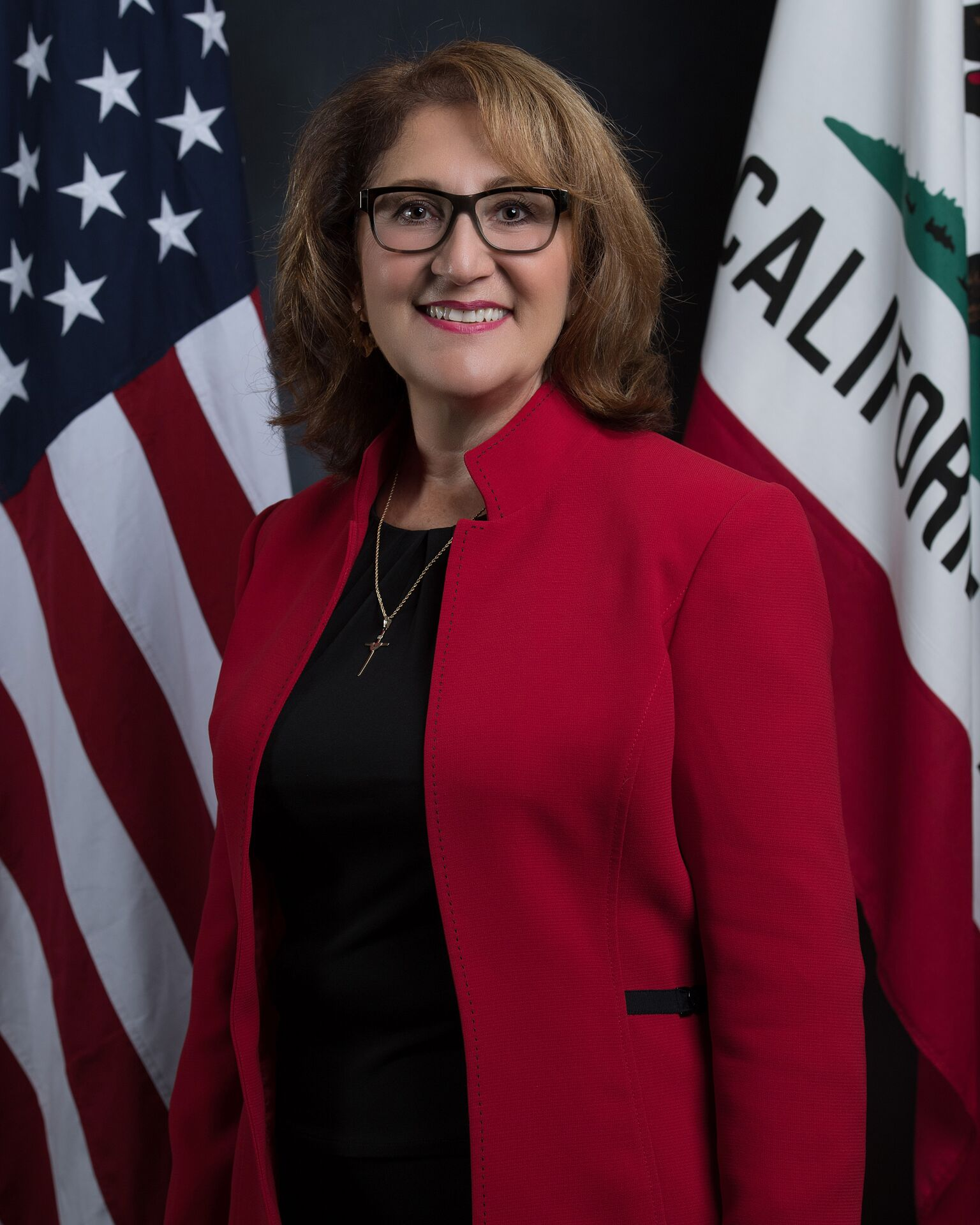

Member of the California Senate from the 29th district
- Incumbent
- Assumed office December 2, 2024
- Preceded by: Josh Newman (redistricted)

Majority Leader of the California Assembly
- In office December 4, 2020 – July 3, 2023
- Preceded by: Ian Calderon
- Succeeded by: Isaac Bryan

Member of the California Assembly
- In office December 5, 2016 – December 2, 2024
- Preceded by: Cheryl Brown
- Succeeded by: Robert Garcia
- Constituency: 47th district (2016-2022); 50th district (2022-2024)

Personal details
- Born: January 27, 1956 (age 70) Colton, California, U.S.
- Party: Democratic
- Spouse: Frank Reyes
- Children: 1
- Education: University of Southern California (BS); Loyola Marymount University (JD)

Eloise Gómez Reyes (born January 27, 1956) is an American politician who is a member of the California State Senate since 2024, representing the 29th district. A member of the Democratic Party, she formerly served as the Majority Leader of the California State Assembly and represented the 50th Assembly district, encompassing urban parts of southwestern San Bernardino County centered around Downtown San Bernardino, including the cities of Rialto, Colton, and Fontana. She was first elected to the 47th Assembly district by defeating fellow Democrat Cheryl Brown in 2016, who she said was not progressive enough.

Prior to her election to the assembly, she was an attorney. In 2014, Reyes ran unsuccessfully for the United States House of Representatives in the 31st Congressional District, coming in fourth place in the June primary.

Reyes is a member of the California Legislative Progressive Caucus.

== Electoral history ==
2014 California's 31st congressional district primary
Party	Candidate	Votes	%
Republican	Paul Chabot	14,163	26.6
Democratic	Pete Aguilar	9,242	17.4
Republican	Lesli Gooch	9,033	17.0
Democratic	Eloise Reyes	8,461	15.9
Democratic	Joe Baca	5,954	11.2
Democratic	Danny Tillman	4,659	8.7
Republican	Ryan Downing	1,737	3.3
Total votes		53,249	100.0

2016 California State Assembly 47th district election
Primary election
Party	Candidate	Votes	%
Democratic	Cheryl Brown (incumbent)	25,165	44.1
Democratic	Eloise Reyes	20,342	35.6
Republican	Aissa Chanel Sanchez	11,613	20.3
Total votes		57,120	100.0
General election
Democratic	Eloise Reyes	62,432	54.6
Democratic	Cheryl Brown (incumbent)	51,994	45.4
Total votes		114,426	100.0
Democratic hold			

2018 California State Assembly 47th district election
Primary election
Party	Candidate	Votes	%
Democratic	Eloise Reyes (incumbent)	30,629	100.0
Total votes		30,629	100.0
General election
Democratic	Eloise Reyes (incumbent)	77,458	100.0
Total votes		77,458	100.0
Democratic hold			

2020 California State Assembly 47th district election
Primary election
Party	Candidate	Votes	%
Democratic	Eloise Reyes (incumbent)	45,618	71.0
Republican	Matthew Gordon	18,649	29.0
Total votes		64,267	100.0
General election
Democratic	Eloise Reyes (incumbent)	109,635	69.0
Republican	Matthew Gordon	49,170	31.0
Total votes		158,805	100.0
Democratic hold			

2022 California State Assembly 50th district election
Primary election
Party	Candidate	Votes	%
Democratic	Eloise Reyes (incumbent)	26,540	57.0
Republican	Sheela Stark	18,428	39.6
Libertarian	Rodgir Cohen	1,577	3.4
Total votes		46,545	100.0
General election
Democratic	Eloise Reyes (incumbent)	51,340	56.9
Republican	Sheela Stark	38,851	43.1
Total votes		90,191	100.0
Democratic hold			

2024 California State Senate 29th district election
Primary election
Party	Candidate	Votes	%
Democratic	Eloise Reyes	44,977	45.0
Republican	Carlos A. Garcia	31,947	32.0
Republican	Kathleen Torres Hazelton	12,996	13.0
Democratic	Jason O'Brien	10,045	10.0
Total votes		99,965	100.0
General election
Democratic	Eloise Reyes	160,820	57.0
Republican	Carlos A. Garcia	121,085	43.0
Total votes		281,905	100.0
Democratic hold			

California Assembly
Preceded by Ian Calderon	Majority Leader of the California Assembly; 2020–2023	Succeeded by Isaac Bryan
