= Greg Wallis =

American politician

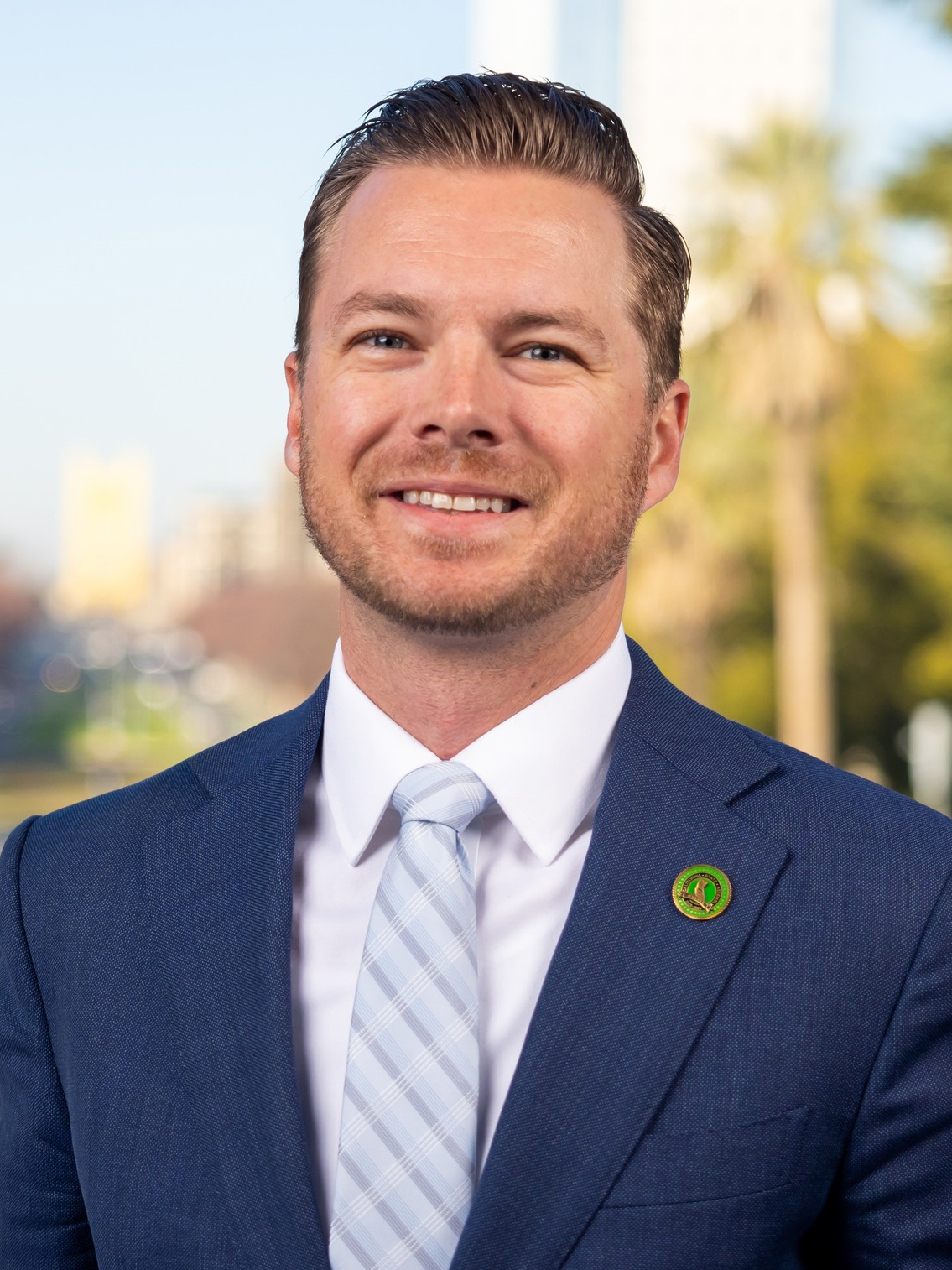
- Official portrait, 2023

Member of the California State Assembly from the 47th district
- Incumbent
- Assumed office December 7, 2022
- Preceded by: Chad Mayes (redistricted)

Personal details
- Born: Gregory Robert Wallis; May 15, 1990 (age 36) San Jose, California, U.S.
- Party: Republican
- Spouse: Desiree Wallis
- Education: California Lutheran University

Gregory Robert Wallis (born May 15, 1990) is an American politician from California serving as a member of the California State Assembly, representing the 47th district.

== Early life and education ==
Wallis was born on May 15, 1990. He studied political science at California Lutheran University and became a district director for assemblymember Chad Mayes in 2014. Prior to becoming a district director for Mayes, he worked as an account executive for Mann Communications and as an executive director of the Inland Empire Taxpayer’s Association.

== Political career ==
In February 2022, Wallis announced his candidacy for the newly-redrawn 47th district after Mayes declined to seek re-election. In the primary election, Wallis secured the second position behind Democratic Palm Springs City Councilwoman Christy Holstege, setting up a face-off between them in the general election. In the initial general election results, Holstege held a narrow lead over Wallis, with the two candidates continually exchanging leads with each successive count. By December 12, Holstege had been defeated by Wallis by a margin of 85 votes, choosing to concede the race to Wallis and declining to pursue a recount.

In April 2023, Holstege announced that she would be running against Wallis. In the primary election, Wallis placed first ahead of Holstege, setting up a rematch of the 2022 election. Wallis won the general election by 51% to 48%.

== Electoral history ==
2022 California State Assembly 47th district election
Primary election
Party	Candidate	Votes	%
Democratic	Christy Holstege	51,169	46.5
Republican	Greg Wallis	37,996	34.5
Republican	Gary Michaels	12,716	11.5
Democratic	Jamie Swain	8,200	7.4
Total votes		110,081	100.0
General election
Republican	Greg Wallis	84,752	50.03
Democratic	Christy Holstege	84,667	49.97
Total votes		169,419	100.0
Republican gain from Independent			

2024 California State Assembly 47th district election
Primary election
Party	Candidate	Votes	%
Republican	Greg Wallis (incumbent)	58,312	48.6
Democratic	Christy Holstege	55,677	46.4
Democratic	Jamie Swain	6,115	5.1
Total votes		120,104	100.0
General election
Republican	Greg Wallis (incumbent)	119,072	51.2
Democratic	Christy Holstege	113,538	48.8
Total votes		232,610	100.0
Republican hold			
