= Brian Goldsmith =

American politician

- Goldsmith in 2026

Member-elect of the California Senate from the 24th district
- Assuming office December 7, 2026
- Succeeding: Ben Allen

Personal details
- Party: Democratic
- Spouse: Claire Pasternack (m. 2010)
- Children: 2
- Parent(s): Karen Mack; Russell Goldsmith
- Relatives: Bram Goldsmith (grandfather); Jerome D. Mack (grandfather); Benjamin N. Maltz (great-grandfather); Nate Mack (great-grandfather)
- Education: Harvard University (BA); Stanford Law School (JD)
- Website: Campaign website

Brian Mack Goldsmith is an American politician and journalist who is a member-elect of the California State Senate, representing the 24th district. He was elected to the California State Senate in the general election on November 3, 2026.

Goldsmith ran for office for the first time in 2026, focusing his campaign on affordability, government accountability, and public safety. He defeated West Hollywood City Councilman John M. Erickson to win the state Senate seat and replace the term-limited Ben Allen.

== Early life and education ==
Goldsmith is the son of Russell Goldsmith, chairman and former chief executive officer of the City National Bank, and Karen Mack, an author and CBS producer. He grew up in the West Los Angeles region. He graduated from the John Thomas Dye School in 1994 followed by Harvard-Westlake School, then deferred enrollment at Harvard University to work on Hillary Clinton's first U.S. Senate campaign and interned at CNN. He then earned his bachelor's degree from Harvard followed by Juris Doctor from Stanford Law School. Goldsmith has worked as a journalist, a lawyer, and a tech entrepeneur.

== Personal life ==
Goldsmith married Claire Pasternack in August 2010.
