= Cosgriff =

Cosgriff is a surname. Notable people with the name include:

- Jeff Cosgriff (born 1987), American soccer player
- Joe Cosgriff (1913–2008), Australian rules football player
- Richard H. Cosgriff (1845–1910), Irish-born American businessman, Civil War veteran
- Walter E. Cosgriff (1914–1961), American banker
