= Alfred Hart =

Alfred Hart may refer to:

- Alfred A. Hart (1816–1908), American photographer for the Central Pacific Railroad
- Alfred S. Hart (1904–1979), Hungarian-born American businessman and banker
