= Jerome D. Mack =

American banker, real estate investor, political fundraiser and philanthropist

- Born: November 6, 1920; Albion, Michigan, US
- Died: September 26, 1998 (aged 77); Los Angeles, California, US
- Education: Las Vegas High School; University of California, Los Angeles
- Occupations: Banker, real estate investor, political fundraiser, philanthropist
- Political party: Democratic Party
- Spouse: Joyce Rosenberg
- Children: 3, including Karen Mack Goldsmith
- Parent(s): Nate Mack; Jenny Solomon
- Relatives: Norman Levine (son-in-law); Russell Goldsmith (son-in-law)

Jerome D. Mack (November 6, 1920 – September 26, 1998) was an American banker, real estate investor, political fundraiser and philanthropist in Las Vegas, Nevada. He was the founder and president of the Bank of Las Vegas and, later, the Valley Bank. He was the president of the Riviera casino as well as director of the Four Queens and Dunes casinos. He was a major fundraiser for the Nevada Democratic Party and active in Jewish philanthropy both in Las Vegas and Israel. He was one of the founders of the University of Nevada, Las Vegas (UNLV).

== Early life ==
Jerome D. Mack was born on November 6, 1920, in Albion, Michigan. His father, Nate Mack, was a haberdasher and later a banker. His mother was Jenny Solomon. He moved to Las Vegas with his parents in 1929, when he was nine years old.

Mack attended Boulder City Grammar School and graduated from the Las Vegas High School in 1938. He then graduated from the University of California, Los Angeles (UCLA), where he was a member of the Zeta Beta Tau fraternity. He served as a navigator in the Army Air Corps during World War II.

== Career ==
Mack started his career at the Bank of Las Vegas in 1954, working alongside his father. Indeed, in January 1954, his father had co-founded the bank with Walter E. Cosgriff, Bob Kaltenborn, Jake Von Tobel, Bruce Beckley, and Herb Jones, the brother of Cliff Jones. It was the first bank to lend money to casinos in Las Vegas. Its first loan was to Milton Prell, who used it to build the Sahara Casino. Fifteen years later, in 1969, the bank merged with the Valley Bank of Reno, a bank established by E. Parry Thomas, originally based in Reno. By then, Mack had replaced his father at the helm of the bank and it had changed its name to the Valley Bank of Nevada. Their bank was acquired by Bank of America for about US$380.5 million in 1992.

Mack served as vice president of the Continental Connector Corporation, vice chairman of the United Tanker Group, and president of First Bancorporation (later known as the Nevada National Bank, which went on to merge with Wells Fargo). He also served on the board of directors of the Pioneer Title and Insurance Corporation. He served on the board of directors of the Las Vegas Chamber of Commerce for two terms.

Mack was the president of the Riviera Casino as well as director of the Four Queens and Dunes hotel-casinos. He started developing the McCarran Center in 1991. Located south of the McCarran International Airport and spanning 100 acres (40 ha) of land, it includes offices, a hotel and several restaurants.

== Politics ==
Mack served as finance chair of the Nevada Democratic Party in the 1960s. He then served on the Democratic National Finance Council and the Democratic Party National Committee. From 1958 to 1980, he was state coordinator and treasurer for Howard Cannon, a Democratic member of the United States Senate. In 1964, he served as the Nevada finance chairman for Lyndon Johnson's bid for president. Four years later, in 1968, he was state coordinator for Hubert Humphrey's presidential campaign.

Mack was appointed to the Nevada Tax Commission by Governor Mike O'Callaghan in 1972. By 1975, he became its chairman. Later in the 1970s, President Jimmy Carter appointed him as a member of the nominating commission for U.S. Circuit Judges for the 9th Circuit Court.

With E. Parry Thomas, Mack lobbied state legislator Bill Harrah as well as former governors Grant Sawyer and Paul Laxalt to pass a law legalizing the corporate ownership of casinos. According to Mack's daughter Karen, this put an end to corruption in Las Vegas, as it enforced more regulations and disclosures for the U.S. Securities and Exchange Commission.

== Philanthropy ==
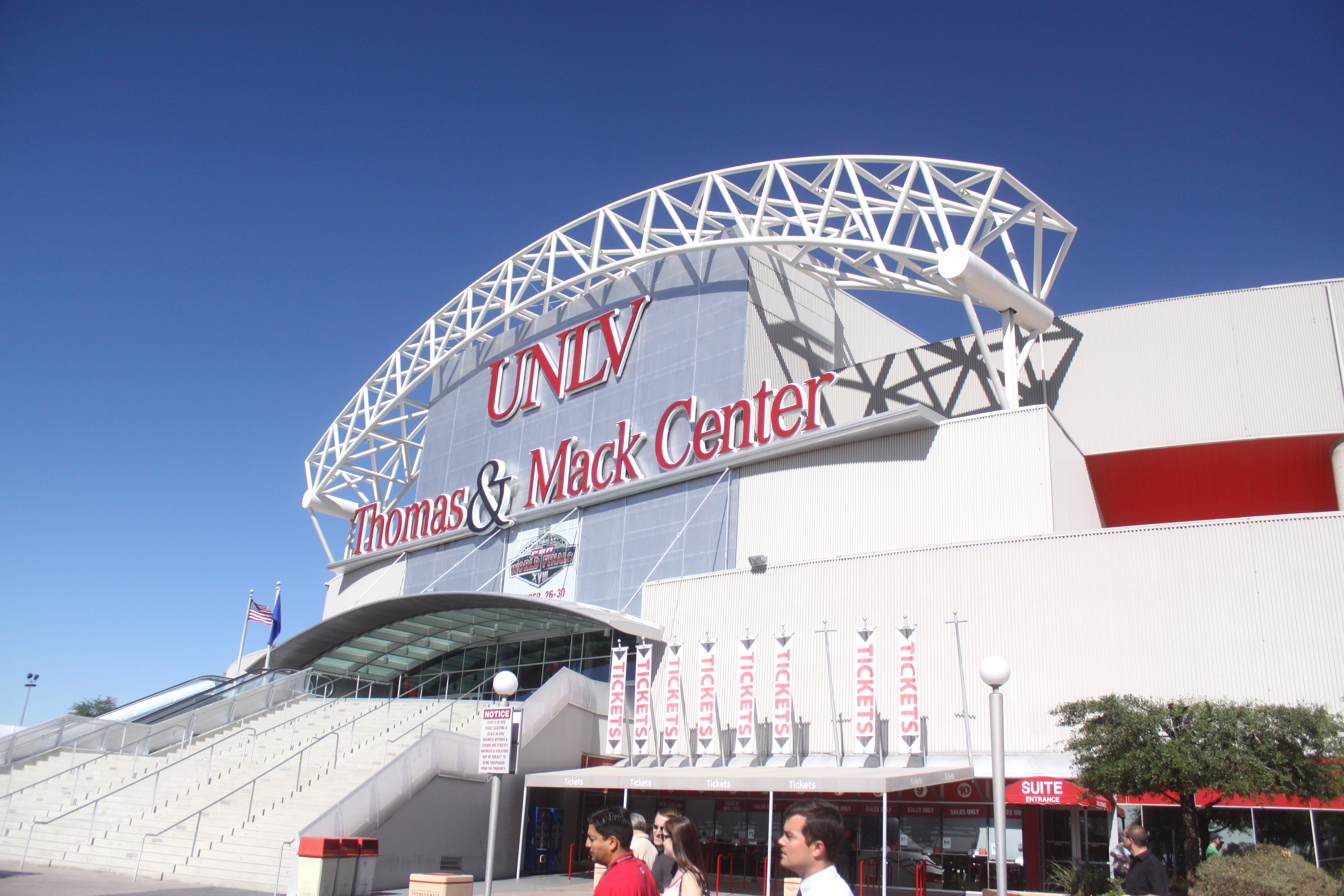
Thomas & Mack Center

In the 1950s, Mack co-founded the Nevada Southern College with Maude Frazier and Archie Grant. It later became known as the University of Nevada, Las Vegas. He also served on a committee to select the first board of trustees of UNLV. In 1967, with his business partner, E. Parry Thomas, he donated 400 additional acres of land to expand the campus. The two men also funded the construction of the basketball stadium at UNLV, which was named the Thomas & Mack Center in their honor. Later, the Thomas & Mack Legal Clinic at the William S. Boyd School of Law as well as the Thomas & Mack Moot Court Building were also named after them. Mack chaired a fundraising effort for the construction of the Artemus Ham Hall on the UNLV campus. He was inducted into the Business Hall of Fame of the Lee Business School at UNLV. He also received an honorary doctorate from UNLV in 1983. Additionally, he served on a committee to establish the first board of trustees at his alma mater, UCLA. He was also a founding member of the UCLA Chancellors Association.

Mack served on the Boulder Dam Council of the Boy Scouts of America. Additionally, he was the founder and director of the Boys Club of Nevada and served as chairman for advance gifts of the United Way. He was the 1972 recipient of the United Way Leadership Award as well as the National Conference of Christians and Jews Silver Medallion Award.

Mack served as president of Temple Beth Sholom, a synagogue in Las Vegas. Later, he established the Nate Mack Elementary School at the temple, in honor of his father. He was also president of B'nai B'rith. He served on the board of trustees of the American Jewish Committee and the national committee of the United Jewish Appeal. He funded the chair in cancer research at the Hebrew University of Jerusalem. From 1959 to 1976, he served as chairman of the Israel Bonds Campaigns, a fundraising effort to develop the state of Israel. He was also the chairman of the United Jewish Appeal. In 1973, he was a recipient of the Prime Minister's Medal of Israel. That same year, he also received the Silver Anniversary Award from the State of Israel. Mack was one of the founders of the Jewish Federation of Las Vegas.

== Personal life ==
Mack married Joyce Rosenberg in 1946. They had met at UCLA. They had three daughters:

- Barbara Mack Feller Levine. She married Norman Levine.
- Karen Mack. She married Russell Goldsmith, the chairman and chief executive officer of City National Bank.
- Marilynn Mack.

== Death ==
Mack died of cancer on September 26, 1998, in Los Angeles, California. His funeral took place at Temple Emanuel in Beverly Hills, California.

A middle school bearing his name opened in 2006 in Las Vegas.
