= Peter M. Thomas =

American attorney, businessman and banker

- Education: University of Utah; Georgetown University School of Law (JD)
- Occupations: Attorney, businessman, banker
- Parent(s): E. Parry Thomas; Peggy Thomas
- Relatives: 4 siblings, including Roger Thomas (designer)

Peter M. Thomas is an American attorney, businessman and banker from Las Vegas, Nevada and Los Angeles, California.

== Early life ==
Peter M. Thomas grew up in Las Vegas and Sun Valley, Idaho. His father, E. Parry Thomas, was a banker. His mother, Peggy Thomas, is a dressage rider. He graduated from the University of Utah in 1972. He received a J.D. from the Georgetown University Law Center in 1975. He passed the bar test in Utah, Nevada, and the District of Columbia.

== Career ==
Thomas was the president and chief operating officer of Valley Bank of Nevada from 1982 to 1992. After it was acquired by Bank of America, he served as president and chief operating officer of the Nevada section of Bank of America from 1992 to 1995. He also was the senior vice president of global sales at SPL WorldGroup. He was on the board of directors of the Los Angeles Branch of the Federal Reserve Bank of San Francisco from January 2003 to December 2008.

Thomas was on the board of directors of the Rio Suite Hotel and Casino from 1995 to 1999. He was chairman of the Las Vegas Metropolitan Police Department's Committee on Fiscal Affairs from 1994 through 2006. He also served on the boards of the Las Vegas Convention and Visitors Authority, Nevada Commission on Economic Development, and Nevada Development Authority. He has also served on the Nevada Nuclear Projects Commission.

Thomas has been a managing partner at Thomas & Mack Company since 1995. Additionally, he has been on the board of directors of Coast Casinos since 2002, the City National Bank since 2003, and the Boyd Gaming Corporation since 2004.

Thomas is on the board of trustees of the University of Nevada, Las Vegas Foundation.
