= Karen Mack =

American novelist

- Born: Karen Diane Mack; January 4, 1950 (age 76); Los Angeles County, California, U.S.
- Education: University of California, Los Angeles (BA, JD)
- Occupations: Attorney; television producer; novelist
- Spouse: Russell Goldsmith
- Children: Brian Goldsmith
- Parent(s): Jerome D. Mack; Joyce Rosenberg
- Relatives: Nate Mack (paternal grandfather); Bram Goldsmith (father-in-law)

Karen Diane Mack (born January 4, 1950) is an American television producer for CBS and co-author of three novels, from Los Angeles, California.

== Early life ==
Karen Mack grew up in Las Vegas, Nevada. Her father, Jerome D. Mack, was a banker and real estate investor. When she was nine years old, he named Karen Avenue in Las Vegas after her. Her mother, née Joyce Rosenberg, was a philanthropist. Her paternal grandfather was the co-founder of the Bank of Las Vegas. She was raised in a Jewish household, with her father serving as president of Temple Beth Sholom.

Mack graduated cum laude graduate from the University of California, Los Angeles (UCLA), where she received a Bachelor of Arts degree in political science. She then received a Juris Doctor from the UCLA School of Law.

== Career ==
Mack started her career as an entertainment attorney for Lorimar Television and Republic Studios. Later, she started producing television programs and movies. She is the executive producer of A Home for the Holidays on CBS. In 2008, the program won the Television Academy Honors from the Academy of Television Arts and Sciences.

Mack is also the co-author of three novels with Jennifer Kaufman. The first novel, published in 2006, was Number 1 on the New York Times Bestseller List. It talks about a bored young woman in West Los Angeles, who spends her time reading fiction to escape reality. The second novel, published in 2007, is about a thirty-year-old widow from Topanga Canyon who never finished high school and lies on her resume to get a job. The third novel, published in 2014, is about Sigmund Freud's sister-in-law, Minna Bernays, who moves in with her sister and Freud after she loses her job; soon, she becomes Freud's mistress.

Mack has been a contributor to The Los Angeles Times Magazine.

== Political activity ==
Mack hosted a fundraiser for Hillary Clinton's 2016 presidential campaign.

== Personal life ==
Mack is married to Russell Goldsmith, the chairman and chief executive officer of City National Bank. They reside in Los Angeles, California. They have a son, Brian Goldsmith, who worked as a producer on the CBS Evening News and as an assistant to Katie Couric.

== Bibliography ==
- Literacy and Longing in LA (2006).
- A Version of the Truth (2007).
- Freud's Mistress (2014).
