= E. Parry Thomas =

American banker known for Las Vegas involvement

- Born: June 9, 1921; Ogden, Utah, U.S.
- Died: August 26, 2016 (aged 95); Hailey, Idaho, U.S.
- Occupation: Banker
- Spouse: Peggy Thomas
- Children: 5, including Peter M. Thomas and Roger Thomas (designer)

Edward Parry Thomas (June 29, 1921 – August 26, 2016) was an American banker who helped finance the development of the casino industry of Las Vegas, Nevada. Along with his business partner, Jerome D. Mack, he is credited with building Las Vegas into what it is today.

== Early life ==
Thomas was born on June 29, 1921, in Ogden, Utah. He was raised in the Church of Jesus Christ of Latter-day Saints (LDS Church). His father was a plumbing contractor who later became a banker. During World War II, he served in the United States Army as an intelligence operative.

== Banking career ==
Thomas started his career at the Continental Bank & Trust Co. of Salt Lake City. It was owned by Walter E. Cosgriff, who also owned a stake in the Bank of Las Vegas, whose chairman was Nate Mack. The Bank of Las Vegas was the first bank to lend money to casinos in Las Vegas. Its first loan was to Milton Prell, who used it to build the Sahara casino.

Later, Jerome D. Mack replaced his father as chairman. Meanwhile, in 1961, shortly after Cosgriff's death, Thomas became its President. He facilitated loans from the Teamsters Central States Pension Fund to Las Vegas casinos. In 1968 the bank merged with Valley Bank of Reno and changed its name to the Valley Bank of Nevada. Thomas and Mack also invested in real estate in the Las Vegas area, with Thomas acting as a buyer for Howard Hughes. Later, they also lent money to Steve Wynn. The bank was eventually acquired by Bank of America for about $380.5 million in 1992.

== Politics ==
Thomas was a Republican. With Jerry Mack, Thomas lobbied influential Nevada businessman Bill Harrah as well as former Governors Grant Sawyer and Paul Laxalt to pass two acts legalizing the corporate ownership of casinos. They were known as the Corporate Gaming Acts in 1967 and 1969. According to Mack's daughter Karen, these laws aimed to put an end to corruption in Las Vegas, as it enforced more regulations and disclosures for the U.S. Securities and Exchange Commission.

== Philanthropy ==
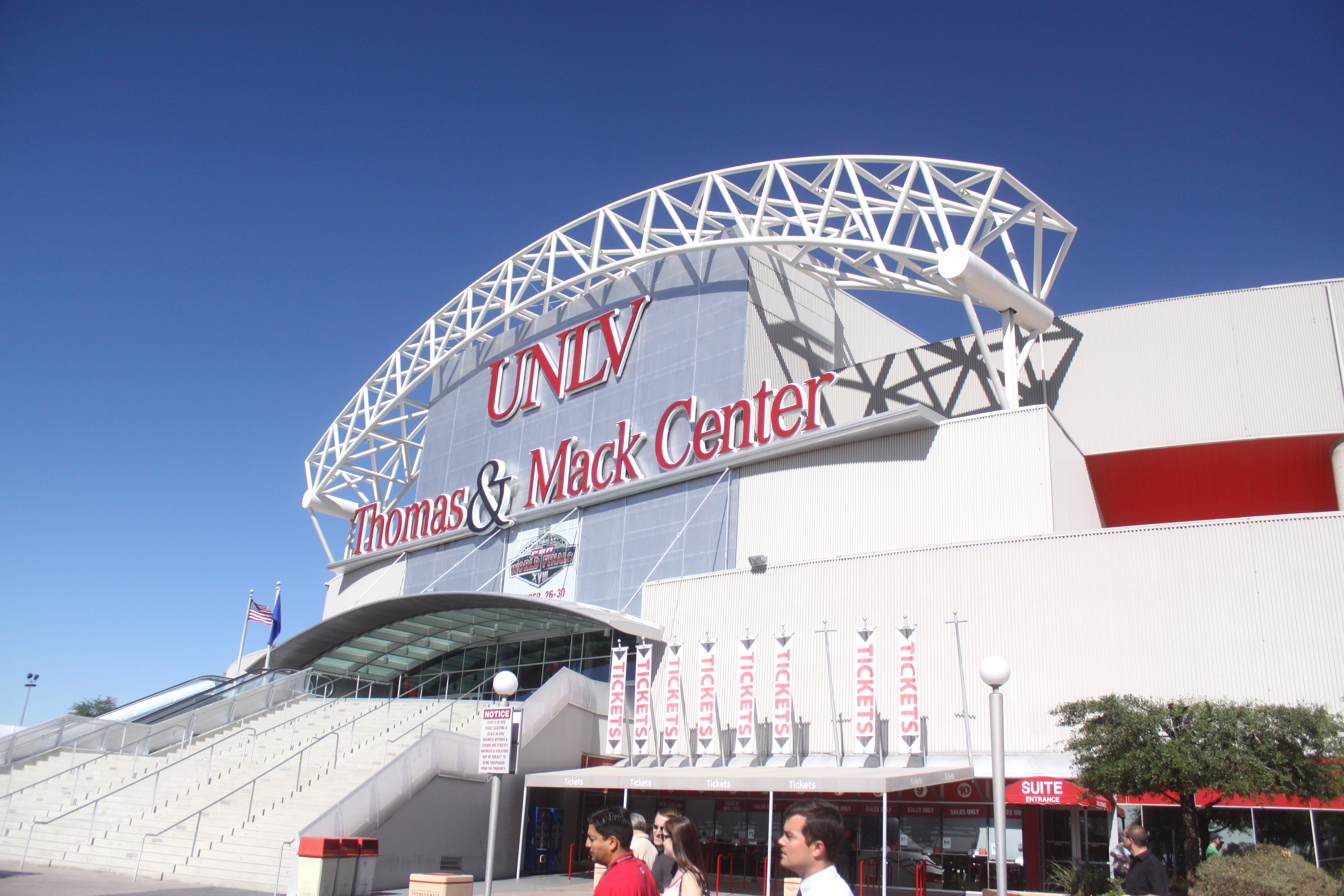
Thomas & Mack Center

With Jerry Mack, Thomas donated 400 additional acres of land to expand the campus of the University of Nevada, Las Vegas (UNLV). The two men also funded the construction of the basketball stadium at UNLV, which was named the Thomas & Mack Center in their honor. Later, the Thomas & Mack Legal Clinic at the William S. Boyd School of Law as well as the Thomas & Mack Moot Court Building were also named after them. Thomas received an honorary doctorate from UNLV in 1982.

== Dressage ==
With his wife, Thomas sponsored dressage; both his wife and daughter Jane were riders. Dressage trainer and competitor Debbie McDonald taught his daughter. He and his wife owned Brentina, a prize-winning, Olympic bronze medalist dressage horse. They also have sponsored Adrienne Lyle, a dressage competitor.

== Personal life ==
Thomas was married to Peggy. They had four sons and one daughter. They summered at their dressage farm called River Grove Farm in Hailey, near Sun Valley, Idaho, and wintered in Las Vegas and Del Mar, California.

Two of his sons, Peter and Tom, manage Thomas & Mack, the family real estate development firm in Las Vegas. Another son, Roger Thomas is an interior designer; he has designed many casinos for Steve Wynn, both in the United States and in China. His son Dr. Steven Thomas is an orthopedic surgeon in Las Vegas and graduated from Johns Hopkins. One of his grandsons, David Peter Thomas, died of an undisclosed cause in Blaine County, Idaho, in 2003, at the age of 28.

E. Parry Thomas died on August 26, 2016, at his ranch in Hailey, Idaho, at the age of 95.

In 1996, Thomas received the Golden Plate Award of the American Academy of Achievement presented by Awards Council member Steve Wynn at a ceremony in Sun Valley, Idaho.
