= Russell Goldsmith =

American lawyer

- Education: Harvard University (BA, JD)
- Occupations: Attorney; Businessman; Banker
- Employer: City National Bank
- Spouse: Karen Mack
- Children: 3, including Brian
- Parent(s): Bram Goldsmith; Elaine (Maltz) Goldsmith
- Relatives: Benjamin N. Maltz (maternal grandfather); Jerome D. Mack (father-in-law)

Russell Goldsmith is an American attorney, businessman and banker. He was the chairman and former chief executive officer of the City National Bank, until he retired in January 2022.

== Early life ==
Goldsmith graduated from Beverly Hills High School in 1967. Goldsmith later graduated from Harvard University and received a J.D. from the Harvard Law School. His father, Bram Goldsmith, was chairman emeritus of City National Bank and his mother, Elaine (Maltz) Goldsmith, is a philanthropist. His maternal grandfather, Benjamin N. Maltz (1901–1993), was a co-founder of City National Bank in 1954.

== Career ==
Goldsmith started his career as an attorney at Irell & Manella. Later, he co-founded his own law firm, Sanders, Barnet & Goldsmith, which tackled entertainment litigations.

From 1983 to 1985, Goldsmith was the chief operating officer of Lorimar Television, a film production company. From 1986 to 1994, he was chairman and CEO of Republic Pictures, a formerly publicly traded company. Moreover, from 1990 to 1994, he was vice chairman of the San Diego Padres, a baseball sports team.

Goldsmith has been on the board of directors of City National Bank since 1978. He has been the chairman and CEO of City National Bank since October 1995. From 2008 to 2011, he wason the Federal Advisory Council of the Federal Reserve Bank of San Francisco; during that period of time, he also was its vice president for two years. He is also chair of the Mid-Size Bank Coalition of America.

Goldsmith is on the board of trustees of the Harvard-Westlake School in Los Angeles, the Bay Area Council and the Jewish Federation Council of Greater Los Angeles as well as on the board of governors of the Frederick S. Pardee RAND Graduate School. Additionally, he is a member of the Council on Foreign Relations, the California Commission for Jobs and Economic Growth and the Civic Alliance. He also is on the board of directors of Wynn Las Vegas and the Financial Services Roundtable.

== Political activity ==
Goldsmith hosted a fundraiser for Hillary Clinton's 2016 presidential campaign.

== Personal life ==
Goldsmith is married to Karen Mack, a producer and writer and the daughter of Las Vegas real estate developer Jerome D. Mack (1920–1998). They have three children, including Brian.
