= Roger Thomas (designer) =

American interior designer

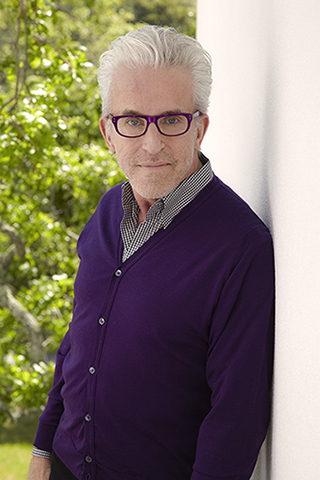
- Born: November 4, 1951 (age 74); Salt Lake City, UT
- Education: School of the Museum of Fine Arts, Boston
- Occupation: Interior Designer
- Years active: 1974–present
- Spouse: Arthur Libera (m. 2005)
- Children: 1
- Parent(s): E. Parry Thomas, Peggy Thomas
- Relatives: 4 siblings, including Peter M. Thomas
- Website: https://therogerthomascollection.com/

Roger Thomas (born November 4, 1951) is an American interior designer best known for his work on resort hotels and casinos in Las Vegas, including the Bellagio, Wynn Las Vegas, and Encore Las Vegas His work also extends elsewhere, including Wynn Macau and Encore Macau in China. He was the Executive Vice President of Design for Wynn Design & Development, before retiring in 2020, and principal of the Roger Thomas Collection. Thomas has been named five times to the Architectural Digest AD100 list of the world's preeminent architects and designers, and was inducted into the Interior Design Magazine Hall of Fame in 2015. He is also a member of Hospitality Design's Platinum Circle, inducted in 2005.

== Early life ==
Thomas was born in Salt Lake City, Utah, and raised in Las Vegas, Nevada. In the 1950s, his father, E. Parry Thomas, was CEO of the Bank of Las Vegas, the only bank willing to loan money to area casinos.

After spending his final two years of high school at the Interlochen Arts Academy in Interlochen, Michigan, Thomas earned a BFA in art history from the School of the Museum of Fine Arts, Boston, in partnership with Tufts University, where he was trained in painting, sculpture, textiles, metalsmithing, and ceramics, with a major in art history. He also received an honorary master's degree from the Interior Design Institute.

== Career ==
=== Interior Designer ===
In 1974, Thomas began designing interiors for banks and other financial institutions. He spent seven years running the Las Vegas office of design house Yates Silverman, designed penthouses for the Stardust Resort and Casino, and designed his first casino, the Lady Luck (now the Downtown Grand), in a Saturday Night Fever motif. Thomas felt the standard design of the city's casinos had a disorienting, claustrophobic layout lacking décor, and that their designs relied too heavily on fantasy.

In 1980, Steve Wynn, a family friend, asked Thomas to design the guest rooms, as well as the Spa Suite Tower and Carson Tower, at the Golden Nugget Las Vegas. Their next major collaboration was the first major ground-up resort in Las Vegas in 25 years, a hotel and casino more sophisticated than others in the city. This would become The Mirage resort and hotel, which opened in 1989. It was the Las Vegas’ first megaresort, having 3,044 rooms. Thomas's work designing the interiors of the tropical-themed Mirage and swashbuckler-themed Treasure Island, which opened in 1993, played a key role in reshaping Las Vegas properties.

Beginning with the interior design for The Bellagio, which opened in 1998, Wynn and Thomas "reinvented the look of the modern gambling hall by deliberately violating every previously accepted rule of casino design," helping Wynn's hotels achieve an original, more luxurious approach. The Bellagio immediately became the standard against which subsequent strip resorts were measured, with a heavy focus on luxury and art. It was designed to put gamblers at ease, with high ceilings, European-style furnishings and a wide-open, axial, easy-to-navigate layout. The Bellagio would generate the largest profits for a single Las Vegas property in the city's history. At a cost of $1.6 billion, it was the most expensive hotel in the world at the time.

Following the sale of Mirage Resorts to MGM Resorts in 2000, Thomas led design for the newly formed Wynn Resorts, beginning with the Wynn Las Vegas, which opened in 2005. The resort casino design included changing from a low-ceiling, dimly-lit feel to bring in natural light, adding a garden atrium and pioneering the placement of chandeliers above gambling tables. Thomas has also designed interiors for the Wynn Macau in China, which opened in 2006, the $2.3 billion, 2,000-room Encore at Wynn Las Vegas in 2009, and the Encore at Wynn Macau in 2010. He oversaw design of the Wynn Palace, also in Macau, a $4.2 billion resort which opened in August 2016. His final project for Wynn was designing the interiors for Encore Boston Harbor, which opened in June 2019. Thomas retired from Wynn in 2020, and was succeeded by Todd-Avery Lenahan.

Thomas's opulent style is heavily influenced by 16th-century Italian architect Andrea Palladio, 18th-century French architecture and interiors, and 20th-century French, Austrian and US modernists. Jonah Lehrer said that "doing the opposite of what is usual has become Thomas's trademark," while Interior Design Magazine states how "His hotels embody a two-pronged approach. They are dazzling to look at, as befits the capital city of illusion and abandon, but they work on a personal level."

=== Home Furnishings and Other Designs ===
In 2006, Thomas founded The Roger Thomas Collection, as a design consultancy for luxury furnishings, mirrors, carpets, fabric, wall coverings, lighting and other decorative accessories. Thomas has created signature collections and pieces for brands including Quintus, Global Views, Eric Brand, Townsend Leather, Speakman, Fromental, Maya Romanoff, S. Harris, Samuel & Sons, Sicis Jewels, Boyd Lighting, Koroseal and OW Hospitality. He received three Interior Design Best of Year Awards nominations through the Roger Thomas Collection, and won in 2019 for his work on the Scorpio sconce for Boyd Lighting. He designed the private homes of Steve Wynn, including his Manhattan duplex, where he focused on enhancements such as a lighting scheme that would suit Wynn's art collection, and custom-made furnishings.

=== Board Memberships ===
Thomas serves on the Italian board of Venetian Heritage, and is a founding board member of the upcoming Las Vegas Museum of Art, which is currently planned to begin construction by 2027. He was a founding board member of the Smith Center for the Performing Arts in Las Vegas, and formerly chaired the Collections Committee at The Neon Museum. Thomas also formerly served on the board of the Nevada Institute for Contemporary Art, Nevada Ballet Theatre, Wheelwright Museum, the McCarran Airport Arts Advisory Committee, the Clark County Government Center Architect Selection Committee, and the Clark County Federal Courthouse Architect Selection Committee.

=== Book ===
In 2024, Roger Thomas wrote his first book, Resort Style: Spaces of Celebration. Published by Rizzoli, the book has a collection of essays discussing “Evocatecture”, and the emotional themes and layouts of his resort designs. He participated in a book tour throughout 2024 into 2025, which included appearances in Las Vegas, Paris, Milan, New York City, Los Angeles, and San Francisco

== Personal life ==
Thomas is a lifelong resident of Las Vegas, Nevada, and currently maintains homes in Venice, Italy and Marin County, California. He was raised as a Mormon. He has been married twice to women, and from one of those marriages, has a daughter, Drew Thomas. He came out as gay at the age of 45, and has said that coming out improved his work by allowing him to be more authentic. He is married to Arthur Libera, a licensing agent for artists and designers.

== Honors and awards ==
Year	Outlet	Nominee	Category	Notes
2005	Hospitality Design	Roger Thomas	Platinum Circle Inductee	
2005	Network of Executive Women in Hospitality (NEWH)	Roger Thomas	Lifetime Achievement Award	
2007	Architectural Digest	Roger Thomas	AD100: Top 100 Architecture & Interior Design	
2008	International Hotel/Motel & Restaurant Show	Roger Thomas	Designer of the Year	
2009	World Market Center Las Vegas	Roger Thomas	Design Icon Award	
2009	Global Gaming Expo (G2E)	Roger Thomas	Sarno Lifetime Achievement Award	
2010	Architectural Digest	Roger Thomas	AD100: Top 100 Architecture & Interior Design	
2011	University of Nevada, Las Vegas	Roger Thomas	Hall of Fame	
2012	Architectural Digest	The Roger Thomas Collection	AD100: Top 100 Architecture & Interior Design	
2012	Academy of Art University	Roger Thomas	Art Design Icon of the Year	
2014	Architectural Digest	The Roger Thomas Collection	AD100: Top 100 Architecture & Interior Design	
2015	Interior Design	Roger Thomas	Hall of Fame Inductee	
2017	Architectural Digest	The Roger Thomas Collection	AD100: Top 100 Architecture & Interior Design	
2019	Boston Design Week	Roger Thomas	Lifetime Achievement Award	
2019	Interior Design	Scorpio for Boyd Lighting	Best of Year Awards, Sconce	
2019	Interior Design	Roger Thomas Collection for Rocky Mountain Hardware	Best of Year Awards, Hardware	Honoree
2022	Interior Design	Roger Thomas Collection for Koroseal	Best of Year Awards, Contract Wallcovering	Honoree

== Bibliography ==
Year	Book Title	Publisher	ISBN
2024	Resort Style: Spaces of Celebration	New York: Rizzoli	978-0-8478-9995-1
