= Wynn Palace =

Luxury hotel and casino in Macau

- 永利皇宮 (Yue Chinese); Palácio Wynn (Portuguese)

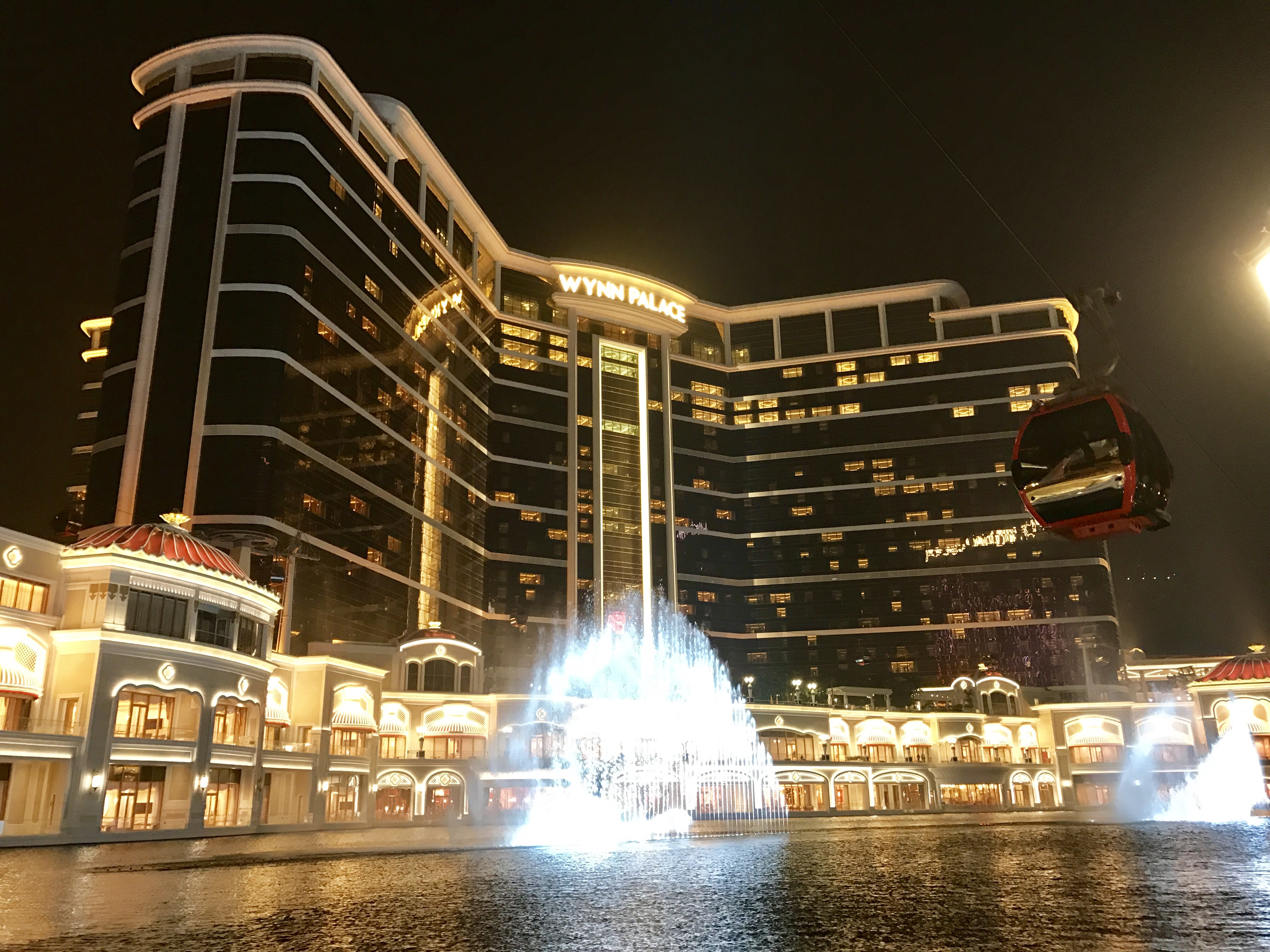
- Interactive map of Wynn Palace
- Location: Cotai, Macau, Special administrative regions of China; 22.1472°N 113.5681°E
- Opened: 22 August 2016; 10 years ago
- Theme: Floral
- No. of rooms: 1,706
- Gaming space: 39,000 square metres (420,000 sq ft)
- Signature attractions: 8-acre performance lake, SkyCab gondolas, retail, dining, entertainment, convention venues
- Notable restaurants: Wing Lei Palace, SW Steakhouse, Mizumi, Sichuan Moon, Buffet Fontana
- Casino type: Land-based
- Owner: Wynn Resorts Limited, Wynn Macau limited
- Architect: Wynn Design & Development; Leo A Daly
- Website: www.wynnresortsmacau.com/en/wynn-palace

Wynn Palace
- Chinese: 永利皇宮
Transcriptions
Standard Mandarin
- Hanyu Pinyin: Yǒnglì Huánggōng
Yue: Cantonese
- Jyutping: wing5 lei6 wong4 gung1

Portuguese name
- Portuguese: Palácio Wynn

Wynn Palace (Chinese: 永利皇宮, Portuguese: Palácio Wynn) is the second luxury integrated resort from international resort developer Wynn Resorts in the Macau Special Administrative Region of the People's Republic of China, following the launch of Wynn Macau. Located in Cotai, it features a 28-story luxury hotel with 1,706 rooms, suites and villas, meeting facilities, over 9,800 square metres (106,000 sq ft) of luxury retail, 13 casual and fine dining restaurants, Macau's largest spa, a salon, a pool and approximately 39,400 square metres (424,000 sq ft) of casino space. The resort also features a variety of entertainment experiences, including the 3.2-hectare (8-acre) Performance Lake with a choreographed display of water, music and light, the unique SkyCab, spectacular, large-scale floral displays by designer Preston Bailey and an extensive collection of art works by some of the world's leading artists.

Wynn Resorts is the recipient of more Forbes Travel Guide Five Star Awards than any other independent hotel company in the world. Wynn Palace is the first and only resort in the world with more than one thousand rooms to receive Forbes Travel Guide Five Star Awards. As of 2020, Wynn Palace now has more Forbes Five-Star restaurants than any other individual resort in the world, including Sichuan Moon which holds the distinction as "Restaurant of the Year." Wynn Palace opened on August 22, 2016.

== History ==
=== Proposal and design stage (2008-2011) ===
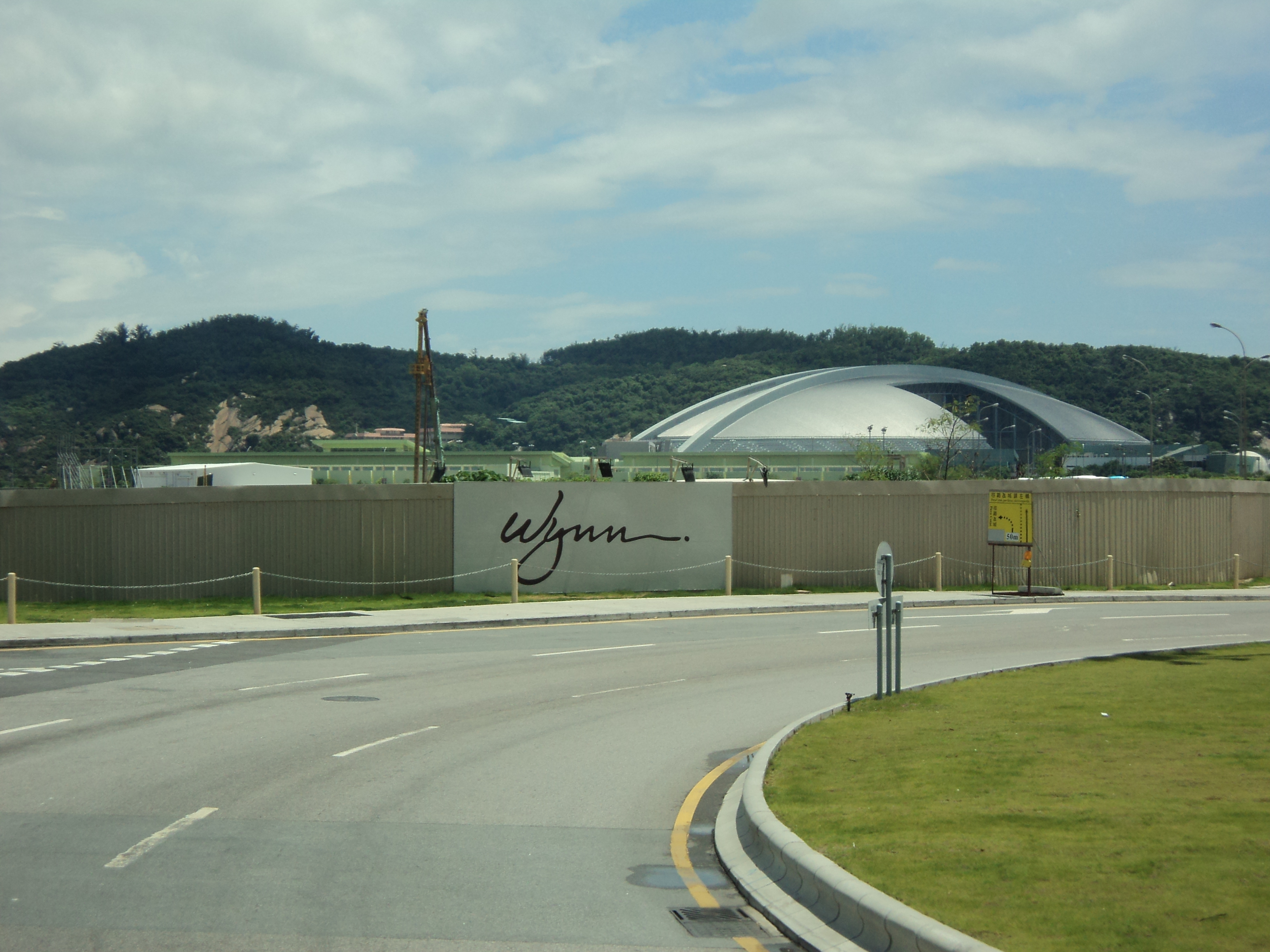
Wynn Macau Ltd's land reserve in Cotai in 2011, showing the plot before the start of construction on the Wynn Palace.

In 2006, the hotel and casino Wynn Macau was launched in the city of Macau by Wynn Resorts, a Las Vegas-based hospitality and development company. Wynn Macau, Ltd became a subsidiary of Wynn Resorts, with Wynn Resorts owning 72.2% of Wynn Macau, Ltd. Following the opening of Wynn Macau, Wynn Enterprises expressed interest in opening a second resort nearby and began looking into land in Cotai, which is similar to the Vegas Strip in its focus on luxury casino-hotels and entertainment.

In 2008, Wynn Resorts paid US$50 million to Tien Chiao Entertainment and Investment Company Limited "in exchange for the company relinquishing its rights to what is now Wynn's Cotai site," a 52-acre (210,000 m^{2}) plot in close proximity to casinos such as City of Dreams, Las Vegas Sands, St. Regis Macao and Sheraton Resorts. Steve Wynn, the chairman and chief executive officer (CEO) of Wynn Resorts, announced in mid-August 2010 that he would be building a new casino-resort on the plot, and that the Cotai project could break ground in March or April 2011, or as soon as the building's design was completed. He estimated that the resort could open within five years after the start of construction. The overall development was initially projected to cost over MOP 20 billion, and would more than double the operator's hotel rooms in the special administrative regions of China (SAR). The development's designs were advanced throughout 2010 and early 2011.

=== Land concession contract (2011) ===
As of May 16, 2011, Steve Wynn was expecting the Government of Macau to approve the application for the Cotai resort shortly, with construction to begin right after. Wynn stated to the press in May 2011, "I believe the Cotai project is the best work we have done... it has many new things and new approaches to the way the property is presented.... now that we have nine years of experience in Macau, as you saw with [Encore at Wynn Macau] we are learning how to really address the emotional and physical needs of our guests." At the time, Wynn estimated that the proposed hotel-casino would need around 9,000 staff.

Wynn Macau announced on September 12, 2011 that it had accepted a land concession contract from the Macau government to develop 51 acres (210,000 m^{2}) of the plot. Specifically, the contract permitted Wynn Resorts (Macau) S.A. and Wynn Resort's Palo Estate Company Ltd unit to develop a resort containing a five-star hotel, gaming areas, retail, entertainment, food and beverage outlets, a spa, and convention offerings. Under the contract, Palo Estate will lease the land from the Macau government for an initial term of 25 years, with a right to renew the lease. On top of a US$193 million land premium payment to the Macau government, Palo must also pay $771,738 in yearly rent during the resort's development phase, which increases to $1 million in yearly rent after development is complete. In December 2011, Wynn made a deposit of $62.6 million for the land, with eight more projected payments of $16.4 million. At the time, the project's overall budget was estimated at $2.5 billion, with design still in flux.

Wynn Macau Limited acquired a group of Jiaqing period (1796-1820) porcelain vases at a Christie's London auction on 7 July 2011. The vases were purchased for £8 million ($12.8 million). "We are delighted to return works of this extraordinary quality to the city of Macau and the People’s Republic of China," Roger Thomas, executive vice president of Design for Wynn Design and Development, said after the sale. The Qing dynasty vases were on display at Wynn Palace and a sixteenth-century Louis XIV Beauvais Chinoiserie tapestry of 'The Emperor on a Journey,' is on display at Wynn Macau. Other art at Wynn Macau includes a Louis Rigal drawing, Macanese silk embroidery, a Louis XIV silk tapestry, two cloisonné camels, and Ming Dynasty statuary.

=== Approval and groundbreaking (2012-2013) ===
On May 1, 2012, Wynn Macau received formal approval from the Macau government for its Cotai resort, paving the way for ground to be broken on the 21-hectare (51-acre) site. on the plot. A cost was not revealed at the time, though financing would be mostly cash and partly loans. Wynn Macau, Ltd announced on June 5, 2012, that it had started the first stage of construction, with an estimated cost of US$4 billion and a projected construction timeline of around four years. Overall, the development would equal 557,000 square metres (6,000,000 ft^{2}), with the height of the skyscraper restricted to 120 metres (390 ft) due to a nearby airport. The resort's design as of June 2012 included a hotel with convention space, shops, entertainment, ten restaurants, 500 gaming tables, a spa, meeting rooms, and a nightclub named 'Climax,' among other attractions. While no real estate projects were announced as part of the new casino resort, Wynn did state that there was space to develop such properties if policy allowed.

Pre-foundation work started in February 2013, with the name of the new skyscraper, Wynn Palace, first announced on July 29, 2013. Steve Wynn described Wynn Palace as "the most aggressive, ambitious and lovely project" he had ever undertaken, outlining new attractions such as gondolas, pedestal gardens, and a 30,000-square-metre (320,000 ft^{2}) performance lake at the entrance and a 1,700-room hotel. The construction firm Leighton Asia finalized a US$2.6 billion design and build contract on July 30, 2013 to construct Wynn Palace, with clients listed as Wynn Resorts (Macau) S.A. and Palo Real Estate Development Company S.A. Leighton Asia projected a 2016 completion date for Wynn Palace. Wynn Macau, Ltd had invested a total of US$519 million in the project by the summer of 2013, with US$109.9 million invested during that year's third quarter.

=== Initial construction stages (2014-2015) ===
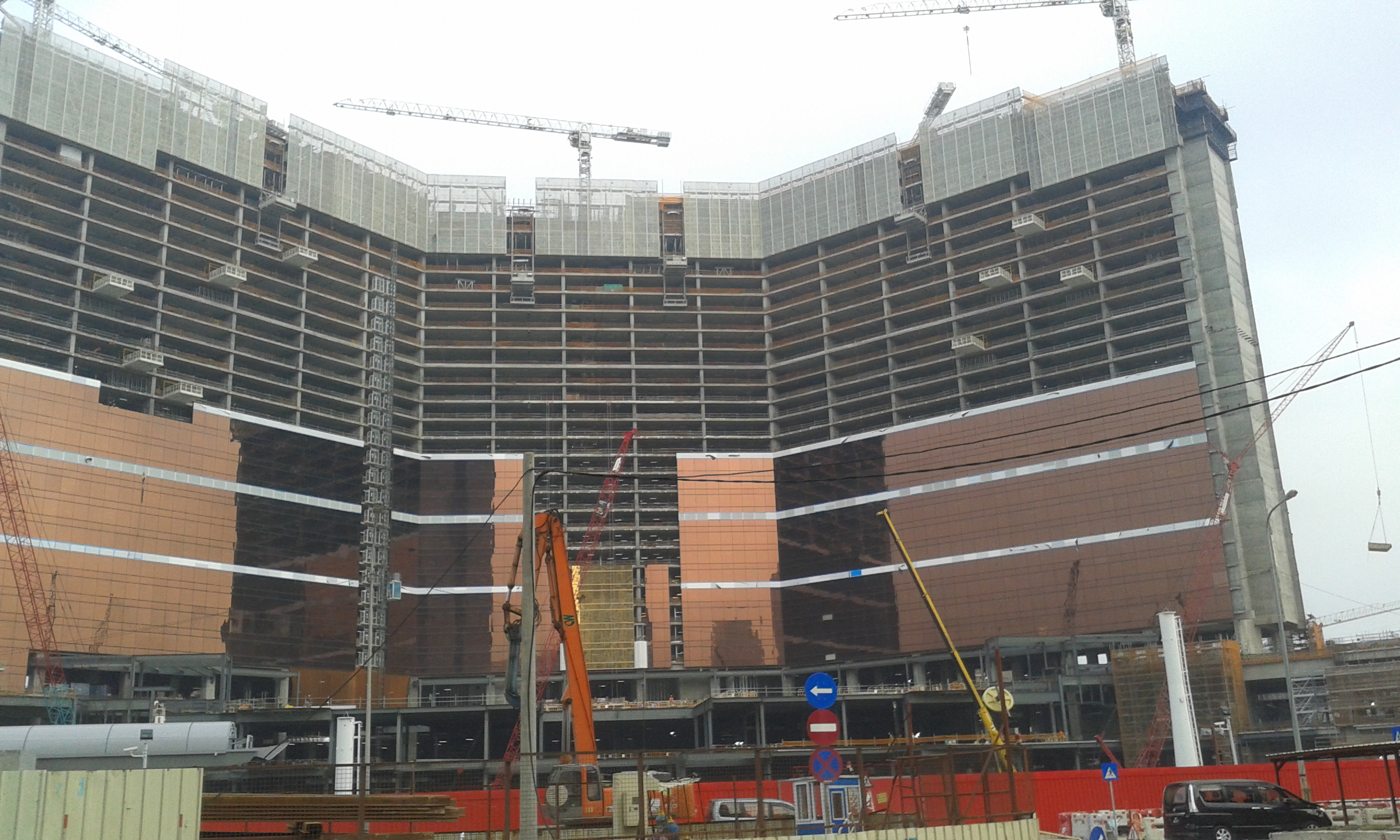
Under construction in January 2015

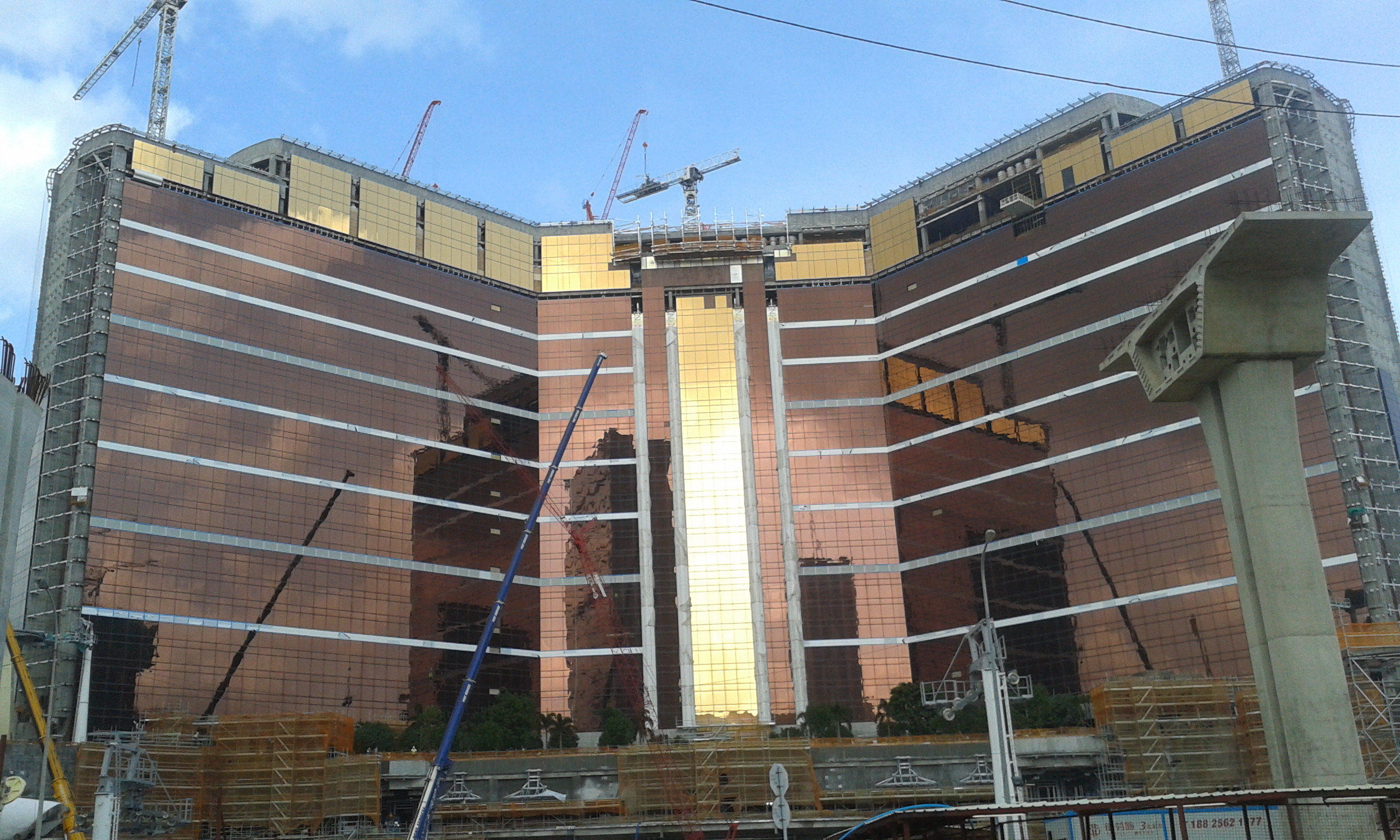
Under construction in August 2015

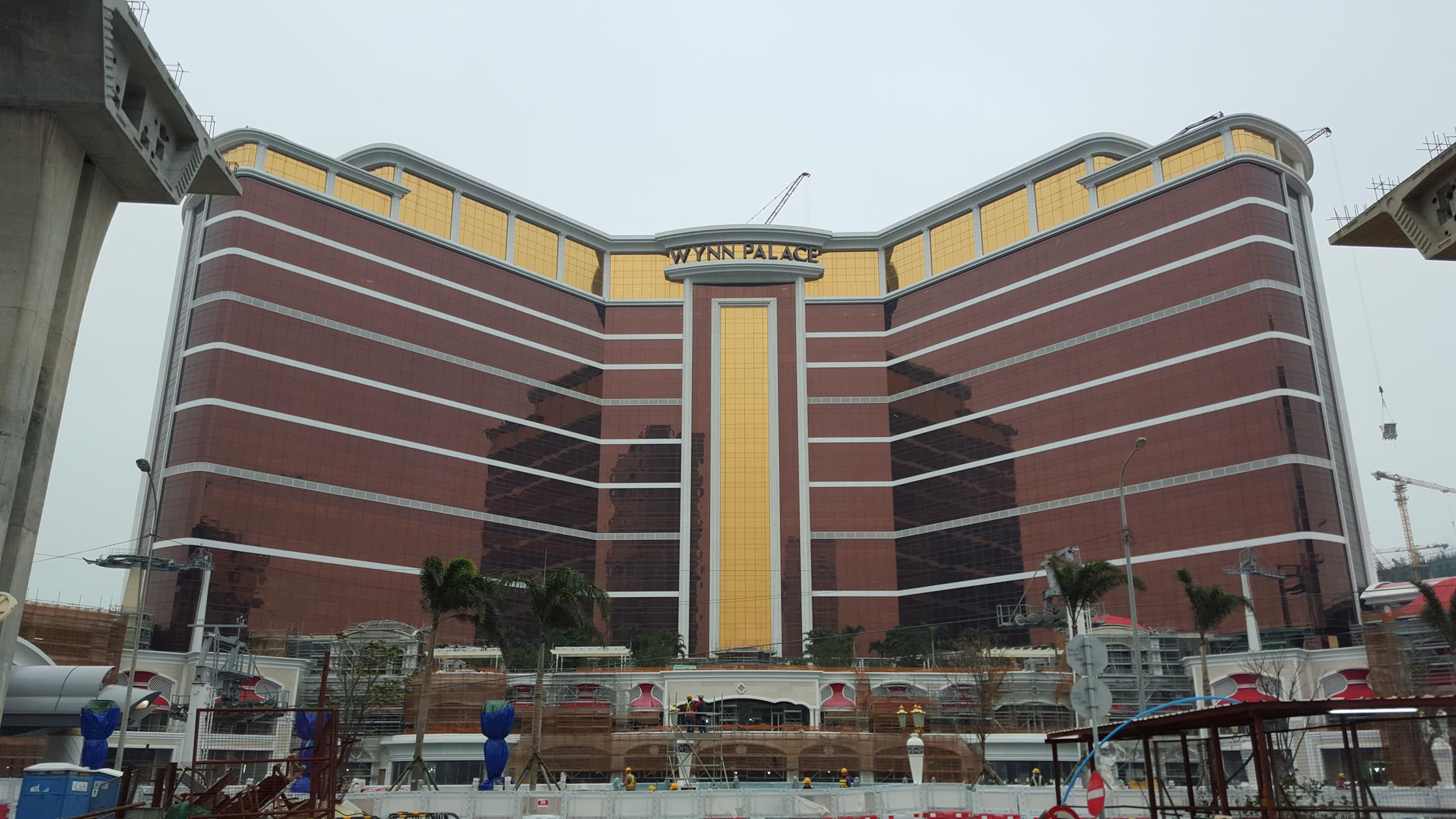
Under construction in February 2016

By the summer of 2014, Wynn Macau, Ltd was one of only six licensed casino operators in Macau. In July 2014, Reuters reported that Macau's corruption agency was examining the 2008 sale of Wynn's Cotai land plot for signs of graft, after the International Union of Operating Engineers requested an inquiry into "how a little-known company [like Tien Chiao Entertainment and Investment Company had] secured rights to land before it was granted to Wynn." In response, Macau's Land, Public Works and Transport Bureau announced that the land grant had followed legal procedures.

Foundations for the Wynn Palace were being laid by July 2014. During the ensuing construction process, at one point eleven tower cranes from Comansa CM were being used simultaneously. Work commenced on the casino's interior design in October 2014, with Chinese interior decoration subcontractor Sundart projecting completion for November 2015. On February 2, 2015, Wynn Macau, Ltd announced that the opening of Wynn Palace had been delayed, and would no longer take place before the February 2016 Chinese New Year. The delay resulted from late and incomplete approval of workers permits, with Barron's Asia explaining that "they received only 700 workers after requesting 1000 and the approvals came three months late. Wynn said they need a total of 7000 workers, which means they need approvals for another 1600-1700." The resort announced it was still on budget despite the delay, with a new estimated launch for the first half of 2016.

=== Final construction stages (2015-2016) ===
Approximately US$374.3 million was invested into the Wynn Palace Cotai project during the first quarter of 2015, making the accumulative investment equal to US$2.2 billion. As of April 2015, the total projected budget including "construction costs, capitalized interest, pre-opening expenses, land costs and financing fees" was US$4.1 billion. Wynn Macau, Ltd was seeking government approval for 500 gaming tables by the fall of 2015. In November 2015, around 130 non-resident construction workers for Wynn Palace staged a meeting outside the PRC Liaison Office, alleging unpaid and involuntary overtime. The Labour Affairs Bureau (DSAL) subsequently stated that it had been aware of the situation since October 2015, and had promised staff to examine the issue. Also in November 2015, general construction delays pushed the projected opening back three months, from March 25, 2016 to the original date of June 25, 2016. As a result, Leighton Holdings (then renamed CIMIC) lost access to a US$38 million bonus. Wynn Resorts share values fell 6 percent after the announcement, before rising again shortly afterwards. Wynn Macau, Ltd stated in January 2016 that if substantial delays continued, CIMIC might be liable for a maximum of US$200 million in damages. Following a further update, the current expected opening date is August 22, 2016.

Although Wynn Palace was built to have space for 500 gaming tables, it was reported that Wynn Palace had only been allotted 100 gaming tables at opening, with 50 more to be allotted before 2019. As a result, Wynn moved 250 of their approved tables from nearby Wynn Macau to Wynn Palace, leaving to a total of 350 tables at Wynn Palace and 270 at Wynn Macau. Sixty of the 400 total tables at the casino are devoted to VIP guests, a high concentration in comparison to other Cotai casinos.

=== Opening and reception ===
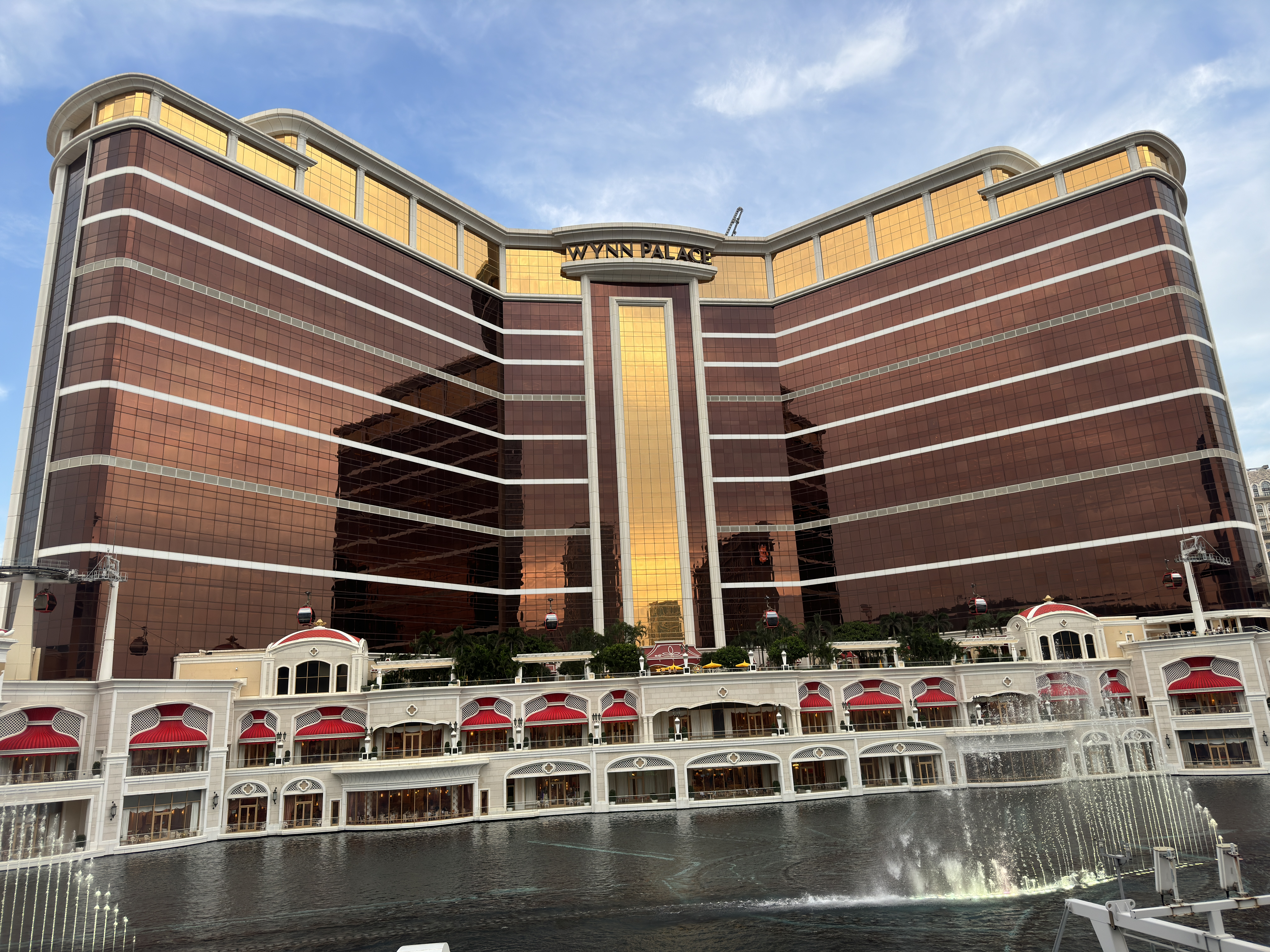
Wynn Palace as seen during the day in 2024

On January 28, 2016, Forbes described Wynn Palace's upcoming debut as one of the "20 Most Anticipated Hotel Openings Of 2016." Despite an effort on behalf of the Chinese government to make new Cotai casinos into family-friendly attractions, before the opening Steve Wynn described Wynn Palace as "for adults" and "pitched at 21-year-olds or above." On August 22, 2016, Steve Wynn unveiled the resort at an event officiated by political figures such as Chui Sai On of Macau. The official opening time for the casino was 8 pm on a Monday, considered a time of cultural significance, with opening ceremonies held around the musical fountain and in the ballroom. The Macau Post Daily wrote the following day that the opening drew "big crowds to Cotai to try their luck in the new casino," and Wynn Palace's design met with a positive response.

A week after the resort's opening, analysts claimed the casino had caused a "lackluster" to "marginal" increase in mass-market customers in Macau, with Credit Suisse reporting that VIP business to Macau remained consistent. Although Cotai's gambling profits had been steadily dropping since 2014 due to government crackdowns on corruption, among other factors, Macau's gross gaming revenue (GGR) grew 1.1% for the month of August to $2.4 billion, "the first growth since May 2014 and beating street estimate of 1.5% decline." Barron's credited "Macau casino operators" and the opening of Wynn Palace for the increase. Opining that Macau was experiencing a market "revival," on September 16, 2016, Nasdaq reported that the shares of Wynn Resorts had "rallied to a 52-week high." For Wynn Resorts, "gross gaming revenues for the month of August rose 1.1%," and AFR Weekend wrote that Wynn Resorts' "gamble" in Macau had paid off, per "signs that revenue in the gambling mecca has passed a key inflection point."

== Features ==
=== Design and architecture ===
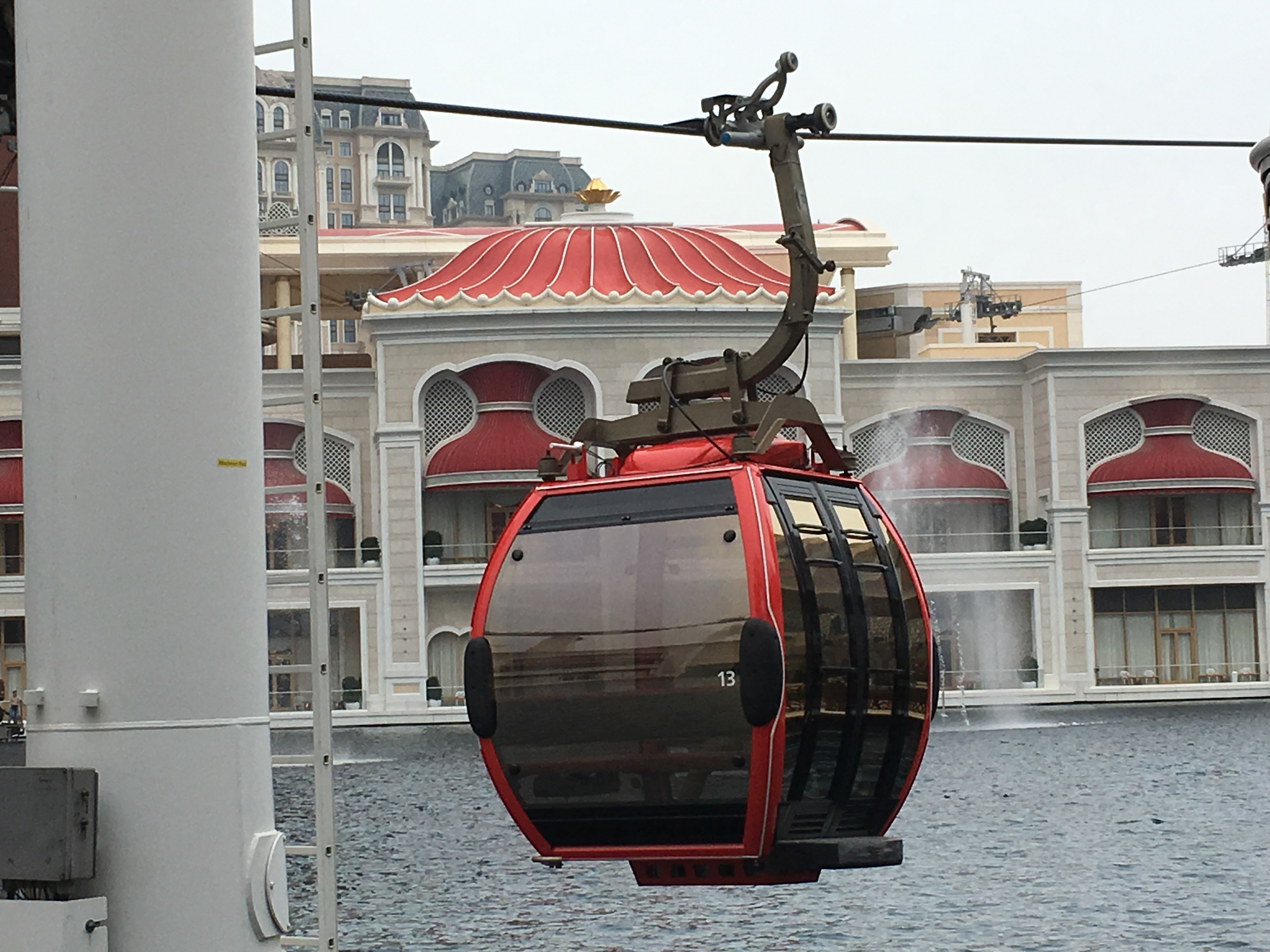
cable car at Wynn Palace

Opened on August 22, 2016, the Wynn Palace resort in Cotai includes a 1706-room luxury hotel, a casino, convention space, a spa and salon, and venues for retail, entertainment, and dining. Steve Wynn described it as "the most aggressive, ambitious and lovely project" he has ever undertaken, with a design "reminiscent" of the Bellagio in its use of fountains and lighting as a key attraction. With a construction floor area of around 450,000 square metres (4,800,000 ft^{2}), after topping off in 2015 the main Wynn Palace tower is 115.00 metres (377.30 ft) tall, with 29 floors and design by Wynn Design & Development.

=== Attractions and venues ===
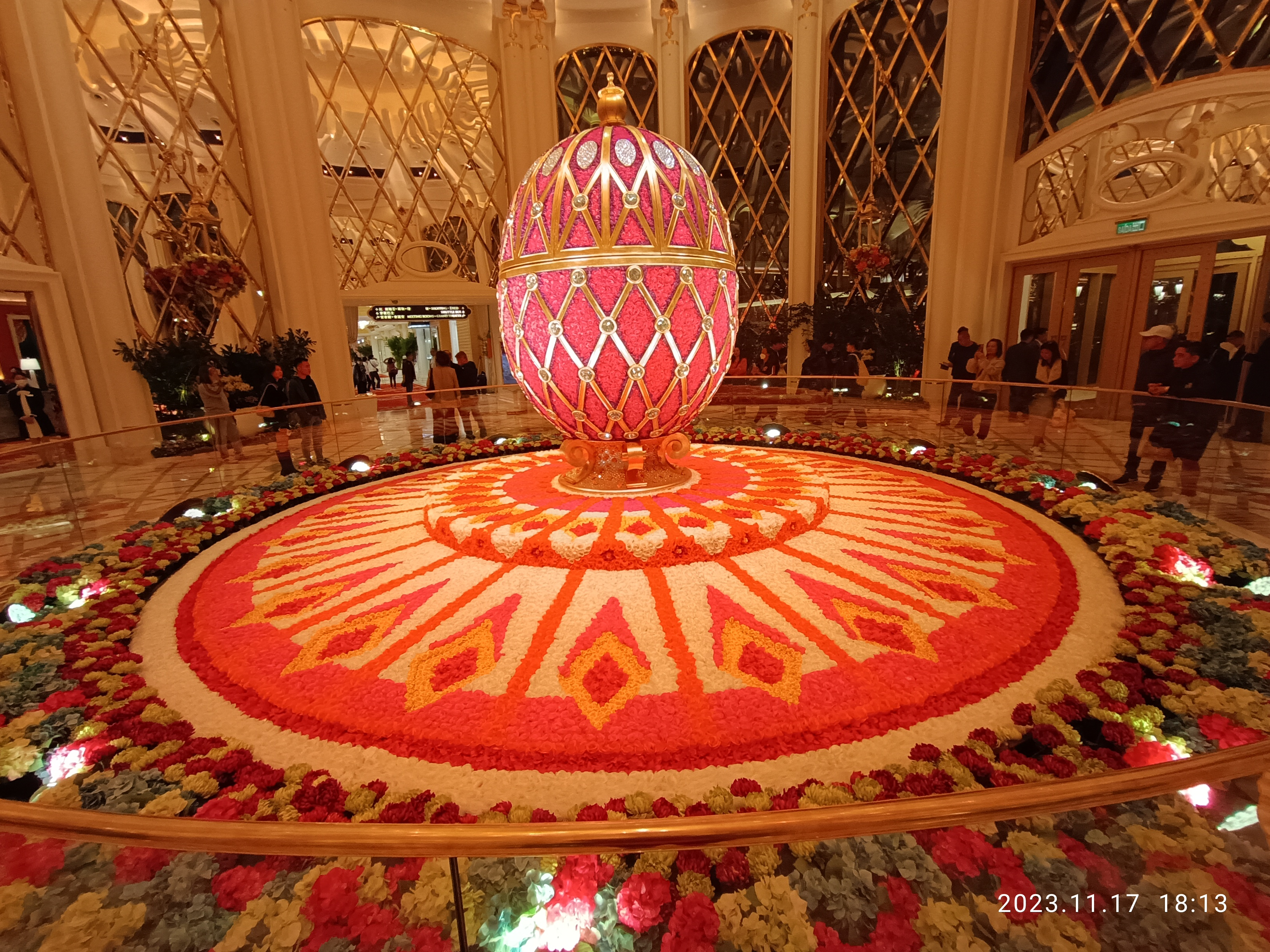
Faberge egg in Wynn Palace lobby

The resort features a number of attractions and venues, including convention space, shops, restaurants, gaming tables, and meeting rooms. There are 9,848 square metres (106,000 ft^{2}) of retail space in the Wynn Palace Esplanade, and as of September 2016, brands such as Chanel, Chopard, Hermès, Franck Muller, Panerai and Brioni had set up outlets. There are thirteen dining venues in Wynn Palace, with five fine dining restaurants, and eight casual. One of the luxury restaurants, Wing Lei Palace, was designed by Roger Thomas.

GOCO Hospitality operates a 4,497 square metres (48,410 ft^{2}) spa area.

Exterior features include an aerial transport system with gondolas, pedestal gardens, and a 26,783-square-metre (288,290 ft^{2}) Performance Lake at the entrance. The Performance Lake is a choreographed dancing fountain created by WET, with more than 1,000 jets and 2,000 lights that are synchronized to various broadway musical, classical, Chinese traditional, and western songs.

=== Interior design and artwork ===
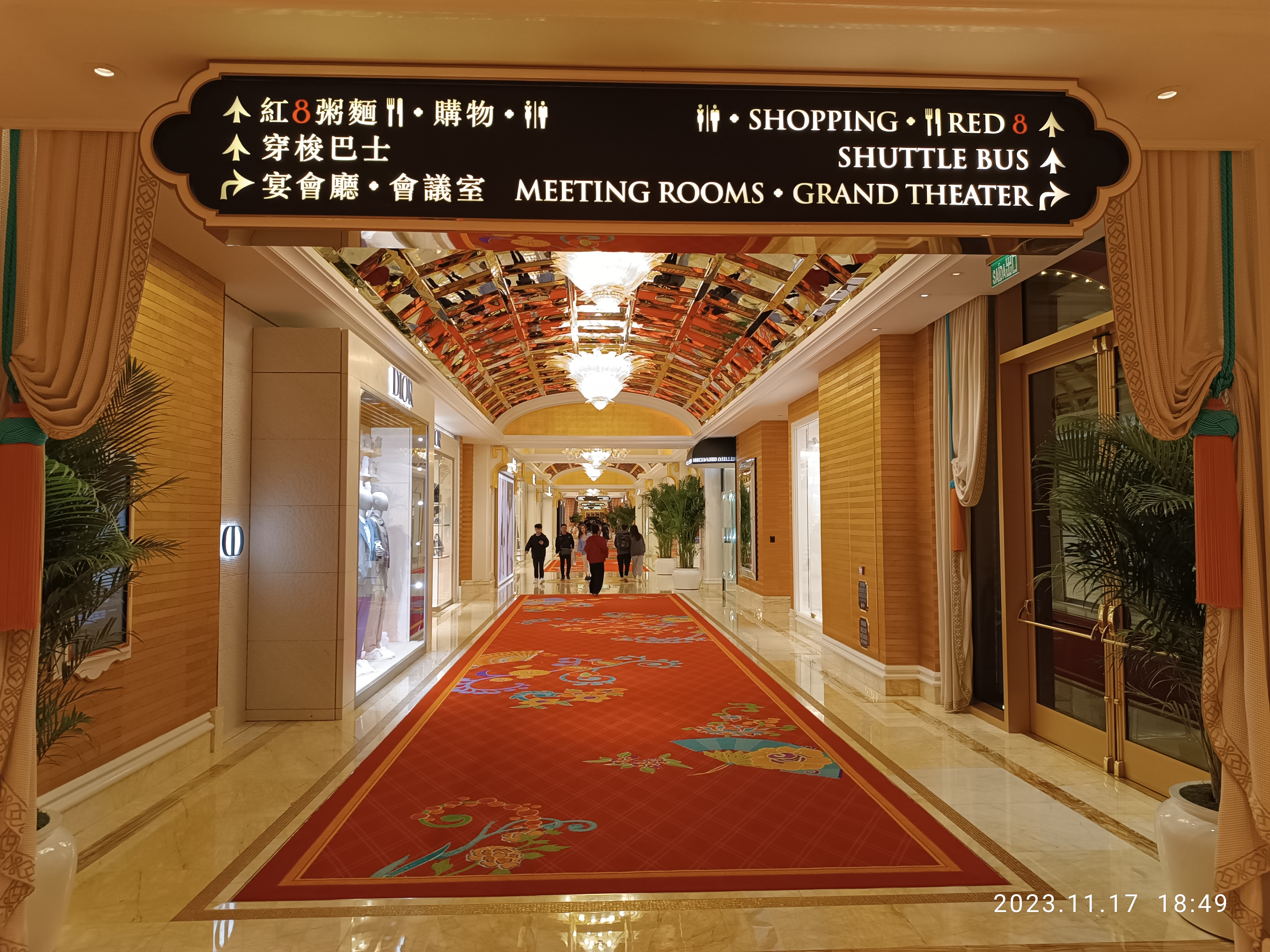
Retail area at Wynn Palace

Steve Wynn described the interior design theme as "flowers," explaining the "use of... water and natural light and flowers has been taken to a new level." Jerry Sibal was appointed Design, Development and Floral Director for Wynn Palace in April 2015, arriving in Macau that September. The Chinese interior design subcontractor Sundart published several photos of the Wynn Palace design in June 2015, displaying a floral theme. Some of the floral sculptures move. There is floral designer Preston Bailey's floral carousel and Ferris wheel in the atriums, among other projects.

Fine art and Chinese antiques are display at the resort, including $150 million of art at opening. Wynn Macau, Ltd, first paid £8 million (US$12.8 million) at a London auction on July 7, 2011, for a set of four 18th-century Chinese porcelain vases, as well as a Chinoiserie tapestry.

== Future developments ==
Announced on 10 July 2019 by Wynn Resorts, Wynn Palace was to undergo an over $2 billion expansion. The expansion, to be completed in two phases, will primarily be focusing on non-gaming assets such as a theater and sculpture gardens. Two hotel towers housing approximately 1,300 rooms are also part of the expansion plans.

Phase 1 of the expansion will see the addition of an all-new 650-room hotel tower, an immersive theater, a food pavilion, art sculpture gardens, and a glass and steel structure in the shape of a water lily named The Crystal Pavilion. Construction was expected to begin in late 2021 and be completed by 2024 on the southern portion of Wynn Palace's land concession. In September 2020, the vice-chairman and COO of Wynn Macau Limited announced that the design phase has been completed.

Phase 2 of the expansion will see the addition of another hotel tower housing 650 rooms. Details for this phase have yet to be confirmed.

== Gallery ==
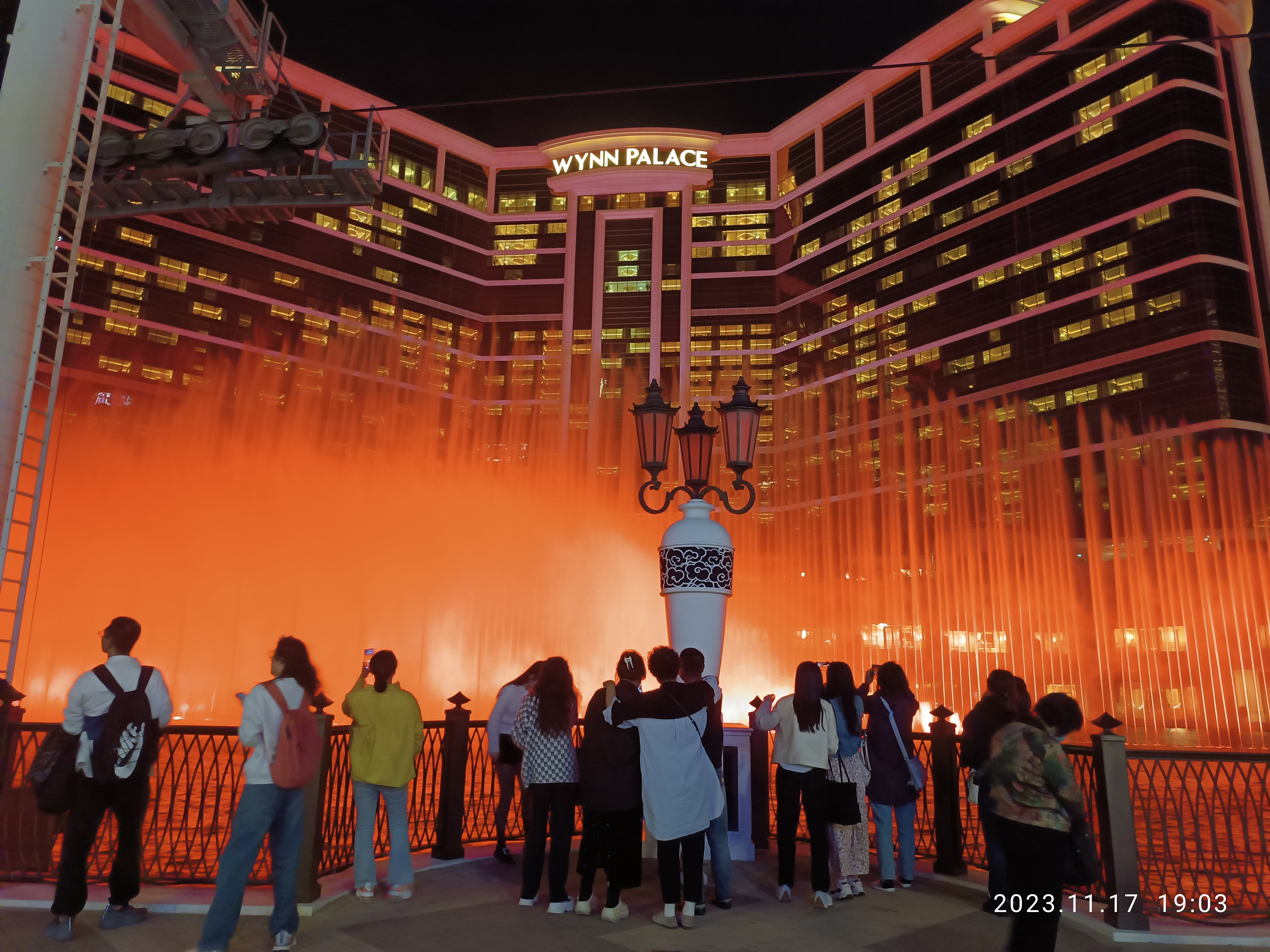
Fountain show at night

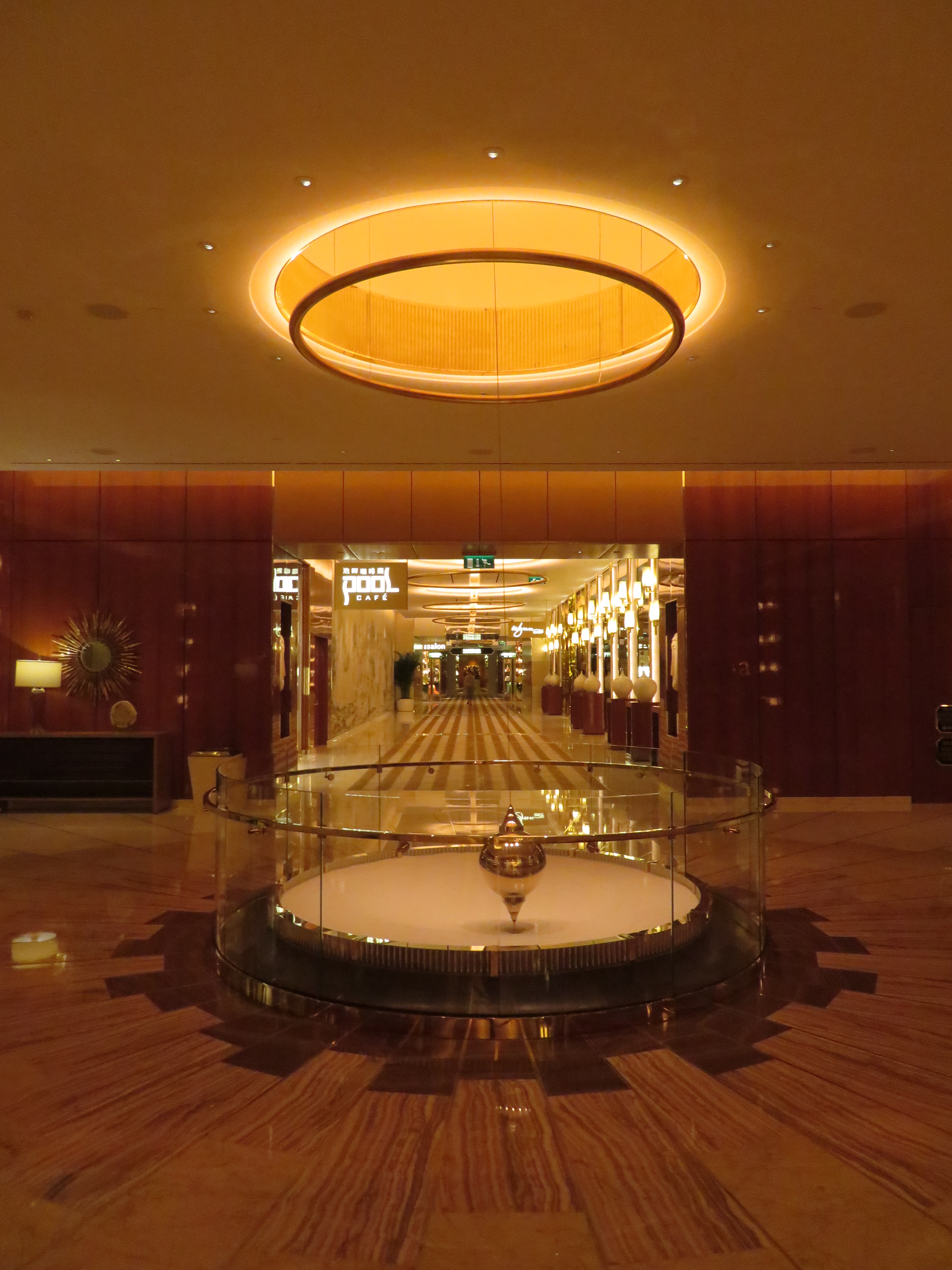
Foucault Pendulum inside Wynn Palace

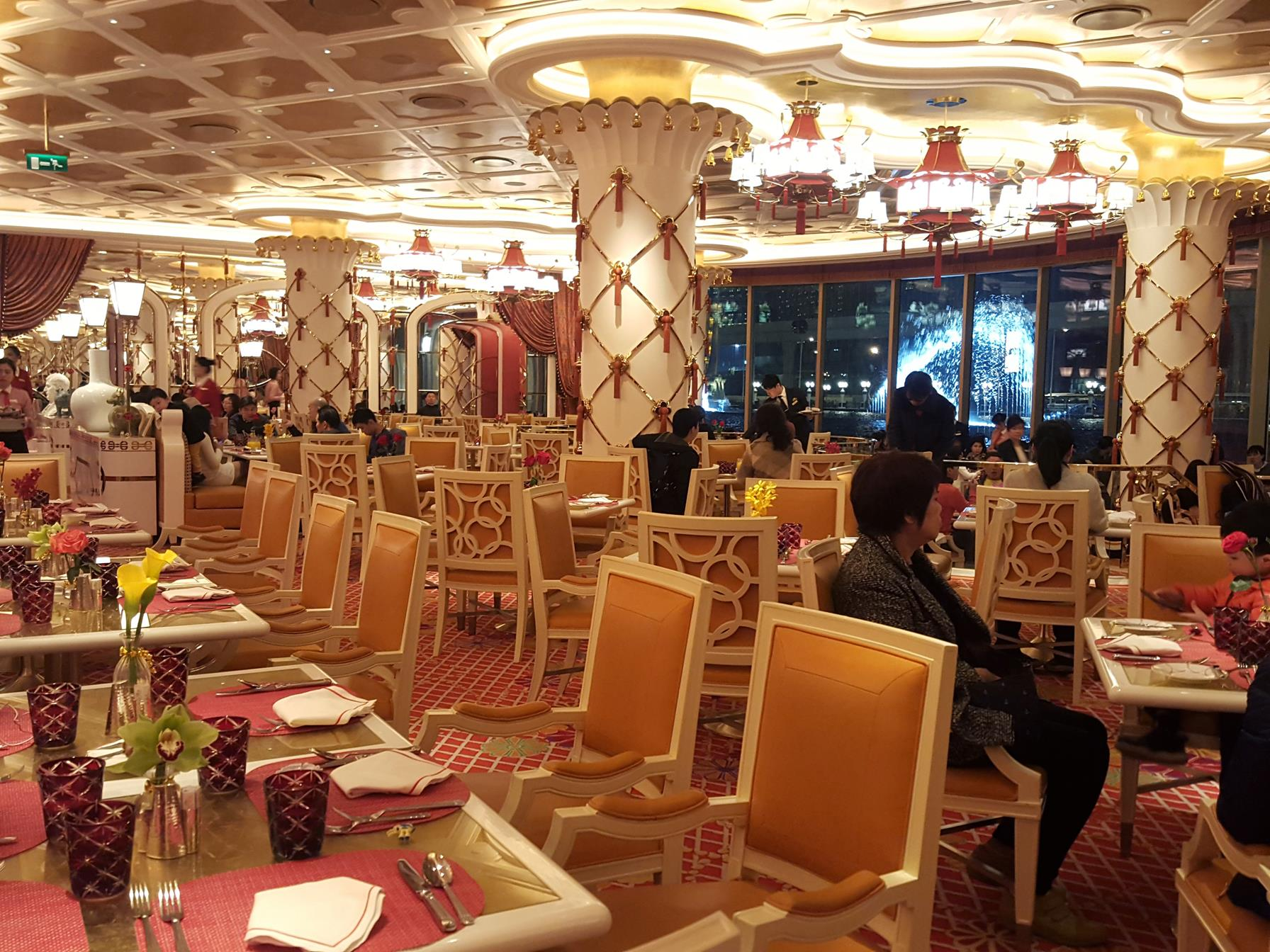
View of fountain show from inside restaurant

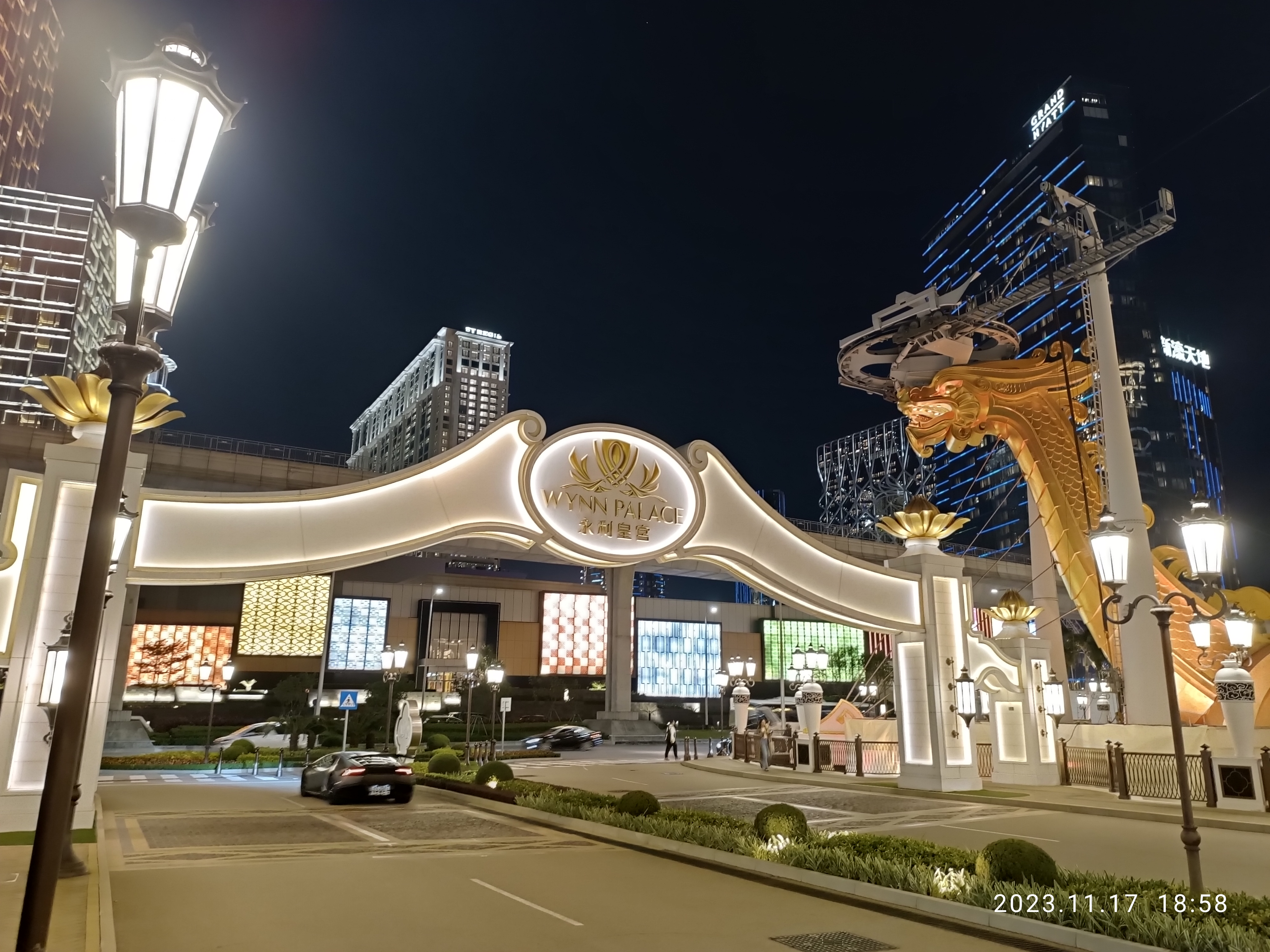
Roadside entrance to Wynn Palace

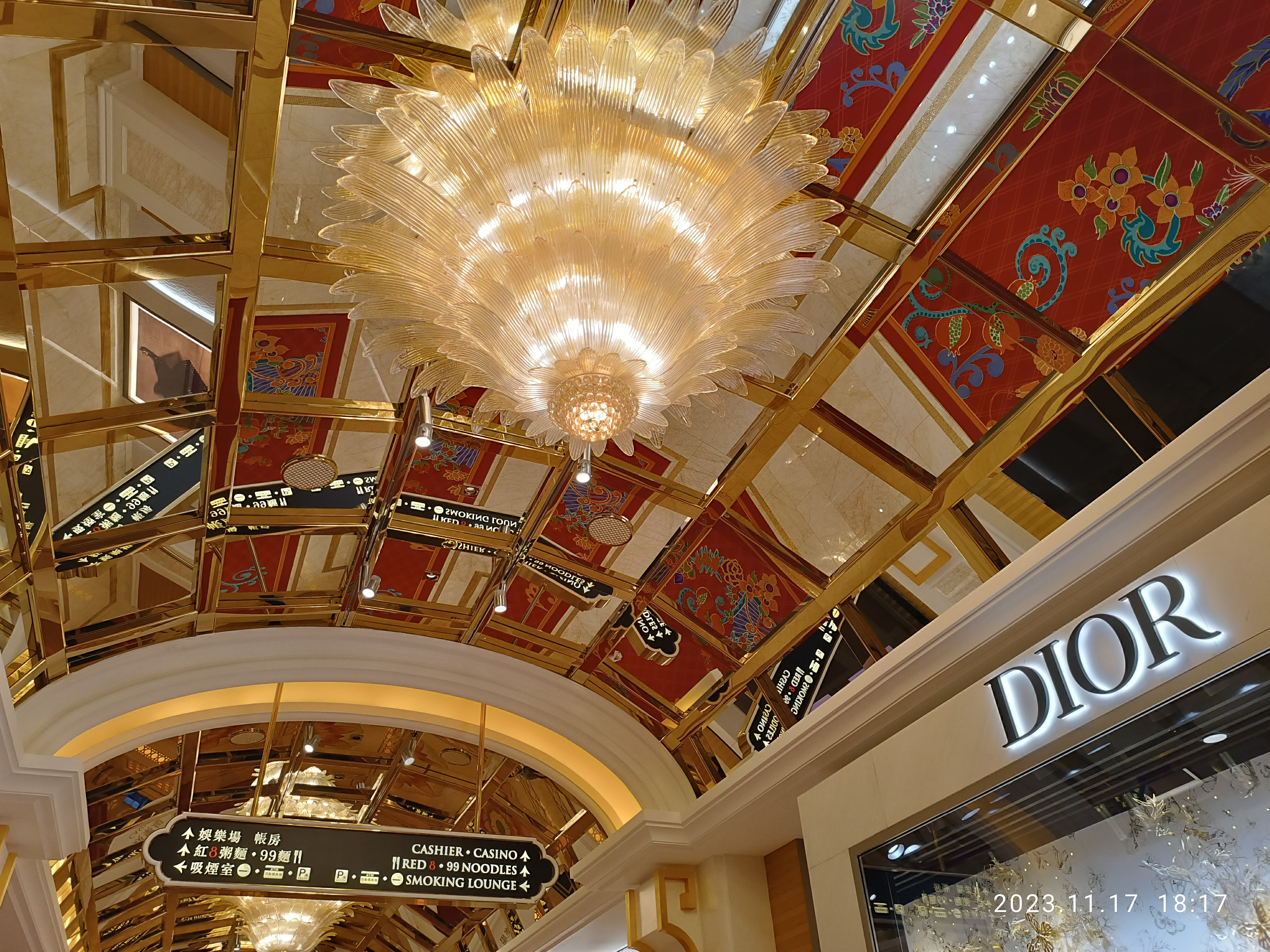
Mirrored ceiling inside shopping area

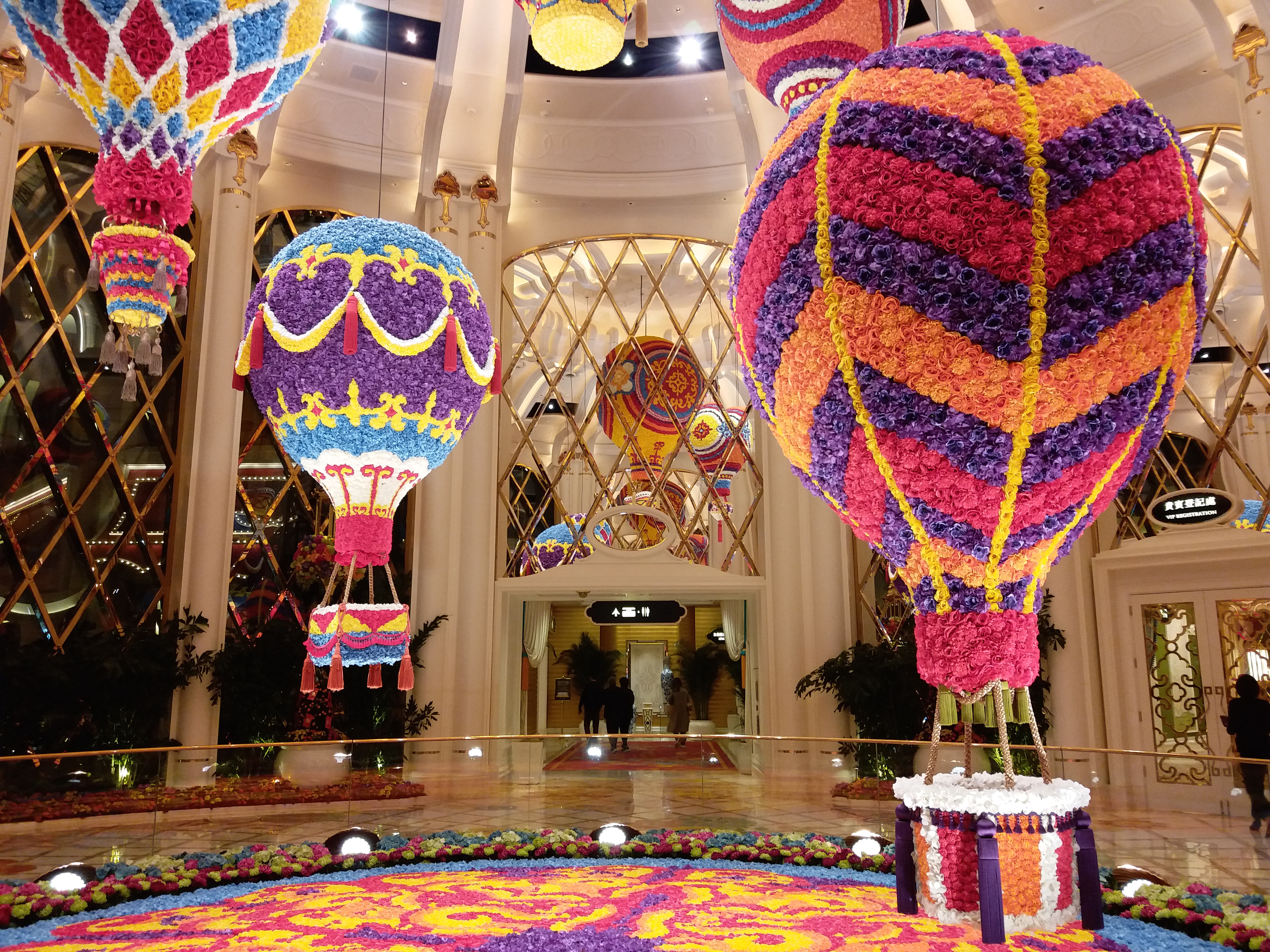
Flower display shaped as hot air balloons

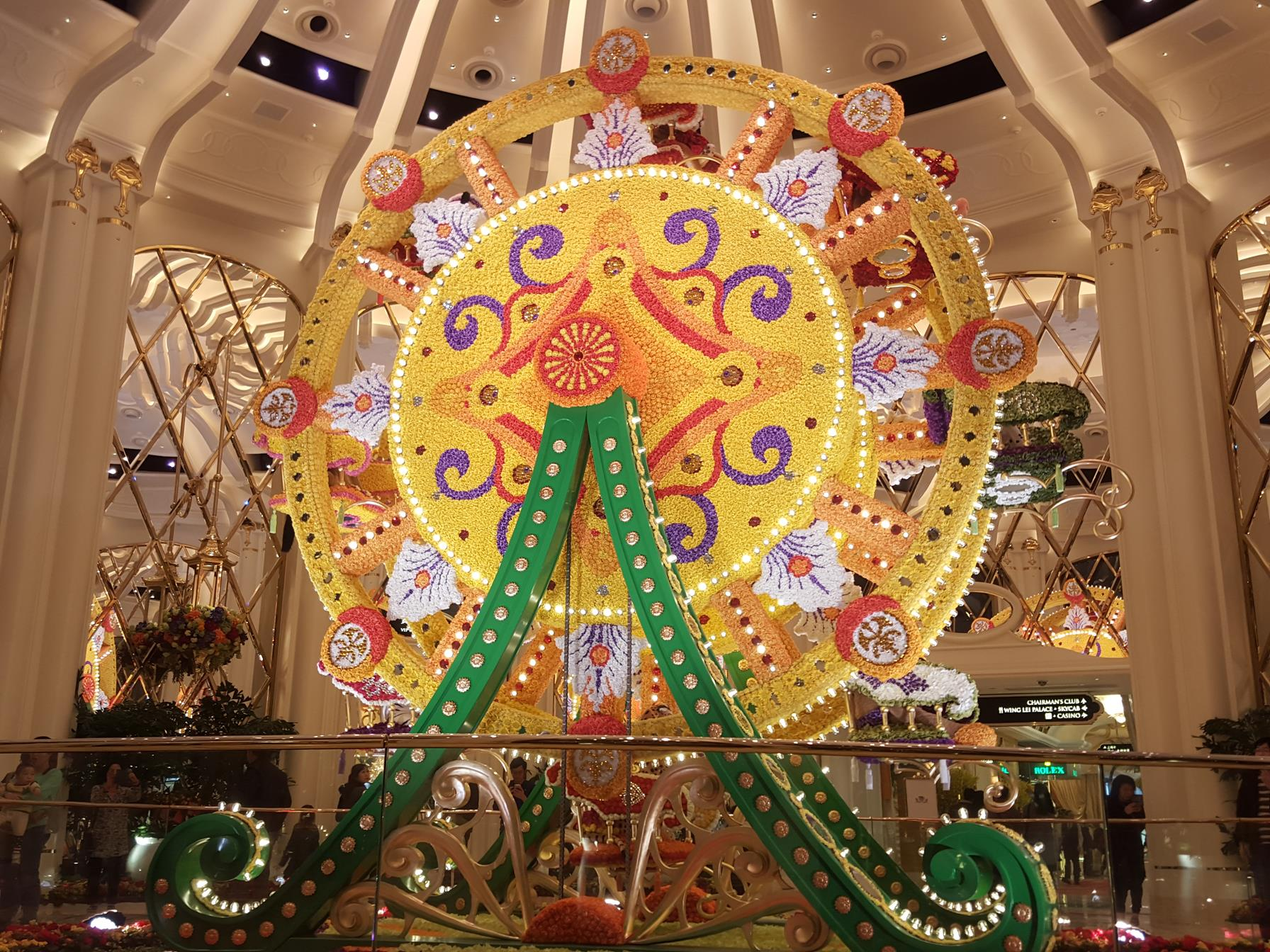
Flower display in the shape of a Ferris wheel

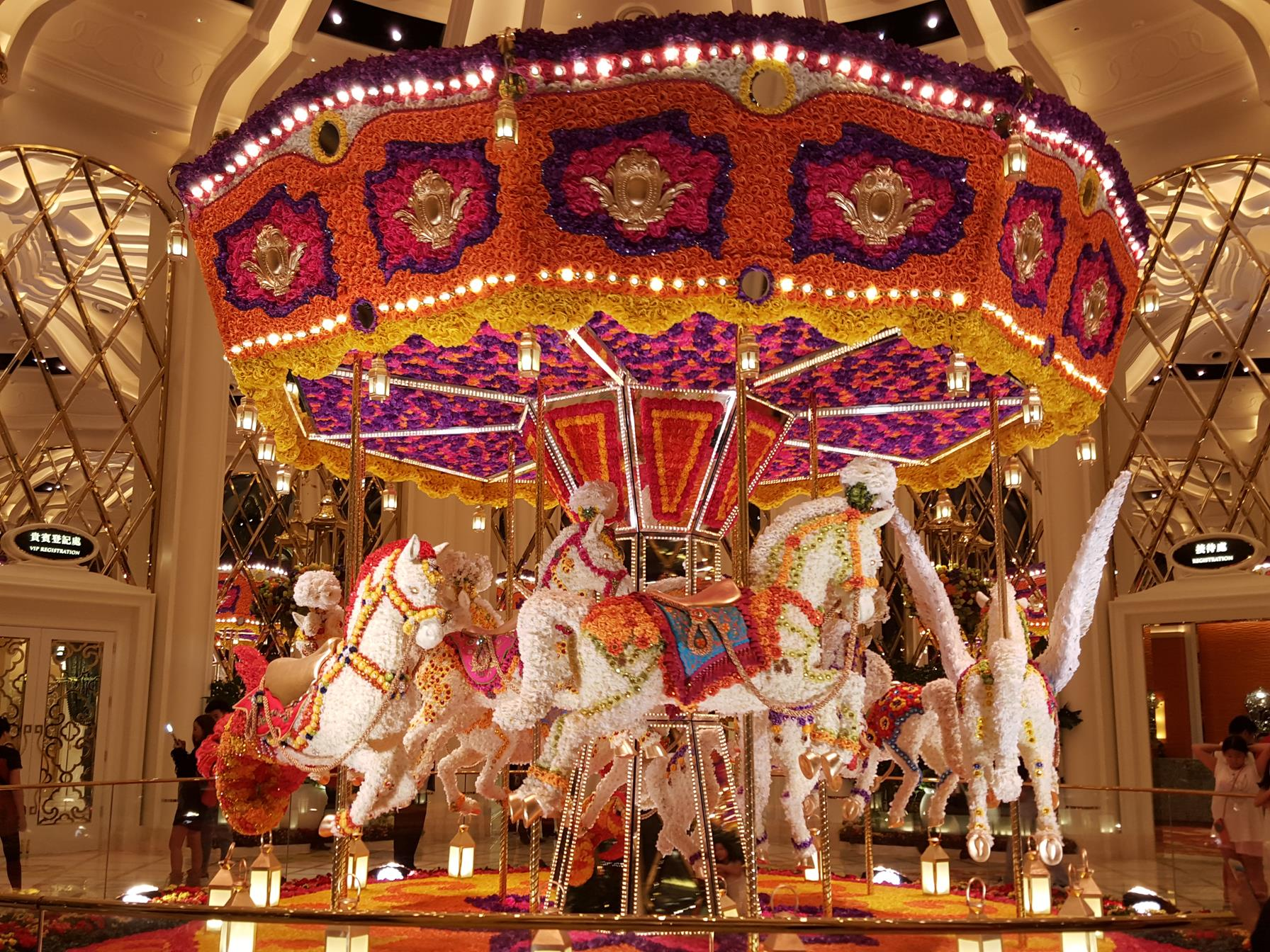
Flower display of a carousel

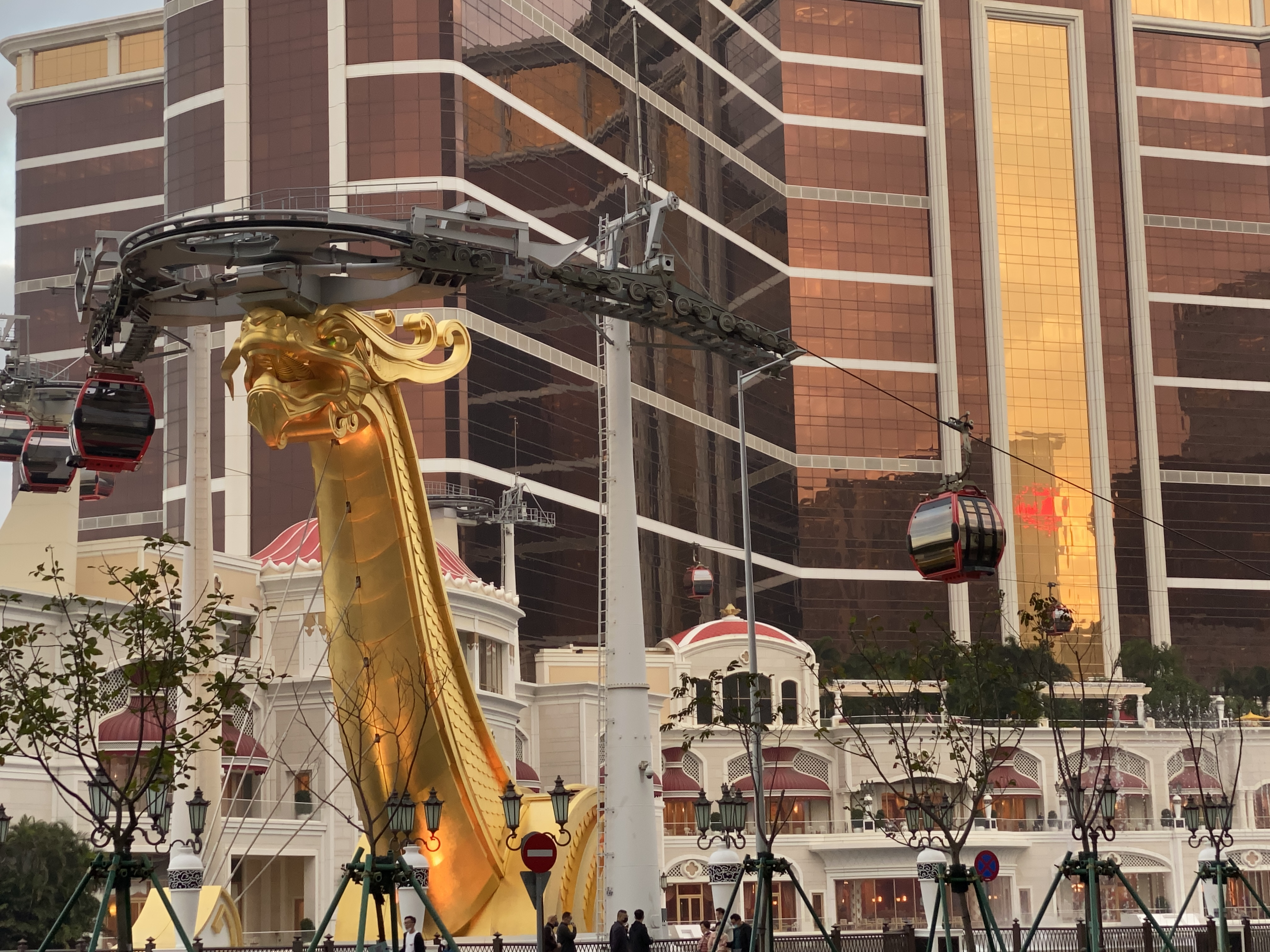
Cable cars

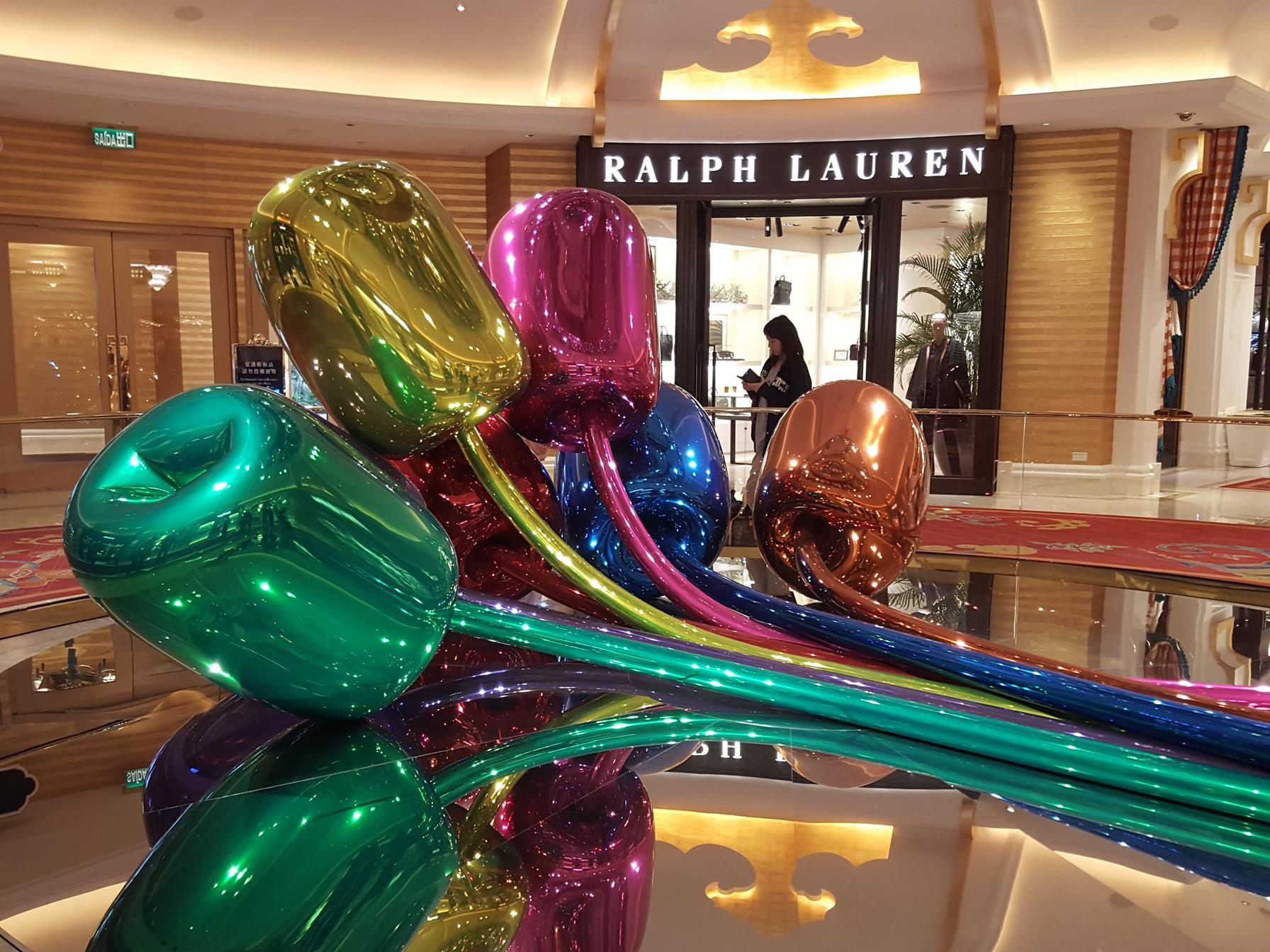
Modern art in the shopping area

== See also ==
- Gambling in Macau
- Cotai Strip
- List of properties on the Cotai Strip
- List of tallest buildings in Macau
- List of Macau casinos
- List of integrated resorts
