= Nate Mack =

American banker

- Born: January 27, 1891; Mielec, Poland
- Died: 1965 (aged 73–74)
- Occupation: Banker
- Spouse: Jenny Solomon
- Children: Jerome D. Mack
- Relatives: Karen Mack (granddaughter)

Nathan Mack (1891–1965) was a Polish-born American banker. He was the co-founder of the Bank of Nevada and Temple Beth Sholom.

== Early life ==
Nathan Mack was born to a Jewish family on January 27, 1891, in Mielec, Poland. He had two brothers, Harry and Louis. Mack was the first member of his family to emigrate to the United States, and he was subsequently reunited with his brothers, who invested in real estate.

== Career ==
Mack was the owner of a supermarket in Los Angeles, California in the 1920s. By 1929, he moved to Las Vegas, Nevada, where he opened a haberdashery. He moved to Reno in 1936, followed by Boulder City, only to return to Las Vegas. Over the years, he "sold tires and batteries, ran a towing service and wrecking yard, sold produce, and owned a clothing store, a liquor store, and a Fremont Street bar."

Mack got into the gambling industry by installing jukeboxes from Rock-Ola and slot machines from Jennings & Company in bars throughout central and southern Nevada, including Beatty, Manhattan, Pioche, Round Mountain and Tonopah. Mack took home half the profits. Subsequently, Mack invested in land and casinos with businessmen Sanford Adler, Gus Greenbaum, Charlie Resnick, Art Rosen and Moe Sedway.

Mack was responsible for the establishment of the Las Vegas Sun, the main newspaper in Las Vegas, when he loaned US$1,000 to its founder Hank Greenspun in 1950.

Mack co-founded the Bank of Las Vegas with his son and other investors in 1954. Mack served as its chairman while Walter E. Cosgriff was its president until he was succeeded by E. Parry Thomas in 1961. The bank focused on loaning money to casinos in Las Vegas.

Mack became "one of the most influential citizens of Las Vegas".

== Judaism ==
With his wife, Mack co-founded "Sons and Daughters of Israel" in Las Vegas, which is the oldest Jewish congregation in Nevada. He served as its second president from 1945 to 1949. The congregation later became known as Temple Beth Sholom.

Mack served as the president of the Jewish Community Center of Las Vegas. He was also the Nevada chairman of the United Jewish Appeal.

== Personal life ==
Mack married Jenny Solomon. They had a son, Jerome D. Mack.

An elementary school in Henderson, Nevada opened in 1983 bearing Mack's name. His son would later get a middle school named after him in 2006.

== Death ==
Mack died in 1965.
