= Benjamin N. Maltz =

- Born: 1901; Chicago, Illinois, USA
- Died: 1993 (aged 91–92)
- Occupations: Banker; Philanthropist
- Employer: City National Bank
- Children: Elaine (Maltz) Goldsmith
- Relatives: Bram Goldsmith (son-in-law); Russell Goldsmith (grandson)

Benjamin N. Maltz (1901–1993) was an American banker and philanthropist. He was the first Chairman of the City National Bank (NYSE: CYN).

== Early life ==
Benjamin N. Maltz was born in 1901 in Chicago, Illinois. He started his career as a whisky broker in Chicago.

== Banking career ==
In 1954, Maltz was hired as the first chairman of the Board of City National Bank, a new bank founded by Alfred S. Hart based in Beverly Hills, California. Over the years, the bank became known as the "bank of the stars," bankrolling many American movie stars.

== Philanthropy ==
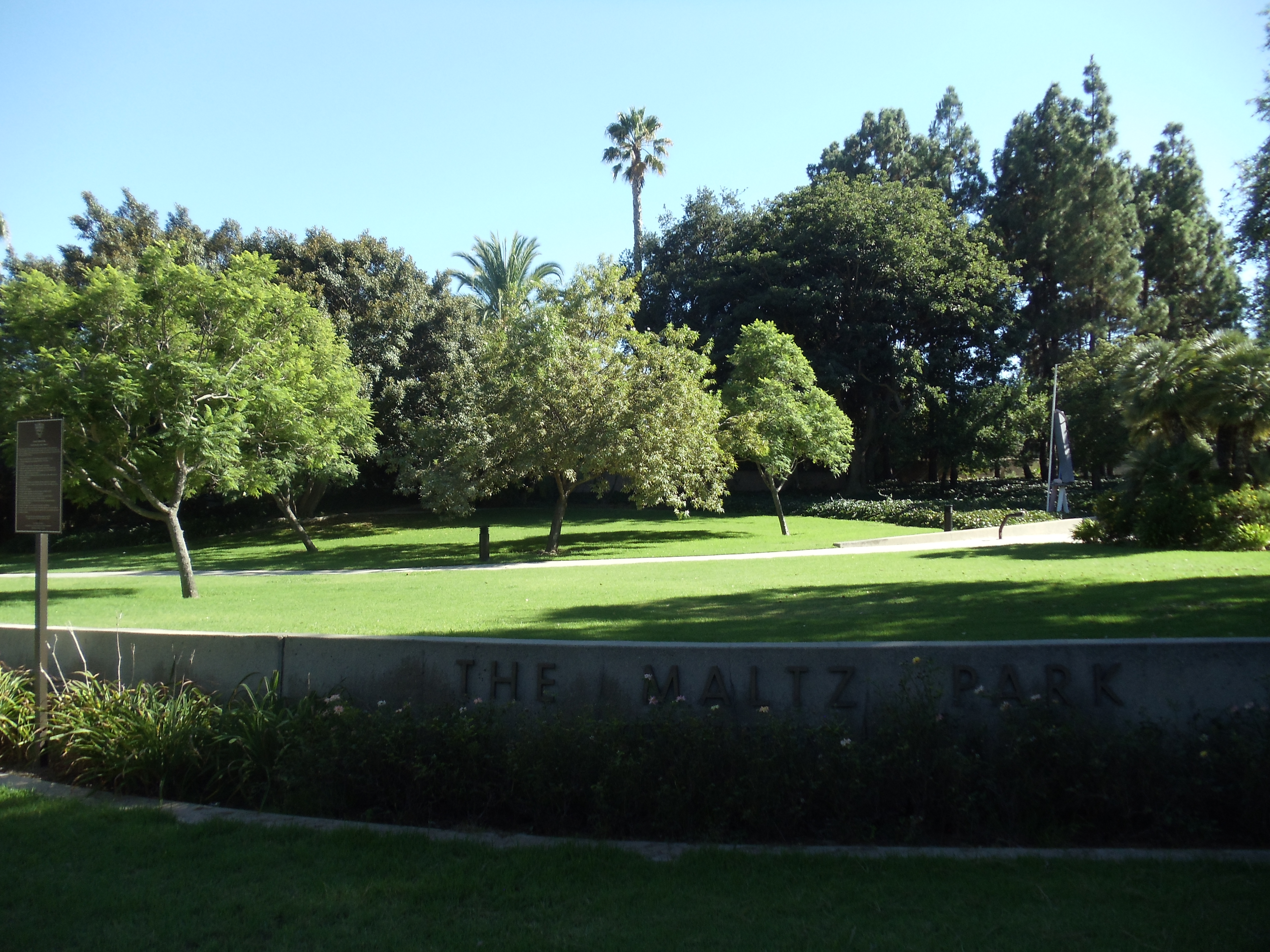
The Maltz Park in Beverly Hills, California

Maltz made many charitable donations during his lifetime, believing that those who have been successful must give back to their community. The Ben Maltz Gallery at the Otis College of Art and Design is named in his honor. So is the Maltz Park, located on the corner of Sunset Boulevard and Whittier Drive in Beverly Hills, California.

== Personal life ==
His daughter, Elaine (Maltz) Goldsmith, married Bram Goldsmith, who became the Chairman of City National Bank. Their son, Maltz's grandson, Russell Goldsmith, serves as the current chairman.

== Death ==
Maltz died in 1993.
