= Alfred A. Hart =

American photographer (1816–1908)

- Born: 1816; Norwich, Connecticut
- Died: 1908 (aged 92); San Leandro, California
- Known for: photography
- Notable work: stereoscopic photographs of the Transcontinental Railroad

Alfred A. Hart (1816–1908) was a 19th-century American photographer and artist who served as the official photographer for the Central Pacific Railroad.

== Biography ==
Hart was the official photographer for the Central Pacific Railroad under the patronage of Judge Edwin B. Crocker, one of the Five Associates on the Central Pacific board. Hart documented the building of the western half of the first transcontinental railroad, for which he took 364 historic stereoviews of the railroad construction in the 1860s.

Hart specialized in stereo views and had an intuitive understanding of elements that would best showcase the three-dimensional effects of the format: sharp angles, curving tracks, and layered foregrounds and backgrounds brought his scenes to life.

When Judge Crocker resigned from the Central Pacific board after a stroke in June 1869, Hart lost his connection with the company; he was replaced by Carleton Watkins, a boyhood friend of Central Pacific vice-president Collis P. Huntington. Hart sold some of his stereoview negatives to Watkins, who later published the CPRR stereoviews in the 1870s under his own name.

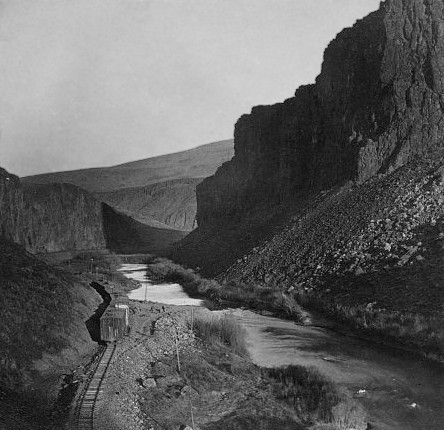
Alfred Hart's photograph#336 of Palisades (Ten Mile) Canyon and the Humboldt River, during construction of the Transcontinental Railroad.
