= Bram Goldsmith =

American real estate developer, banker and philanthropist

- Born: February 22, 1923; Chicago, Illinois, U.S.
- Died: February 28, 2016 (aged 93); Beverly Hills, California, U.S.
- Education: University of Illinois
- Occupations: Real estate developer, banker, philanthropist
- Employer: City National Bank
- Spouse: Elaine Maltz
- Children: Russell Goldsmith
- Parent(s): Max Goldsmith; Bertha
- Relatives: Benjamin N. Maltz (father-in-law)

Bram Goldsmith (February 22, 1923 – February 28, 2016) was an American real estate developer, banker and philanthropist. He served as the chief executive officer of City National Bank from 1975 to 1995, and as its chairman from 1975 to 2013. He became known as the "banker to the stars". He was a major philanthropist in Beverly Hills, California.

== Early life ==
Bram Goldsmith was born in 1923 in Chicago, Illinois, where he grew up. His father was Max Goldsmith and his mother, Bertha.

Goldsmith graduated from the University of Illinois, where he studied finance and business administration. After graduation, he served in the United States Army Air Corps for three and a half years, spending eighteen months in Burma.

== Career ==
Goldsmith served as president and chief executive officer of the Buckeye Realty and Management Corporation and the Buckeye Construction Company for twenty-five years. It was the largest privately owned real estate development company in California at the time. It built over thirty office towers in Beverly Hills, California. The loans for their construction were secured through the City National Bank.

Goldsmith was elected to the board of directors of City National Bank in 1964, when Alfred S. Hart was chairman and Benjamin N. Maltz (1901–1993), president. He served as its chief executive officer for twenty years, from 1975 to 1995, and as its chairman from 1975 to 2013. During his tenure, the bank's assets went from $600 million to $3.3 billion. He served as its chairman emeritus and Board until his death. He was sometimes referred to as the "banker to the stars," as the bank's clients under his included celebrities such as; Robert Redford, Paul Newman and Cher. In 1984, he was the highest paid banker in the United States with US$3.1 million, more than the salaries of the CEOs of Bank of America, Citibank and Chase Manhattan combined.

Goldsmith served on the board of directors of the Los Angeles Branch of the Federal Reserve Bank of San Francisco from 1981 to 1987. He also served on the board of directors of Wynn Resorts.

== Philanthropy ==
Goldsmith chaired the Los Angeles United Jewish Fund Campaign of 1965. He served as president of the Jewish Federation Council of Greater Los Angeles in 1969 and 1970. He also served as national chairman of the United Jewish Appeal from 1970 to 1974. Additionally, he served as Los Angeles Chairman and national Board member of the National Conference of Christians and Jews.

Goldsmith served as president of the Hillcrest Country Club from 1972 to 1975. He also served on the board of trustees of the Cedars-Sinai Medical Center from 1979 to 1999. From 1977 until his death in 2016, he served on the board of trustees of the Los Angeles Philharmonic. He was also chairman of the board of Region IV of the United Way and a member of its Central Board. Additionally, he served as the Founding Chairman of the Wallis Annenberg Center for the Performing Arts in Beverly Hills, California, until February 2013. Therein the 500-seat Goldsmith Theater is named in his honor.

== Personal life ==
Goldsmith was married to Elaine Maltz, a sculptor and the daughter of Benjamin N. Maltz, the President of City National Bank. They resided above Sunset Boulevard in Beverly Hills, California and had a secondary residence in Newport Beach, California. Their youngest son, Russell Goldsmith, serves as chairman and chief executive officer of City National Bank. Their other son Bruce Goldsmith is a published novelist, playwright and screenwriter.

== Death and legacy ==
Goldsmith died on February 28, 2016, at the age of 93. The city of Beverly Hills named Bram Goldsmith Way in his honor on November 7, 2018.
