= Joe Cosgriff =

Australian rules footballer

Personal information
- Full name: Joe Cosgriff
- Born: 25 May 1913
- Died: 19 August 2008 (aged 95)
- Original team: Port Melbourne CYMS (CYMSFA)
- Height: 169 cm (5 ft 7 in)
- Weight: 66 kg (146 lb)

Playing career^{1}
Years	Club	Games (Goals)
1932	South Melbourne	1 (0)
- ^{1} Playing statistics correct to the end of 1932.

Joe Cosgriff (25 May 1913 – 19 August 2008) was an Australian rules footballer who played with South Melbourne in the Victorian Football League (VFL).
