= Alfred S. Hart =

American businessman and banker

- Born: Alfred Harskovitz; 1904; Hungary
- Died: 1979 (aged 74–75)
- Occupations: Businessman, banker

Alfred S. Hart (a.k.a. Al Hart or Alfred Harskovitz) (1904–1979) was a Hungarian-born American businessman and banker. He was a wholesaler of beer in Chicago during Prohibition and later a distributor of wine and spirits in Los Angeles, California. He served as a director of Columbia Pictures. In 1954, he founded City National Bank in Beverly Hills.

== Early life ==
Alfred Harskovitz was born in a Jewish family in Hungary in 1904. He immigrated to the United States, settling in Chicago.

== Career ==
He started his career working for Al Capone as a wholesaler of beer during Prohibition, when it was an illegal substance. He then worked for Charles Gioe and Joseph Fusco as the manager of Gold Seal Liquors.

He moved to California in the 1920s and quickly established Glencoe Distilleries and the Pacific Brewing Company. A decade later, in the 1930s, he was the owner of Central Liquor Distributors, the San Angelo Wine and Spirit Corporation, and Alfred Hart Distilleries. He later became the majority owner of the Maier Brewing Company.

He was the owner of the Del Mar racetrack in San Diego. In 1948, he invested US$75,000 in the Flamingo Hotel in Las Vegas, Nevada. Additionally, he was a real estate investor in San Bernardino.

He served on the board of directors of Columbia Pictures. In 1954, he founded City National Bank in Beverly Hills. He hired Benjamin N. Maltz as the first chairman of the board.

== Death ==
Hart died in 1979.
