= Walter E. Cosgriff =

- Born: Walter Everett Cosgriff; July 4, 1914; Salt Lake City, Utah, U.S.
- Died: September 1961 (aged 47); Nevada, U.S.
- Occupation: Banker
- Spouse: Lula Enid Barr
- Children: 1 son, 2 daughters

Walter Everett Cosgriff (July 4, 1914 – September 1961) was an American banker. He served as the chairman of the Continental Bank and Trust Company and later president of the Bank of Las Vegas. He was the majority shareholder of the Salt Lake Bees, a minority league baseball team in Salt Lake City, Utah.

== Early life ==
Walter E. Cosgriff was born on July 4, 1914, in Salt Lake City, Utah.

His father, James E. Cosgriff, was a native of Burlington, Vermont, who moved to Rawlins, Wyoming, in 1890 to raise 100,000 sheep. He later started a bank in Rawlins, and acquired the Commercial National Bank of Salt Lake City in 1905. When it merged with the National Bank of the Republic in 1920, it became known as the Continental Bank and Trust Company, of whose Cosgriff was the president until January 1938 and chairman until his death in September 1938. The J.E. Cosgriff Memorial Catholic School in Salt Lake City was named in his honor.

His mother was Mildred Dobson.

== Business career ==
Cosgriff followed in his father's footsteps as a banker. Shortly after his father's death in October 1938, he was appointed as a board member and first vice president of the First National Bank of Rawlins, Wyoming. He later served as the chairman of the Bank and Trust Company. By 1954, he owned banks in "Salt Lake City, Richfield and Bountiful, Utah; Colorado Springs, Meeker and Rifle, Colorado; Boise, Richfield, Whitney, New Plymouth, Caldwell, Wilder, Idaho Falls, Marsing, Homedale and Bruneau, Idaho; Beverly, Kansas; Las Vegas, Nevada; Long Beach, California, and Evanston, Wyoming". It had US$200 million of assets under management.

Cosgriff subsequently served as the president of the Bank of Las Vegas, while Nate Mack served as its chairman.

Cosgriff was appointed to the board of directors of the Reconstruction Finance Corporation by President Harry S. Truman in 1950. He served on the board from October 1950 to May 4, 1951. However, he resigned because of a disagreement with the Comptroller of the Currency, Preston Delano.

Additionally, Cosgriff was the majority shareholder of the Salt Lake Bees, a minority league baseball team in Salt Lake City, Utah.

== Philanthropy ==
Cosgriff served on the board of regents of the University of Utah. He also served on the board of trustees of the Holy Cross Hospital in Salt Lake City. Additionally, he served as the vice president of the western section of the Young Presidents' Organization.

== Personal life ==
Cosgriff married Lula Enid Barr on June 7, 1937, in Salt Lake City, Utah. They had a son, Anthony, and two daughters Lyn (who married Harold Isbell), and Trix (who married Rainer Dahl).

Barr was a philanthropist in Salt Lake City, where she co-founded Ballet West and supported Catholic charities; Pope John Paul II made her a Lady of the Order of the Holy Sepulchre. Meanwhile, Cosgriff competed in golf championships.

Like his wife, Cosgriff was a Roman Catholic. He was a member of the Benevolent and Protective Order of Elks, the Alta Club, the University Club of Salt Lake City, the Salt Lake Country Club, the Fort Douglas Golf Club and the Ambassador Athletic Club.

== Death and legacy ==
Cosgriff died in a car accident in Nevada in September 1961. His funeral was held at the Cathedral of the Madeleine in Salt Lake City. Shortly after his death, E. Parry Thomas succeeded Cosgriff as the president of the Bank of Las Vegas.

Cosgriff's widow died in 1997.

The Walter E. Cosgriff Memorial Endowed Scholarship Fund for Ballet at the University of Utah was endowed in his donor in 1980.
