= City National Bank (California) =

Bank based in California, United States

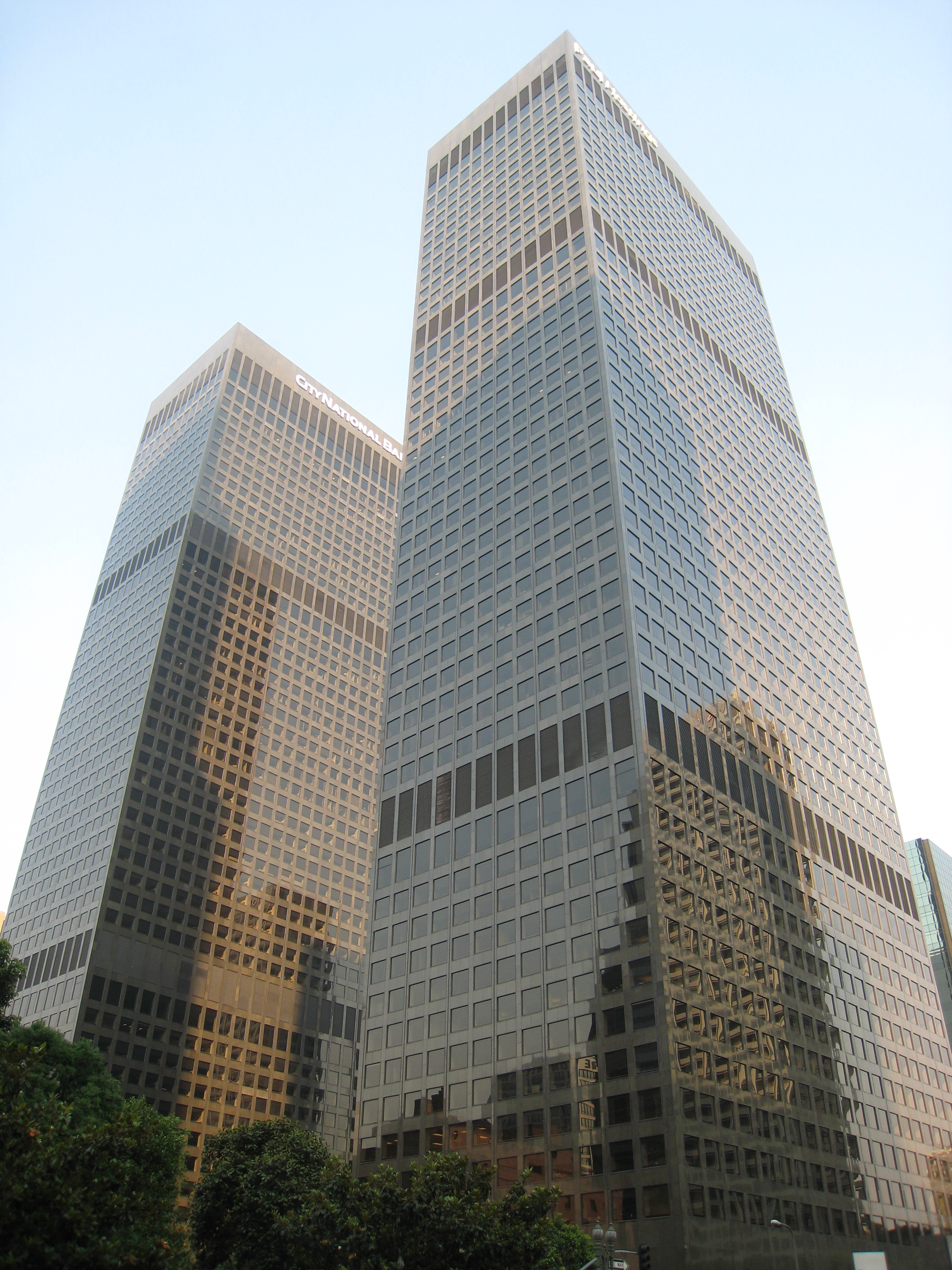
- Los Angeles Headquarters
- Formerly: City National Bank of Beverly Hills (1954-1964)
- Type: Subsidiary
- Founded: 1954; 72 years ago, in Beverly Hills, California
- Founder: Alfred S. Hart
- Headquarters: City National Plaza; Los Angeles, California
- Key people: Benjamin N. Maltz (first chairman); Russell Goldsmith (former chairman); Howard Hammond (CEO); Bram Goldsmith (former chairman)
- Total assets: $91.5 billion
- Parent: Royal Bank of Canada
- Website: cnb.com

City National Bank (CNB) is a bank headquartered at City National Plaza in Los Angeles, California. CNB was founded in 1957, and since 2015 is a subsidiary of the Toronto-based Royal Bank of Canada. It is the 30th largest bank in the United States as of December 31, 2023.

CNB has been dubbed the "Bank to the Stars" due to its extensive relationships with numerous Hollywood entertainment industry clients, and deals with many exclusive and premier clients from various media, including television, film, theater and the arts.

== Management ==
The bank had total assets of $91 billion (as of June 1, 2022). It offers a full complement of banking, trust and investment services through 75 offices, including 19 full-service regional centers, in Southern California, the San Francisco Bay Area, Nevada, New York City, Minneapolis, Nashville, Washington, DC and Atlanta. After the closure or merger of many Los Angeles banks, it has become the largest bank headquartered in the Greater Los Angeles Area. It also acts as a processing bank, providing back office services such as checking account processing and check clearance services for smaller local banks that do not do their own processing. In addition, the company manages $71.7 billion in client investment assets.

City National is a national bank, regulated by the Office of the Comptroller of the Currency of the United States Department of the Treasury. It has been a wholly owned subsidiary of the Royal Bank of Canada since 2015.

== History ==
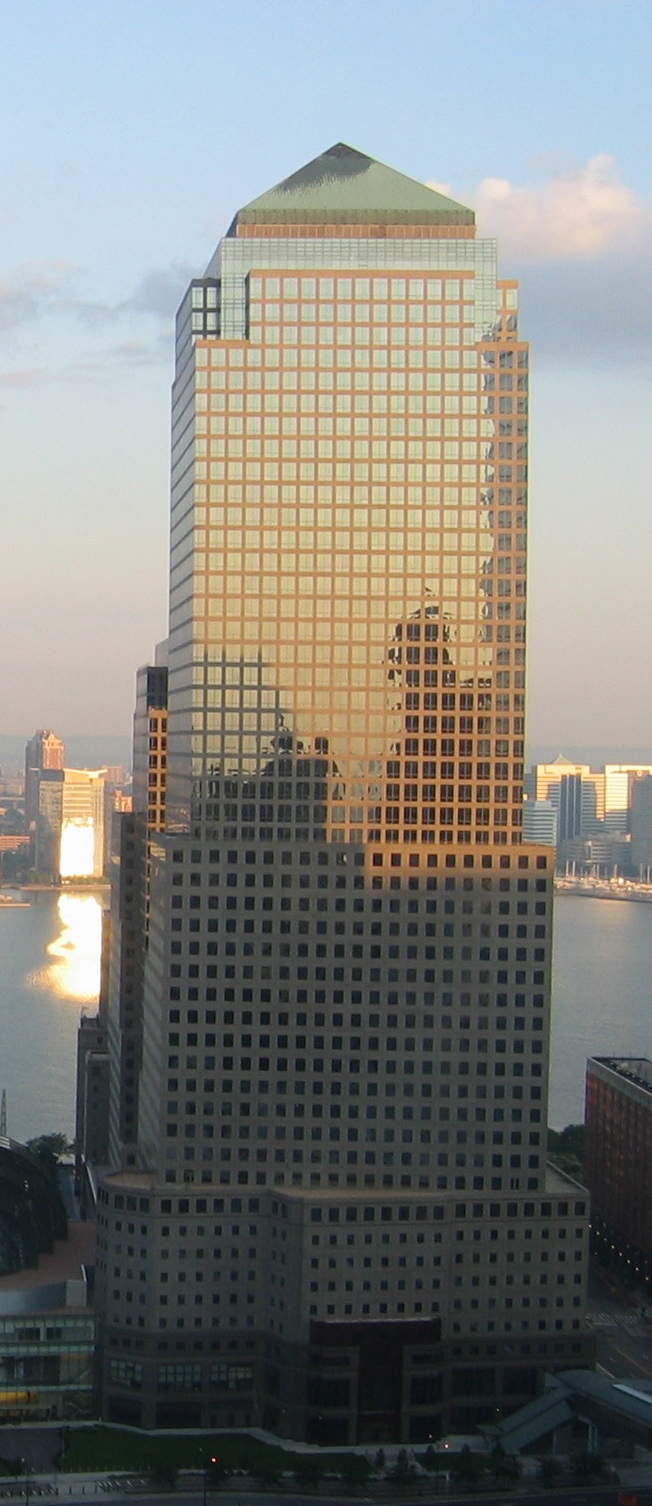
New York City Wealth Management Office

Alfred S. Hart founded City National Bank of Beverly Hills in 1954. He hired Benjamin N. Maltz as the first chairman of the board. Its offices were in Beverly Hills at 400 North Roxbury Drive until 2004 when its headquarters were relocated to Arco Plaza (later City National Plaza) in Los Angeles.

In 1963, when Frank Sinatra's son was kidnapped, the bank put up the $240,000 demanded as ransom money. In February 1964, the bank dropped the "of Beverly Hills" suffix from its name, becoming just City National Bank. In 1970, its stock began trading over the counter.

In the 1990s, City National acquired seven banks: First Los Angeles Bank (1995), Ventura County National Bank (1997), Frontier Bank (1997), Riverside National Bank (1997), Harbor Bank (1998), North American Trust Company (1998), and American Pacific State Bank (1999). In 2000, the bank expanded into Northern California in with the purchase of The Pacific Bank, followed by the acquisition of the Oakland-based Civic BanCorp in 2002. It had also acquired The Pacific Bank in 2000 as well as Reed, Conner & Birdwell and the People's Bank of California in 2001.

In 2002, City National opened an office in New York City to serve its California-based clientele who do business on both coasts, as well as prospective clients in Manhattan. In that decade, it continued to acquire more banks and investment advisory firms: Convergent Capital Management, LLC (2003), Business Bank of Nevada (2006), Convergent Wealth Advisors (2007), Lee Munder Capital Group (2009), Imperial Capital Bank (2009).

City National then acquired two more banks in 2010: 1st Pacific Bank and Sun West Bank. In mid-2011, the bank opened a branch in Nashville, Tennessee. In 2012, it acquired Rochdale Investment Management and First American Equipment Finance.

In January 2015, City National announced a "definitive agreement" to be acquired by the Royal Bank of Canada.

In April 2017, the bank opened its first full-service branch at RBC Plaza in Minneapolis, in conjunction with RBC Wealth Management.

In October 2018, City National announced that Kelly Coffey would become its first female CEO from February 2019 becoming only the 4th CEO in the bank's history.

In January 2023, the bank agreed to pay $31,000,000 to resolve allegations of redlining from 2017 to at least 2020, brought by the United States Department of Justice.

In September 2024, City National opened a new branch in Whittier, California, in addition to expanding its mortgage grant program and investment in the entertainment industry.

In January 2025, the bank donated $3 million to fire relief efforts after the 2025 Southern California wildfires, supporting various nonprofit organizations and other groups. The donation was made in partnership with the Royal Bank of Canada, with RBC contributing $250,000 to the American Red Cross Disaster Responder Program.

== Sponsorships ==
The most notable of City National Bank's sponsorships is that of the Vegas Golden Knights in the National Hockey League which includes the naming rights to the team headquarters and practice facility City National Arena. In 2025, City National Bank became the sleeve sponsor of Major League Soccer team LA Galaxy alongside the parent company RBC.

City National is also the main sponsor of the Tony Awards.
