= California State Legislature, 2027–2028 session =

2027–2028 session of the California State Legislature
←	2025–2026
- The Seal of California

Overview
- Legislative body: California State Legislature
- Jurisdiction: California
- Term: December 7, 2026 – present

Senate
- Members: 40
- President of the Senate: Eleni Kounalakis (D); Jan. 7, 2019 – present
- Party control: Democratic

Assembly
- Members: 80
- Party control: Democratic

The 2027–2028 session is the next session of the California State Legislature, composed of 40 members of the State Senate and 80 members of the State Assembly. The session will first convene in Sacramento, California, on December 7, 2026, and will end on November 30, 2028, corresponding to the first two years of governor-elect Xavier Becerra's term of office.

== Major events ==
=== Vacancies and special elections ===
- By January 3, 2027: Democratic senator Scott Wiener (11th–San Francisco) will resign to assume office in the United States House of Representatives representing California's 11th congressional district.

== State Senate ==
↓
32	1	7
Democratic	TBD	Rep

=== Officers ===
Position	Name	Party	District
Lieutenant Governor	Eleni Kounalakis	Democratic	
President pro tempore		Democratic	
Majority leader	Angelique Ashby	Democratic	8th-Sacramento
Democratic Caucus Chair	Caroline Menjivar	Democratic	20th–Los Angeles
Minority leader		Republican	
Secretary	Erika Contreras		
Sergeant-at-Arms	Katrina Rodriguez		
Chaplain	Sister Michelle Gorman, RSM		

The Secretary, the Sergeant-at-Arms, and the chaplain are not members of the Legislature.

=== Members ===
District	Name	Party	Residence	Term-limited?	Notes
1	Megan Dahle	Republican	Bieber	Yes	
2	Damon Connolly	Democratic	San Rafael		
3	Christopher Cabaldon	Democratic	West Sacramento		
4	Alexandra Duarte	Republican	Modesto		
5	Jerry McNerney	Democratic	Stockton		
6					
7	Jesse Arreguín	Democratic	Berkeley		
8	Angelique Ashby	Democratic	Sacramento		Majority leader
9	Tim Grayson	Democratic	Concord	Yes	
10	Scott Sakakihara	Democratic	Union City		
11	Scott Wiener	Democratic	San Francisco	Yes	
12	Nathan Magsig	Republican	Clovis		
13	Josh Becker	Democratic	Menlo Park		
14	Esmeralda Soria	Democratic	Fresno		
15	Dave Cortese	Democratic	San Jose		
16	Melissa Hurtado	Democratic	Bakersfield		
17	John Laird	Democratic	Santa Cruz	Yes	
18	Steve Padilla	Democratic	Chula Vista		
19	Rosilicie Ochoa Bogh	Republican	Yucaipa		
20	Caroline Menjivar	Democratic	Los Angeles		
21	Monique Limón	Democratic	Santa Barbara	Yes	President pro tempore since November 17, 2025
22	Susan Rubio	Democratic	Baldwin Park		
23	Suzette Martinez Valladares	Republican	Santa Clarita		
24	Brian Goldsmith	Democratic	Beverly Hills		
25	Sasha Renée Pérez	Democratic	Alhambra		
26	Sara Hernandez	Democratic	Los Angeles		
27	Henry Stern	Democratic	Malibu	Yes	
28	Lola Smallwood-Cuevas	Democratic	Los Angeles		
29	Eloise Reyes	Democratic	Colton	Yes	
30	Bob Archuleta	Democratic	Pico Rivera		
31	Sabrina Cervantes	Democratic	Corona	Yes	
32	Kelly Seyarto	Republican	Murrieta		
33	Lena Gonzalez	Democratic	Long Beach		
34	Avelino Valencia	Democratic	Santa Ana		
35	Laura Richardson	Democratic	Long Beach		
36	Chris Duncan	Democratic	San Clemente		
37	Steven Choi	Republican	Irvine	Yes	
38	Catherine Blakespear	Democratic	Encinitas		
39	Akilah Weber	Democratic	San Diego		
40	Mara Elliott	Democratic	San Diego		

== State Assembly ==
↓
67	1	12
Democratic	TBD	Rep

=== Officers ===
Position	Name	Party	District
Speaker		Democratic	
Speaker pro tempore	Josh Lowenthal	Democratic	69th–Long Beach
Assistant speaker pro tempore	Celeste Rodriguez	Democratic	43rd-San Fernando
Majority leader	Cecilia Aguiar-Curry	Democratic	4th–Winters
Assistant majority leader	Robert Garcia	Democratic	50th-Rancho Cucamonga
Assistant majority leader for policy and research	LaShae Sharp-Collins	Democratic	79th–San Diego
Majority whip	Mark Gonzalez	Democratic	54th–Los Angeles
Assistant majority whip	Michelle Rodriguez	Democratic	53rd–Pomona
Assistant majority whip	Jessica Caloza	Democratic	52nd–Los Angeles
Democratic caucus chair	Rick Zbur	Democratic	51st–Los Angeles
Republican leader		Republican	
Republican chief whip	David Tangipa	Republican	8th–Fresno
Republican floor leader		Republican	
Republican caucus chair	Natasha Johnson	Republican	63rd–Lake Elsinore
Republican deputy floor leader	Joe Patterson	Republican	5th–Rocklin
Chief Clerk	Sue Parker		
Chief Sergeant-at-Arms	Cheryl Craft		
Chaplain	Revs. Bob Oshita and Patti Oshita		

=== Members ===
District	Name	Party	Residence	Term-limited?	Notes
1	Heather Hadwick	Republican	Alturas		
2	Chris Rogers	Democratic	Santa Rosa		
3	Dom Belza	Republican	Marysville		
4	Cecilia Aguiar-Curry	Democratic	Winters	Yes	Majority leader
5	Joe Patterson	Republican	Rocklin		
6	Maggy Krell	Democratic	Sacramento		
7	Amy Slavensky	Democratic	Fair Oaks		
8	David Tangipa	Republican	Fresno		
9	Heath Flora	Republican	Ripon	Yes	
10	Stephanie Nguyen	Democratic	Elk Grove		
11	Lori Wilson	Democratic	Suisun City		
12	Jackie Elward	Democratic	Rohnert Park		
13	Rhodesia Ransom	Democratic	Tracy		
14	Buffy Wicks	Democratic	Oakland		
15	Anamarie Avila Farias	Democratic	Martinez		
16	Rebecca Bauer-Kahan	Democratic	Orinda		
17	Matt Haney	Democratic	San Francisco		
18	Mia Bonta	Democratic	Alameda		
19	Catherine Stefani	Democratic	San Francisco		
20	Liz Ortega	Democratic	San Leandro		
21	Diane Papan	Democratic	San Mateo		
22	Juan Alanis	Republican	Modesto		
23	Marc Berman	Democratic	Menlo Park	Yes	
24	Alex Lee	Democratic	San Jose		
25	Ash Kalra	Democratic	San Jose	Yes	
26	Patrick Ahrens	Democratic	San Jose		
27	Brian Pacheco	Democratic	Kerman		
28	Gail Pellerin	Democratic	Santa Cruz		
29	Robert A. Rivas	Democratic	Hollister		Speaker of the Assembly
30	Dawn Addis	Democratic	Morro Bay		
31	Annalisa Perea	Democratic	Fresno		
32	David Couch	Republican	Bakersfield		
33	Hipolito Cerros	Democratic	Lindsay		
34	Charles Hughes	Republican	Leona Valley		
35	Andrae Gonzales	Democratic	Bakersfield		
36	Ida Obeso-Martinez	Republican	Imperial		
37	Gregg Hart	Democratic	Santa Barbara		
38	Steve Bennett	Democratic	Ventura		
39	Juan Carrillo	Democratic	Palmdale		
40	Pilar Schiavo	Democratic	Chatsworth		
41	John Harabedian	Democratic	Sierra Madre		
42	Deborah Klein Lopez	Democratic	Agoura Hills		
43	Celeste Rodriguez	Democratic	San Fernando		
44	Nick Schultz	Democratic	Burbank		
45	James Ramos	Democratic	Highland		
46	Jesse Gabriel	Democratic	Encino		
47	Leila Namvar	Republican	La Quinta		
48	Blanca Rubio	Democratic	Baldwin Park	Yes	
49	Mike Fong	Democratic	Alhambra		
50	Robert Garcia	Democratic	Rancho Cucamonga		
51	Rick Zbur	Democratic	Los Angeles		
52	Jessica Caloza	Democratic	Los Angeles		
53	Michelle Rodriguez	Democratic	Pomona		
54	Mark Gonzalez	Democratic	Los Angeles		Majority whip
55	Isaac Bryan	Democratic	Jefferson Park		
56	Lisa Calderon	Democratic	Whittier		
57	Sade Elhawary	Democratic	Los Angeles		
58	Clarissa Cervantes	Democratic	Riverside		
59	Phillip Chen	Republican	Yorba Linda	Yes	
60	Corey Jackson	Democratic	Perris		
61	Tina McKinnor	Democratic	Hawthorne		
62	Jose Solache	Democratic	Lynwood		
63	Natasha Johnson	Republican	Lake Elsinore		
64	Blanca Pacheco	Democratic	Downey		
65	Ayanna Davis	Democratic	Compton		
66	Paul Seo	Democratic	Rancho Palos Verdes		
67	Mark Pulido	Democratic	Cerritos		
68	Jessie Lopez	Democratic	Santa Ana		
69	Josh Lowenthal	Democratic	Long Beach		
70	Paula Swift	Democratic	Seal Beach		
71	Kate Sanchez	Republican	Trabuco Canyon		
72					
73	Cottie Petrie-Norris	Democratic	Irvine		
74	Sergio Farias	Democratic	San Juan Capistrano		
75	Carl DeMaio	Republican	Valley Center		
76	Darshana Patel	Democratic	San Diego		
77	Tasha Boerner	Democratic	Encinitas		
78	Chris Ward	Democratic	San Diego		
79	LaShae Sharp-Collins	Democratic	San Diego		
80	David Alvarez	Democratic	San Diego		

== See also ==
- List of California state legislatures
