= 2028 California State Assembly election =

- November 7, 2028

All 80 seats in the California State Assembly 41 seats needed for a majority
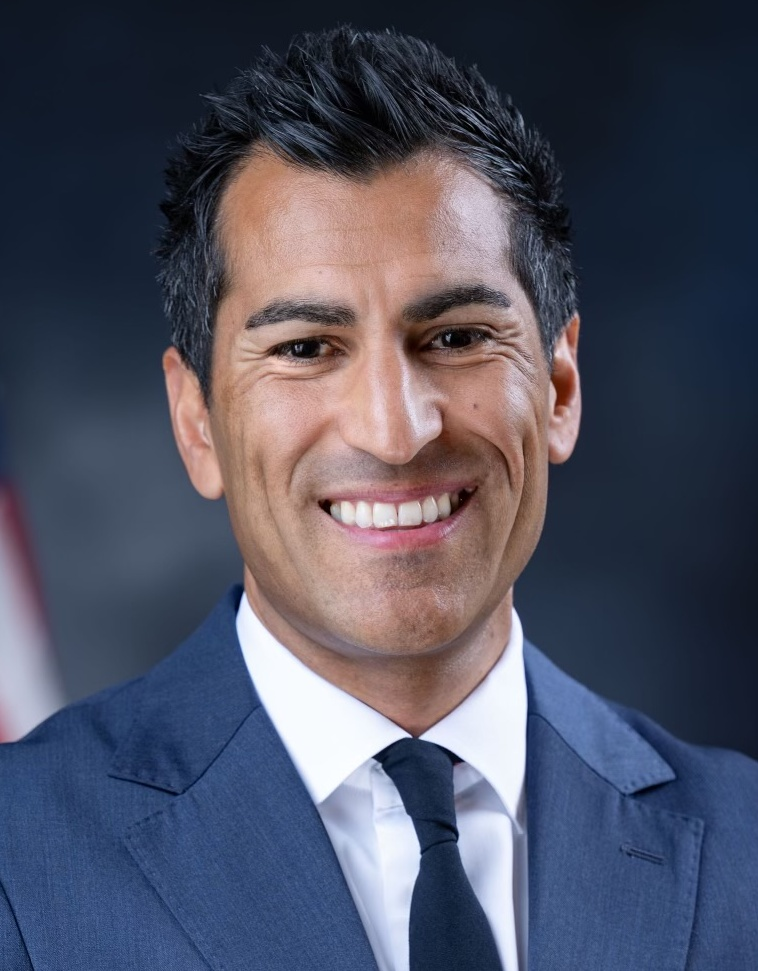
| | Majority party | Minority party |
|---|---|---|
| Leader | Robert Rivas | TBD |
| Party | Democratic | Republican |
| Leader since | June 30, 2023 | August 3, 2026 |
| Leader's seat | 29th–Hollister |
| Last election | 68 seats, ??% | 12 seats, ??% |
| Seats before | 68 | 12 |
Speaker before election
Robert Rivas
Democratic
Elected Speaker
TBD

The 2028 California State Assembly election will be held on Tuesday, November 7, 2028. The primary election will be held on March 7, 2028. All of the seats of the California State Assembly will be elected as part of the 2028 California elections.

== Outgoing incumbents ==
=== Term-limited or running for other office ===
==== Democrats ====
- 4th: Cecilia Aguiar-Curry is term limited
- 23rd: Marc Berman is term limited
- 25th: Ash Kalra is term limited
- 48th: Blanca Rubio is term limited

==== Republicans ====
- 9th: Heath Flora is term limited
- 59th: Phillip Chen is term limited

== Summary by district ==
† - Incumbent not seeking re-election

| District | 2024 Pres. | Incumbent | Party | Elected Member | Party |
|---|---|---|---|---|---|
| 1st | R+16.1 | Heather Hadwick | Rep | | |
| 2nd | D+34.8 | Chris Rogers | Dem | | |
| 3rd | R+19.2 | Dom Belza | Rep | | |
| 4th | D+30.0 | Cecilia Aguiar-Curry† | Dem | | |
| 5th | R+10.7 | Joe Patterson | Rep | | |
| 6th | D+34.0 | Maggy Krell | Dem | | |
| 7th | D+4.5 | Amy Slavensky | Dem | | |
| 8th | R+18.3 | David Tangipa | Rep | | |
| 9th | R+23.3 | Heath Flora† | Rep | | |
| 10th | D+27.9 | Stephanie Nguyen | Dem | | |
| 11th | D+19.6 | Lori Wilson | Dem | | |
| 12th | D+55.6 | Jackie Elward | Dem | | |
| 13th | D+13.4 | Rhodesia Ransom | Dem | | |
| 14th | D+71.5 | Buffy Wicks | Dem | | |
| 15th | D+31.8 | Anamarie Avila Farias | Dem | | |
| 16th | D+36.4 | Rebecca Bauer-Kahan | Dem | | |
| 17th | D+67.3 | Matt Haney | Dem | | |
| 18th | D+72.1 | Mia Bonta | Dem | | |
| 19th | D+57.4 | Catherine Stefani | Dem | | |
| 20th | D+40.3 | Liz Ortega | Dem | | |
| 21st | D+50.6 | Diane Papan | Dem | | |
| 22nd | R+7.5 | Juan Alanis | Rep | | |
| 23rd | D+54.5 | Marc Berman† | Dem | | |
| 24th | D+30.6 | Alex Lee | Dem | | |
| 25th | D+32.4 | Ash Kalra† | Dem | | |
| 26th | D+45.3 | Patrick Ahrens | Dem | | |
| 27th | R+2.6 | Brian Pacheco | Dem | | |
| 28th | D+40.3 | Gail Pellerin | Dem | | |
| 29th | D+44.0 | Robert Rivas | Dem | | |
| 30th | D+27.2 | Dawn Addis | Dem | | |
| 31st | D+13.1 | Annalisa Perea | Dem | | |
| 32nd | R+33.2 | David Couch | Rep | | |
| 33rd | R+18.5 | Hipolito Cerros | Dem | | |
| 34th | R+19.8 | Charles Hughes | Rep | | |
| 35th | D+0.4 | Andrae Gonzales | Dem | | |
| 36th | R+1.2 | Ida Obeso-Martinez | Dem | | |
| 37th | D+24.0 | Gregg Hart | Dem | | |
| 38th | D+23.9 | Steve Bennett | Dem | | |
| 39th | D+9.2 | Juan Carrillo | Dem | | |
| 40th | D+8.4 | Pilar Schiavo | Dem | | |
| 41st | D+21.4 | John Harabedian | Dem | | |
| 42nd | D+14.2 | Deborah Klein Lopez | Dem | | |
| 43rd | D+29.7 | Celeste Rodriguez | Dem | | |
| 44th | D+32.9 | Nick Schultz | Dem | | |
| 45th | D+12.2 | James Ramos | Dem | | |
| 46th | D+25.9 | Jesse Gabriel | Dem | | |
| 47th | D+4.1 | Leila Namvar | Dem | | |
| 48th | D+16.6 | Blanca Rubio† | Dem | | |
| 49th | D+23.7 | Mike Fong | Dem | | |
| 50th | D+9.7 | Robert Garcia | Dem | | |
| 51st | D+52.0 | Rick Zbur | Dem | | |
| 52nd | D+53.6 | Jessica Caloza | Dem | | |
| 53rd | D+12.0 | Michelle Rodriguez | Dem | | |
| 54th | D+43.9 | Mark Gonzalez | Dem | | |
| 55th | D+62.2 | Isaac Bryan | Dem | | |
| 56th | D+17.8 | Lisa Calderon | Dem | | |
| 57th | D+52.6 | Sade Elhawary | Dem | | |
| 58th | D+4.0 | Clarissa Cervantes | Dem | | |
| 59th | R+6.4 | Phillip Chen† | Rep | | |
| 60th | D+8.4 | Corey Jackson | Dem | | |
| 61st | D+56.9 | Tina McKinnor | Dem | | |
| 62nd | D+28.8 | Jose Solache | Dem | | |
| 63rd | R+12.8 | Natasha Johnson | Rep | | |
| 64th | D+16.2 | Blanca Pacheco | Dem | | |
| 65th | D+43.5 | Ayanna Davis | Dem | | |
| 66th | D+23.3 | Paul Seo | Dem | | |
| 67th | D+10.4 | Mark Pulido | Dem | | |
| 68th | D+22.3 | Jessie Lopez | Dem | | |
| 69th | D+38.2 | Josh Lowenthal | Dem | | |
| 70th | R+3.1 | Paula Swift | Dem | | |
| 71st | R+11.0 | Kate Sanchez | Rep | | |
| 72nd | R+2.7 | Chris Kluwe | Dem | | |
| 73rd | D+16.6 | Cottie Petrie-Norris | Dem | | |
| 74th | D+1.8 | Sergio Farias | Dem | | |
| 75th | R+13.9 | Carl DeMaio | Rep | | |
| 76th | D+12.6 | Darshana Patel | Dem | | |
| 77th | D+29.3 | Tasha Boerner | Dem | | |
| 78th | D+36.3 | Chris Ward | Dem | | |
| 79th | D+22.5 | LaShae Sharp-Collins | Dem | | |
| 80th | D+17.1 | David Alvarez | Dem | | |

== District 70 ==
2028 California's 70th State Assembly district election
State assemblymember before election
Paula Swift
Democratic
State assemblymember after election
TBD

Republican Tri Ta represented the district 2022 thru 2026 when he was ousted by Paula Swift. Ta is seeking to return to the State Assembly for a third term in office.

=== Candidates ===
==== Declared ====
- Tri Ta (Republican), Assemblymember for the district (2022-2026)

=== Endorsements ===
Paula Swift (D)
Tri Ta (R)

=== Results ===
2028 California's 70th State Assembly district election
Primary election
| Party | Candidate | Votes | % |
|---|---|---|---|
| Total votes | | | |
General election
| Total votes | | | |
| | gain from | | |
