= California Democratic Party =

California affiliate of the Democratic Party

- Chairperson: Rusty Hicks
- Governor: Gavin Newsom
- Lieutenant Governor: Eleni Kounalakis
- Senate President pro tempore: Mike McGuire
- Assembly Speaker: Robert Rivas
- Headquarters: 1830 9th Street, Sacramento, California 95811
- Membership (Oct 4, 2026): ▲10,389,050
- Ideology: Liberalism
- National affiliation: Democratic Party
- Colors: Blue
- Seats in the United States Senate: 2 / 2
- Seats in the United States House of Representatives: 43 / 52
- Statewide Executive Offices: 8 / 8
- Seats in the California State Senate: 30 / 40
- Seats in the California State Assembly: 60 / 80

Election symbol

Website
- cadem.org

The California Democratic Party, also known as the Democratic Party of California, is the affiliate of the Democratic Party in the state of California. It is headquartered in Sacramento, California.

With 44.76% of the state's registered voters as of October 4, 2026, the Democratic Party has the highest number of registrants of any political party in California.

== History ==
=== 1850s ===
Since the beginning of the 1850s, issues regarding slavery had effectively split the California Democratic Party. By the 1853 general election campaign, large majorities of pro-slavery Democrats from Southern California, calling themselves the Chivalry (later branded as Lecompton Democrats), threatened to divide the state in half, should the state not accept slavery. John Bigler, along with former state senator and lieutenant governor David C. Broderick from the previous McDougall Administration, formed the Free Soil Democratic faction, modeled after the federal Free Soil Party that argued against the spread of slavery.

The Democrats effectively split into two camps, with both the Chivalry and Free Soilers nominating their own candidates for the 1853 election. By 1857, the party had split into the Lecompton and Anti-Lecompton factions. Lecompton members supported the Kansas Lecompton Constitution, a document explicitly allowing slavery into the territory, while Anti-Lecompton faction members were in opposition to slavery's expansion. The violence between supporting and opposition forces led to the period known as Bleeding Kansas. Splits in the Democratic Party, as well as the power vacuum created by the collapse of the Whig Party, helped facilitate the rise of the American Party both in state and federal politics. In particular, state voters voted Know-Nothings into the California State Legislature, and elected J. Neely Johnson as governor in the 1855 general elections.

During the 1859 general elections, Lecompton Democrats voted for Milton Latham, who had briefly lived in the American South, as their nominee for governor. Anti-Lecomptons in turn selected John Currey as their nominee. The infant Republican Party, running in its first gubernatorial election, selected businessman Leland Stanford as its nominee. To make matters more complicated, during the campaign, Senator David C. Broderick, an Anti-Lecompton Democrat, was killed in a duel by slavery supporter and former state Supreme Court Justice David Terry on September 13.

=== Late 19th and early 20th centuries ===
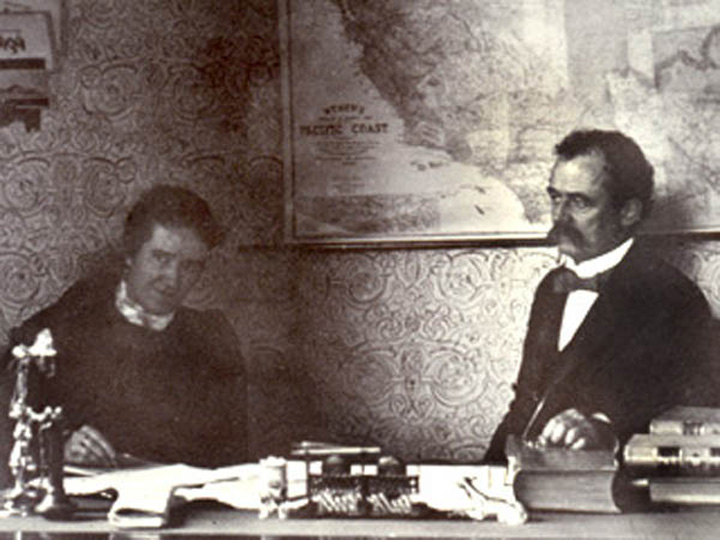
Governor James Budd in his office

Until the early 1880s, the Republican Party held the state through the power and influence of railroad men. The Democratic Party responded by taking an anti-corporate, anti freedom of attainment position. In 1894, Democrat James Budd was elected to the governorship, and the Democratic Party attempted to make good on their promises to reform the booming railroad industry. The party began working closely with the state's railroad commission to create fair rates for passengers and to eliminate monopolies the railroad companies held over the state. The main effort focused on making railroads public avenues of transportation similar to streets and roads. This measure passed and was a great victory for the Democrats, but the honeymoon would not last. Budd was to be the last Democratic governor for thirty years. The struggle between the anti-monopolists and the railroad companies was, however, a key and defining issue for the Democratic Party for some time.

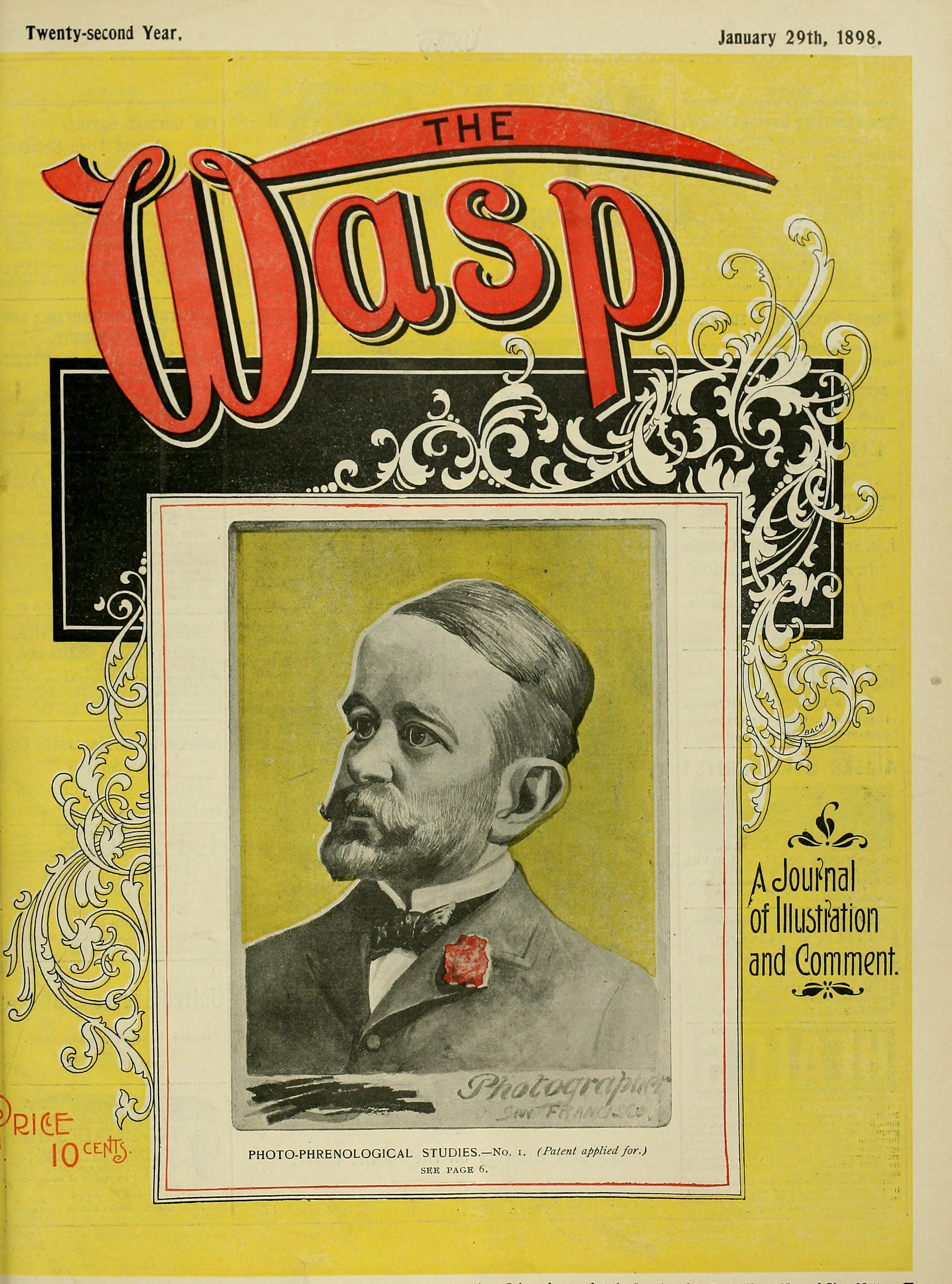
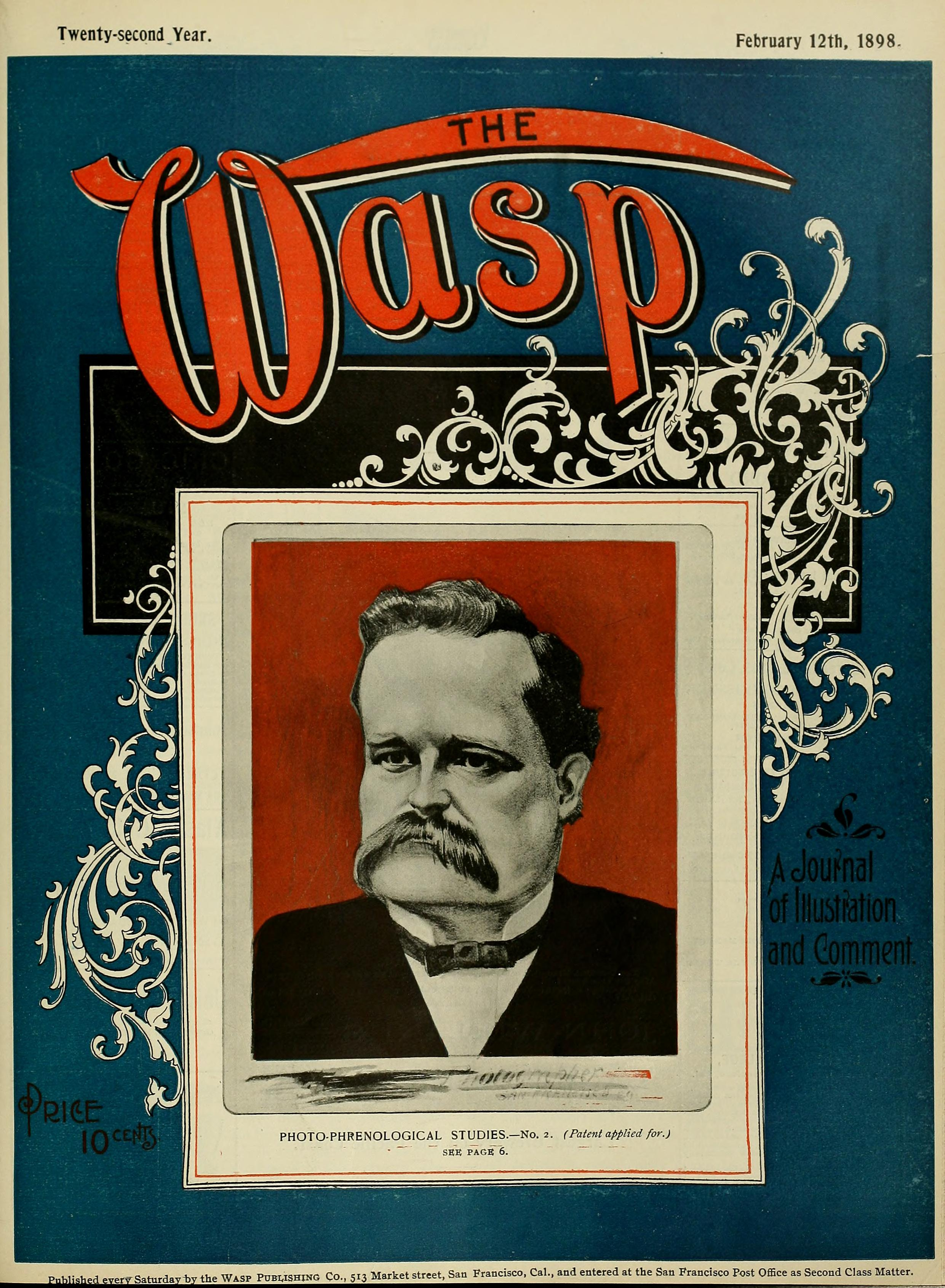
"Photo-Phrenological Studies," caricatures of prominent California Democrats James D. Phelan (left) and James G. Maguire (right) published in The Wasp, 1898

Despite their relative lack of power during this period, the Democrats in California were still active in pursuing reform. The party supported fairer railroad policies and crusaded for tariff reform. The party also supported the large scale railroad strikes that sprung up statewide. The corruption of the time in both the railroad companies and the government led to a change in political dynamic. The people of the state moved away from both of the main parties and the Progressive Movement began.

While the Progressives were successful in creating positive reform and chasing out corruption, the movement drained away many of the Democratic Party's members. As their movement ended, the Republicans won the governorship, but the Democratic Party had a distinct voter advantage.

In 1932, Franklin D. Roosevelt was elected president, and the Power balance between the Republicans and the Democrats in California equalized. However, as Roosevelt's New Deal policies began to raise the nation out of the depression, Democratic strength mounted. Culbert Olson was elected to the governorship, but his term was rocky, and both parties organized against him. Shortly thereafter, Earl Warren and the Republicans regained power again.

The California Democratic Party needed a new strategy to regain power in the state. A strategy of re-organization and popular mobilization emerged and resulted in the creation of the California Democratic Council. The CDC, as it became known, was a way for members of the party from all levels of government to come together, and, as such, the party became more unified. A new network of politically minded civilians and elected officials emerged, and the party was stronger for it. Despite the fact that the council struggled in the Cold War era, due to Republican strength and issues such as the Vietnam War, it still exists today.

=== 1990s ===
By 1992, California was hurting more than most states from a national recession which had started in 1990, causing incumbent Republican president George H. W. Bush's approval rating to tank within the state, giving an opening for the Democratic party to break through and eventually become the largest party. Starting with the double digit victory of Bill Clinton, this became the first time a Democrat had carried the state of California since 1964. Afterwards, a consolidation of the Latino and Asian vote would strengthen the Democratic party's hold in California, when these groups had previously been considered core Republican supporters within the state.

The California Democratic Party began re-organizing in 1991, and in 1992, the party won the greatest victories in the history of California. President Clinton won California's 54 electoral votes, and two women, Dianne Feinstein and Barbara Boxer, were elected as U.S. senators.

Even though redistricting (re-apportionment) was executed by a Republican State Supreme Court, California Democrats in November 1992 had increased their margin at all levels—congressional, state assembly and in the state senate.

In 1994, California Democrats suffered a setback by losing the governor's race for the fourth time in a row, and the Democrats became a minority in the State Assembly. However, despite $29 million spent by Republican U.S. Senate candidate Michael Huffington, Democratic incumbent U.S. Senator Dianne Feinstein won re-election.

The 1996 elections proved to be a dramatic turnaround from the results of 1994, as President Bill Clinton won California's 54 electoral votes for a second consecutive time. Three Republican congressmen were also defeated, including Bob Dornan in the conservative stronghold of Orange County. In addition, California Democrats also regained the majority in the State Assembly, while adding to their majority in the state senate.

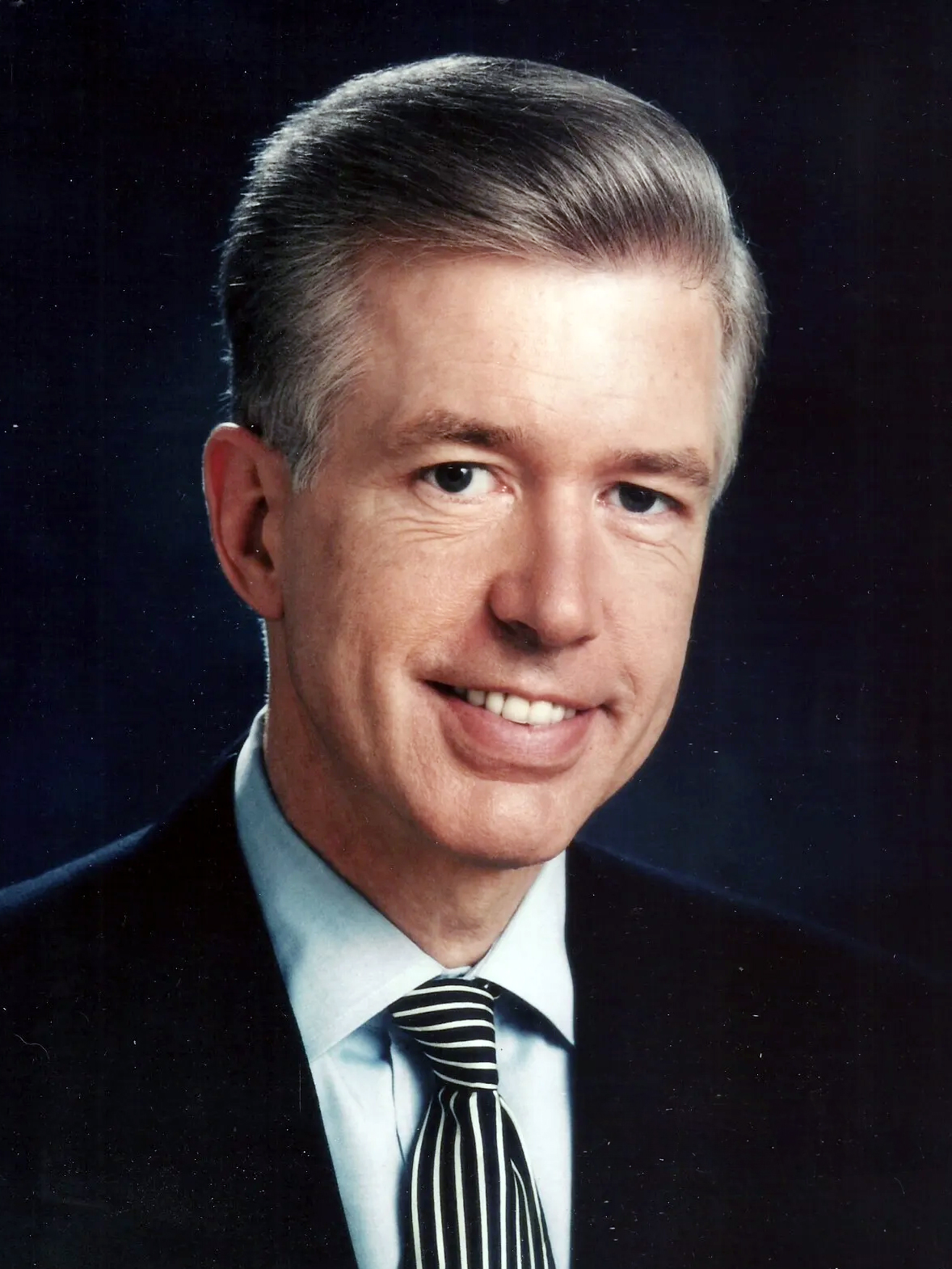
Davis's official biography profile as governor

The California Democrats had a banner year in 1998. An overwhelming majority of Californians elected Gray Davis, the first Democratic governor in 16 years, and re-elected U.S. Senator Barbara Boxer. Six of eight candidates for statewide constitutional offices won, including Lieutenant Governor Cruz Bustamante, Attorney General Bill Lockyer, Treasurer Phil Angelides, Controller Kathleen Connell, and State Superintendent of Public Instruction Delaine Eastin. In addition, California Democrats increased their majority in the State Assembly from 43 to 48, and also in the state senate from 23 to 25.

=== 21st century ===
Holding off a national Republican trend in 2002, California Democrats won all eight statewide offices for the first time since 1882. Governor Gray Davis, Lieutenant Governor Cruz Bustamante, Attorney General Bill Lockyer, and State Treasurer Phil Angelides were all re-elected, while Steve Westly was elected State Controller, Kevin Shelley was elected Secretary of State, John Garamendi was elected Insurance Commissioner, and Jack O'Connell was elected State Superintendent of Public Instruction.

This feat (winning all statewide offices) was repeated in 2010, when, despite massive Republican gains nationwide, the California Democratic Party swept all the statewide offices being contested, maintained its 34–19 edge in the 53-member U.S. House delegation, and won one additional seat (thus increasing their majority) in the State Assembly, while maintaining their current majority in the state senate.

In the 2012 election, California Democrats experienced tremendous success once again: Not only did President Barack Obama win California's 55 electoral votes again, with over 60% of the vote, and Senator Dianne Feinstein was re-elected with over 62% of the vote, but California Democrats – despite running in federal and legislative districts that were redrawn by an independent redistricting commission for the first time, per the passage of Propositions 11 and 20, and the implementation of a new blanket primary – also won a net gain of four House seats by defeating three GOP incumbents and winning an open GOP seat, and won a supermajority in both houses of the state legislature, a feat which the party last accomplished in 1882. Geographically, the 2012 elections also witnessed the California Democratic Party make inroads in traditionally Republican areas: San Diego, the second largest city in California and a long-time GOP stronghold, elected a Democratic mayor for the first time since 1988. California Democrats also notched up victories in other traditionally Republican areas, such as the Inland Empire, Ventura County, the Central Valley, and Orange County.

=== Participation of "independent" voters in primaries ===
Since January 2001, California has had a "modified" closed primary system in which political parties can determine whether or not to allow voters who are not affiliated with any party (i.e. "independent") to participate in the party's primary. The passage of Proposition 14 limited this "modified" closed primary system to primaries for President of the United States, starting with the 2012 primaries. Since the primaries in 2004, the California Democratic Party has allowed "independent" voters to vote in every Democratic primaries, as applicable.

== Governance and organization ==
=== Leadership ===
Officers of the California Democratic Party are elected by Delegates of the Democratic State Central Committee at the Spring Re-Organizing Meeting following the Midterm or Presidential Elections. All officers serve 4 year staggered terms with the Chair, 1st Vice-Chair, and 2nd-Vice Chair being elected following presidential elections, and the Secretary and Controller being elected following midterm elections. Below are the current officers:

- Chair: Rusty Hicks
- 1st Vice-chair: Deepa Sharma
- 2nd Vice-chair: David Campos
- Secretary: Diana Love
- Controller: Carolyn Fowler

=== Party delegates ===
The California Democratic Party is a "political party that has detailed statutory provisions applicable to its operation", which are in division 7, part 2 of the California Elections Code. The Democratic State Central Committee, which is the governing body of the California Democratic Party, functions pursuant to its standing rules and bylaws. The Democratic State Central Committee (DSCC) is composed of approximately 2,900 delegates that are selected through a wide variety of manners. Including being a Democratic elected official or a California Democratic Party official; or being appointed by chartered organizations of the California Democratic Party or county central committees; or being elected as an Assembly District Delegate. The executive board is composed of approximately 320 members and holds all powers and duties of the California Democratic Party while the DSCC or its conventions are not in session.

There are semi-autonomous county central committees for each of California's 58 counties. Each county central committee elects 4 members, plus a member for each 10,000 registered Democrats in that county, to the state central committee. The state central committee bylaws specify that county central committees may provide for the election of their allocation of membership on an at-large basis, or by county supervisor districts or Assembly districts, or by any combination thereof.

Of the DSCC Delegates, 1,120 are Assembly District Delegates, elected by registered Democrats within each of California's 80 Assembly districts in "Assembly district election meetings" (ADEM's). ADEM elections are held biennially in January in every odd numbered year with voters electing 14 delegates to the state central committee per assembly district, divided as equally as possible between men and women, with the highest vote getter in each district regardless of gender, serving as that district's representative to the executive board.

All DSCC members are elected to 2 year terms. The DSCC meets annually in the spring as a State Convention, with State Conventions in even-numbered years deemed as a "Platform Convention", where the state platform is revised, and State Conventions in odd-numbered years deemed as a "Re-Organizing Meeting", where resolutions are considered.

=== Standing committees ===
The Democratic State Central Committee is organized into nine standing committees: Platform, Resolutions, Rules, Legislation, Affirmative Action, Credentials, Finance, Organizational Development, and Voter Services. Its headquarters are at 1830 9th St Sacramento, California.

=== County central committees ===
At every direct primary election, a county central committee is elected in each county. The California Elections Code specifies how county central committee members are elected. Candidates for county central committees are nominated pursuant to division 8, part 1, chapter 1 of the Elections Code, which defines requirements such as the number of Democratic registered voters required (20–40) to sign a nomination. A county central committee may also select its members at any time by holding a caucus or convention or by using any other method of selection approved by the committee. If the number of candidates nominated for election does not exceed the number of candidates to be elected, the candidates are not listed on the ballots, but are instead declared elected by the board of supervisors.

County central committees
County party	Elected members
Los Angeles County Democratic Party	There are 7 county central committee members elected at-large by Democratic voters in each California State Assembly district contained wholly or partially within Los Angeles County.
San Diego County Democratic Party	There are 6 county central committee members elected by Democratic voters in each California State Assembly district contained within San Diego County.
Orange County Democratic Party	There are 6 county central committee members elected by Democratic voters in each California State Assembly district contained within Orange County at the primary election in each even numbered year.
Santa Clara County Democratic Party	There are 6 county central committee members elected by Democratic voters in each California State Assembly district contained within Santa Clara County.
Alameda County Democratic Party	There are 6 county central committee members elected by Democratic voters in each California State Assembly district contained within Alameda County.
Sacramento County Democratic Party	There are 6 county central committee members elected by Democratic voters in each supervisor district in Sacramento County.
San Francisco Democratic Party	The 24-member county central committee is elected from the two Assembly districts in San Francisco, with a 14/10 member split between the two Assembly districts based on number of registered Democrats.
San Mateo County Democratic Party	There are 22 elected members of the San Mateo County Democratic Central Committee. They are elected by Democratic voters in each County Supervisor District every four years in the presidential election cycle.
Santa Cruz County Democratic Party	There are 21 elected members of the Santa Cruz County Democratic Central Committee. They are elected by Democratic voters in each County Supervisor District every four years in the presidential election cycle.
Fresno County Democratic Party	There are 23 elected members of the Fresno County Democratic Central Committee. They are elected by Democratic voters in each County Supervisor District every four years in the presidential election cycle.

=== List of chairs ===
- George T. Marye (1888–1893)
- Ben F. Maddox (1894–1896)
- William H. Alford (1896–1898)
- Seth Mann (1898–1900)
- John E. Raker (1908–1910)
- Claude F. Purkitt (1922–1928)
- Harry H. McPike (1929–1930)
- Zachary T. Malaby (1930–1931)
- Justus S. Wardell (1931–1932)
- Maurice Harrison (1932–1934)
- Culbert L. Olson (1934–1937)
- Clifford C. Anglim (1937–1938)
- John Gee Clark (1938–1939)
- Paul Peek (1939–1940)
- William M. Malone (1940–1942)
- Alfred W. Robertson (1942–1944)
- William M. Malone (1944–1946)
- James Roosevelt (1946–1948)
- Oliver Jesse Carter (1949)
- Glenn M. Anderson (1950–1952)
- George Miller Jr. (1952–1954)
- Elizabeth C. Snyder (1954–1956)
- Roger Kent (1957–1958)
- William H. Rosenthal (1958–1959)
- William Munnell (1959–1960)
- Charles Warren (1966–1968)
- Charles Manatt (1969–1973)
- John Burton (1973–1974)
- Bert Coffey (1977–1979)
- Richard J. O'Neill (1979–1981)
- Nancy Pelosi (1981–1983)
- Peter D. Kelly III (1983–1985)
- Betty Smith (1985–1987)
- Peter D. Kelly III (1987–1989)
- Jerry Brown (1989–1991)
- Phil Angelides (1991–1993)
- Bill Press (1993–1996)
- Art Torres (1996–2009)
- John Burton (2009–2017)
- Eric C. Bauman (2017–2018)
- Alex Gallardo-Rooker (acting, 2018–2019)
- Rusty Hicks (2019–present)

== Platform ==
The California Democratic Party published a 2022 platform.

== Current elected officials ==
The following is a list of Democratic statewide and legislative officeholders, as of January 2, 2023 (federal office holders as of January 20, 2021);

=== Statewide constitutional officers ===
Democrats have controlled all eight elected statewide constitutional offices since 2011. The current eight elected statewide officers are:

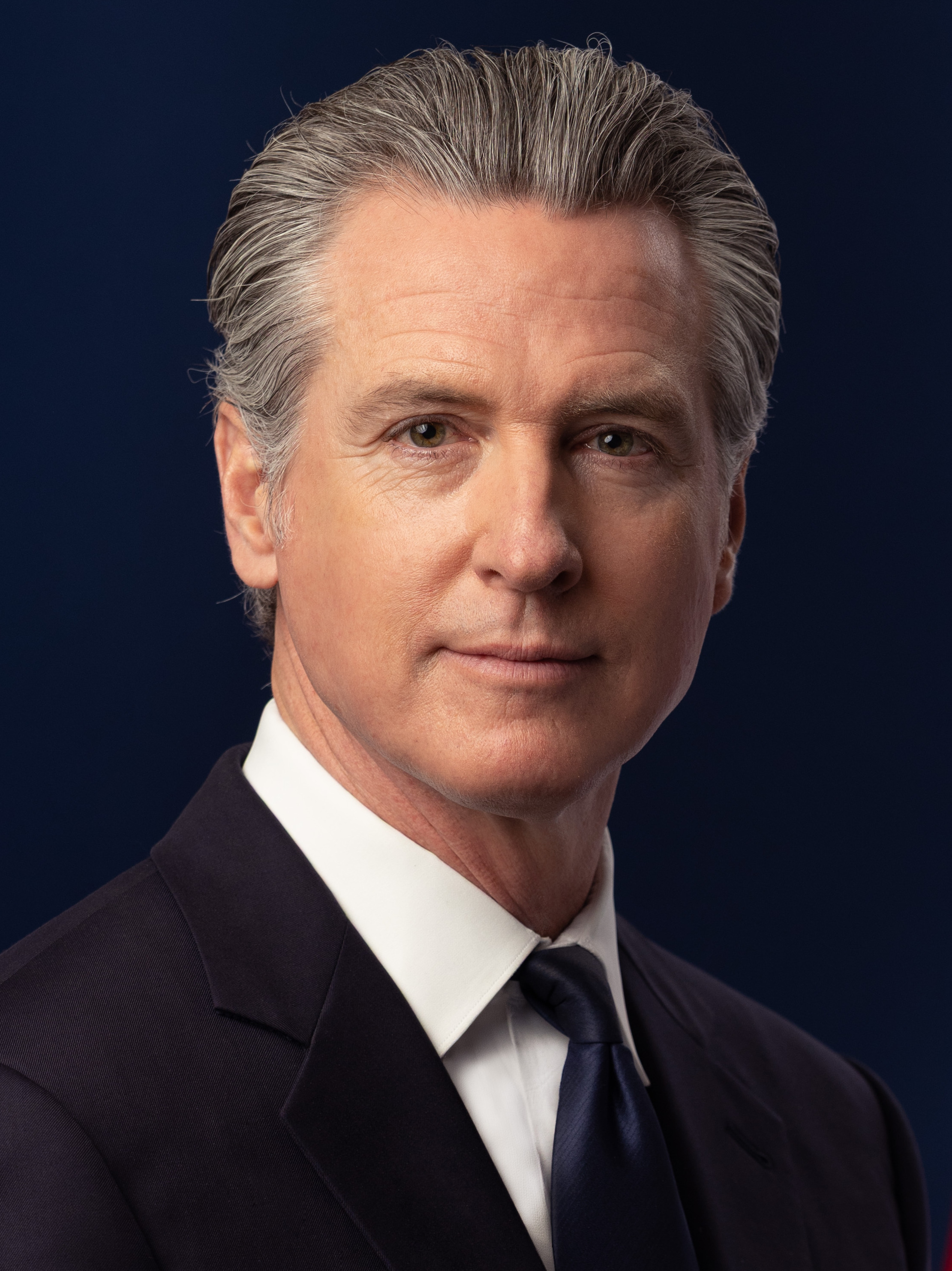
Governor Gavin Newsom

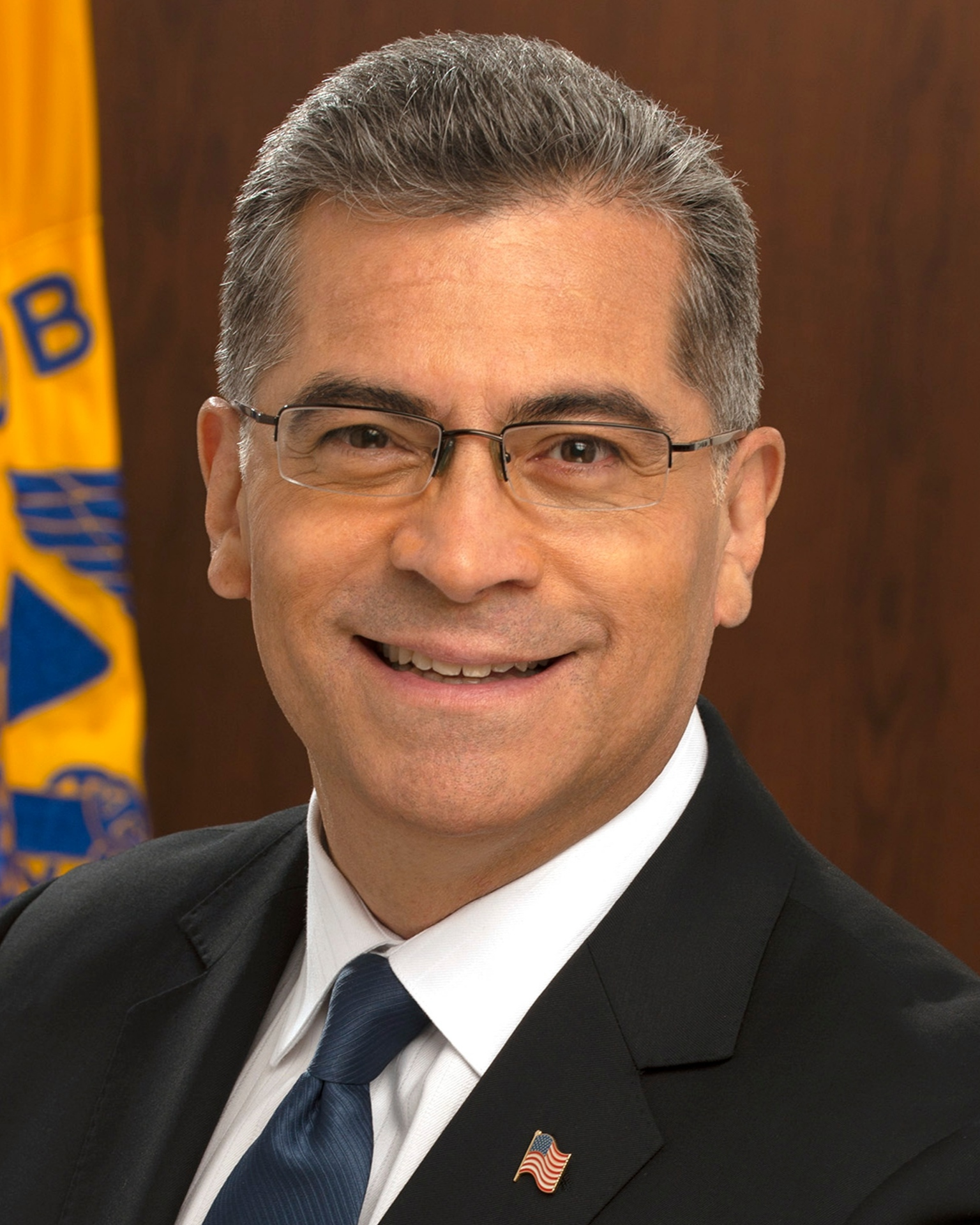
Governor-elect Xavier Becerra

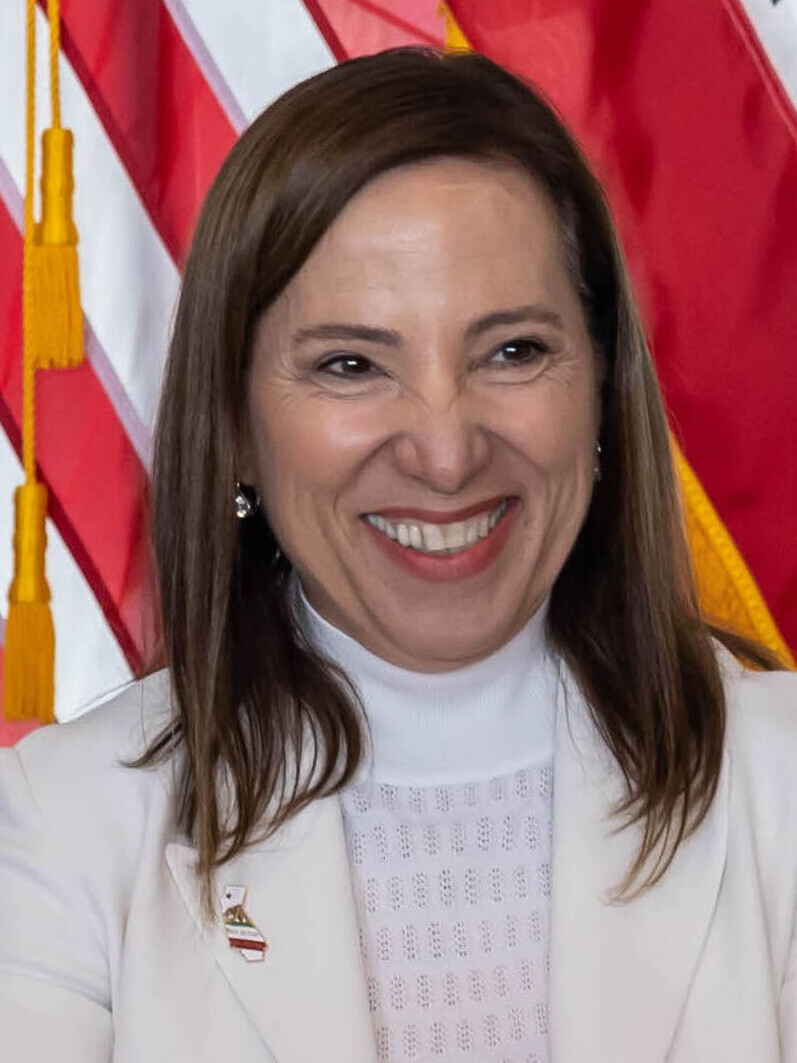
Lieutenant Governor → Treasurer-elect Eleni Kounalakis

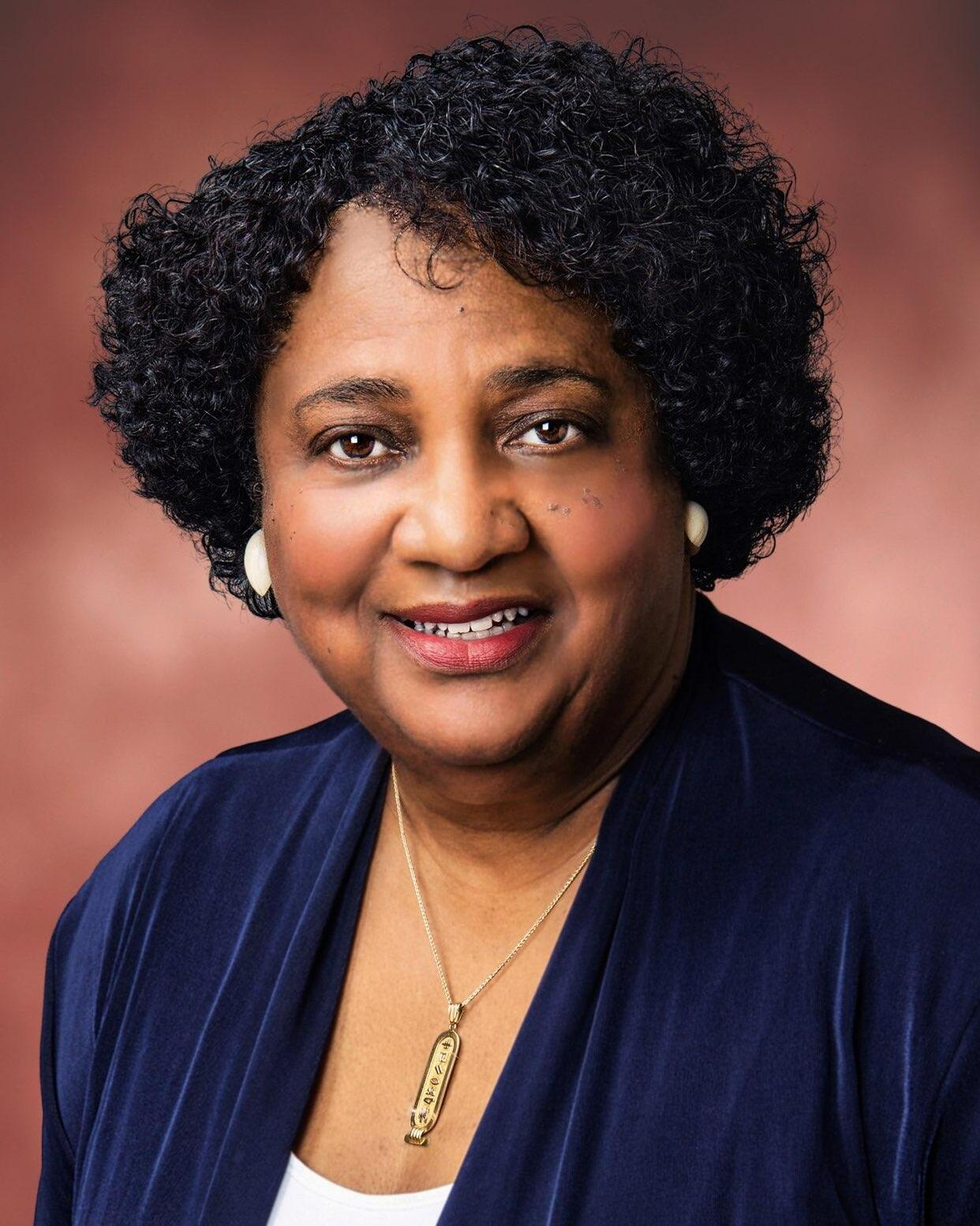
Secretary of the State Shirley Weber

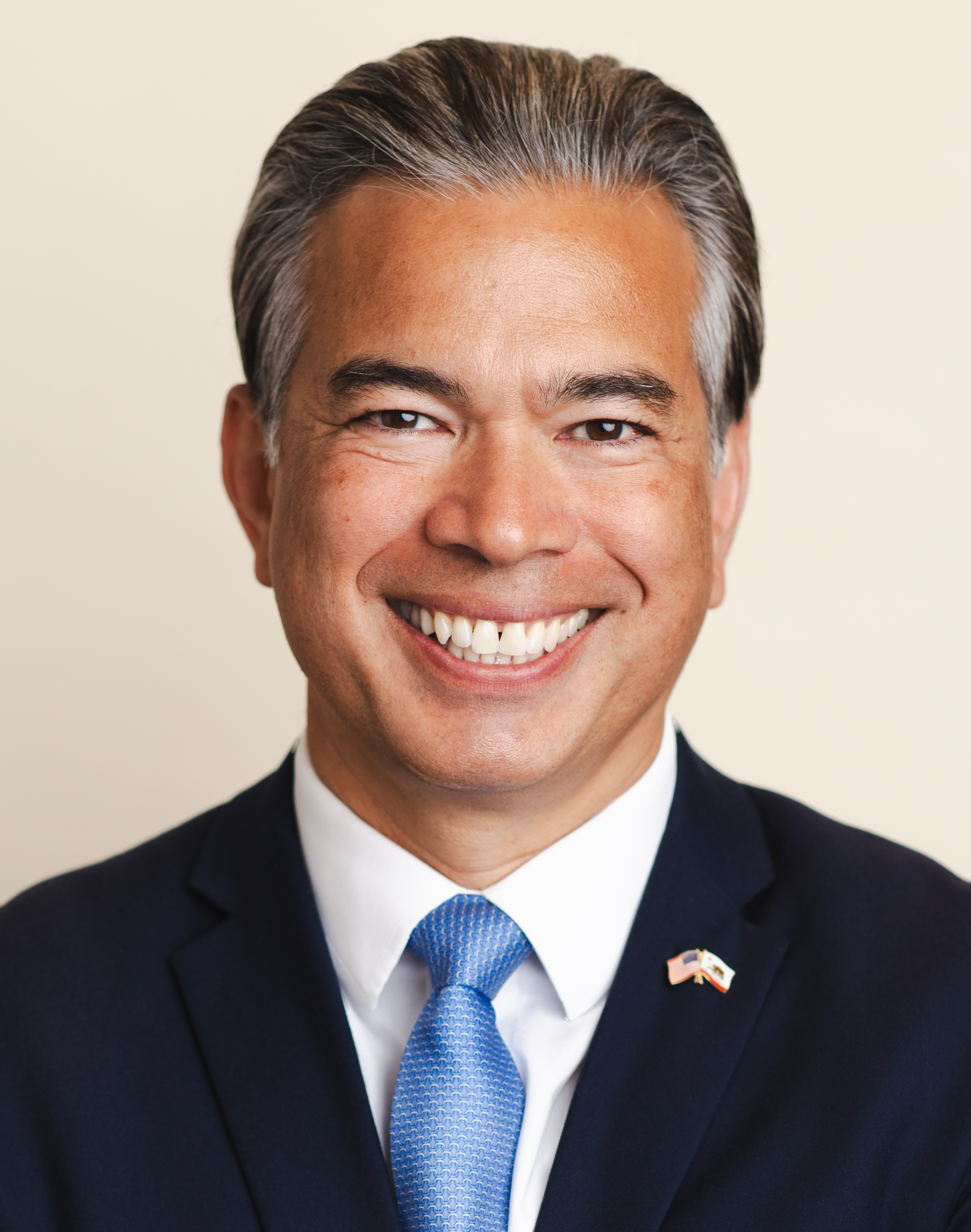
Attorney General Rob Bonta

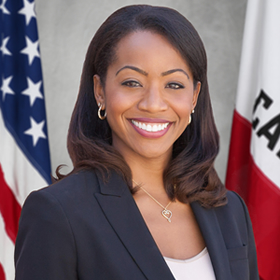
Controller Malia Cohen

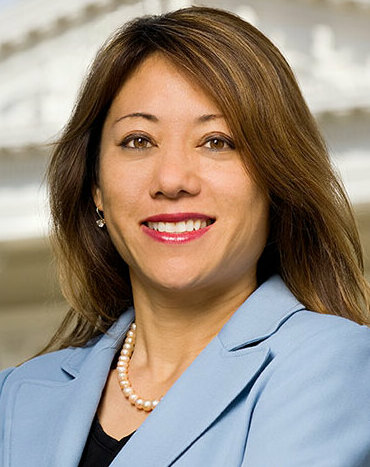
Treasurer → Lieutenant Governor-elect Fiona Ma

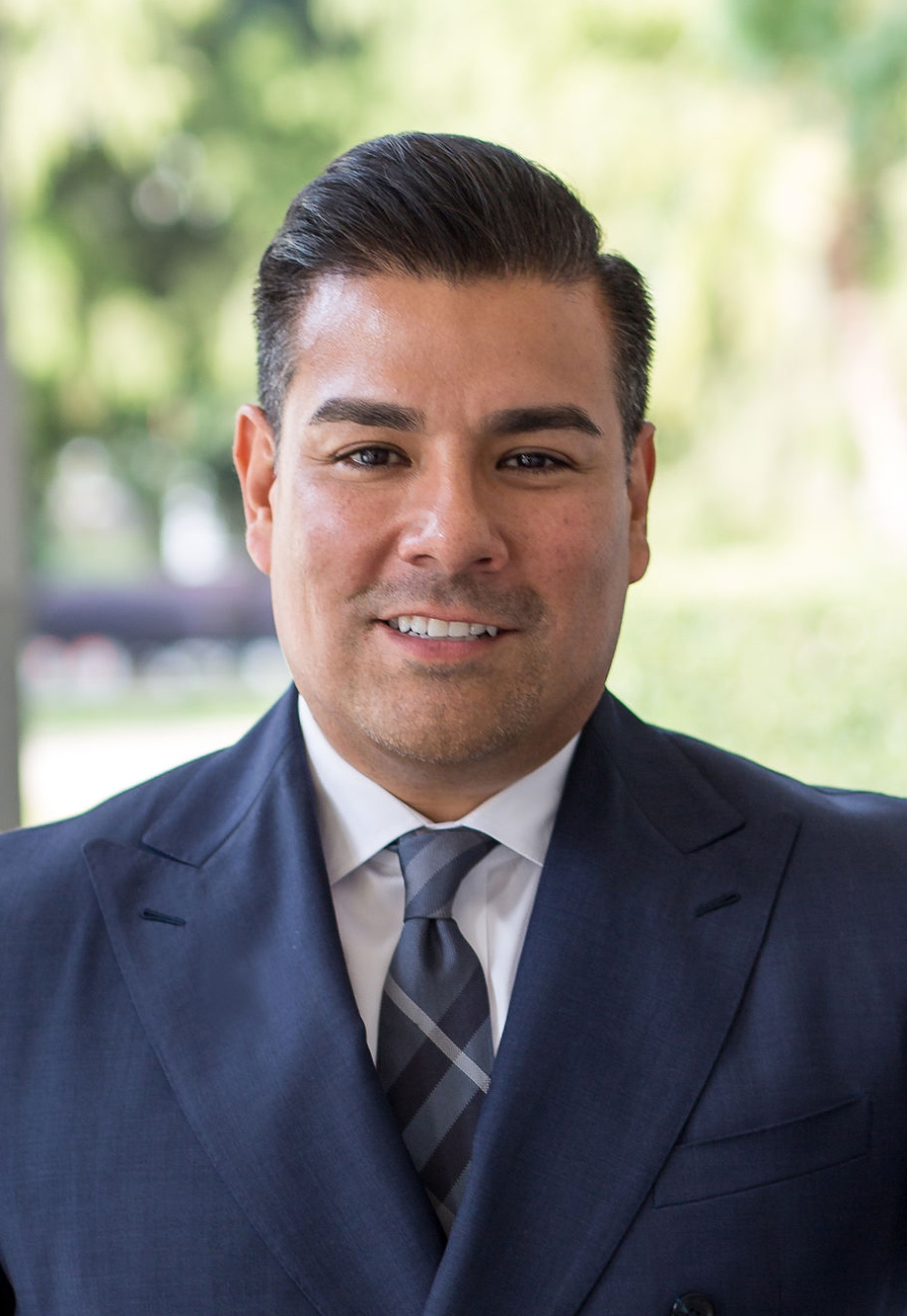
Insurance Commissioner Ricardo Lara

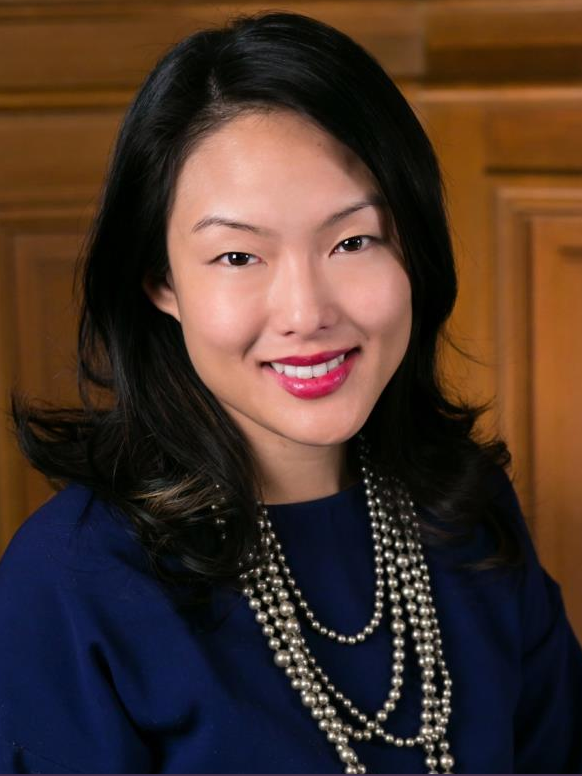
Insurance Commissioner-elect Jane Kim

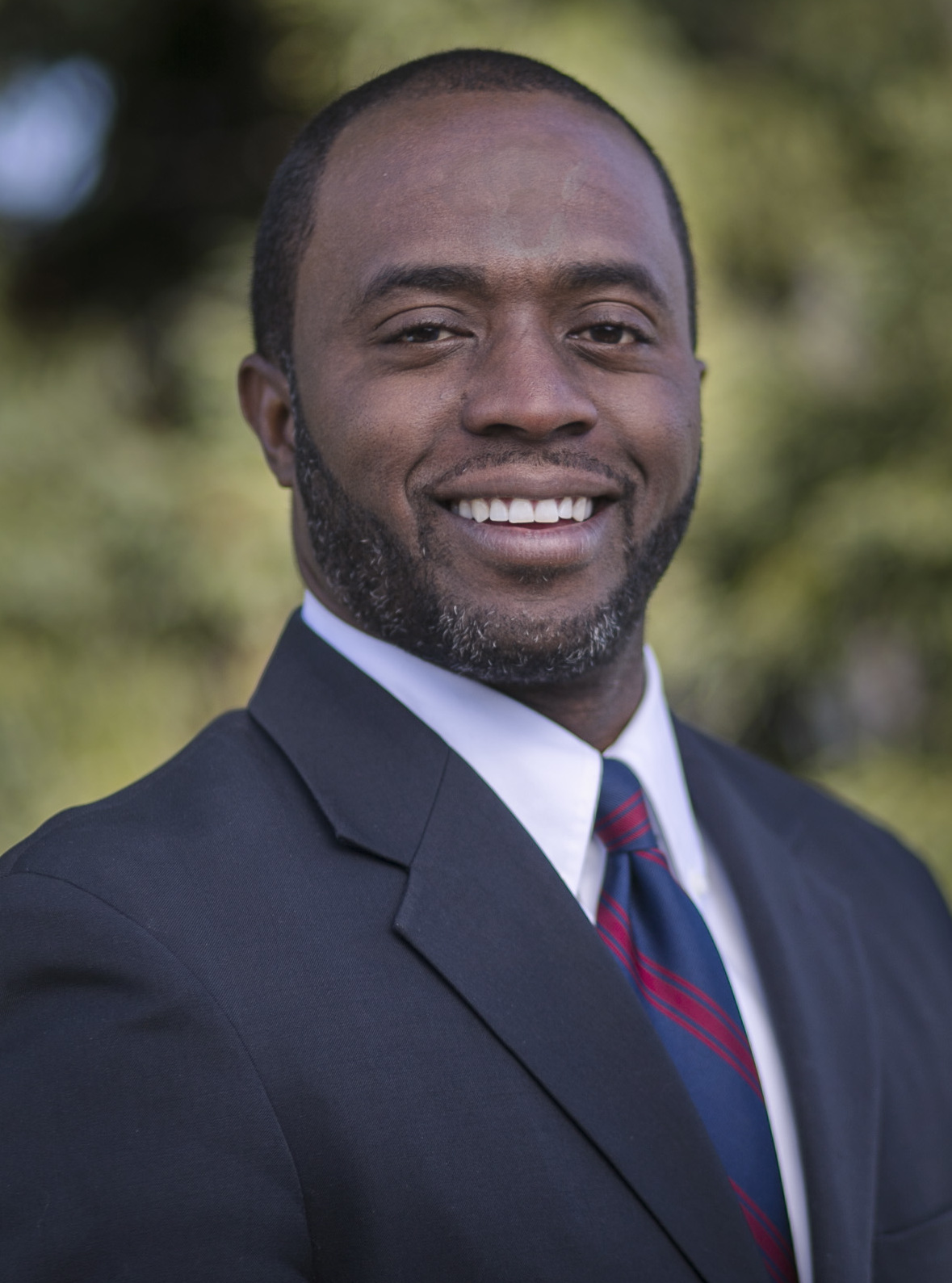
Superintendent of Public Instruction Tony Thurmond

Superintendent of Public Instruction-elect Richard Barrera

=== Federal officeholders for the 119th United States Congress ===
==== U.S. Senate ====
Both of California's seats in the U.S. Senate have been under Democratic control since 1992. California's current U.S. senators are:

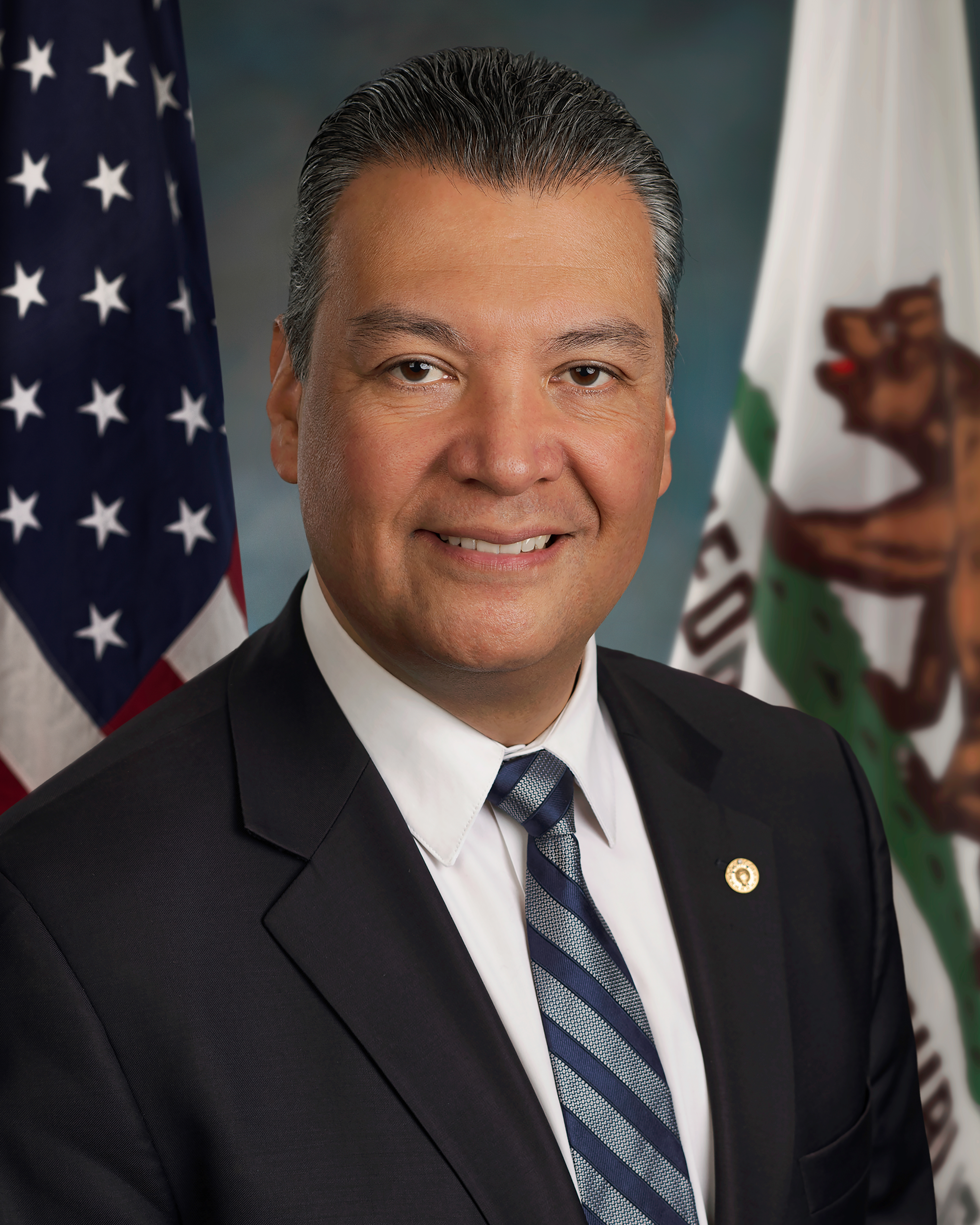
Senior U.S. Senator Alex Padilla

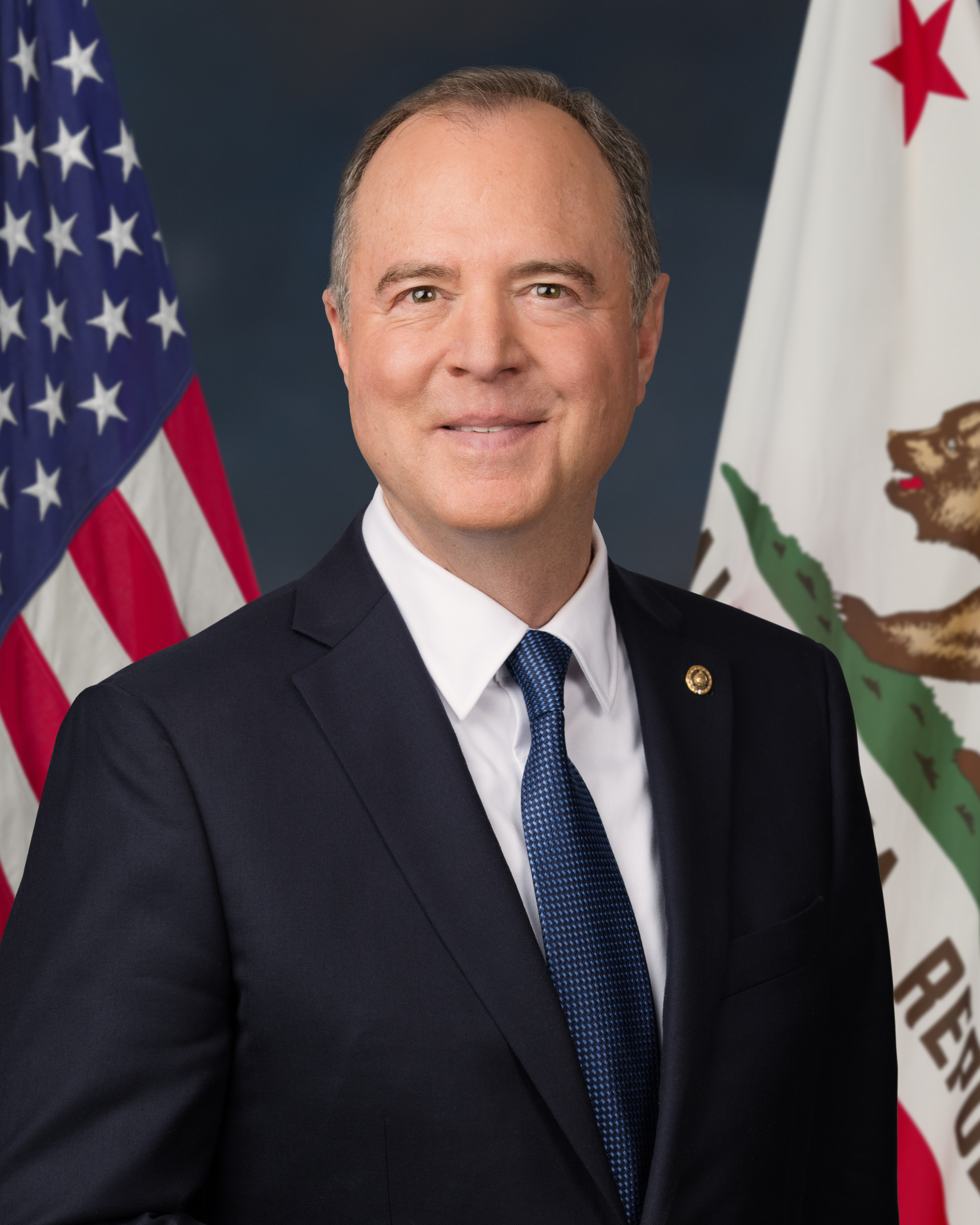
Junior U.S. Senator Adam Schiff

==== U.S. House of Representatives ====
Of the 52 seats California is apportioned in the U.S. House following the 2020 census, 43 are held by Democrats:

District	Member	Photo
1st	Mike McGuire (elect)	
2nd	Jared Huffman	
6th → 3rd	Ami Bera	
4th	Mike Thompson	
4th	Eric Jones (elect)	
6th	Richard Pan (elect)	
7th	Doris Matsui	
8th	John Garamendi	
9th	Josh Harder	
10th	Mark DeSaulnier	
11th	Nancy Pelosi	
11th	Scott Wiener (elect)	
12th	Lateefah Simon	
13th	Adam Gray	
14th	Aisha Wahab	
15th	Kevin Mullin	
16th	Sam Liccardo	
17th	Ro Khanna	
18th	Zoe Lofgren	
19th	Jimmy Panetta	
21st	Jim Costa	
22nd	Randy Villegas (elect)	
24th	Salud Carbajal	
25th	Raul Ruiz	
26th	Julia Brownley	
26th	Jacqui Irwin (elect)	
27th	George T. Whitesides	
28th	Judy Chu	
29th	Luz Rivas	
30th	Laura Friedman	
31st	Gil Cisneros	
32nd	Brad Sherman	
33rd	Pete Aguilar (House Majority Whip-designate)	
34th	Jimmy Gomez	
34th	Angela Gonzales-Torres (elect)	
35th	Norma Torres	
36th	Ted Lieu	
37th	Sydney Kamlager-Dove	
38th	Hilda Solis (elect)	
39th	Mark Takano	
38th → 41st	Linda Sánchez	
42nd	Robert Garcia	
43rd	Maxine Waters	
44th	Nanette Barragán	
45th	Derek Tran	
46th	Lou Correa	
47th	Dave Min	
48th	Marni von Wilpert (elect)	
49th	Mike Levin	
50th	Scott Peters	
51st	Sara Jacobs	
52nd	Juan Vargas	

=== Board of Equalization, State Senate, and State Assembly ===
==== Board of Equalization ====
Democrats hold four of the five seats on the State Board of Equalization: three of the four district-based seats, and the at-large ex officio seat reserved for the incumbent State Controller, who, in this instance, is Democrat Malia Cohen.

- 1st District: Nelson Esparza (elect)
- 2nd District: Sally Lieber
- 3rd District: Tony Vazquez → Mike Gipson (elect)
- 4th District: Mike Schaefer → Tom Umberg (elect)
- State Controller: Malia Cohen

==== State Senate ====
As of March 11, 2025, Democrats hold a 30–10 supermajority in the 40-member California State Senate. The Democrats have been the majority party in the Senate continuously since 1956.

- SD 2: Mike McGuire → Damon Connolly (elect)
- SD 3: Christopher Cabaldon
- SD 5: Jerry McNerney
- SD 7: Jesse Arreguín
- SD 8: Angelique Ashby
- SD 9: Tim Grayson
- SD 10: Scott Sakakihara (elect)
- SD 11: Scott Wiener
- SD 13: Josh Becker
- SD 14: Anna Caballero → Esmeralda Soria (elect)
- SD 15: Dave Cortese
- SD 16: Melissa Hurtado
- SD 17: John Laird
- SD 18: Steve Padilla
- SD 19: Monique Limón (President pro Tempore)
- SD 20: Caroline Menjivar
- SD 22: Susan Rubio
- SD 24: Ben Allen → Brian Goldsmith (elect)
- SD 25: Sasha Renée Pérez
- SD 26: Maria Elena Durazo → Sara Hernandez (elect)
- SD 27: Henry Stern
- SD 28: Lola Smallwood-Cuevas
- SD 29: Eloise Reyes
- SD 30: Bob Archuleta
- SD 31: Sabrina Cervantes
- SD 33: Lena Gonzalez (Majority Leader)
- SD 34: Tom Umberg → Avelino Valencia (elect)
- SD 35: Laura Richardson
- SD 36: Chris Duncan (elect)
- SD 38: Catherine Blakespear
- SD 39: Akilah Weber
- SD 40: Mara Elliott (elect)

==== State Assembly ====
As of January 2025, Democrats hold a 60–20 supermajority in the 80-seat California State Assembly. The Democrats have been the majority party in the Assembly continuously since 1996.

- AD 2: Chris Rogers
- AD 3: Dom Belza (elect)
- AD 4: Cecilia Aguiar-Curry (Majority Leader)
- AD 6: Maggy Krell
- AD 7: Amy Slavensky (elect)
- AD 10: Stephanie Nguyen
- AD 11: Lori Wilson
- AD 12: Damon Connolly → Jackie Elward (elect)
- AD 13: Rhodesia Ransom
- AD 14: Buffy Wicks
- AD 15: Anamarie Avila Farias
- AD 16: Rebecca Bauer-Kahan
- AD 17: Matt Haney
- AD 18: Mia Bonta
- AD 19: Catherine Stefani
- AD 20: Liz Ortega
- AD 21: Diane Papan
- AD 23: Marc Berman
- AD 24: Alex Lee
- AD 25: Ash Kalra
- AD 26: Patrick Ahrens
- AD 27: Esmeralda Soria → Brian Pacheco (elect)
- AD 28: Gail Pellerin
- AD 29: Robert Rivas (Speaker)
- AD 30: Dawn Addis
- AD 31: Joaquin Arambula → Annalisa Perea (elect)
- AD 35: Jasmeet Bains → Andrae Gonzales (elect)
- AD 36: Ida Obeso-Martinez (elect)
- AD 37: Gregg Hart
- AD 38: Steve Bennett
- AD 39: Juan Carrillo
- AD 40: Pilar Schiavo
- AD 41: John Harabedian
- AD 42: Jacqui Irwin → Deborah Klein Lopez (elect)
- AD 43: Celeste Rodriguez
- AD 44: Nick Schultz
- AD 45: James Ramos
- AD 46: Jesse Gabriel
- AD 46: Leila Namvar (elect)
- AD 48: Blanca Rubio
- AD 49: Mike Fong
- AD 50: Robert Garcia
- AD 51: Rick Zbur
- AD 52: Jessica Caloza
- AD 53: Freddie Rodriguez
- AD 54: Mark Gonzalez
- AD 55: Isaac Bryan
- AD 56: Lisa Calderon
- AD 57: Sade Elhawary
- AD 58: Clarissa Cervantes (elect)
- AD 60: Corey Jackson
- AD 61: Tina McKinnor
- AD 62: Jose Solache
- AD 64: Blanca Pacheco
- AD 65: Mike Gipson → Ayanna Davis (elect)
- AD 66: Al Muratsuchi → Paul Seo (elect)
- AD 67: Sharon Quirk-Silva → Mark Pulido (elect)
- AD 68: Avelino Valencia → Jessie Lopez (elect)
- AD 69: Josh Lowenthal
- AD 70: Paula Swift (elect)
- AD 73: Cottie Petrie-Norris
- AD 74: Sergio Farias
- AD 76: Darshana Patel
- AD 77: Tasha Boerner Horvath
- AD 78: Chris Ward
- AD 79: LaShae Sharp-Collins
- AD 80: David Alvarez

=== Mayoral offices ===
Most of the state's major cities have Democratic mayors. As of March 25th 2026, Democrats control the mayor's offices in eight of California's ten largest cities:

- Los Angeles (1): Karen Bass → Nithya Raman (elect)
- San Diego (2): Todd Gloria
- San Jose (3): Matt Mahan
- San Francisco (4): Daniel Lurie
- Sacramento (6): Kevin McCarty
- Long Beach (7): Rex Richardson
- Oakland (8): Barbara Lee
- Anaheim (10): Ashleigh Aitken

== Election results ==
=== Federal ===
==== Presidential ====
California Democratic Party presidential election results
Election	Presidential Ticket	Votes	Vote %	Electoral votes	Result
1852	Franklin Pierce/William R. King	40,721	53.02%	4 / 4	Won
1856	James Buchanan/John C. Breckinridge	53,342	48.38%	4 / 4	Won
1860	Stephen A. Douglas/Herschel V. Johnson	37,999	31.71%	0 / 4	Lost
1864	George B. McClellan/George H. Pendleton	43,837	41.40%	0 / 5	Lost
1868	Horatio Seymour/Francis Preston Blair Jr.	54,068	49.76%	0 / 5	Lost
1872	Horace Greeley/Benjamin G. Brown (Liberal Republican)	40,717	42.51%	0 / 6	Lost
1876	Samuel J. Tilden/Thomas A. Hendricks	76,460	49.08%	0 / 6	Lost
1880	Winfield S. Hancock/William H. English	80,426	48.98%	5 / 6	Lost
1884	Grover Cleveland/Thomas A. Hendricks	89,288	45.33%	0 / 8	Won
1888	Grover Cleveland/Allen G. Thurman	117,729	46.84%	0 / 8	Lost
1892	Grover Cleveland/Adlai E. Stevenson	118,174	43.83%	8 / 9	Won
1896	William Jennings Bryan/Arthur Sewall	144,766	48.51%	1 / 9	Lost
1900	William Jennings Bryan/Adlai E. Stevenson	124,985	41.34%	0 / 9	Lost
1904	Alton B. Parker/Henry G. Davis	89,404	26.94%	0 / 10	Lost
1908	William Jennings Bryan/John W. Kern	127,492	32.98%	0 / 10	Lost
1912	Woodrow Wilson/Thomas R. Marshall	283,436	41.81%	2 / 13	Won
1916	Woodrow Wilson/Thomas R. Marshall	466,289	46.65%	13 / 13	Won
1920	James M. Cox/Franklin D. Roosevelt	229,191	24.28%	0 / 13	Lost
1924	John W. Davis/Charles W. Bryan	105,514	8.23%	0 / 13	Lost
1928	Al Smith/Joseph T. Robinson	614,365	34.19%	0 / 13	Lost
1932	Franklin D. Roosevelt/John N. Garner	1,324,157	58.39%	22 / 22	Won
1936	Franklin D. Roosevelt/John N. Garner	1,766,836	66.95%	22 / 22	Won
1940	Franklin D. Roosevelt/Henry A. Wallace	1,877,618	57.44%	22 / 22	Won
1944	Franklin D. Roosevelt/Harry S. Truman	1,988,564	56.48%	25 / 25	Won
1948	Harry S. Truman/Alben W. Barkley	1,913,134	47.57%	25 / 25	Won
1952	Adlai Stevenson/John Sparkman	2,257,646	42.27%	0 / 32	Lost
1956	Adlai Stevenson/Estes Kefauver	2,420,135	44.27%	0 / 32	Lost
1960	John F. Kennedy/Lyndon B. Johnson	3,224,099	49.55%	0 / 32	Won
1964	Lyndon B. Johnson/Hubert Humphrey	4,171,877	59.11%	40 / 40	Won
1968	Hubert Humphrey/Edmund Muskie	3,244,318	44.74%	0 / 40	Lost
1972	George McGovern/Sargent Shriver	3,475,847	41.54%	0 / 45	Lost
1976	Jimmy Carter/Walter Mondale	3,742,284	47.57%	0 / 45	Won
1980	Jimmy Carter/Walter Mondale	3,083,661	35.91%	0 / 45	Lost
1984	Walter Mondale/Geraldine Ferraro	3,922,519	41.27%	0 / 47	Lost
1988	Michael Dukakis/Lloyd Bentsen	4,702,233	47.56%	0 / 47	Lost
1992	Bill Clinton/Al Gore	5,121,325	46.01%	54 / 54	Won
1996	Bill Clinton/Al Gore	5,119,835	51.10%	54 / 54	Won
2000	Al Gore/Joe Lieberman	5,861,203	53.45%	54 / 54	Lost
2004	John Kerry/John Edwards	6,745,485	54.31%	55 / 55	Lost
2008	Barack Obama/Joe Biden	8,274,473	61.01%	55 / 55	Won
2012	Barack Obama/Joe Biden	7,854,285	60.24%	55 / 55	Won
2016	Hillary Clinton/Tim Kaine	8,753,788	61.73%	55 / 55	Lost
2020	Joe Biden/Kamala Harris	11,110,250	63.48%	55 / 55	Won
2024	Kamala Harris/Tim Walz	9,276,179	58.47%	54 / 54	Lost

==== U.S. Senate ====
Class 1
Year	Candidate	Votes	%	Result
1982	Jerry Brown	3,494,968	44.78%	Lost ✗
1988	Leo T. McCarthy	4,287,253	44.00%	Lost ✗
1992 (special)	Dianne Feinstein	5,853,651	54.59%	Won ✓
1994	Dianne Feinstein	3,979,152	46.74%	Won ✓
2000	Dianne Feinstein	5,932,522	55.84%	Won ✓
2006	Dianne Feinstein	5,076,289	59.43%	Won ✓
2012	Dianne Feinstein	7,864,624	62.72%	Won ✓
2018	Dianne Feinstein	6,019,422	54.16%	Won ✓
2018	Kevin de León	5,093,942	45.84%	Lost ✗
2024	Adam Schiff	9,036,252	58.87%	Won ✓

Class 3
Year	Candidate	Votes	%	Result
1986	Alan Cranston	3,646,672	49.29%	Won ✓
1992	Barbara Boxer	5,173,467	47.90%	Won ✓
1998	Barbara Boxer	4,411,705	53.06%	Won ✓
2004	Barbara Boxer	6,955,728	57.71%	Won ✓
2010	Barbara Boxer	5,218,137	52.18%	Won ✓
2016	Kamala Harris	7,542,753	61.60%	Won ✓
2016	Loretta Sanchez	4,701,417	38.40%	Lost ✗
2022	Alex Padilla	6,621,621	61.06%	Won ✓

==== U.S. House ====
Election	Votes	%	Seats (CA)	±	%
2016	8,358,598	62.31	39 / 53	0	3.40
2018	8,010,445	65.74	46 / 53	▲7	3.43
2020	11,083,766	66.27	42 / 53	▼3	0.53
2022	6,743,737	63.28	40 / 52	▼2	2.99
2024	9,138,709	60.48	43 / 52	▲3	2.80
2026	7,645,126	69.80	48 / 52	▲5	TBD

=== State ===
==== Executive offices ====
Governor
Election	Candidate	Votes	%	Result
1849	Did not endorse a candidate			
1851	John Bigler	23,175	50.48%	Won ✓
1853	John Bigler	38,940	50.97%	Won ✓
1855	John Bigler	46,225	47.47%	Lost ✗
1857	John B. Weller	53,122	56.71%	Won ✓
1859	John Currey	31,298	30.46%	Lost ✗
1861	John Conness	30,944	25.63%	Lost ✗
1863	John G. Downey	44,622	40.97%	Lost ✗
1867	Henry Huntly Haight	49,895	54.03%	Won ✓
1871	Henry Huntly Haight	57,520	47.89%	Lost ✗
1875	William Irwin	61,509	50.03%	Won ✓
1879	Hugh J. Glenn	47,667	29.75%	Lost ✗
1882	George Stoneman	90,694	55.08%	Won ✓
1886	Washington Bartlett	84,965	43.43%	Won ✓
1890	Edward B. Pond	117,184	46.42%	Lost ✗
1894	James Budd	111,944	39.34%	Won ✓
1898	James G. Maguire	129,261	45.03%	Lost ✗
1902	Franklin Knight Lane	143,783	47.22%	Lost ✗
1906	Theodore Arlington Bell	117,645	37.71%	Lost ✗
1910	Theodore Arlington Bell	154,835	40.14%	Lost ✗
1914	J. B. Curtin	116,121	12.53%	Lost ✗
1918	Did not field a candidate			
1922	Thomas Lee Woolwine	347,530	35.98%	Lost ✗
1926	Justus S. Wardell	282,451	24.69%	Lost ✗
1930	Milton K. Young	333,973	24.13%	Lost ✗
1934	Upton Sinclair	879,537	37.75%	Lost ✗
1938	Culbert Olson	1,391,734	52.49%	Won ✓
1942	Culbert Olson	932,995	41.75%	Lost ✗
1946	Earl Warren (Republican) won party primary			
1950	James Roosevelt	1,333,856	35.14%	Lost ✗
1954	Richard P. Graves	1,739,368	43.16%	Lost ✗
1958	Pat Brown	3,140,076	59.75%	Won ✓
1962	Pat Brown	3,037,109	51.94%	Won ✓
1966	Pat Brown	2,749,174	42.27%	Lost ✗
1970	Jesse Unruh	2,938,607	45.14%	Lost ✗
1974	Jerry Brown	3,131,648	50.11%	Won ✓
1978	Jerry Brown	3,878,812	56.05%	Won ✓
1982	Tom Bradley	3,787,669	48.09%	Lost ✗
1986	Tom Bradley	2,781,714	37.38%	Lost ✗
1990	Dianne Feinstein	3,525,197	45.78%	Lost ✗
1994	Kathleen Brown	3,519,799	40.62%	Lost ✗
1998	Gray Davis	4,860,702	57.97%	Won ✓
2002	Gray Davis	3,533,490	47.26%	Won ✓
2003 (recall)	Cruz Bustamante (best-performing)	2,724,874	31.5%	Lost ✗
2006	Phil Angelides	3,376,732	38.91%	Lost ✗
2010	Jerry Brown	5,428,149	53.8%	Won ✓
2014	Jerry Brown	4,388,368	59.97%	Won ✓
2018	Gavin Newsom	7,721,410	61.95%	Won ✓
2021 (recall)	Kevin Paffrath (best-performing)	706,778	9.60%	Recall failed
2022	Gavin Newsom	6,470,104	59.18%	Won ✓
2026	Xavier Becerra	5,671,949	64.6%	Won ✓

Lieutenant Governor
Election	Candidate	Votes	%	Result
2014	Gavin Newsom	4,107,051	57.16%	Won ✓
2018	Eleni Kounalakis	5,914,068	55.56%	Won ✓
2018	Ed Hernandez	4,543,863	43.45%	Lost ✗
2022	Eleni Kounalakis	6,418,119	59.70%	Won ✓
2026	Fiona Ma	8,419,638	65.5%	Won ✓

Attorney General
Election	Candidate	Votes	%	Result
2014	Kamala Harris	4,102,649	57.49%	Won ✓
2018	Xavier Becerra	7,790,743	63.57%	Won ✓
2022	Rob Bonta	6,339,441	59.08%	Won ✓
2026	Rob Bonta	8,392,440	65.4%	Won ✓

Secretary of State
Election	Candidate	Votes	%	Result
2014	Alex Padilla	3,799,711	53.63%	Won ✓
2018	Alex Padilla	7,909,521	64.45%	Won ✓
2022	Shirley Weber	6,462,164	60.05%	Won ✓
2026	Shirley Weber	8,538,552	66.5%	Won ✓

State Controller
Election	Candidate	Votes	%	Result
2014	Betty Yee	3,810,304	53.97%	Won ✓
2018	Betty Yee	8,013,067	65.45%	Won ✓
2022	Malia Cohen	5,936,856	55.35%	Won ✓
2026	Malia Cohen	8,365,478	65.5%	Won ✓

State Treasurer
Election	Candidate	Votes	%	Result
2014	John Chiang	4,176,793	58.81%	Won ✓
2018	Fiona Ma	7,825,587	64.13%	Won ✓
2022	Fiona Ma	6,287,076	58.80%	Won ✓
2026	Eleni Kounalakis	8,380,266	65.7%	Won ✓

== See also ==
- Democratic Party (United States) organizations
- List of state parties of the Democratic Party (United States)
- Political party strength in California
