= California State Legislature, 2025–2026 session =

2025–2026 session of the California State Legislature
←	2023–2024	2027–2028	→
- The Seal of California

Overview
- Legislative body: California State Legislature
- Jurisdiction: California
- Term: December 2, 2024 – present

Senate
- Members: 40
- President of the Senate: Eleni Kounalakis (D); Jan. 7, 2019 – present
- President pro tempore: Mike McGuire (D–2nd) Feb. 5, 2024 – Nov. 17, 2025; Monique Limón (D–21st) Nov. 17, 2025 – present
- Minority Leader: Brian Jones (R–16th); Dec. 5, 2022 – present
- Party control: Democratic

Assembly
- Members: 80
- Speaker: Robert A. Rivas (D–29th); Jun. 30, 2023 – present
- Minority Leader: James Gallagher (R–3rd) Feb. 8, 2022 – Sep. 16, 2025; Heath Flora (R–9th) Sep. 16, 2025 – Aug. 3, 2026; Alexandra Macedo (R–33rd) Aug. 3, 2026 – present
- Party control: Democratic

The 2025–2026 session is the current session of the California State Legislature, composed of 40 members of the State Senate and 80 members of the State Assembly. The session first convened in Sacramento, California, on December 2, 2024, and will end on November 30, 2026, concurrent with the final two years of governor Gavin Newsom's second term.

Following the results of the 2024 U.S. presidential election, in which former president Donald Trump was elected to a second non-consecutive term, governor Newsom called for a special legislative session to "protect California values" and safeguard against Trump's policies.

The 2025–2026 session is made up of a record 49% women, with 37 in the Assembly and 21 in the Senate. With women making up 50% of Assembly Democrats, 50% of Senate Republicans and 52% of Senate Democrats.

== Major events ==
- June 6, 2025: Crossover deadline for bills to pass one house.

=== Vacancies and special elections ===
- November 30, 2024: Republican senator Janet Nguyen (36th–Huntington Beach) resigns before the session begins to join the Orange County Board of Supervisors.
- March 3, 2025: Republican businessman Stan Ellis (Bakersfield) is sworn into office after winning the February 25 special election to the 32nd State Assembly district to replace Fong.
- March 11, 2025: Republican mayor Tony Strickland (Huntington Beach) is sworn into office after winning the February 25 special election to replace Nguyen.
- April 1, 2025: Republican assemblymember Bill Essayli (63rd–Corona) resigns to become interim U.S. Attorney for the Central District of California.
- September 8, 2025: Republican mayor Natasha Johnson (Lake Elsinore) is sworn into office after winning the August 26 special election to replace Essayli.
- June 9, 2026: Republican assemblymember James Gallagher (3rd–East Nicolaus) resigns after winning the June 2 special election to the 1st congressional district to fill the vacant seat left by the death of congressman Doug LaMalfa on January 6.

=== Leadership changes ===
- September 16, 2025: Republican assemblymember Heath Flora (9th–Ripon) replaces assemblymember James Gallagher (3rd–Yuba City) as minority leader, as Gallagher was termed out at the end of the session.
- November 17, 2025: Democratic senator Monique Limón (21st–Santa Barbara) replaces senator Mike McGuire (2nd–Healdsburg) as president pro tempore of the Senate.
- August 3, 2026: Republican assemblymember Alexandra Macedo (33rd–Tulare) replaces assemblymemberHeath Flora (9th–Ripon) after Flora was ousted as minority leader.

== Legislation ==
The following bills were signed or vetoed by Governor Gavin Newsom in 2025 or 2026, were referred to the ballot by the legislature, or are awaiting gubernatorial action.

Particularly notable legislation includes:

- in September 2025, a package of energy legislation including:
  - AB 825 (amended SB 540) which pushes forward California joining a western grid, allowing for a regional transmission organization (RTO) instead of the California-only CAISO

=== Signed ===
- AB 130 – exempts most infill housing development from review under the California Environmental Quality Act.
- SB 131 – exempts certain other projects from CEQA review, including advanced manufacturing in industrial districts, high-speed rail, and wildfire mitigation.
- No Secret Police Act (SB 627) – prohibits certain federal and local law enforcement agencies from wearing masks while carrying out most operations
- AB 49 – requires that families be notified when immigration enforcement comes on school campuses, and requires a judicial warrant or court order for ICE to request student information
- SB 81 – requires a judicial warrant or court order for ICE to access emergency rooms and other non-public hospital areas
- SB 53 – requires large AI developers to publicly disclose protocols for development of frontier artificial intelligence models and develop safety policies, and holds such companies civilly liable for violations.
- AB 288 – allowing California workers covered under the National Labor Relations Act as of January 1, 2025 to petition the California Public Employee Relations Board when the federal National Labor Relations Board does not respond to unfair labor practice challenges, issue bargaining orders or respond to certification petitions within six months; creating the PERB Enforcement Fund sustained by civil penalties from employers found in violation of labor laws.
- SB 398 – criminalizes offering payments, other valuable items and chance to win a lottery or prize-drawing contest to incentivize voting or voter registration.
- AB 30 – allowing E15 fuel to be sold in California while the state studies its environmental impact.
- AB 8 – regulate intoxicating hemp products.
- SB 9 (Arreguín), which would authorize the HCD to void any local ADU ordinances which violate state law and apply state ADU standards until the local government passes remedial measures;
- AB 1154 (Carrillo), which aligns standards for all ADUs under 500 square feet;
- AB 413 (Fong) would require the HCD to translate key state housing guidelines and handbooks into the non-English languages commonly spoken in California
- SB 79 (Wiener), which would allow upzoning and rezoning near rail stations, rapid bus lines and other transit-oriented development zones within a half-mile of public transit stops, including in areas currently zoned only for single-family homes;
- AB 1061 (Quirk-Silva), allowing the HOME Act to be used in designated historic districts as long as an existing historic structure is not altered or demolished;
- AB 1308 (Hoover), establishing a 10-day period for inspecting small residential projects;
- AB 253 (Ward), allowing home builders to hire a licensed and certified third-party reviewer.;
- SB 543 (McNerney) codifies existing HCD guidance regarding ADUs and Junior ADUs (JADUs)
- AB 715 (Zbur) establishing a new Office of Civil Rights and an Antisemitism Prevention Coordinator who would help track and report antisemitism in schools

=== Referred to ballot measure ===
- 2025 California Proposition 50 – Amend the California Constitution to allow the state to use a new congressional district map for 2026 through 2030 (Passed on November 4, 2025 statewide ballot)
- SB 42 – repeals the ban on public financing of elections in California, extending to all cities and counties the ability to create programs for publicly financed elections (sent to November 2026 statewide ballot).

== State Senate ==
↓
30	10
Democratic	Republican

=== Officers ===
Position	Name	Party	District
Lieutenant Governor	Eleni Kounalakis	Democratic	
President pro tempore	Mike McGuire	Democratic	2nd–Healdsburg
Majority leader	Lena Gonzalez	Democratic	33rd-Long Beach
Assistant majority leader	Angelique Ashby	Democratic	8th-Sacramento
Assistant majority leader	Aisha Wahab	Democratic	10th-Hayward
Democratic Caucus Chair	Monique Limón	Democratic	21st–Santa Barbara
Majority whip	Dave Cortese	Democratic	15th–Los Gatos
Assistant majority whips	Maria Elena Durazo	Democratic	26th–Los Angeles
Assistant majority whips	Steve Padilla	Democratic	18th–Chula Vista
Minority leader	Brian Jones	Republican	40th–Santee
Secretary	Erika Contreras		
Sergeant-at-Arms	Katrina Rodriguez		
Chaplain	Sister Michelle Gorman, RSM		

The Secretary, the Sergeant-at-Arms, and the chaplain are not members of the Legislature.

=== Members ===
District	Name	Party	Residence	Term-limited?	Notes
1	Megan Dahle	Republican	Bieber		
2	Mike McGuire	Democratic	Healdsburg	Yes	President pro tempore until November 17, 2025
3	Christopher Cabaldon	Democratic	West Sacramento		
4	Marie Alvarado-Gil	Republican	Jackson		
5	Jerry McNerney	Democratic	Stockton		
6	Roger Niello	Republican	Fair Oaks		
7	Jesse Arreguín	Democratic	Berkeley		
8	Angelique Ashby	Democratic	Sacramento		
9	Tim Grayson	Democratic	Concord		
10	Aisha Wahab	Democratic	Hayward		
11	Scott Wiener	Democratic	San Francisco		
12	Shannon Grove	Republican	Bakersfield	Yes	
13	Josh Becker	Democratic	Menlo Park		
14	Anna Caballero	Democratic	Merced	Yes	
15	Dave Cortese	Democratic	San Jose		
16	Melissa Hurtado	Democratic	Bakersfield		
17	John Laird	Democratic	Santa Cruz		
18	Steve Padilla	Democratic	Chula Vista		
19	Rosilicie Ochoa Bogh	Republican	Yucaipa		
20	Caroline Menjivar	Democratic	Los Angeles		
21	Monique Limón	Democratic	Santa Barbara		President pro tempore from November 17, 2025
22	Susan Rubio	Democratic	Baldwin Park		
23	Suzette Martinez Valladares	Republican	Santa Clarita		
24	Ben Allen	Democratic	Santa Monica	Yes	
25	Sasha Renée Pérez	Democratic	Alhambra		
26	María Elena Durazo	Democratic	Los Angeles		
27	Henry Stern	Democratic	Malibu		
28	Lola Smallwood-Cuevas	Democratic	Los Angeles		
29	Eloise Reyes	Democratic	Grand Terrace		
30	Bob Archuleta	Democratic	Pico Rivera		
31	Sabrina Cervantes	Democratic	Corona		
32	Kelly Seyarto	Republican	Murrieta		
33	Lena Gonzalez	Democratic	Long Beach		Majority leader
34	Tom Umberg	Democratic	Santa Ana	Yes	
35	Laura Richardson	Democratic	Long Beach		
36	Tony Strickland	Republican	Huntington Beach		
37	Steven Choi	Republican	Irvine		
38	Catherine Blakespear	Democratic	Encinitas		
39	Akilah Weber	Democratic	San Diego		
40	Brian Jones	Republican	Santee	Yes	Minority leader

== State Assembly ==
↓
60	1	19
Democratic		Republican

=== Officers ===
Position	Name	Party	District
Speaker	Robert A. Rivas	Democratic	29th–Hollister
Speaker pro tempore	Josh Lowenthal	Democratic	69th–Long Beach
Assistant speaker pro tempore	Celeste Rodriguez	Democratic	43rd-San Fernando
Majority leader	Cecilia Aguiar-Curry	Democratic	4th–Winters
Assistant majority leader	Robert Garcia	Democratic	50th-Rancho Cucamonga
Assistant majority leader for policy and research	LaShae Sharp-Collins	Democratic	79th–San Diego
Majority whip	Mark Gonzalez	Democratic	54th–Los Angeles
Assistant majority whip	Michelle Rodriguez	Democratic	53rd–Pomona
Assistant majority whip	Jessica Caloza	Democratic	52nd–Los Angeles
Democratic caucus chair	Rick Zbur	Democratic	51st–Los Angeles
Republican leader	James Gallagher (until September 16, 2025)	Republican	3rd–East Nicolaus
Republican leader	Heath Flora (until August 3, 2026)	Republican	9th–Lodi
Republican leader	Alexandra Macedo (after August 3, 2026)	Republican	33rd–Tulare
Republican floor leader	Heath Flora (until September 16, 2025)	Republican	9th–Lodi
Republican floor leader	Kate Sanchez (until August 3, 2026)	Republican	71st–Trabuco Canyon
Republican floor leader	Josh Hoover (after August 3, 2026)	Republican	7th–Palmdale
Republican caucus chair	Tom Lackey (until September 24, 2025)	Republican	34th–Palmdale
Republican caucus chair	Juan Alanis (until August 3, 2026)	Republican	22nd–Modesto
Republican caucus chair	Natasha Johnson (after August 3, 2026)	Republican	63rd–Lake Elsinore
Republican deputy floor leader	Kate Sanchez (until September 24, 2025)	Republican	71st–Rancho Santa Margarita
Republican deputy floor leader	Heather Hadwick (until August 3, 2026)	Republican	1st–Alturas
Republican deputy floor leader	Joe Patterson (after August 3, 2026)	Republican	5th–Rocklin
Republican deputy leader (fiscal)	Diane Dixon	Republican	72nd–Newport Beach
Republican deputy leader (policy)	Joe Patterson	Republican	5th–Rocklin
Republican deputy leader (operations)	Juan Alanis	Republican	22nd–Modesto
Republican deputy leader (external relations)	Laurie Davies	Republican	74th–Laguna Niguel
Republican chief whip	Tri Ta (until September 15, 2025)	Republican	70th–Westminster
Republican chief whip	Alexandra Macedo (until August 3, 2026)	Republican	33rd–Tulare
Republican chief whip	David Tangipa (after August 3, 2026)	Republican	8th–Fresno
Republican deputy whip	Alexandra Macedo (until September 16, 2025)	Republican	33rd–Tulare
Republican deputy whip	Heather Hadwick (until September 16, 2025)	Republican	1st–Alturas
Chief Clerk	Sue Parker		
Chief Sergeant-at-Arms	Cheryl Craft		
Chaplain	Vacant		

=== Members ===
District	Name	Party	Residence	Term-limited?	Notes
1	Heather Hadwick	Republican	Dorris		
2	Chris Rogers	Democratic	Santa Rosa		
3	Vacant (Note: Republican James Gallagher resigned on June 9, 2026 after being elected as a member of the US House of Representatives for CA-1 in a special election to succeed Doug LaMalfa after LaMalfa's death on January 6, 2026.)				
4	Cecilia Aguiar-Curry	Democratic	Winters		Majority leader
5	Joe Patterson	Republican	Rocklin		
6	Maggy Krell	Democratic	Sacramento		
7	Josh Hoover	Republican	Folsom		
8	David Tangipa	Republican	Fresno		
9	Heath Flora	Republican	Ripon		Minority leader from September 16, 2025 to August 3, 2026
10	Stephanie Nguyen	Democratic	Elk Grove		
11	Lori Wilson	Democratic	Suisun City		
12	Damon Connolly	Democratic	San Rafael		
13	Rhodesia Ransom	Democratic	Tracy		
14	Buffy Wicks	Democratic	Oakland		
15	Anamarie Avila Farias	Democratic	Martinez		
16	Rebecca Bauer-Kahan	Democratic	Orinda		
17	Matt Haney	Democratic	San Francisco		
18	Mia Bonta	Democratic	Alameda		
19	Catherine Stefani	Democratic	San Francisco		
20	Liz Ortega	Democratic	San Leandro		
21	Diane Papan	Democratic	San Mateo		
22	Juan Alanis	Republican	Modesto		
23	Marc Berman	Democratic	Menlo Park		
24	Alex Lee	Democratic	San Jose		
25	Ash Kalra	Democratic	San Jose		
26	Patrick Ahrens	Democratic	San Jose		
27	Esmeralda Soria	Democratic	Fresno		
28	Gail Pellerin	Democratic	Santa Cruz		
29	Robert A. Rivas	Democratic	Hollister		Speaker of the Assembly
30	Dawn Addis	Democratic	Morro Bay		
31	Joaquin Arambula	Democratic	Fresno		
32	Stan Ellis	Republican	Bakersfield		
33	Alexandra Macedo	Republican	Tulare		
34	Tom Lackey	Republican	Palmdale	Yes	
35	Jasmeet Bains	Democratic	Bakersfield		
36	Jeff Gonzalez	Republican	Indio		
37	Gregg Hart	Democratic	Santa Barbara		
38	Steve Bennett	Democratic	Ventura		
39	Juan Carrillo	Democratic	Palmdale		
40	Pilar Schiavo	Democratic	Chatsworth		
41	John Harabedian	Democratic	Sierra Madre		
42	Jacqui Irwin	Democratic	Thousand Oaks	Yes	
43	Celeste Rodriguez	Democratic	San Fernando		
44	Nick Schultz	Democratic	Burbank		
45	James Ramos	Democratic	Highland		
46	Jesse Gabriel	Democratic	Encino		
47	Greg Wallis	Republican	Bermuda Dunes		
48	Blanca Rubio	Democratic	Baldwin Park		
49	Mike Fong	Democratic	Alhambra		
50	Robert Garcia	Democratic	Rancho Cucamonga		
51	Rick Zbur	Democratic	Los Angeles		
52	Jessica Caloza	Democratic	Los Angeles		
53	Michelle Rodriguez	Democratic	Pomona		
54	Mark Gonzalez	Democratic	Los Angeles		Majority whip
55	Isaac Bryan	Democratic	Jefferson Park		
56	Lisa Calderon	Democratic	Whittier		
57	Sade Elhawary	Democratic	Los Angeles		
58	Leticia Castillo	Republican	Corona		
59	Phillip Chen	Republican	Yorba Linda		
60	Corey Jackson	Democratic	Perris		
61	Tina McKinnor	Democratic	Hawthorne		
62	Jose Solache	Democratic	Lynwood		
63	Natasha Johnson	Republican	Lake Elsinore		
64	Blanca Pacheco	Democratic	Downey		
65	Mike Gipson	Democratic	Carson	Yes	
66	Al Muratsuchi	Democratic	Rolling Hills Estates	Yes	
67	Sharon Quirk-Silva	Democratic	Fullerton	Yes	
68	Avelino Valencia	Democratic	Anaheim		
69	Josh Lowenthal	Democratic	Long Beach		
70	Tri Ta	Republican	Westminster		Minority whip
71	Kate Sanchez	Republican	Trabuco Canyon		
72	Diane Dixon	Republican	Newport Beach		
73	Cottie Petrie-Norris	Democratic	Irvine		
74	Laurie Davies	Republican	Laguna Niguel		
75	Carl DeMaio	Republican	San Diego		
76	Darshana Patel	Democratic	San Diego		
77	Tasha Boerner	Democratic	Encinitas		
78	Chris Ward	Democratic	San Diego		
79	LaShae Sharp-Collins	Democratic	San Diego		
80	David Alvarez	Democratic	San Diego		

== See also ==
- List of California state legislatures
