= Bakersfield City Council =

Governing body in California

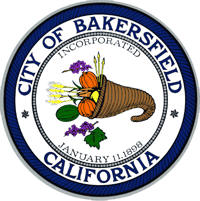

Type
- Type: Unicameral

Leadership
- Mayor: Karen K. Goh, Republican since November 2016
- Vice Mayor: Manpreet Kaur, Democratic

Structure
- Seats: 8
- Political groups: Officially nonpartisan: Republican (4); Democratic (3); Independent (1)
- Length of term: 4 Years

Elections
- Voting system: Single-member districts
- Last election: November 5, 2024
- Next election: November 3, 2026

Meeting place
- Bakersfield City Hall; 1501 Truxtun Ave. Bakersfield, CA 93301

Website
- Official Website

The Bakersfield City Council is the main governing body for Bakersfield, California. Under the council-manager form of government, the city council is the most powerful branch of government. It has seven members who represent seven wards. The city council meetings are presided over by the elected mayor.

== Powers and duties ==
The powers and duties are listed in Article III of the Bakersfield City Charter. Their primary function is the passing of ordinances for: raising revenue, appropriating money from the treasury, and regulations for the city. The specific duties, which ordinances passed to fulfill, are listed in Article III, section 12. There are too many to list here, but generally include all powers a city would need to provide proper services and maintain order for its citizens.

Ordinances are voted on by the city council and a majority vote is needed to pass it. However, approval by the mayor or other officials is not needed for the measure to become active. As a result, any measure with enough votes will become active 30 days after the vote, unless the council votes to repeal it.

Council members are elected to four-year terms. Elections are staggered every two years. As a result, only half of the members are up for reelection during one election cycle.

== Representative districts (wards) ==
City council members are elected from one of seven wards. Each ward is drawn to represent an equal number of citizens. They are redrawn from time to time (typically after the United States Census) to update changes in population and boundaries. Wards are drawn to represent different regions of Bakersfield; however, the boundaries are not exact. This is primarily for two reasons. Bakersfield’s regions have sections that are not a part of the city and do not have representation. Also, each region is not of equal size. For example, the southwest, which is densely populated, requires two wards. The northeast, which is sparsely populated, shares its ward with part of the northwest.

Ward	Councilmember	Neighborhoods and Areas Represented	Party (officially nonpartisan)
Mayor	Karen K. Goh	City Wide	Republican
1	Eric Arias	Southeast	Democratic
2	Andrae Gonzales	Downtown and East Bakersfield	Democratic
3	Ken Weir	Northeast	Republican
4	Bob Smith	Northwest	Independent
5	Larry Koman	Southwest (Seven Oaks)	Republican
6	Zack Bashirtash	Southwest (Stockdale)	Republican
7	Manpreet Kaur (Vice Mayor)	South Bakersfield	Democratic

== Committees ==
The city council has several committees. Each committee examines potential ordinances and issues related to specific topics. Each is made up of three council members, one of which is the chairman.

The committees are:

- Budget & Finance
- Community Services
- Legislative & Litigation
- Personnel
- Planning & Development
- Safe Neighborhoods
- Water Resources
