= Esmeralda Soria =

American politician

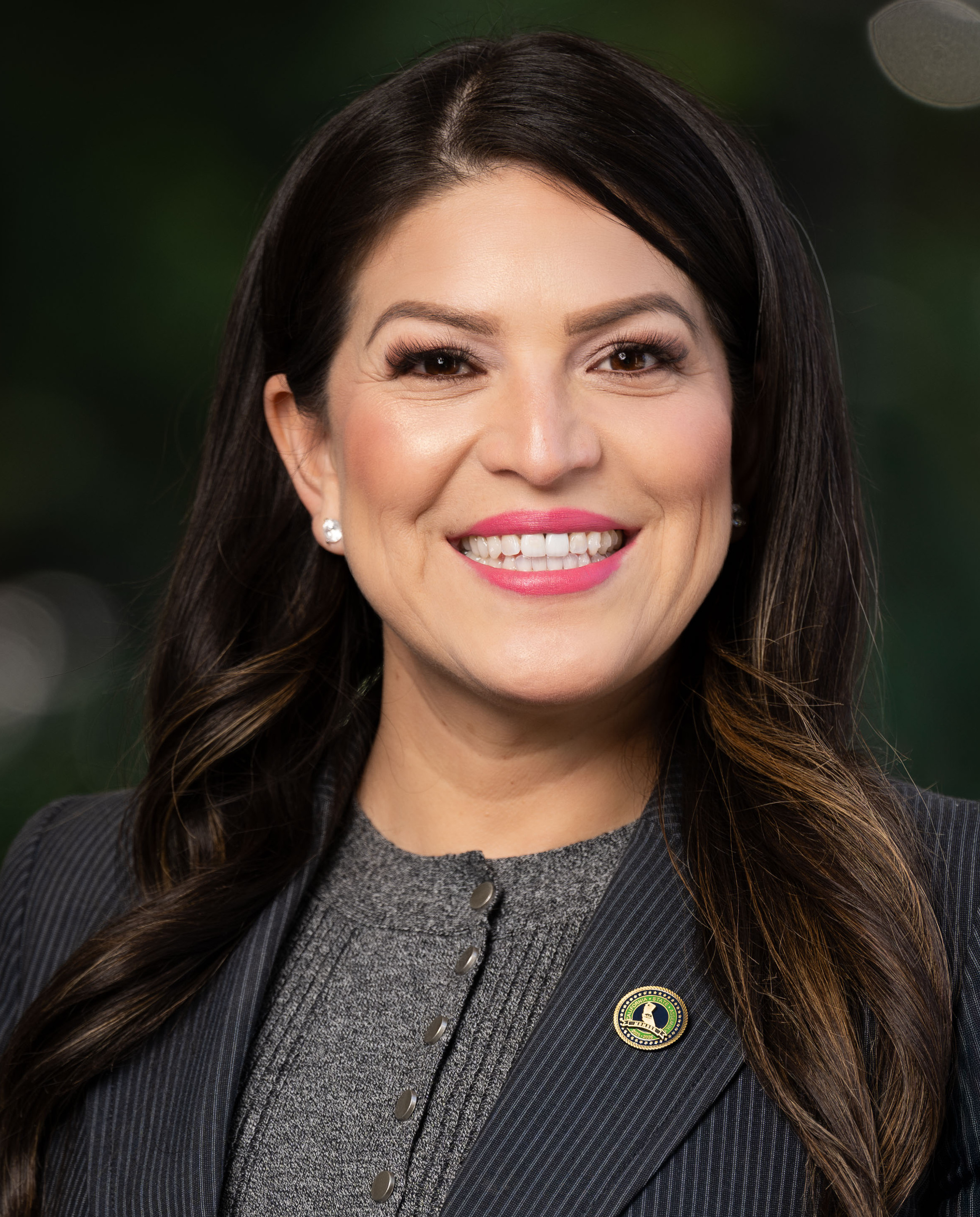

Member of the California State Assembly from the 27th district
- Incumbent
- Assumed office December 5, 2022
- Preceded by: Adam Gray (redistricted)
- Succeeded by: Brian Pacheco (elect)

Member of the Fresno City Council from the 1st district
- In office January 6, 2015 – December 5, 2022
- Preceded by: Blong Xiong
- Succeeded by: Annalisa Perea

Personal details
- Born: April 22, 1982 (age 44) Visalia, California, U.S.
- Party: Democratic
- Spouse: Terance Frazier (m. 2021)
- Education: University of California, Berkeley (BA); University of California, Davis (JD)

Esmeralda Zamudio Soria (born April 22, 1982) is an American politician and adjunct professor who has been serving in the California State Assembly for the 27th district since 2022. Previously, she served as a member of the Fresno City Council from 2015 to 2022, with Soria serving as Council President from 2015 to 2022.

== Early life and education ==
Soria was born and raised in Visalia to two immigrant parents from Michoacán, Mexico. She became interested in politics at a young age as her parents had valued education and giving back to their community. Soria graduated from University of California, Berkeley and University of California, Davis as well as attending Harvard University's Harvard Kennedy School of Executive Leadership Program.

== Political career ==
Soria began working at the California State Capitol after graduating from UC Berkeley and later interned at the White House. Soria was elected to the Fresno City Council in 2014, being the only woman on the council. She was elected president of the Council in 2018, becoming the first Latina council president in Fresno city history.

In 2020, Soria announced that she would challenge moderate Democrat Jim Costa for the U.S. House of Representatives. She stated that she had felt that "nothing had changed" about the problems in Costa's district since his election in 2004. She lost the primary to Costa and Republican Kevin Cookingham.

In 2021, Soria stated that she had been considering running for California State Assembly, as she was set to term out after the end of her term. In January 2022, she launched her campaign for the State Assembly's 27th district. In the election, she and Mark Pazin advanced in the primary, and Soria defeated Pazin in the general election after a tight race.

== Personal life ==
Soria is married to developer Terance Frazier, with the two being married in Sayulita, Mexico.

== Electoral history ==
=== Fresno City Council ===
2014 Fresno City Council 1st district election
Primary election
Candidate	Votes	%
Cary Catalano	2,569	33.91
Esmeralda Soria	2,539	33.52
Rama Dawar	812	10.72
Rebeca A. Rangel	718	9.48
Mark J. Castro	552	7.29
Jackson Shepherd	244	3.22
Lawrence Cano	127	1.68
Write-in	14	0.18
Total votes	7,575	100.00
General election
Esmeralda Soria	5,430	52.41
Cary Catalano	4,896	47.25
Write-in	35	0.34
Total votes	10,361	100.00

2018 Fresno City Council 1st district election
Candidate	Votes	%
Esmeralda Soria	6,357	96.13
Write-in	256	3.87
Total votes	6,613	100.00

=== U.S. House of Representatives ===
2020 California's 16th congressional district primary election
Party	Candidate	Votes	%
Democratic	Jim Costa (incumbent)	41,228	37.5
Republican	Kevin Cookingham	38,652	35.2
Democratic	Esmeralda Soria	23,484	21.4
Democratic	Kimberly Elizabeth Williams	6,458	5.9
Total votes		109,822	100.0

=== California State Assembly ===
2022 California State Assembly 27th district election
Primary election
Party	Candidate	Votes	%
Democratic	Esmeralda Soria	20,395	40.1
Republican	Mark Nicholas Pazin	17,801	35.0
Republican	Amanda Fleming	8,541	16.8
Democratic	Mike Karbassi	4,107	8.1
Libertarian	Randall Pellissier (write-in)	4	0.0
Total votes		50,848	100.0
General election
Democratic	Esmeralda Soria	45,721	51.3
Republican	Mark Nicholas Pazin	43,335	48.7
Total votes		89,056	100.0
Democratic hold			

2024 California State Assembly 27th district election
Primary election
Party	Candidate	Votes	%
Republican	Joanna Garcia Rose	29,457	50.9
Democratic	Esmeralda Soria (incumbent)	28,402	49.1
Total votes		57,859	100.0
General election
Democratic	Esmeralda Soria (incumbent)	75,559	53.9
Republican	Joanna Garcia Rose	64,576	46.1
Total votes		140,135	100.0
Democratic hold			
