= Hipolito Cerros =

American politician

- Official portrait, 2021

Member-elect of the California State Assembly from the 33rd district
- Assuming office December 7, 2026
- Succeeding: Alexandra Macedo

Mayor of Lindsay
- In office December 13, 2022 – February 7, 2024
- Preceded by: Ramona Caudillo
- Succeeded by: Ramona Caudillo

Member of the Lindsay City Council
- In office December 8, 2020 – December 8, 2024

Personal details
- Born: 1997 or 1998 (age 27–28) Lindsay, California
- Party: Democratic
- Education: University of California, Davis (BA)

Hipolito Angel Cerros (born 1997/1998) is an American politician who is a member-elect of the California State Assembly for the 33rd district, a largely rural district based in the San Joaquin Valley. A Democrat, he was elected in 2026 after narrowly defeating incumbent Republican and Minority Leader Alexandra Macedo in an upset. Previously, Cerros served as a council member and mayor of Lindsay, California.

== Background ==
Hipolito Angel Cerros was born and raised in Lindsay, California. He graduated from Lindsay High School followed by the University of California, Davis, where he studied science and technology with a minor in technology management and political science, in 2022. Cerros worked as a senior policy advisor for Dream for America and community outreach specialist for the United We Lead Foundation in 2023, as well as a project intern for the U.S. Conference of Mayors in 2022 and a legislative intern in the California State Senate for Melissa Hurtado in 2022.

While still in college in 2020, Cerros was elected to the city council of Lindsay. At 24 years old, was appointed by the council as the city's youngest mayor in 2022. Cerros was removed from the position by the council in February 2024 due to alleged inexperience, a lack of professionalism, as well as violations of the Brown Act.

== California State Assembly ==
In December 2023, Cerros announced his first campaign for the 33rd district of the California State Assembly in the 2024 election. His stated campaign focuses included improving agri-technology, water infrastructure, and strengthening the workforce. In January 2024, Cerros withdrew from the race but his name remained on the ballot and he placed last of five candidates in the nonpartisan blanket primary.

In 2026, Cerros again ran for the district, challenging incumbent Republican Alexandra Macedo. The Sacramento Bee attributed his unlikely victory to increased turnout and attention for Randy Villegas in the overlapping congressional race. On November 14, 2026, Macedo conceded the race.
