= David Couch (politician) =

American politician

- Official portrait, 2017

Member-elect of the California State Assembly from the 32nd district
- Assuming office December 7, 2026
- Succeeding: Stan Ellis

Member of the Kern County Board of Supervisors from the 4th district
- Incumbent
- Assumed office January 7, 2013
- Preceded by: Ray Watson

Member of the Bakersfield City Council from the 4th ward
- In office 1999–2012
- Preceded by: Kevin McDermott
- Succeeded by: Bob Smith

Personal details
- Born: August 17, 1958 (age 68) Bakersfield, California
- Party: Republican

David Couch is an American politician. A member of the Republican Party, he is the member-elect for the 32nd district of the California State Assembly. He is currently a member of the Kern County Board of Supervisors and a former member of the Bakersfield City Council.
