= Charles Hughes (California politician) =

American politician

Member-elect of the California State Assembly from the 34th district
- Assuming office December 2026
- Succeeding: Tom Lackey

Personal details
- Born: Charles Frederick Hughes
- Party: Republican
- Education: Chapman University
- Website: votecharleshughes.com

Charles Hughes is an American politician from California. A Republican, he is a member-elect of the California State Assembly from the 34th district, after being elected in 2026, to succeed term limited fellow Republican Tom Lackey. Hughes was a board member of Antelope Valley Union High School District.

In the primary, he finished among Republicans with 37% of the vote. In the general election, he defeated Big Bear Lake Mayor Randall Putz.
