= Leila Namvar =

American politician

Member-elect of the California State Assembly from the 47th district
- Assuming office December 7, 2026
- Succeeding: Greg Wallis

Personal details
- Born: August 4, 1972 (age 54) Iran
- Party: Democratic
- Education: California State University, San Bernardino (MPA)

Leila Namvar (born August 4, 1972) is an American labor union organizer and politician from California. A Democrat, she is a member-elect of the California State Assembly from the 47th district, having defeated Republican incumbent Greg Wallis in 2026.

== Early life and education ==
Namvar was born August 4, 1972, and raised in Iran. She earned a bachelor's degree in the country and worked in urban planning in Tehran before immigrating to the U.S. at 30-years old in 2002. Namvar then earned a Master of Public Administration from California State University, San Bernardino.

She began working for the City of Indio in 2005 as a planning technician and currently works as a public arts program analyst. Namvar previously served as president of the SEIU 721 chapter.

== California State Assembly ==
In October 2025, Namvar announced her campaign for the 47th district of the California State Assembly, challenging Republican incumbent Greg Wallis in the 2026 election. She placed second behind Wallis in the nonpartisan primary election.

CalMatters reported that the race had reached $4.7 million in spending by October 2026, with Wallis's campaign outspending Namvar's by a 6-to-1 margin in addition to benefitting from $1.1 million from Meta and Google-funding California Leads as well as $450,000 from a PAC funded by oil and gas companies in independent expenditures; Namvar also benefited from $1.8 million from the California Democratic Party. A week after the general election, Wallis conceded to Namvar.

== Personal life ==
Namvar became a U.S. citizen in 2008. She resides in La Quinta, California, with her husband, an emergency room nurse, and her son, who was training for his emergency medical technician license as of March 2026. Namvar is Muslim.
