= Clarissa Cervantes =

American politician

- Official portrait, 2021

Member-elect of the California State Assembly from the 58th district
- Assuming office December 7, 2026
- Succeeding: Leticia Castillo

Member of the Riverside City Council for the 2nd Ward
- Incumbent
- Assumed office July 13, 2021
- Preceded by: Andy Melendrez

Personal details
- Born: 1990 (age 35–36)
- Party: Democratic
- Children: 1
- Relatives: Sabrina Cervantes (sister)

Clarissa Cervantes (born 1990) is an American politician who is a member-elect of the California State Assembly's 58th district since 2026. The sister of politician Sabrina Cervantes, she (Note: Cervantes uses she and they pronouns.) was previously a member of the Riverside City Council from 2021.

== Political career ==
Prior to her election to the Riverside City Council, she was a field representative for councilmember Andy Melendrez. In 2021, she announced that she would be running for Riverside City Council for the 2nd Ward after Melendrez announced that he would be retiring by the end of the term. She went against five other candidates, and avoided a runoff election after earning 52.06% of the vote. She was sworn in on July 13, 2021, becoming the second Latina and second LGBTQ+ person to be elected to the Riverside City Council. In September 2021, Cervantes filed a libel lawsuit against Riverside County Sheriff Chad Bianco after he claimed that she supported a protest that damaged a city courthouse.

In 2022, Cervantes announced that she would be running to succeed Sabrina's seat in the California State Assembly after Sabrina announced her run for California State Senate. She declared victory over fellow Riverside Councilor Ronaldo Fierro to face her Republican opponent in the general election. She narrowly lost to Republican psychotherapist Leticia Castillo in what was considered a major upset in the Democratic-leaning district. She ran for the Assembly again in 2026, challenging Castillo, and defeated her in the general election.

== Personal life ==
Cervantes identifies as bisexual and queer and has a daughter.

In 2014, Cervantes was arrested for driving under the influence on California State Route 60. She pleaded guilty to charges of having a blood-alcohol level nearly double the legal limit and received a sentence of three years' probation and 10 days of electronic monitoring. She was also ordered to attend a DUI offender's class and was fined $2,541. After having the previous DUI charge dismissed by a judge in 2023, she was arrested again for another DUI weeks later. She pleaded guilty to the misdemeanor two months after her arrest and was placed on summary probation for 36 months.

== Electoral history ==
Electoral history of Kevin Kiley
Year	Office	Party	Primary			General			Result	Swing	Ref.
Year	Office	Party	Total	%	P.	Total	%	P.	Result	Swing	Ref.
2021	Riverside City Council	Nonpartisan	2,627	52.06%	1st	Runoff cancelled			Won	N/A	
2024	California State Assembly	Democratic	15,713	25.87%	2nd	77,696	49.81%	2nd	Lost	Gain	
2026	California State Assembly	Democratic	45,598	54.54%	1st				Won	Gain	
