= Ayanna Davis =

American politician

Member-elect of the California State Assembly from the 65th district
- Assuming office December 7, 2026
- Succeeding: Mike Gipson

Personal details
- Party: Democratic

Ayanna Davis is an American politician. A member of the Democratic Party, she is the member-elect for the 65th district of the California State Assembly. She is currently a member of the Compton School Board.
