= Paul Seo =

American politician

- Official portrait, 2022

Member-elect of the California State Assembly from the 66th district
- Member-elect
- Assuming office December 7, 2026
- Succeeding: Al Muratsuchi

Mayor of Rancho Palos Verdes
- Incumbent
- Assumed office December 2, 2025
- Preceded by: David L. Bradley

Member of the Rancho Palos Verdes City Council
- Incumbent
- Assumed office December 6, 2022
- Preceded by: Ken Dyda

Personal details
- Born: Los Angeles, California, U.S.
- Party: Democratic
- Spouse: Hannah
- Children: 2
- Education: U.S. Military Academy (BS); Loyola Law School (JD)
- Website: Official website

Paul Seo is an American politician who is a member-elect of the California State Assembly, representing the 66th district. He was elected to the State Assembly in the general election on November 3, 2026.

Seo was previously elected to the Rancho Palos Verdes city council in 2022 and was selected as mayor in 2025, becoming the first Asian-American to serve in either post.

Seo was born in the Harbor City neighborhood of Los Angeles to Korean immigrant parents and grew up in Torrance, California, where he graduated from South High School. He earned a bachelor's degree in economics from the United States Military Academy in 2004 and then served with the 2nd Infantry Division in the Joint Security Area of the Korean Demilitarized Zone, reaching the rank of captain. After returning to the U.S., Seo earned his Juris Doctor from Loyola Law School in 2012. He served as a deputy district attorney for Los Angeles County from 2015 to 2021 before joining the California Department of Justice as a deputy attorney general.

Seo resides in Rancho Palos Verdes with his wife Hannah and their two children.
