= Deborah Klein Lopez =

American politician

Member-elect of the California State Assembly from the 42nd district
- Assuming office December 7, 2026
- Succeeding: Jacqui Irwin

Personal details
- Party: Democratic
- Website: deborahkleinlopez.com

Deborah Klein Lopez is an American politician from California. A Democrat, she is a member-elect of the California State Assembly from the 42nd district, after being elected in 2026. She was previously mayor pro-tem of Agoura Hills.
