= Andrae Gonzales =

American politician

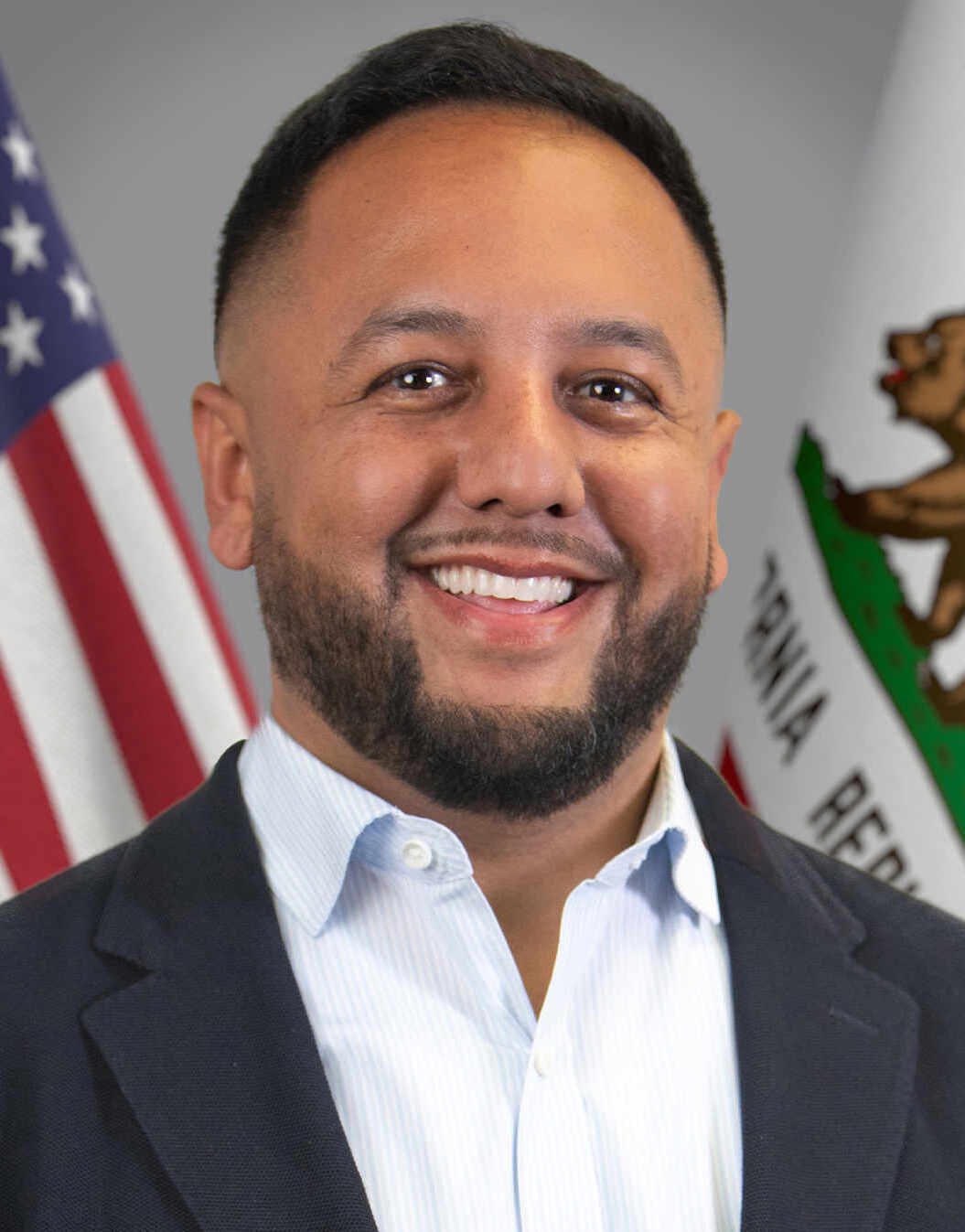
- Official portrait, 2022

Member-elect of the California State Assembly from the 35th district
- Assuming office December 7, 2026
- Succeeding: Jasmeet Bains

Member of the Bakersfield City Council from the 2nd ward
- Incumbent
- Assumed office December 14, 2016
- Preceded by: Terry Maxwell

Personal details
- Party: Democratic

Andrae Gonzales is an American politician who is the Member-elect of the California State Assembly from the 35th district. He is Bakersfield City Councillor from Ward 2 since 2016.
