= Amy Slavensky =

American politician

Member-elect of the California State Assembly from the 7th district
- Assuming office December 7, 2026
- Succeeding: Josh Hoover

Personal details
- Party: Democratic

Amy Slavensky is an American educator and politician. A member of the Democratic Party, she is the member-elect for the 7th district of the California State Assembly.

She is Deputy Superintendent of the San Juan Unified School District and a former Superintendent of the Amador County Unified School District,
