= Ida Obeso-Martinez =

American politician (born 1979)

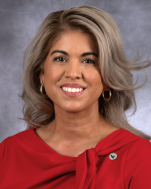
- Official portrait, 2020

Member-elect of the California State Assembly from the 36th district
- Assuming office December 7, 2026
- Succeeding: Jeff Gonzalez

Mayor of Imperial
- Incumbent
- Assumed office December 2024
- Preceded by: Robert Amparano

Member of the Imperial City Council
- Incumbent
- Assumed office December 2022

Personal details
- Born: May 6, 1979 (age 47) Imperial Valley, California, U.S.
- Party: Democratic
- Education: Imperial Valley College; University of Phoenix; University of Arizona (DNP)

Ida Selena Obeso-Martinez (born May 6, 1979) is an American nurse practitioner and politician who is a member-elect of the California State Assembly from the 36th District. A Democrat, she defeated Republican incumbent Jeff Gonzalez in the 2026 election. Obeso-Martinez has served on the city council of Imperial, California, since being elected in November 2022 and is a cardiac nurse practitioner at Imperial Cardiac Center.

== Early life and career ==
Obeso-Martinez was born May 6, 1979, in the Imperial Valley, California. She completed her nursing education at Imperial Valley College and the University of Phoenix before earning a Doctor of Nursing Practice from the University of Arizona. She currently works as a cardiovascular nurse practitioner at the Imperial Cardiac Center

== Political career ==
=== Imperial City Council ===
In November 2022, Obeso-Martinez was elected to the city council of Imperial, California, and sworn in the following month.

=== California State Assembly ===
In October 2025, Obeso-Martinez announced her campaign for the 36th District of the California State Assembly against Republican incumbent Jeff Gonzalez. The district was described as the most competitive seat and she had the backing of U.S. Representative Raul Ruiz. Obeso-Martinez defeated Gonzalez in the general election on November 3, 2026.
