= Dom Belza =

American politician

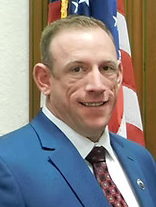
- Belza in 2021

Member-elect of the California State Assembly from the 3rd district
- Assuming office December 7, 2026
- Succeeding: James Gallagher

Member of the Marysville City Council
- In office December 2020 – December 3, 2024
- Succeeded by: Marjorie Rollins

Personal details
- Born: John Dominique Belza
- Party: Republican
- Children: 4
- Website: dombelza.com

John Dominique Belza is an American politician from California. A Republican, he is a member-elect of the California State Assembly from the 3rd district, after being elected in 2026, to succeed fellow Republican James Gallagher. Bela grew up in a fourth-generation Basque American family in North State. He and his wife have four children.

Before being elected to the Assembly, Belza was a member of the Marysville City Council.
