= Paula Swift =

American politician

Member-elect of the California State Assembly from the 70th district
- Assuming office December 7, 2026
- Succeeding: Tri Ta

Personal details
- Born: 1969 or 1970 (age 56–57)
- Party: Democratic
- Children: 3
- Education: Azusa Pacific University (BA); University of Southern California (M, D)

Paula Williams Swift is an American politician. A member of the Democratic Party, she is the member-elect for the 70th district of the California State Assembly. She is the CEO of a consulting firm and an adjunct professor.

== Background ==
Swift earned a Bachelor of Arts from Azusa Pacific University as well as a Master of communication management and Doctorate in organizational change and leadership from the University of Southern California. Swift founded a consulting company and previously worked as a program manager at KidSave International, a nonprofit advocating for older foster care youth, until COVID-19 pandemic-related budget cuts eliminated her position. She has also taught business communication classes as an adjunct professor at Azusa Pacific University.

== California State Assembly ==
In May 2025, Swift announced her campaign for California's 40th congressional district in the 2026 congressional election. Following the passage of Prop 50, she switched to running for the 70th district of the California State Assembly in the 2026 State Assembly election. Her campaign focused on community resource investment, expanding preventative and mental health services, homeownership and stable housing, and lowering costs among other issues. Swift narrowly defeated incumbent Republican assemblymember Tri Ta in the general election.

== Personal life ==
Swift resides in Seal Beach, California, and is the mother of three children. She is a survivor of domestic violence, which pushed her to advocate for other survivors.
