= Sergio Farias (politician) =

American politician

Member-elect of the California State Assembly from the 74th district
- Assuming office December 7, 2026
- Succeeding: Laurie Davies

Personal details
- Party: Democratic

Sergio Farias is an American politician. A member of the Democratic Party, he is a member of the San Juan Capistrano City Council and the member-elect for the 74th district of the California State Assembly.
