= Brian Pacheco =

American politician

Member-elect of the California State Assembly from the 27th district
- Assuming office December 7, 2026
- Succeeding: Esmeralda Soria

Personal details
- Party: Democratic

Brian Pacheco is an American politician. A member of the Democratic Party, he is the member-elect for the 27th district of the California State Assembly. He is a member of the Fresno County Board of Supervisors and a former member of the Kerman School Board.

He grew up on his father's dairy farm. He graduated from Kerman High School and then the University of California, Davis, where he earned a degree in agricultural economics
