= 2026 California State Senate election =

- November 3, 2026

20 seats from even-numbered districts in the California State Senate 21 seats needed for a majority
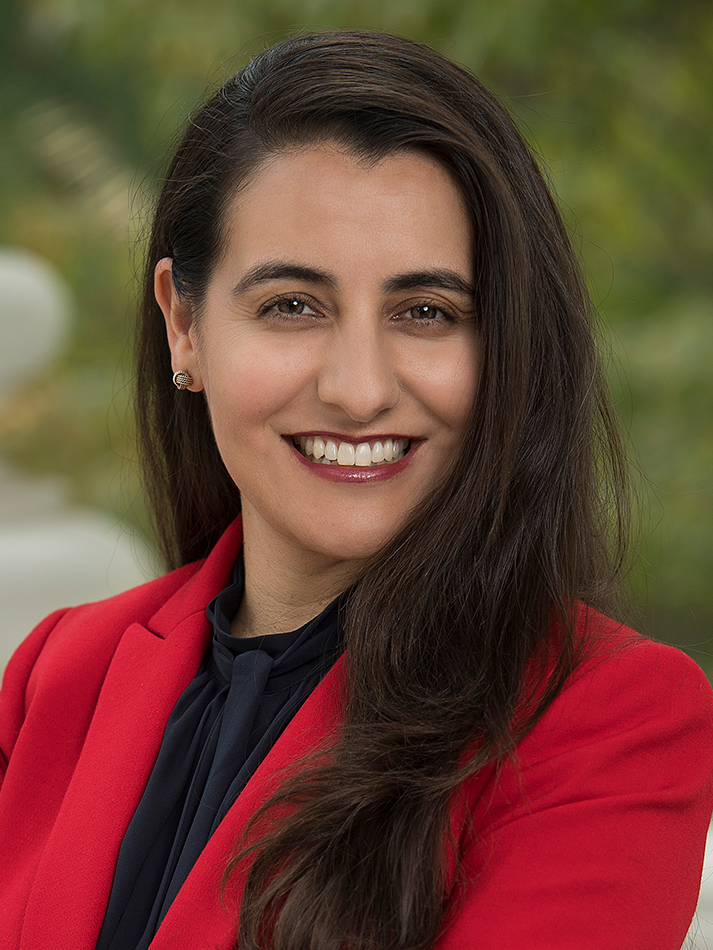

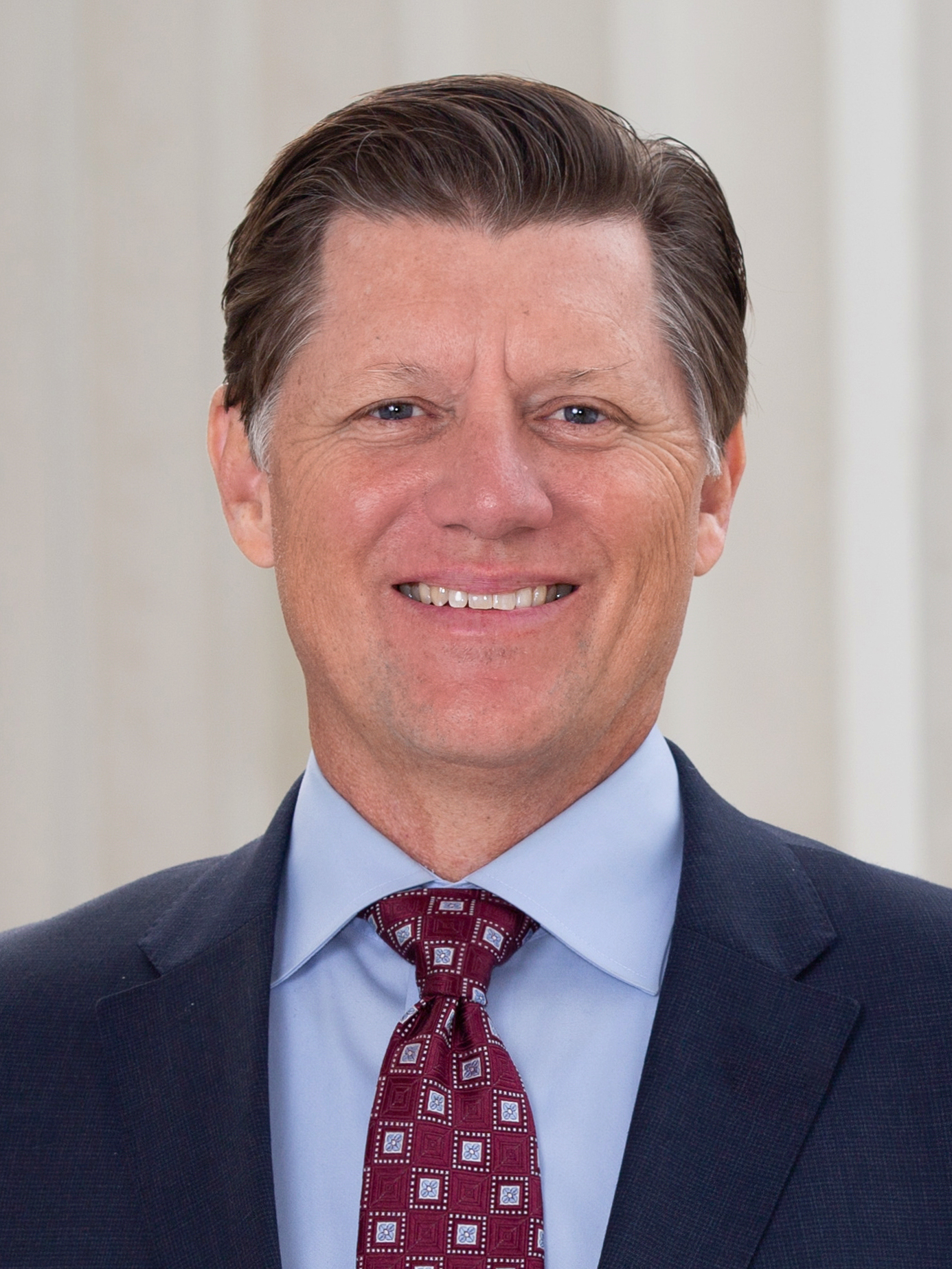
	Majority party	Minority party
Leader	Monique Limón	Brian Jones (term-limited)
Party	Democratic	Republican
Leader since	November 17, 2025	December 5, 2022
Leader's seat	21st–Santa Barbara	40th–Santee
Seats before	30	10
Seats won	16	4
Seats after	32	8
Seat change	▲2	▼2
- Democratic gain Democratic hold Republican hold Result not yet called
President pro tempore before election
Monique Limón
Democratic
Elected President pro tempore
Monique Limón
Democratic

The 2026 California State Senate election was held on November 3, 2026, with the primary election held on June 2. Voters in the 20 even-numbered districts of the California State Senate will elect their representatives to four-year terms. The elections will coincide with elections for other offices, including for governor and the state assembly.

== Outgoing incumbents ==
=== Term-limited or running for other office ===
==== Democrats ====
- 2nd: Mike McGuire was termed out of office and ran for U.S. House.
- 10th: Aisha Wahab ran for U.S. House.
- 14th: Anna Caballero was termed out of office and ran for state treasurer.
- 24th: Ben Allen was termed out of office and ran for insurance commissioner.
- 26th: María Elena Durazo ran for the Los Angeles County Board of Supervisors.
- 34th: Tom Umberg was termed out of office and ran for the State Board of Equalization.

==== Republicans ====
- 12th: Shannon Grove was termed out of office and ran for the State Board of Equalization.
- 40th: Brian Jones was termed out of office.

=== Lost re-election ===
==== Primary election ====
- 4th: Republican Marie Alvarado-Gil lost to Republican Alexandra Duarte and Democrat Jaron Brandon.

==== General election ====
- 36th: Republican Tony Strickland lost to Democrat Chris Duncan.

== Predictions ==
Source	Ranking	As of
Sabato's Crystal Ball	Safe D	January 22, 2026
State Navigate	Safe D	October 14, 2026

== Summary by district ==
† - Incumbent not seeking re-election

District	Incumbent	Party	Elected senator	Party
2nd	Mike McGuire†	Dem	Damon Connolly	Dem
4th	Marie Alvarado-Gil	Rep (Note: Originally elected as a Democrat in 2022, switched parties August 8, 2024.)	Alexandra Duarte	Rep
6th	Roger Niello	Rep	Roger Niello	Rep
8th	Angelique Ashby	Dem	Angelique Ashby	Dem
10th	Aisha Wahab†	Dem	Scott Sakakihara	Dem
12th	Shannon Grove†	Rep	Nathan Magsig	Rep
14th	Anna Caballero†	Dem	Esmeralda Soria	Dem
16th	Melissa Hurtado	Dem	Melissa Hurtado	Dem
18th	Steve Padilla	Dem	Steve Padilla	Dem
20th	Caroline Menjivar	Dem	Caroline Menjivar	Dem
22nd	Susan Rubio	Dem	Susan Rubio	Dem
24th	Ben Allen†	Dem	Brian Goldsmith	Dem
26th	María Elena Durazo†	Dem	Sara Hernandez	Dem
28th	Lola Smallwood-Cuevas	Dem	Lola Smallwood-Cuevas	Dem
30th	Bob Archuleta	Dem	Bob Archuleta	Dem
32nd	Kelly Seyarto	Rep	Kelly Seyarto	Rep
34th	Tom Umberg†	Dem	Avelino Valencia	Dem
36th	Tony Strickland	Rep	Chris Duncan	Dem flip
38th	Catherine Blakespear	Dem	Catherine Blakespear	Dem
40th	Brian Jones†	Rep	Mara Elliott	Dem flip

== District 2 ==
District 2
- November 3, 2026
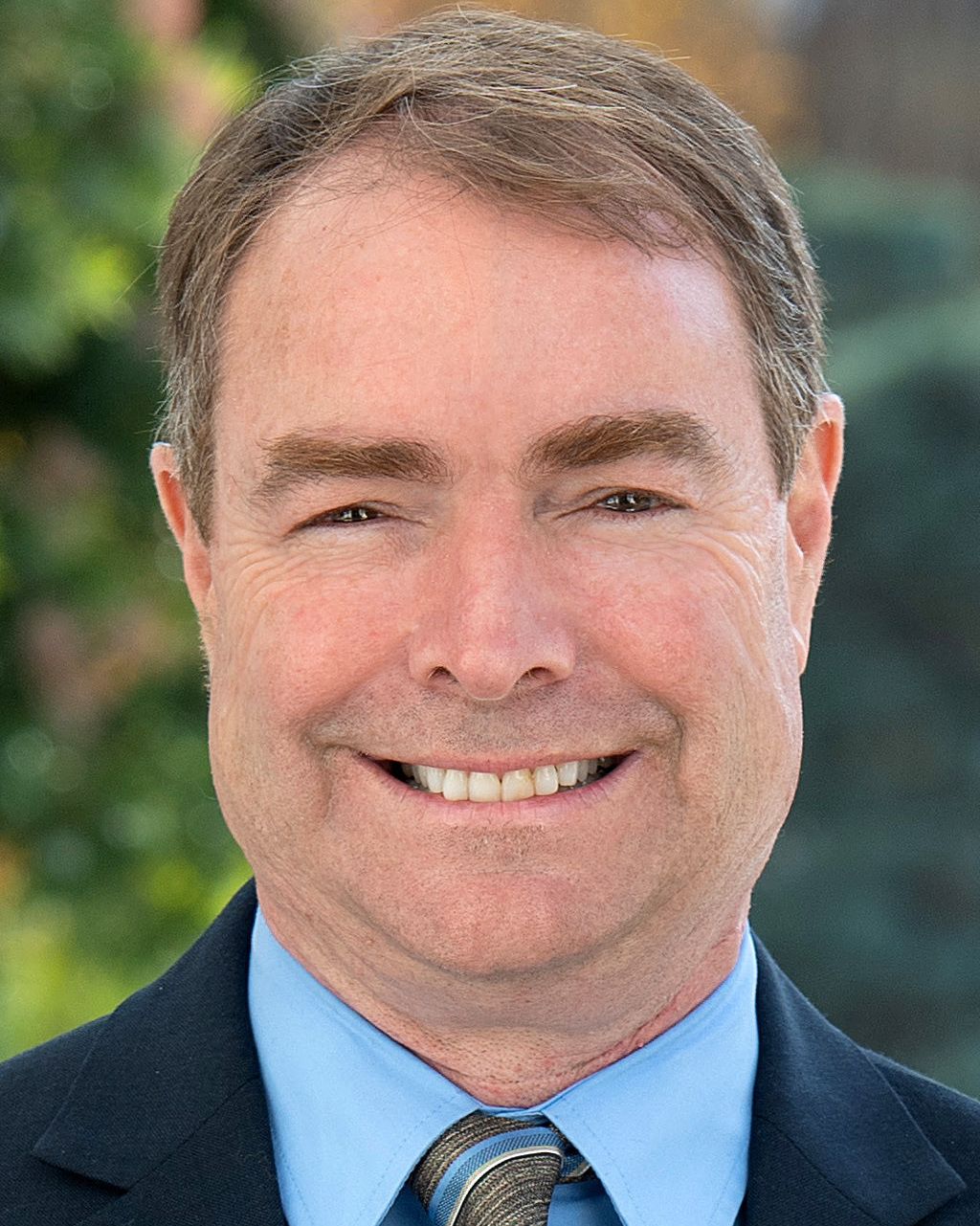

Nominee	Damon Connolly	Tief Gibbs
Party	Democratic	Republican
Popular vote	310,777	105,475
Percentage	74.7%	25.3%
Senator before election
Mike McGuire
Democratic
Elected Senator
Damon Connolly
Democratic

The 2nd district encompasses most of the North Coast region, stretching from the Oregon border to the northern Bay Area to include Del Norte, Humboldt, Trinity, Mendocino, Sonoma, and Marin counties. The incumbent is three-term Democrat Mike McGuire of Healdsburg, who is term-limited and running for the United States House of Representatives.

=== Candidates ===
==== Declared ====
- Damon Connolly (Democratic), state assemblymember from AD-12 (2022–present)
- Tief Gibbs (Republican), office manager and candidate for California's 2nd congressional district in 2024
- Aaron Smith (Republican)

==== Withdrawn ====
- James Gore (Democratic), Sonoma County supervisor (2015–present)
- Natalie Rogers (Democratic), Santa Rosa city councilor (2020–present)

==== Declined ====
- Ariel Kelley (Democratic), Healdsburg city councilor and candidate for California's 2nd State Assembly district in 2024

=== Endorsements ===
Damon Connolly (D)

U.S. representatives

- Jared Huffman, CA-02 (2013–present)

Statewide officials

- Rob Bonta, attorney general of California (2021–present)

State legislators

- Wesley Chesbro, state senator from the 2nd district (1998–2006) and state assemblymember from the 1st district (2008–2012) and the 2nd district (2012–2014)
- Mike McGuire, state senator from the 2nd district (2014–present)
- Chris Rogers, state assemblymember from the 2nd district (2024–present)

Labor unions

- Association of California State Supervisors
- California Faculty Association
- California Federation of Teachers
- California Labor Federation
- California Nurses Association
- California School Employees Association
- California State Retirees
- National Union of Healthcare Workers
- North Bay Building Trades
- SEIU California
- SEIU UHW
- Teamsters Joint Council 7
- United Auto Workers National and Region 6 CA
- United Food and Commercial Workers Western States Council

Organizations

- California Environmental Voters
- California College Democrats
- California YIMBY
- California Young Democrats
- Center for Biological Diversity Action Fund
- Equality California
- Jane Fonda Climate PAC
- Moms Demand Action
- Sierra Club Redwood

Political parties

- California Democratic Party
- California Working Families Party
- Lake County Democratic Party

Newspapers

- Marin Independent Journal
- The Press Democrat

Government bodies

- Arcata City Council

=== Results ===
2026 California's 2nd State Senate district election
Primary election
Party	Candidate	Votes	%
Democratic	Damon Connolly	232,240	73.38
Republican	Tief Gibbs	51,149	16.16
Republican	Aaron Smith	33,112	10.46
Total votes		316,501	100.0
General election
Democratic	Damon Connolly	310,777	74.66
Republican	Tief Gibbs	105,475	25.34
Total votes		416,252	100.0
Democratic hold			

== District 4 ==
District 4
- November 3, 2026

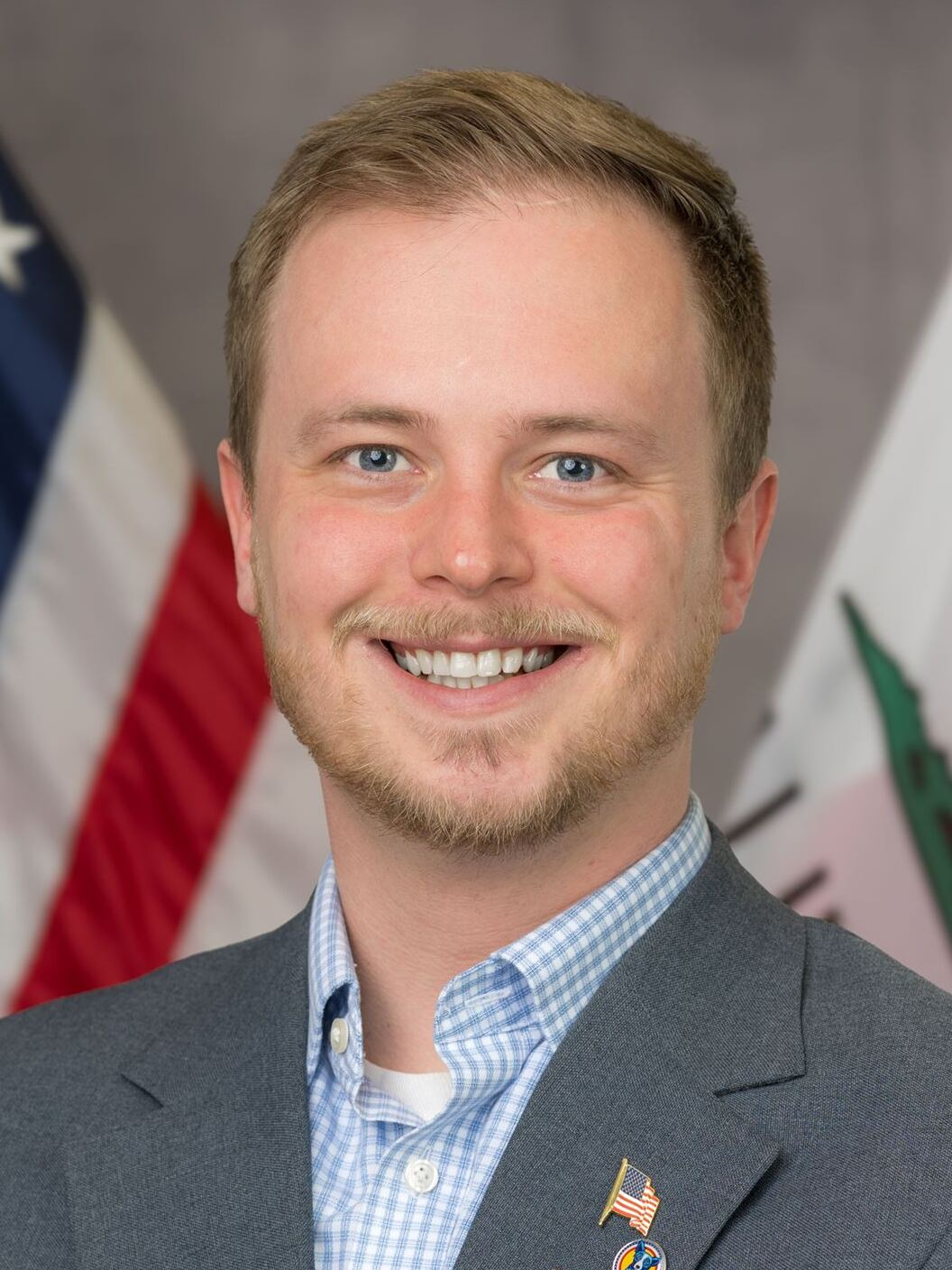
Nominee	Alexandra Duarte	Jaron Brandon
Party	Republican	Democratic
Popular vote	196,568	182,677
Percentage	51.8%	48.2%
Senator before election
Marie Alvarado-Gil
Republican
Elected Senator
Alexandra Duarte
Republican

The 4th district is located in the northeastern Central Valley, the central Sierra Nevada, and Death Valley, including Stanislaus, Calaveras, Amador, El Dorado, Placer, Alpine, Tuolumne, Mariposa, Madera, Mono, and Inyo counties. The incumbent is one-term Republican Marie Alvarado-Gil of Jackson, who was elected with 52.7% of the vote in 2024. Alvarado-Gil did not advance to the general election after being eliminated in the jungle primary by Democrat Tuolumne County Supervisor Jaron Brandon and Republican almond farmer Alexandra Duarte.

=== Candidates ===
==== Advanced to general ====
- Jaron Brandon (Democratic), Tuolumne County supervisor (2020–present)
- Alexandra Duarte (Republican), pistachio farmer and wife of former U.S. Representative John Duarte

==== Eliminated in primary ====
- Marie Alvarado-Gil (Republican), incumbent state senator (2022–present)

==== Withdrawn ====
- Jeramy Young (Republican), Livermore chief of police and former mayor of Hughson (2016–2020) (endorsed Duarte)

=== Endorsements ===
Jaron Brandon (D)

Political parties

- California Democratic Party

Newspapers

- The Sacramento Bee
Alexandra Duarte (R)

Local officials

- Jeramy Young, former mayor of Hughson and former candidate for this seat

=== Results ===
2026 California's 4th State Senate district election
Primary election
Party	Candidate	Votes	%
Democratic	Jaron Brandon	109,094	41.33
Republican	Alexandra Duarte	84,630	32.06
Republican	Marie Alvarado-Gil (incumbent)	70,217	26.60
Total votes		263,941	100.0
General election
Republican	Alexandra Duarte	196,568	51.83
Democratic	Jaron Brandon	182,677	48.17
Total votes		379,245	100.0
Republican hold			

== District 6 ==
District 6
- November 3, 2026
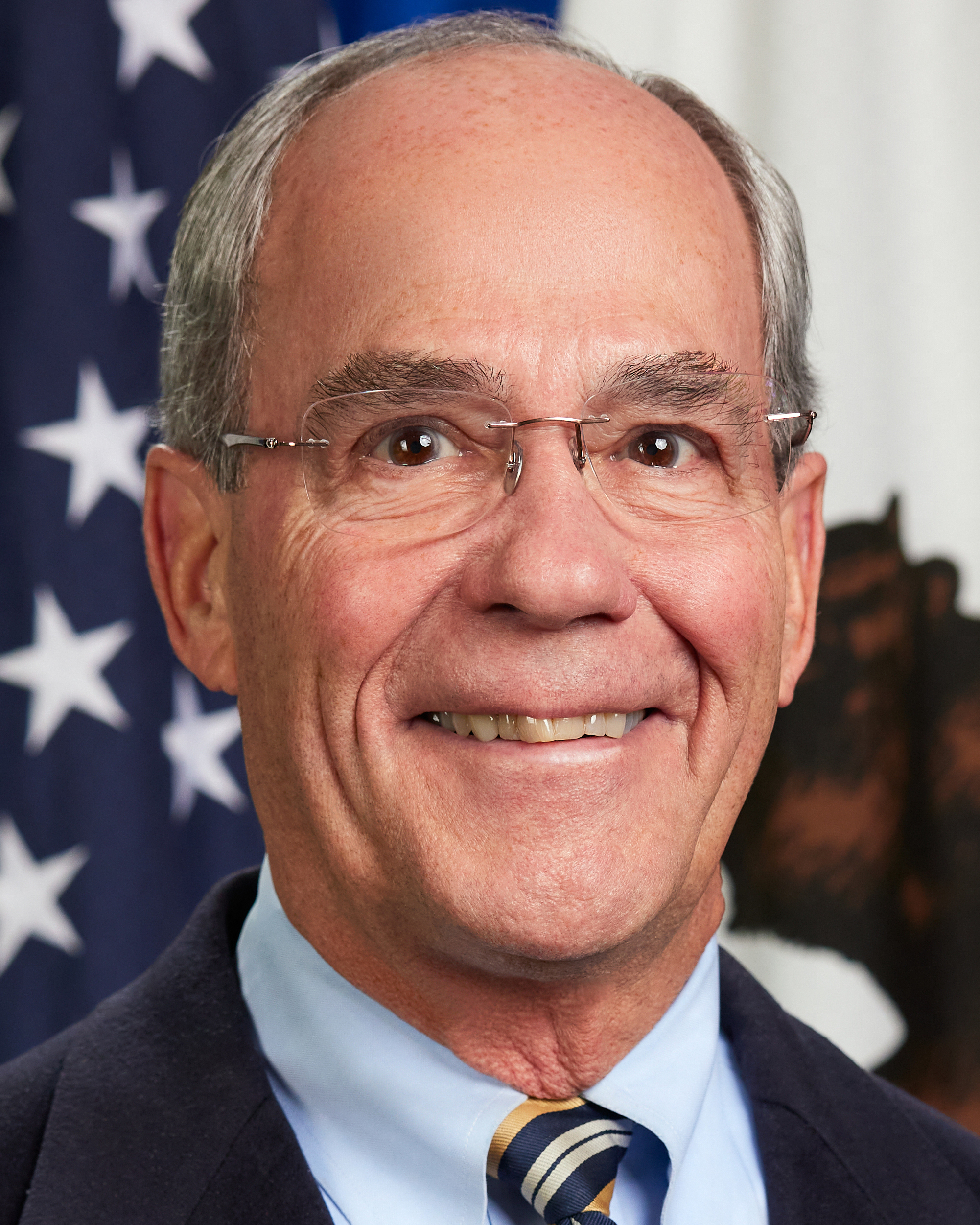

Nominee	Roger Niello	Sean Frame
Party	Republican	Democratic
Popular vote	200,295	195,156
Percentage	50.6%	49.4%
Senator before election
Roger Niello
Republican
Elected Senator
Roger Niello
Republican

The 6th district is located in northern and eastern suburbs of the Sacramento metropolitan area, including the Sacramento County cities of Rancho Cordova, Carmichael, Fair Oaks, Gold River, Arden-Arcade, Folsom, Orangevale, Citrus Heights, and Antelope, and the western Placer County exurbs of Granite Bay, Roseville, Rocklin, Loomis, Whitney, and Lincoln. The incumbent is one-term Republican Roger Niello of Fair Oaks, who is eligible to run for re-election.

=== Candidates ===
==== Declared ====
- Sean Frame (Democratic), former Placerville Union School District trustee and candidate for California's 6th State Assembly district in 2024
- Roger Niello (Republican), incumbent state senator
- Sara Velasco (Democratic)

=== Endorsements ===
Sean Frame (D)

Political parties

- California Working Families Party
Roger Niello (R)

Newspapers

- The Sacramento Bee

=== Results ===
2026 California's 6th State Senate district election
Primary election
Party	Candidate	Votes	%
Republican	Roger Niello (incumbent)	160,336	56.19
Democratic	Sean Frame	81,323	28.50
Democratic	Sara Velasco	43,708	15.32
Total votes		285,367	100.0
General election
Republican	Roger Niello (incumbent)	200,295	50.65
Democratic	Sean Frame	195,156	49.35
Total votes		395,451	100.0
Republican hold			

== District 8 ==
District 8
- November 3, 2026
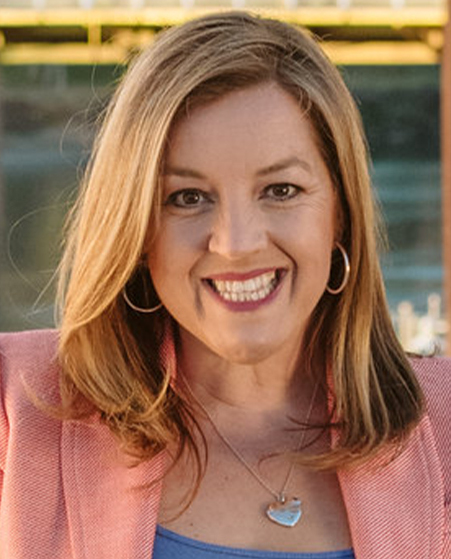

Nominee	Angelique Ashby	Susan Mason
Party	Democratic	Republican
Popular vote	222,220	76,035
Percentage	74.5%	25.5%
Senator before election
Angelique Ashby
Democratic
Elected Senator
Angelique Ashby
Democratic

The 8th district is located in the core of the Sacramento metropolitan area, consisting of the state capital of Sacramento and surrounding suburbs, including Rio Linda, McClellan Park, North Highlands, Vineyard, Rosemont, Florin, and Elk Grove. The incumbent is one-term Democrat Angelique Ashby of Sacramento, who is eligible to run for re-election.

=== Candidates ===
==== Declared ====
- Angelique Ashby (Democratic), incumbent state senator
- Susan Mason (Republican), retired nurse
- Linda Roberts (Peace and Freedom)

=== Endorsements ===
Angelique Ashby (D)

Political parties

- California Democratic Party

Newspapers

- The Sacramento Bee

=== Results ===
2026 California's 8th State Senate district election
Primary election
Party	Candidate	Votes	%
Democratic	Angelique Ashby (incumbent)	138,974	68.10
Republican	Susan A. Mason	55,573	27.23
Peace and Freedom	Linda "LR" Roberts	9,538	4.67
Total votes		204,085	100.0
General election
Democratic	Angelique Ashby (incumbent)	222,220	74.51
Republican	Susan Mason	76,035	25.49
Total votes		298,255	100.0
Democratic hold			

== District 10 ==
District 10
- November 3, 2026
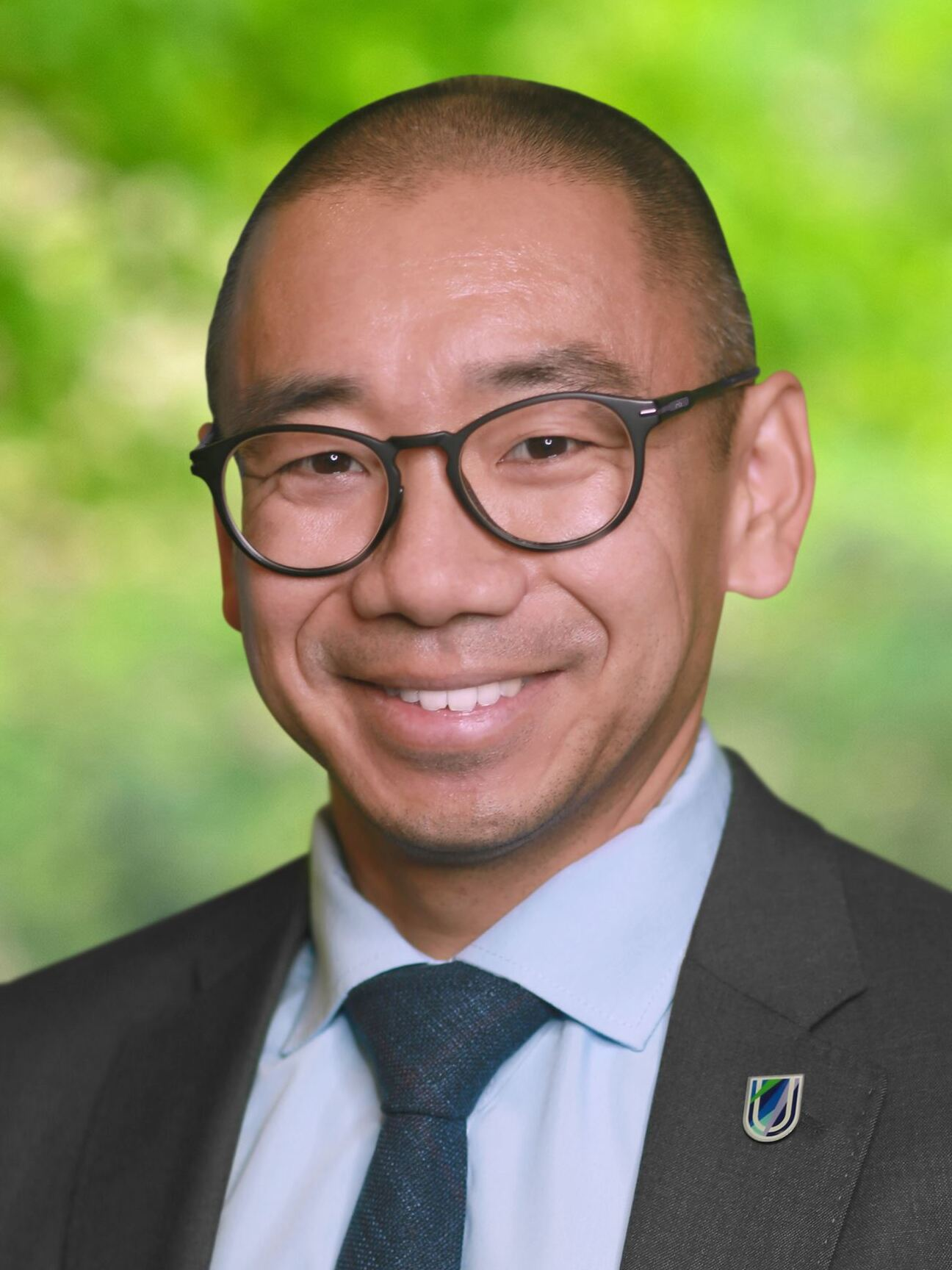

Nominee	Scott Sakakihara	Linda Price
Party	Democratic	Republican
Popular vote	208,316	70,964
Percentage	74.6%	25.4%
Senator before election
Aisha Wahab
Democratic
Elected Senator
Scott Sakakihara
Democratic

The 10th district is located in the East Bay in Alameda County and the northwestern corner of Silicon Valley in Santa Clara County, including Fremont, Hayward, Union City, Newark, Milpitas, Sunnyvale, and Santa Clara. The incumbent is one-term Democrat Aisha Wahab of Hayward, who is eligible to run for re-election, but has chosen to run for California's 14th congressional district instead.

=== Candidates ===
==== Declared ====
- David Cohen (Democratic), San Jose city councilmember
- Anne Kepner (Democratic), West Valley–Mission Community College District trustee
- Raymond Liu (Democratic), Fremont city councilor
- Carmen Montano (Democratic), mayor of Milpitas
- Linda Price (Republican), businesswoman
- Scott Sakakihara (Democratic), Union City councilmember

==== Declined ====
- Alex Lee (Democratic), state assemblymember from AD-24 (2022–present) (running for re-election)
- Aisha Wahab (Democratic), incumbent state senator (running for U.S. House)

=== Endorsements ===
David Cohen (D)

U.S. representatives

- Ro Khanna, CA-17 (2017–present) (co-endorsement with Montano)
- Sam Liccardo, CA-16 (2025–present)
- Zoe Lofgren, CA-18 (1995–present)

State legislators

- Josh Becker, SD-13 (2020–present)
- Josh Newman, SD-29 (2016–2018, 2020–2024)

Organizations

- 350 Bay Area Action
- California Environmental Voters (co-endorsement with Kepner)
- Center for Biological Diversity Action Fund

Newspapers

- Bay Area Reporter
- East Bay Times
- The Mercury News
Anne Kepner (D)

State legislators

- Liz Ortega, AD-20 (2022–present)

Labor unions

- AFL-CIO Alameda County
- AFL-CIO South Bay Labor Council
- California Faculty Association
- California Labor Federation
- California Nurses Association
- California School Employees Association
- California Teachers Association
- IBEW Local 332
- SEIU California and Local 521
- SEIU UHW
- United Food and Commercial Workers Western States Council

Organizations

- California Environmental Voters (co-endorsement with Cohen)
- Council on American–Islamic Relations Action
- Moms Demand Action (co-endorsement with Montano and Sakakihara)
Raymond Liu (D)

Individuals

- Abobaker Mojadidi, Muslim activist
Carmen Montano (D)

U.S. representatives

- Ro Khanna, CA-17 (2017–present) (co-endorsement with Cohen)

Local officials

- Jose Esteves, former mayor of Milpitas (2002–2008, 2010–2016) (Republican)

Labor unions

- IAFF Local 1699

Organizations

- Moms Demand Action (co-endorsement with Kepner and Sakakihara)
Scott Sakakihara (D)

U.S. representatives

- Mike Honda, former CA-17 (2001–2017)
- Mark Takano, CA-39 (2013–present)
- Jill Tokuda, HI-02 (2023–present)

State legislators

- Jessica Caloza, AD-52 (2024–present)
- Mike Fong, AD-49 (2022–present)
- Stephanie Nguyen, AD-10 (2022–present)
- Phil Ting, former AD-20 (2012–2024)

Local officials

- David Chiu, San Francisco city attorney (2021–present)
- Adena Ishii, mayor of Berkeley (2024–present)

Labor unions

- IAFF Local 55
- Teamsters Joint Council 7

Organizations

- Moms Demand Action (co-endorsement with Kepner and Montano)
Declined to endorse

Political parties

- California Democratic Party

=== Results ===
2026 California's 10th State Senate district election
Primary election
Party	Candidate	Votes	%
Democratic	Scott Sakakihara	52,762	29.08
Republican	Linda R. Price	42,079	23.20
Democratic	Anne Kepner	27,752	15.30
Democratic	David Cohen	27,059	14.92
Democratic	Carmen Montano	17,284	9.53
Democratic	Raymond Liu	14,477	7.98
Total votes		181,413	100.0
General election
Democratic	Scott Sakakihara	208,316	74.59
Republican	Linda Price	70,964	25.41
Total votes		279,280	100.0
Democratic hold			

== District 12 ==
District 12
- November 3, 2026

Nominee	Nathan Magsig	William Brown Jr.
Party	Republican	Libertarian
Popular vote	193,425	121,829
Percentage	61.4%	38.6%
Senator before election
Shannon Grove
Republican
Elected Senator
Nathan Magsig
Republican

The 12th district encompasses the southeastern Central Valley and the northwestern corner of the Mojave Desert, including most of Kern County and the eastern portions of Tulare County and Fresno County. The incumbent is two-term Republican Shannon Grove of Bakersfield, who is term-limited and running for the California State Board of Equalization.

=== Candidates ===
==== Declared ====
- William Brown (Libertarian), clinical social worker
- Nathan Magsig (Republican), Fresno County supervisor and candidate for California's 5th congressional district in 2022
- Louis Anthony Miramontes (Republican), mechanic

==== Withdrawn ====
- Michael Maher (Republican), aviation business owner and runner-up for California's 21st congressional district in 2022 and 2024

=== Endorsements ===
Nathan Magsig (R)

Newspapers

- The Bakersfield Californian

=== Results ===
2026 California's 12th State Senate district election
Primary election
Party	Candidate	Votes	%
Republican	Nathan Magsig	122,702	59.49
Libertarian	William Brown Jr.	54,728	26.53
Republican	Louis Anthony Miramontes	28,839	13.98
Total votes		206,269	100.0
General election
Republican	Nathan Magsig	193,425	61.36
Libertarian	William Brown	121,829	38.64
Total votes		315,254	100.0
Republican hold			

== District 14 ==
District 14
- November 3, 2026
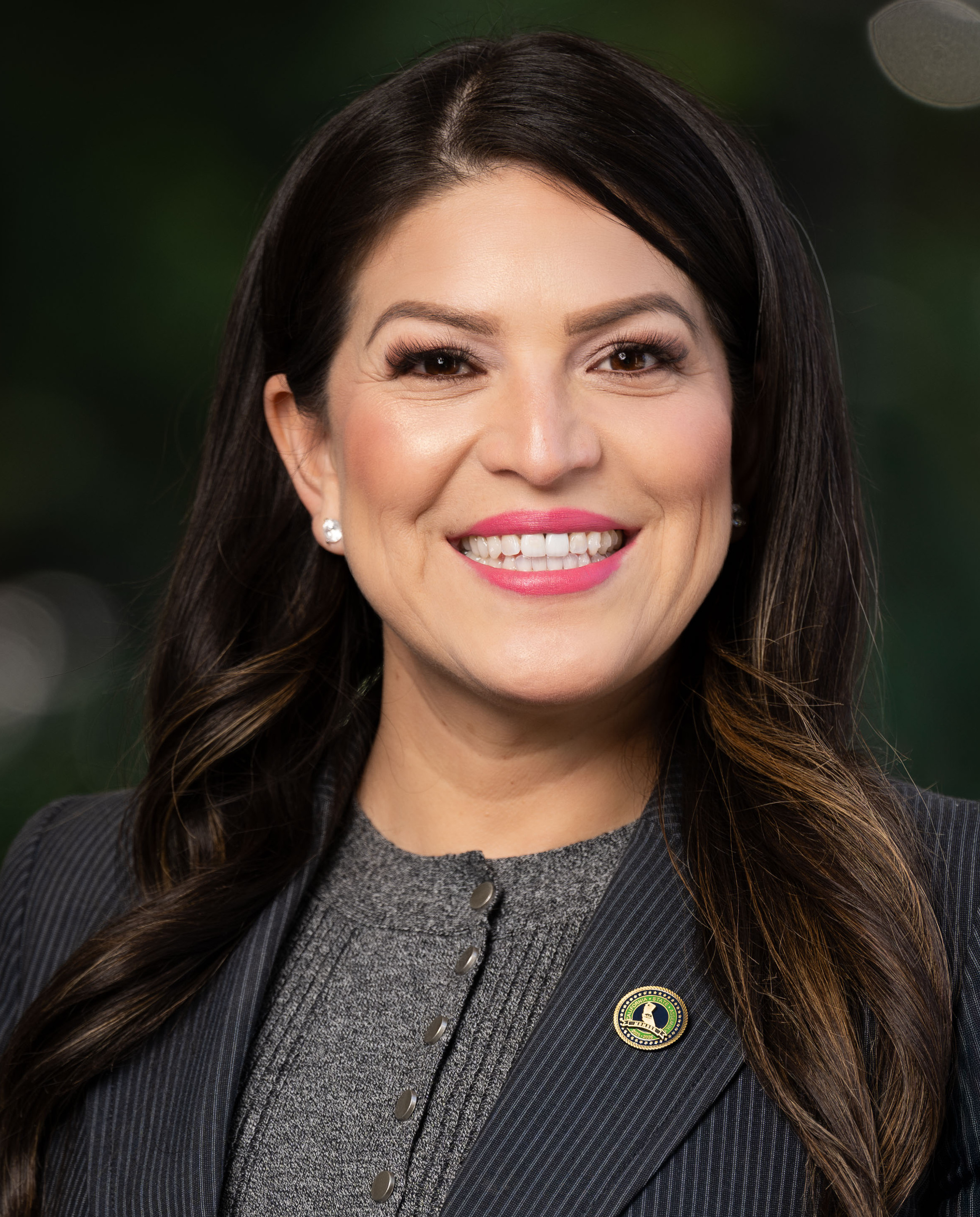

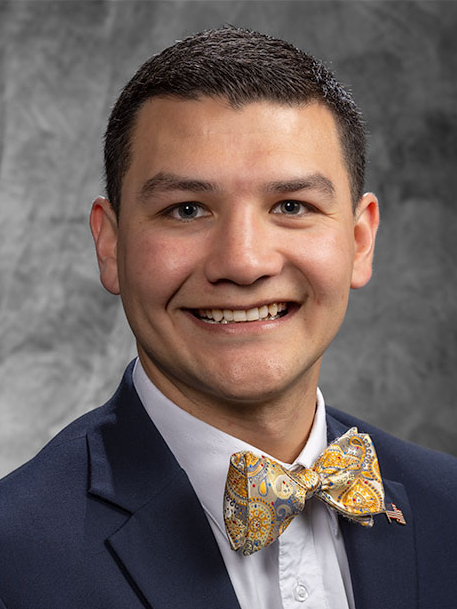
Nominee	Esmeralda Soria	Darin DuPont
Party	Democratic	Republican
Popular vote	146,656	74,860
Percentage	66.2%	33.8%
Senator before election
Anna Caballero
Democratic
Elected Senator
Esmeralda Soria
Democratic

The 14th district is located in the western Central Valley, including Merced County and western Fresno County. The incumbent is two-term Democrat Anna Caballero of Merced, who is term-limited and running for state treasurer.

=== Candidates ===
==== Declared ====
- Darin DuPont (Republican), Merced city councilmember (2024–present)
- Esmeralda Hurtado (Democratic), Sanger city councilmember (2019–present) and sister of state senator Melissa Hurtado
- Esmeralda Soria (Democratic), state assemblymember from the 27th district (2022–present)

==== Withdrawn ====
- Nelson Esparza, Fresno city councilor (2019–present) (endorsed Soria)

=== Endorsements ===
Esmeralda Soria (D)

State legislators

- Anna Caballero, incumbent state senator

Local officials

- Nelson Esparza, Fresno city councilor (2019–present)

Political parties

- California Democratic Party
Nelson Esparza (D) (withdrawn)

U.S. representatives

- Jim Costa, CA-21 (2005–present)
- Adam Gray, CA-13 (2025–present)

Municipal officials

- Jerry Dyer, mayor of Fresno (2021–present) (Republican)

=== Results ===
2026 California's 14th State Senate district election
Primary election
Party	Candidate	Votes	%
Democratic	Esmeralda Soria	59,522	45.82
Republican	Darin S. DuPont	52,440	40.37
Democratic	Esmeralda Hurtado	17,946	13.81
Total votes		129,908	100.0
General election
Democratic	Esmeralda Soria	146,656	66.21
Republican	Darin DuPont	74,860	33.79
Total votes		221,516	100.0
Democratic hold			

== District 16 ==
District 16
- November 3, 2026
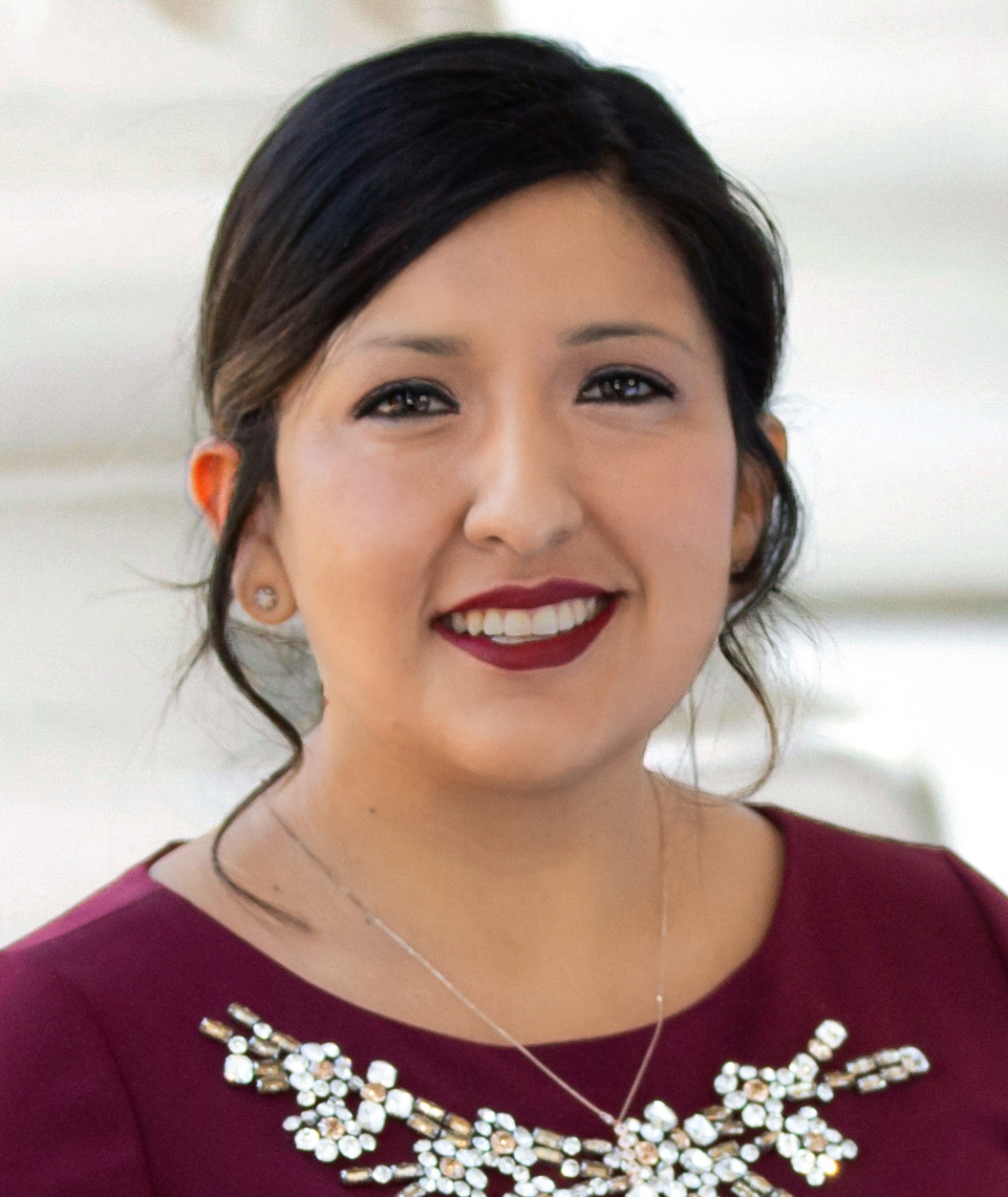

Nominee	Melissa Hurtado	Guillermo Gonzalez
Party	Democratic	Republican
Popular vote	121,557	72,377
Percentage	62.7%	37.3%
Senator before election
Melissa Hurtado
Democratic
Elected Senator
Melissa Hurtado
Democratic

The 16th district encompasses the southwestern Central Valley, including Kings County, western Tulare County, and northwestern Kern County. The incumbent is two-term Democrat Melissa Hurtado of Bakersfield, who is eligible to run for re-election.

=== Candidates ===
==== Declared ====
- Guillermo Gonzalez (Republican), congressional aide and businessman
- Melissa Hurtado (Democratic), incumbent state senator
- Manpreet Kaur (Democratic), vice mayor of Bakersfield

=== Endorsements ===
Manpreet Kaur (D)

Organizations

- Courage California

Political parties

- California Working Families Party

Newspapers

- The Bakersfield Californian (co-endorsement with Hurtado)
Melissa Hurtado (D)

Political parties

- California Democratic Party

Newspapers

- The Bakersfield Californian (co-endorsement with Kaur)

=== Post-primary endorsements ===
Melissa Hurtado (D)

Executive branch officials

- Xavier Becerra, former secretary of health and human services (2021–2025) and former California Attorney General (2017–2021)

=== Results ===
2026 California's 16th State Senate district election
Primary election
Party	Candidate	Votes	%
Republican	Guillermo Asuncion Gonzalez	48,434	45.24
Democratic	Melissa Hurtado (incumbent)	38,123	35.61
Democratic	Manpreet Kaur	20,492	19.14
Total votes		107,049	100.0
General election
Democratic	Melissa Hurtado (incumbent)	121,557	62.68
Republican	Guillermo Gonzalez	72,377	37.32
Total votes		193,934	100.0
Democratic hold			

== District 18 ==
District 18
- November 3, 2026
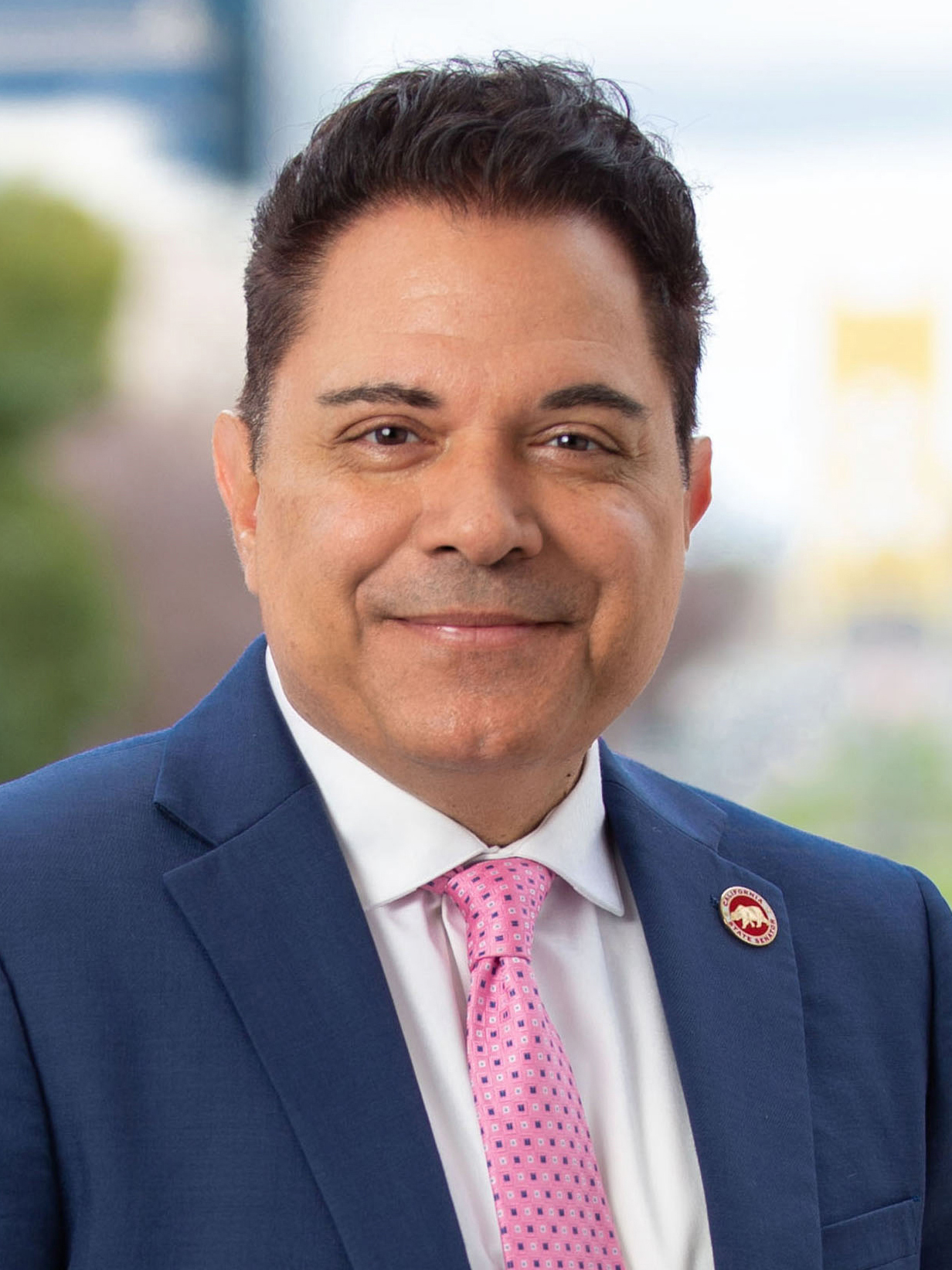

Nominee	Steve Padilla	Art Hodges
Party	Democratic	Republican
Popular vote	186,077	81,246
Percentage	69.6%	30.4%
Senator before election
Steve Padilla
Democratic
Elected Senator
Steve Padilla
Democratic

The 18th district stretches along the Mexico–United States border and includes rural Imperial Valley and areas of California along the Colorado River, including Needles, Blythe and Indio, but most of the population is in southern San Diego County, including Imperial Beach, Otay Mesa, Chula Vista, National City, Lincoln Acres, Bonita, the Tijuana River Valley, and the southeast side of San Diego. The incumbent is one-term Democrat Steve Padilla of Chula Vista, who is eligible for re-election.

=== Candidates ===
==== Declared ====
- Art "Bishop" Hodges (Republican), pastor
- Steve Padilla (Democratic), incumbent state senator

=== Endorsements ===
Steve Padilla (D)

Organizations

- Center for Biological Diversity Action Fund

Political parties

- California Democratic Party

=== Results ===
2026 California's 18th State Senate district election
Primary election
Party	Candidate	Votes	%
Democratic	Steve Padilla (incumbent)	102,089	63.84
Republican	Art Hodges	57,835	36.16
Total votes		159,924	100.0
General election
Democratic	Steve Padilla (incumbent)	186,077	69.61
Republican	Art Hodges	81,246	30.39
Total votes		267,323	100.0
Democratic hold			

== District 20 ==
District 20
- November 3, 2026
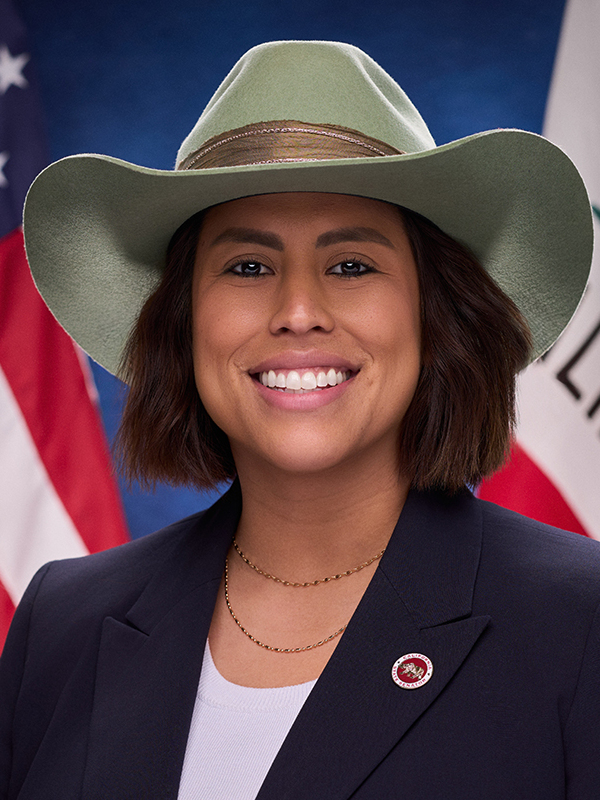

Nominee	Caroline Menjivar	Tony Rodriguez
Party	Democratic	Republican
Popular vote	183,889	56,517
Percentage	76.5%	23.5%
Senator before election
Caroline Menjivar
Democratic
Elected Senator
Caroline Menjivar
Democratic

The 20th district contains most of the San Fernando Valley section of northern Los Angeles County, including the cities of Burbank, San Fernando and the Los Angeles neighborhoods of Van Nuys, Tarzana, Reseda, Canoga Park, Tujunga, Sun Valley, Shadow Hills, Lake View Terrace, Arleta, Panorama City, Pacoima, Mission Hills, and Sylmar. The incumbent is one-term Democrat Caroline Menjivar of Panorama City, who is eligible for reelection.

=== Candidates ===
==== Declared ====
- Roberto David LaCarra (Democratic), Los Angeles Valley College professor
- Caroline Menjivar (Democratic), incumbent state senator
- Tony Rodriguez (Republican)

=== Endorsements ===
Caroline Menjivar (D)

Political parties

- California Democratic Party
- California Working Families Party

=== Results ===
2026 California's 20th State Senate district election
Primary election
Party	Candidate	Votes	%
Democratic	Caroline Menjivar (incumbent)	97,191	62.05
Republican	Tony Rodriguez	43,622	27.85
Democratic	Roberto David LaCarra	15,832	10.11
Total votes		156,645	100.0
General election
Democratic	Caroline Menjivar (incumbent)	183,889	76.49
Republican	Tony Rodriguez	56,517	23.51
Total votes		240,406	100.0
Democratic hold			

== District 22 ==
District 22
- November 3, 2026
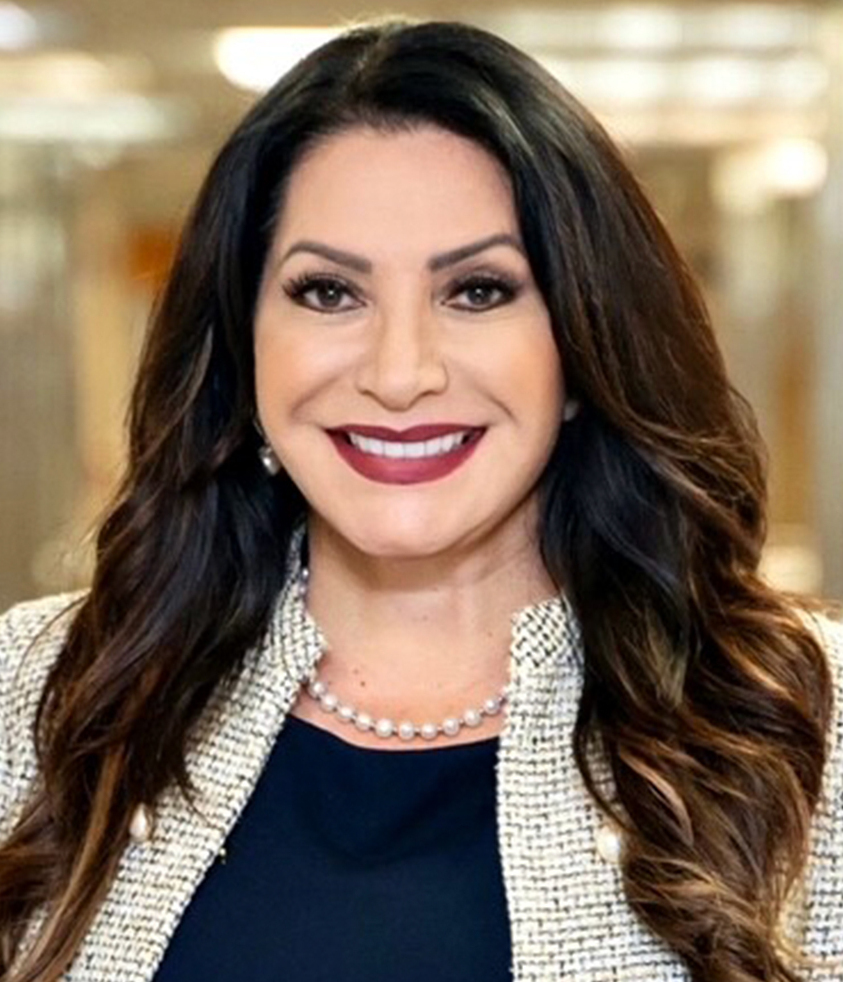

Nominee	Susan Rubio	Mike Netter
Party	Democratic	Republican
Popular vote	193,898	84,786
Percentage	69.6%	30.4%
Senator before election
Susan Rubio
Democratic
Elected Senator
Susan Rubio
Democratic

The 22nd district consists of the eastern San Gabriel Valley and the Pomona Valley in eastern Los Angeles County, including El Monte, West Covina, Covina, Duarte, Baldwin Park, Irwindale, Vincent, Azusa, San Dimas, La Verne, and Pomona, as well as Montclair, Chino, and Ontario in the southwestern corner of San Bernardino County. The incumbent is two-term Democrat Susan Rubio, who is eligible to run for re-election.

=== Candidates ===
==== Declared ====
- R.R. Jimenez (no party preference)
- Mike Netter (Republican)
- Susan Rubio (Democratic), incumbent state senator

=== Endorsements ===
Susan Rubio (D)

Political parties

- California Democratic Party

=== Results ===
2026 California's 22nd State Senate district election
Primary election
Party	Candidate	Votes	%
Democratic	Susan Rubio (incumbent)	107,472	62.30
Republican	Mike Netter	59,749	34.64
No party preference	R. R. Jimenez	5,282	3.06
Total votes		172,503	100.0
General election
Democratic	Susan Rubio (incumbent)	193,898	69.58
Republican	Mike Netter	84,786	30.42
Total votes		278,684	100.0
Democratic hold			

== District 24 ==
District 24
- November 3, 2026

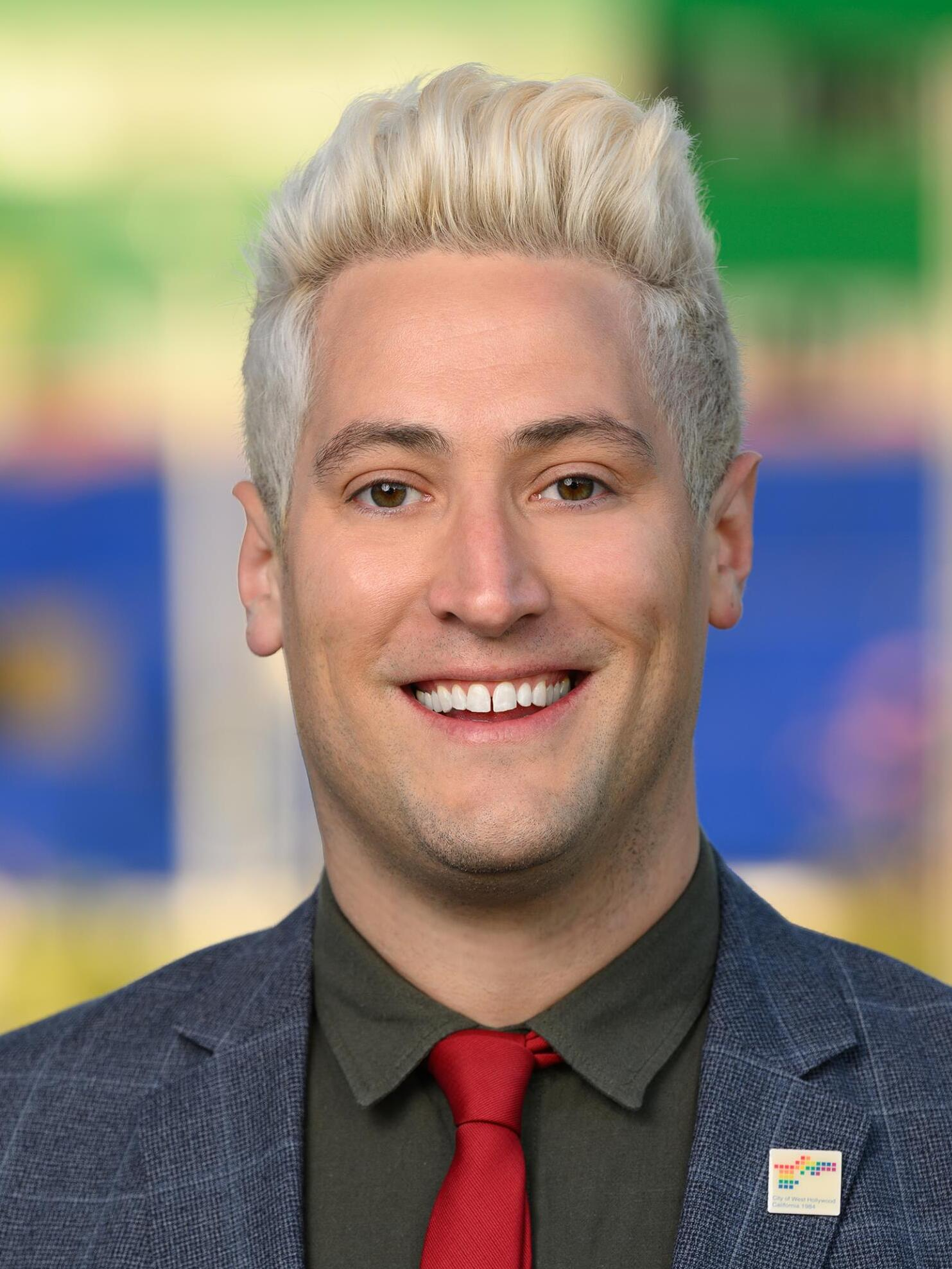
Nominee	Brian Goldsmith	John Erickson
Party	Democratic	Democratic
Popular vote	198,000	159,364
Percentage	55.4%	44.6%
Senator before election
Ben Allen
Democratic
Elected Senator
Brian Goldsmith
Democratic

The 24th district contains the Westside Los Angeles neighborhoods of Venice, West Los Angeles, Pacific Palisades, Brentwood, Bel Air, Century City, Sunset Strip, Laurel Canyon, Hollywood, and Miracle Mile, and the Santa Monica Mountains cities such as Hidden Hills, Calabasas, Topanga, and Malibu, as well as most of the South Bay cities of Los Angeles County, including Rancho Palos Verdes, Rolling Hills, Torrance, Redondo Beach, Manhattan Beach, El Segundo, Marina Del Rey, Santa Monica, Beverly Hills, and West Hollywood. The incumbent is three-term Democrat Ben Allen of Santa Monica, who is term-limited and running for California insurance commissioner.

=== Candidates ===
==== Declared ====
- Eric Alegria (Democratic), Palos Verdes Peninsula School Board member
- Amaris Dordar (Democratic), private practice attorney
- John Erickson (Democratic), West Hollywood city councilmember (2020–present)
- Ellen Evans (Democratic), president of the Doheny Sunset Plaza neighborhood council
- Brian Goldsmith (Democratic), business owner
- Kristina Irwin (Republican), Palisades Charter High School trustee and runner-up for this district in 2022
- G. Rick Marshall (Republican), clinical IT specialist
- Mike Newhouse (Democratic), member of the Los Angeles Planning Commission and candidate for Los Angeles's 11th City Council district in 2022
- Sion Roy (Democratic), Santa Monica College trustee and former president of the Los Angeles County Medical Association
- Zennon Ulyate-Crow (Democratic), housing advocate

=== Endorsements ===
Eric Alegria (D)

Statewide officials

- John Chiang, former treasurer of California (2015–2019)

State legislators

- Mike Gatto, former state assemblymember
- Anthony Rendon, state assemblymember

Labor unions

- International Brotherhood of Electrical Workers Local 40
Zennon Ulyate-Crow (D)

Local officials

- Fred Keeley, mayor of Santa Cruz (2022–present)
- Michael Tubbs, former mayor of Stockton (2017–2021)
John Erickson (D)

Executive branch officials

- Hilda Solis, chair of Los Angeles County (2015–2016, 2022–2023, 2025–present) and former U.S. secretary of labor (2009–2013)

Statewide officials

- Fiona Ma, treasurer of California (2019–present)

Municipal officials

- Kathryn Barger, supervisor of Los Angeles County from the 5th district (2016–present)
- Janice Hahn, supervisor of Los Angeles County from the 4th district (2016–present)
- Lindsey Horvath, supervisor of Los Angeles County from the 3rd district (2022–present)
- Jeffrey Prang, assessor of Los Angeles County (2014–present)

Labor unions

- California Federation of Teachers
- Los Angeles County Federation of Labor
- Los Angeles County Firefighters
- UNITE HERE Local 11

Organizations

- Abundant Housing LA
- Equality California

Political parties

- California Working Families Party
Ellen Evans (D)

State legislators

- Rick Zbur, state assemblymember from the 51st district (2022–present) (co-endorsement with Goldsmith, Newhouse, and Roy)
Brian Goldsmith (D)

Executive branch officials

- Pete Buttigieg, former U.S. secretary of transportation (2021–2025)
- Hillary Clinton, former secretary of state (2009–2013)

U.S. senators

- Barbara Boxer, former U.S. senator from California (1993–2017)

U.S. representatives

- Nancy Pelosi, CA-11 (2023–present)

State legislators

- Ben Allen, California state senator from the 24th district (2014–present) and incumbent state senator for this district
- Jesse Gabriel, state assemblymember from the 46th district (2018–present)
- Jacqui Irwin, state assemblymember from the 42nd district (2014–present)
- Henry Stern, state senator from the 27th district (2016–present)
- Rick Zbur, state assemblymember from the 51st district (2022–present) (co-endorsement with Evans, Newhouse, and Roy)

Municipal officials

- Lili Bosse, former mayor of Beverly Hills (2014–2015, 2017–2018, 2022–2023)
- John Heilman, Mayor of West Hollywood
- Nathan Hochman, Los Angeles County district attorney (2024–present)
- Antonio Villaraigosa, former mayor of Los Angeles (2005–2013)

Individuals

- Eric Alegria, former member of the Palos Verdes Peninsula Unified School District Board of Education and former candidate for this seat
- Rick Caruso, CEO of Caruso
- Katie Couric, journalist
- Ellen Evans, president of the Doheny Sunset Plaza Neighborhood Association and former candidate for this seat
- Mike Newhouse, former vice president of the Los Angeles City Planning Commission and former candidate for this seat

Labor unions

- CAL FIRE Local 2881
- International Alliance of Theatrical Stage Employees
- Los Angeles Police Protective League

Organizations

- California Environmental Voters
- California Legislative Jewish Caucus
Mike Newhouse (D)

State legislators

- Rick Zbur, state assemblymember from the 51st district (2022–present) (co-endorsement with Evans, Goldsmith, and Roy)

Labor unions

- California Fraternal Order of Police
Sion Roy (D)

State legislators

- Richard Bloom, former state assemblymember
- Rick Zbur, state assemblymember from the 51st district (2022–present) (co-endorsement with Evans, Goldsmith, and Newhouse)

Political parties

- California Democratic Party

=== Results ===
2026 California's 24th State Senate district election
Primary election
Party	Candidate	Votes	%
Democratic	John M. Erickson	62,397	20.50
Democratic	Brian Goldsmith	55,627	18.28
Republican	G. Rick Marshall	53,350	17.53
Republican	Kristina Irwin	42,939	14.11
Democratic	Sion Roy	41,956	13.78
Democratic	Mike Newhouse	13,824	4.54
Democratic	Eric Alegria	12,412	4.08
Democratic	Amaris Samara Dordar	9,351	3.07
Democratic	Ellen Evans	9,024	2.96
Democratic	Zennon Ulyate-Crow	3,498	1.15
Total votes		304,378	100.0
General election
Democratic	Brian Goldsmith	198,000	55.41
Democratic	John M. Erickson	159,364	44.59
Total votes		357,364	100.0
Democratic hold			

== District 26 ==
District 26
- November 3, 2026

Nominee	Sara Hernandez	Sarah Rascón
Party	Democratic	Democratic
Popular vote	129,751	114,027
Percentage	53.2%	46.8%
Senator before election
Maria Elena Durazo
Democratic
Elected Senator
Sara Hernandez
Democratic

The 26th district is located in the central and eastern Los Angeles neighborhoods of Los Feliz, East Hollywood, Silver Lake, Echo Park, Cypress Park, Koreatown, Wilshire Center, Westlake, Glassell Park, Eagle Rock, Garvanza, Lincoln Heights, Hermon, Little Tokyo, Chinatown, Boyle Heights, and El Sereno, along with the adjascent communities of City Terrace, East Los Angeles and Vernon. The incumbent is second-term Democrat Maria Elena Durazo of Los Angeles, who is eligible to run for re-election but is instead running for the Los Angeles County Board of Supervisors.

=== Candidates ===
==== Declared ====
- Claudia Agraz (Republican)
- Paul Bowers (Democratic), retired teacher
- Juan Camacho (Democratic), Equality California Institute board president
- Wendy Carrillo (Democratic), former state assemblymember from the 52nd district (2017–2024) and candidate for Los Angeles's 14th City Council district in 2024
- Sara Hernandez (Democratic), Los Angeles Community College School Board trustee
- Sang "Sam Shin" Masog (Republican), pastor
- Maebe Pudlo (Democratic), Silver Lake neighborhood councilmember and candidate for California's 30th congressional district in 2020, 2022, and 2024
- Sarah Rascón (Democratic), former director of county and regional affairs for Los Angeles Mayor Karen Bass

==== Declined ====
- Maria Elena Durazo (Democratic), incumbent state senator (running for the Los Angeles County Board of Supervisors)

=== Endorsements ===
Juan Camacho (D)

Statewide officials

- Ricardo Lara, insurance commissioner of California (2019–present)

State legislators

- Mark Gonzalez, state assemblymember from the 54th district (2024–present)
- Rick Zbur, state assemblymember from the 51st district (2022–present)

Organizations

- Equality California
Wendy Carrillo (D)

Organizations

- Center for Biological Diversity Action Fund
Sara Hernandez (D)

Individuals

- Dolores Huerta, labor leader

Labor unions

- California Federation of Teachers
- California Teachers Association

Organizations

- Center for New Liberalism
- Sierra Club

Newspapers

- La Opinión
Declined to endorse

Political parties

- California Democratic Party

=== Results ===
2026 California's 26th State Senate district election
Primary election
Party	Candidate	Votes	%
Democratic	Sara Hernandez	54,799	31.17
Democratic	Sarah Rascón	34,158	19.43
Democratic	Wendy Carrillo	24,111	13.72
Democratic	Maebe Pudlo	22,886	13.02
Republican	Claudia Agraz	13,736	7.81
Democratic	Juan Camacho	13,392	7.62
Republican	Sang "Sam Shin" Masog	10,199	5.80
Democratic	Paul A. Bowers	2,500	1.42
Total votes		175,781	100.0
General election
Democratic	Sara Hernandez	129,751	53.23
Democratic	Sarah Rascón	114,027	46.77
Total votes		243,778	100.0
Democratic hold			

== District 28 ==
District 28
- November 3, 2026
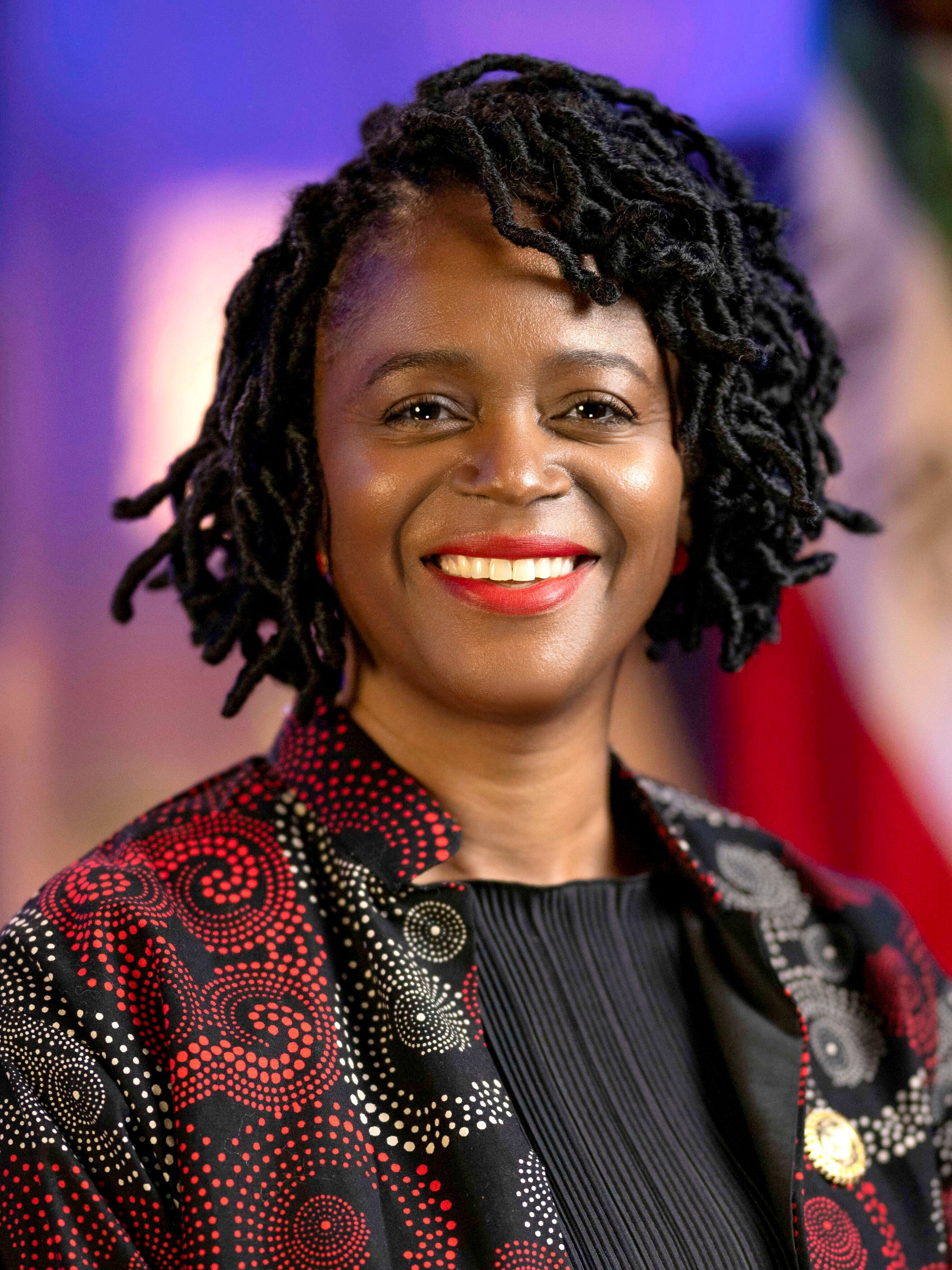

Nominee	Lola Smallwood-Cuevas	Joe Lisuzzo
Party	Democratic	Republican
Popular vote	234,633	40,594
Percentage	85.2%	14.8%
Senator before election
Lola Smallwood-Cuevas
Democratic
Elected Senator
Lola Smallwood-Cuevas
Democratic

The 28th district contains Downtown Los Angeles and most of South Central Los Angeles, including Park La Brea, Pico Union, Mid City, West Adams, Baldwin Hills, Hyde Park, Nevin, Leimert Park, Jefferson Park, Crenshaw, Vermont Square, Adams-Normandie, Florence, Exposition Park, University Park, and Skid Row, as well as suburbs of Culver City, Ladera Heights, and a small part of the Westside Los Angeles neighborhoods, including Palms, Mar Vista and Playa Vista. The incumbent is first-term Democrat Lola Smallwood-Cuevas of Los Angeles, who is eligible to run for re-election.

=== Candidates ===
==== Declared ====
- Daphne Bradford (no party preference), educator
- Joe Lisuzzo (Republican), restaurant owner
- Lola Smallwood-Cuevas (Democratic), incumbent state senator

=== Endorsement ===
Lola Smallwood-Cuevas (D)

Political parties

- California Democratic Party
- California Working Families Party

=== Results ===
2026 California's 28th State Senate district election
Primary election
Party	Candidate	Votes	%
Democratic	Lola Smallwood-Cuevas (incumbent)	151,178	77.51
Republican	Joe Lisuzzo	31,606	16.20
No party preference	Daphne D. Bradford	12,265	6.29
Total votes		195,049	100.0
General election
Democratic	Lola Smallwood-Cuevas (incumbent)	234,633	85.25
Republican	Joe Lisuzzo	40,594	14.75
Total votes		275,227	100.0
Democratic hold			

== District 30 ==
District 30
- November 3, 2026
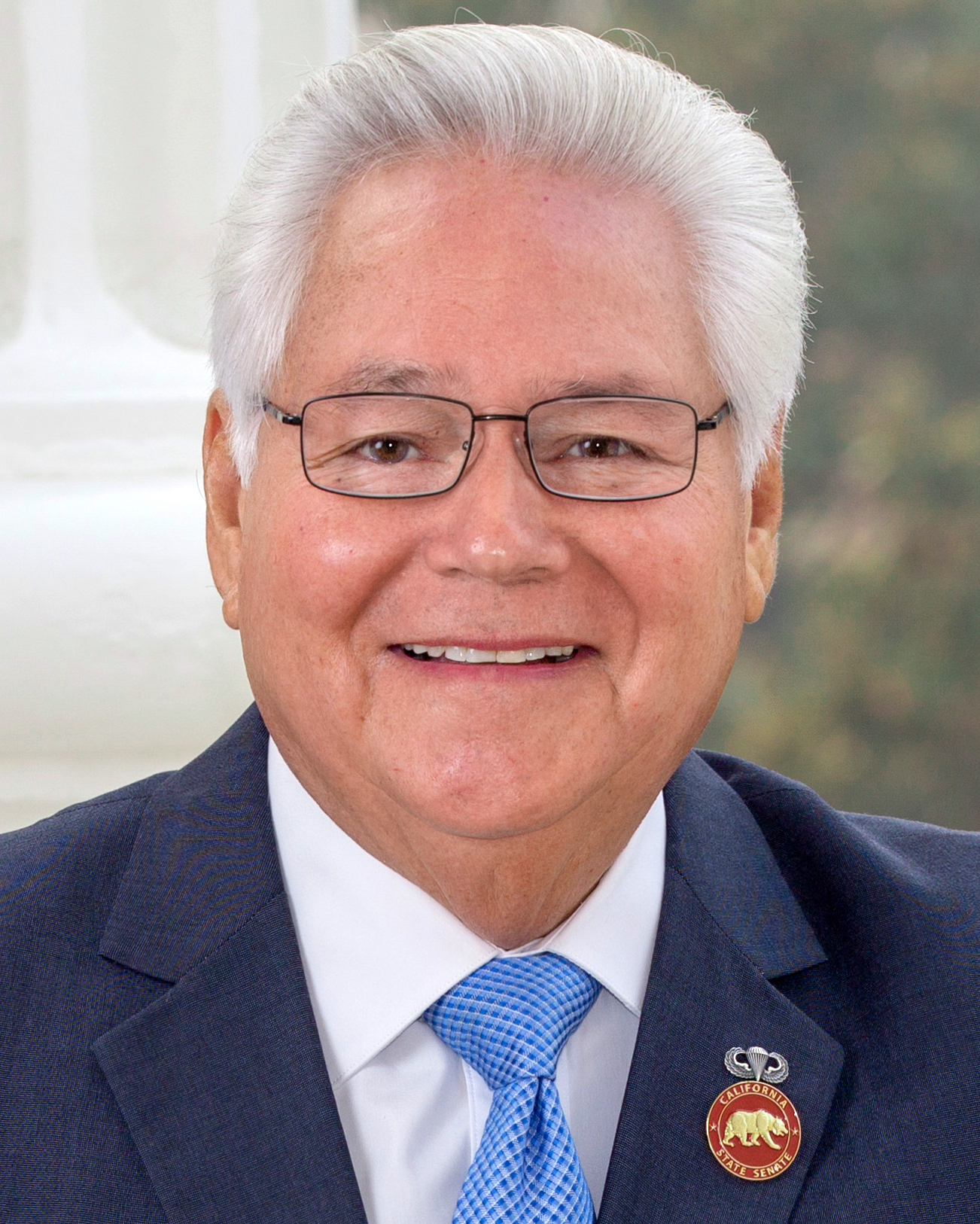

Nominee	Bob Archuleta	Araceli Martinez
Party	Democratic	Republican
Popular vote	211,176	92,933
Percentage	69.4%	30.6%
Senator before election
Bob Archuleta
Democratic
Elected Senator
Bob Archuleta
Democratic

The 30th district contains the Gateway Cities region of southeastern Los Angeles County, including Downey, Norwalk, Bellflower, La Mirada, Santa Fe Springs, Los Nietos, Montebello, Pico Rivera, Whittier, Hacienda Heights, La Puente, Valinda, Avocado Heights, Industry, Rowland Heights, Walnut, and Diamond Bar, along with Brea in northeastern Orange County. The incumbent is second-term Democrat Bob Archuleta of Pico Rivera, who is eligible to run for re-election.

=== Candidates ===
==== Declared ====
- Bob Archuleta (Democratic), incumbent state senator
- Araceli Martinez (Republican), small business owner

=== Endorsements ===
Bob Archuleta (D)

Political parties

- California Democratic Party

=== Results ===
2026 California's 30th State Senate district election
Primary election
Party	Candidate	Votes	%
Democratic	Bob J. Archuleta (incumbent)	124,926	65.11
Republican	Araceli Martinez	66,945	34.89
Total votes		191,871	100.0
General election
Democratic	Bob Archuleta (incumbent)	211,176	69.44
Republican	Araceli Martinez	92,933	30.56
Total votes		304,109	100.0
Democratic hold			

== District 32 ==
District 32
- November 3, 2026
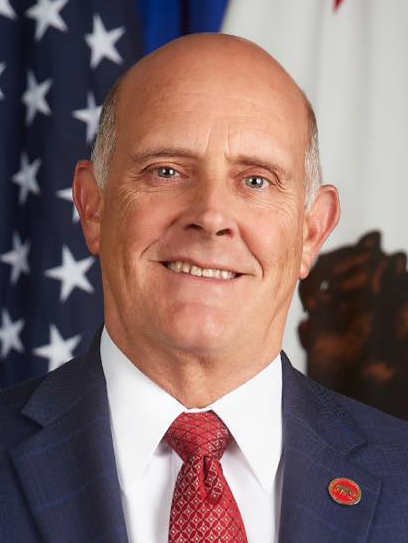

Nominee	Kelly Seyarto	Tiffanie Tate
Party	Republican	Democratic
Popular vote	185,380	172,265
Percentage	51.8%	48.2%
Senator before election
Kelly Seyarto
Republican
Elected Senator
Kelly Seyarto
Republican

The 32nd district consists of the southwestern corner of the Inland Empire, including the Riverside County communities of Temecula, Murrieta, Wildomar, Lake Elsinore, Canyon Lake, Lakeland Village, Alberhill, Menifee, Sage, and Idyllwild, along with Yorba Linda in eastern Orange County, Chino Hills in southwestern San Bernardino County and the rural, northeastern corner of San Diego County. The incumbent is first-term Republican Kelly Seyarto of Murrieta, who is eligible to run for re-election.

=== Candidates ===
==== Declared ====
- Kelly Seyarto (Republican), incumbent state senator
- Tiffanie Tate (Democratic), obstetrician-gynecologist

=== Endorsements ===
Tiffanie Tate (D)

Political parties

- California Democratic Party

=== Results ===
2026 California's 32nd State Senate district election
Primary election
Party	Candidate	Votes	%
Republican	Kelly Seyarto (incumbent)	147,211	58.17
Democratic	Tiffanie Tate	105,870	41.83
Total votes		253,081	100.0
General election
Republican	Kelly Seyarto (incumbent)	185,380	51.83
Democratic	Tiffanie Tate	172,265	48.17
Total votes		357,645	100.0
Republican hold			

== District 34 ==
District 34
- November 3, 2026
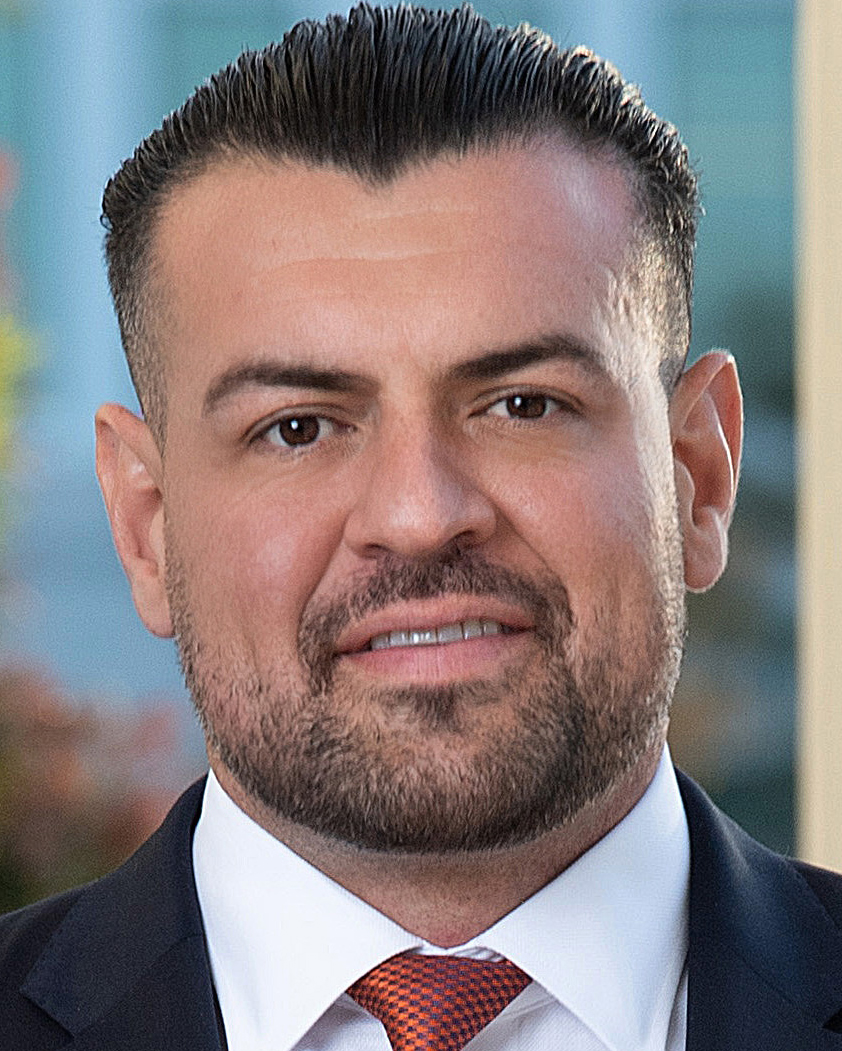

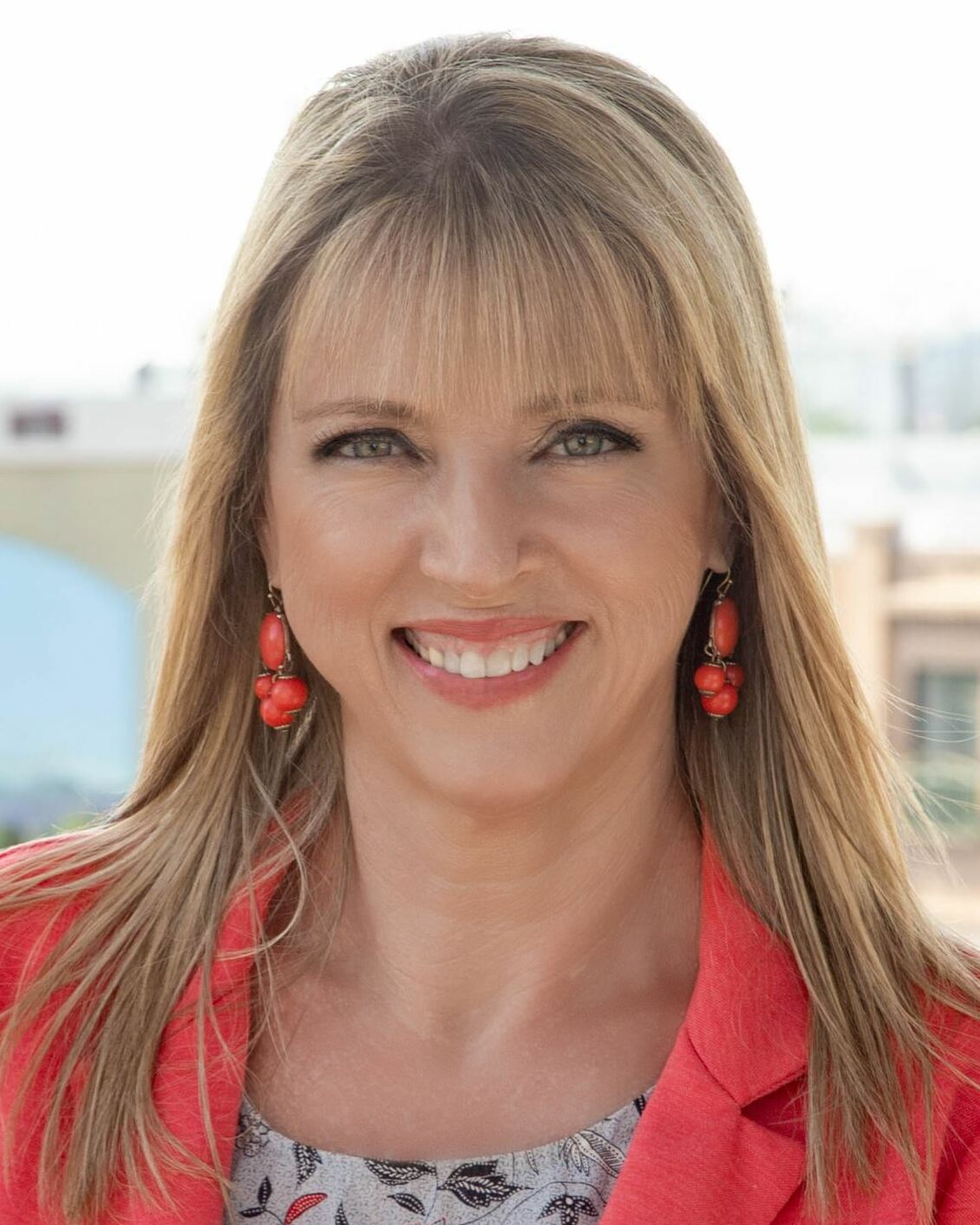
Nominee	Avelino Valencia	Rhonda Shader
Party	Democratic	Republican
Popular vote	169,355	70,338
Percentage	70.6%	29.4%
Senator before election
Tom Umberg
Democratic
Elected Senator
Avelino Valencia
Democratic

The 34th district is based in northern Orange County, including most of Santa Ana, Anaheim, Placentia, Fullerton, Buena Park, La Habra, and the west side of Orange, along with the unincorporated community of South Whittier in Los Angeles County. The incumbent is second-term Democrat Tom Umberg of Santa Ana, who is term-limited and running for the California State Board of Equalization.

=== Candidates ===
==== Declared ====
- Rhonda Shader (Republican), former mayor of Placentia and runner-up for this district in 2022
- Avelino Valencia (Democratic), state assemblymember from the 68th district (2022–present)

==== Declined ====
- Josh Newman (Democratic), former state senator from the 29th district (2016–2018, 2020–2024) (running for superintendent of public instruction)

=== Endorsements ===
Avelino Valencia (D)

U.S. senators

- Adam Schiff, U.S. senator from California (2025–present)

Political parties

- California Democratic Party

=== Results ===
2026 California's 34th State Senate district election
Primary election
Party	Candidate	Votes	%
Democratic	Avelino Valencia	92,826	65.19
Republican	Rhonda Shader	49,569	34.81
Total votes		142,395	100.0
General election
Democratic	Avelino Valencia	169,355	70.65
Republican	Rhonda Shader	70,338	29.35
Total votes		239,693	100.0
Democratic hold			

== District 36 ==
District 36
- November 3, 2026
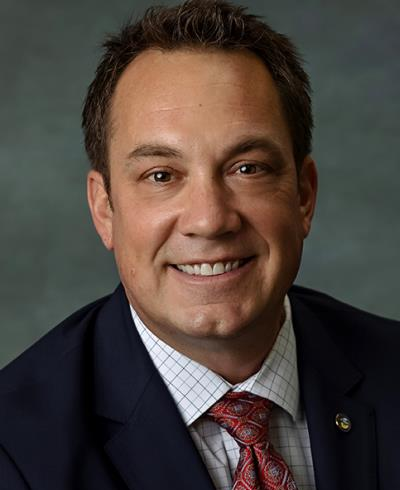

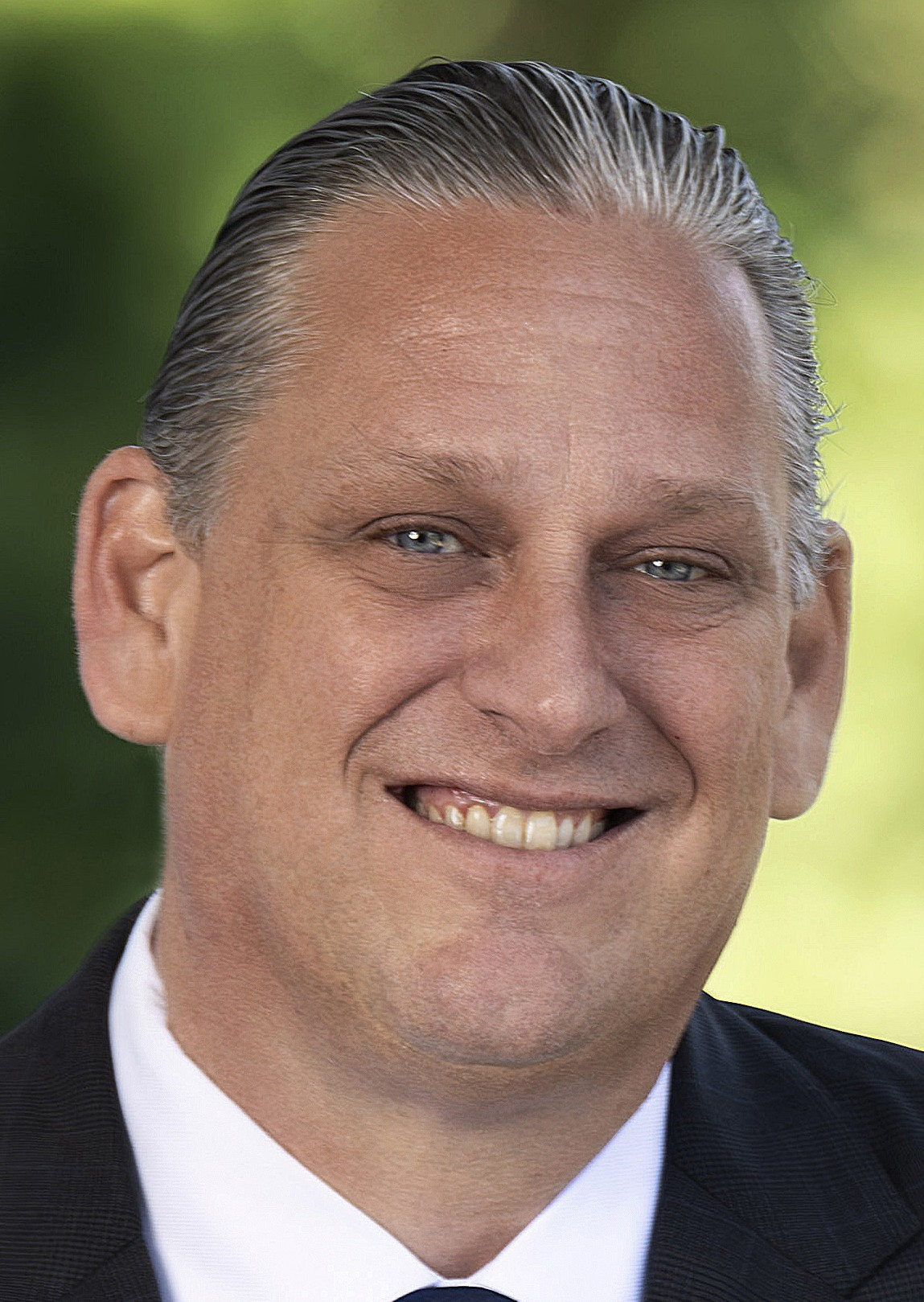
Nominee	Chris Duncan	Tony Strickland
Party	Democratic	Republican
Popular vote	201,223	188,623
Percentage	51.6%	48.4%
- Strickland: 50–60% Duncan: 60–70% Duncan: 50–60% 60–70%
Senator before election
Tony Strickland
Republican
Elected Senator
Chris Duncan
Democratic

The 36th district encompasses most of coastal Orange County, including Seal Beach, Huntington Beach, Newport Beach, Emerald Bay, Laguna Beach, and Dana Point, and the Little Saigon area of northwestern Orange County, including Garden Grove, Westminster, Fountain Valley, Midway City, Stanton, Cypress, Rossmoor, and Los Alamitos, along with Artesia, Cerritos, and Hawaiian Gardens in southeastern Los Angeles County. The incumbent is Republican Tony Strickland, who was elected in a special election in 2025.

=== Candidates ===
==== Declared ====
- Chris Duncan (Democratic), former mayor of San Clemente and runner-up for California's 74th State Assembly district in 2022 and 2024
- Tony Strickland (Republican), incumbent state senator

==== Withdrawn ====
- Rick Foster (Democratic), member of the Orange County Development Processing Review Committee

=== Endorsement ===
Chris Duncan (D)

Organizations

- Center for Biological Diversity Action Fund

Political parties

- California Democratic Party

=== Results ===
2026 California's 36th State Senate district election
Primary election
Party	Candidate	Votes	%
Republican	Tony Strickland (incumbent)	145,638	53.43
Democratic	Chris Duncan	126,952	46.57
Total votes		272,590	100.0
General election
Democratic	Chris Duncan	201,223	51.62
Republican	Tony Strickland (incumbent)	188,623	48.38
Total votes		389,846	100.0
Democratic gain from Republican			

== District 38 ==
District 38
- November 3, 2026
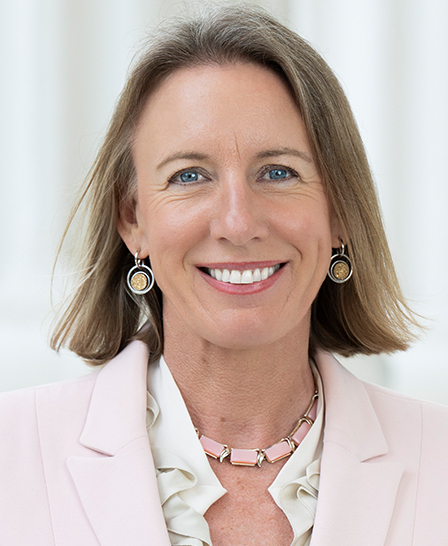

Nominee	Catherine Blakespear	Laura Bassett
Party	Democratic	Republican
Popular vote	236,508	172,313
Percentage	57.9%	42.1%
Senator before election
Catherine Blakespear
Democratic
Elected Senator
Catherine Blakespear
Democratic

The 38th district encompasses the coastal North County San Diego County communities of La Jolla, Del Mar, Solana Beach, Cardiff, Rancho Santa Fe, Encinitas, Carlsbad, Vista, Oceanside, San Luis Rey, and Camp Pendleton Marine Corps Base, along with the southern edge of Orange County, including San Clemente, San Juan Capistrano, Ladera Ranch, Las Flores, and Rancho Santa Margarita. The incumbent is one-term Democrat Catherine Blakespear of Encinitas, who is eligible to run for re-election.

=== Candidates ===
==== Declared ====
- Laura Bassett (Republican), professional fiduciary
- Catherine Blakespear (Democratic), incumbent state senator

==== Withdrawn ====
- Armen Kurdian (Republican), U.S. Navy veteran, candidate for Vista city council in 2022 (running for U.S. House)

=== Endorsements ===
Catherine Blakespear (D)

Organizations

- Center for Biological Diversity Action Fund

Political parties

- California Democratic Party

=== Results ===
2026 California's 38th State Senate district election
Primary election
Party	Candidate	Votes	%
Democratic	Catherine S. Blakespear (incumbent)	155,938	54.71
Republican	Laura Bassett	129,078	45.29
Total votes		285,016	100.0
General election
Democratic	Catherine Blakespear (incumbent)	236,508	57.85
Republican	Laura Bassett	172,313	42.15
Total votes		408,821	100.0
Democratic hold			

== District 40 ==
District 40
- November 3, 2026
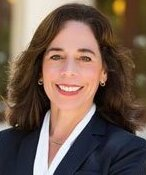

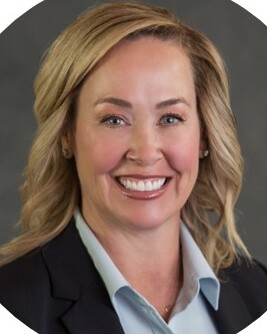
Nominee	Mara Elliott	Kristie Bruce-Lane
Party	Democratic	Republican
Popular vote	209,800	172,499
Percentage	54.9%	45.1%
Senator before election
Brian Jones
Republican
Elected Senator
Mara Elliott
Democratic

The 40th district encompasses much of inland San Diego County, including Santee, Poway, Alpine, Pine Valley, Ramona, San Marcos, Escondido, Hidden Meadows, Valley Center, Pauma Valley, and Fallbrook, as well as the northeastern parts of the city of San Diego. The incumbent is second-term Republican Brian Jones of Santee, who is term-limited and ineligible to run for re-election.

=== Candidates ===
==== Declared ====
- Kristie Bruce-Lane (Republican), former member of the Olivenhain Municipal Water District Board of Directors and runner-up for California's 76th State Assembly district in 2022 and 2024
- Mara Elliott (Democratic), former San Diego City Attorney (2016–2024)
- Ed Musgrove (Republican), San Marcos city councilor

==== Withdrawn ====
- Sabrina Bazzo (Democratic), San Diego Unified School District trustee
- Marni von Wilpert (Democratic), San Diego city councilor from District 5 (2020–present) (running for U.S. House)

=== Endorsements ===
Kristie Bruce-Lane (R)

Executive branch officials

- Richard Grenell, special presidential envoy for special missions (2025–present)

Organizations

- California College Republicans
- Reform California
Mara Elliott (D)

Political parties

- California Democratic Party
Ed Musgrove (R)

State legislators

- Brian Jones, incumbent state senator from the 40th district

=== Results ===
2026 California's 40th State Senate district election
Primary election
Party	Candidate	Votes	%
Democratic	Mara Elliott	125,669	47.95
Republican	Kristie Bruce-Lane	72,709	27.74
Republican	Ed Musgrove	63,716	24.31
Total votes		262,094	100.0
General election
Democratic	Mara Elliott	209,800	54.88
Republican	Kristie Bruce-Lane	172,499	45.12
Total votes		382,299	100.0
Democratic gain from Republican			
