= Scott Sakakihara =

American politician

- Official portrait, c. 2020s

Member-elect of the California State Senate from the 10th district
- Assuming office December 7, 2026
- Succeeding: Aisha Wahab

Member of the Union City City Council from the 4th district
- Incumbent
- Assumed office 2022

Personal details
- Born: Union City, California, U.S.
- Party: Democratic
- Spouse: Melinda
- Children: 3
- Education: University of California, San Diego (BA); Harvard Law School (JD)

Military service
- Branch/service: United States Navy Reserve

Scott Sakakihara is an American politician serving as a member of the city council of Union City since 2022. He is a candidate for the California State Senate in 2026. Sakakihara is an intelligence officer in the United States Navy Reserve and previously served as chief of staff at Palantir until 2025.

== Early life and career ==
Sakakihara's grandparents were incarcerated in concentration camps for Japanese Americans during World War II, including Manzanar. He was born and raised in Union City, California then graduated from the University of California, San Diego and Harvard Law School.

Sakakihara participated in the Japanese American Citizens League Masaoka Fellowship interning in the office of Mazie Hirono, then a U.S. Representative, and in the Obama White House in 2009. In 2010, he worked as a campaign spokesman for the campaign of Barbara Boxer.

Sakakihara is an active intelligence officer in the United States Navy Reserve and worked at Palantir until leaving in 2025 reportedly due to "disagreements” with the company, "specifically the work with ICE."

== Political career ==
In 2022, Sakakiraha was elected to the Union City Council. He represents Union City on the Housing Authority of the County of Alameda's Housing Commission, which he chairs.

In January 2026, Sakakihara announced his campaign for the 10th district of the California Senate, where incumbent Democrat Aisha Wahab was retiring to run for the U.S. House. He entered the race stating he would loan his campaign $250,000.

In May 2026, Sakakihara was noted as leading the fundraising field with $399,003 primarily from his $250,000 loan and personally donating $48,992. By June, he had loaned his campaign a total of $1 million in addition to receiving over $1 million in support from Uber, over $966,000 from Meta, and $1 million from Chris Larsen and Tim Draper’s Grow California super PAC.

== Electoral history ==
Union City Council: District 4
| Party | Candidate | Votes | % | ±% |
|---|---|---|---|---|
| Nonpartisan | Scott Sakakihara | 3,028 | 62.83% | |
| Nonpartisan | Vipan S. Bajwa | 1,791 | 37.17% | |

2026 California State Senate election: District 10
| Party | Candidate | Votes | % | ±% |
|---|---|---|---|---|
| Democratic | Scott Sakakihara | 207,575 | 74.6% | |
| Republican | Linda R. Price | 41,329 | 27.6% | |
