= Alexandra Duarte =

American politician (born 1974)

Member-elect of the California Senate from the 4th district
- Assuming office December 7, 2026
- Succeeding: Marie Alvarado-Gil

Personal details
- Born: Alexandra Napier; 1974 (age 51–52) Australia
- Party: Republican
- Spouse: John Duarte (m. 1996)
- Children: 4
- Education: University of Sydney
- Website: www.alexandraforsenate.com

Alexandra Duarte (née Napier; born 1974) is an American politician and pistachio farmer who is a member-elect of the California State Senate from the 4th district, being elected in the 2026 election. A Republican, she is the wife of John Duarte, who served in the United States House of Representatives from 2023 to 2025.

== Early life, education, and career ==
Alexandra Napier was born in 1974 in Australia to Ian and Barbara Napier, who were from Moss Vale. She graduated from the University of Sydney and later moved to the United States. She married John Duarte in Modesto, California on October 26, 1996, with the couple having four children. Before she went into farming, Napier worked in marketing. By 1997, she was the marketing coordinator for Duarte Nursery, the family business of her husband's family. In 1999, Duarte won a competition for her proposal to add more water storage capacity to California's water plan.

== Political career ==
In 2022, John ran for the United States House of Representatives in the redrawn 13th district, with Alexandra Duarte campaigning for him. In 2026, Duarte herself challenged incumbent Marie Alvarado-Gil in that year's California State Senate election, with Alvarado-Gil having been elected as a Democrat and joined the Republican Party on August 8, 2024. Duarte ran on a right-wing platform focused on gun rights, border security, and opposition to transgender rights as Alvarado-Gil was considered more moderate.

In November 2025, Alvarado-Gil accused Duarte's campaign manager of photographing her private phone conversations at an event. In May 2026, the California Republican Party condemned Duarte's campaign over a flyer showing Duarte holding a handgun pointed toward a photograph of Alvarado-Gil, though regional Republican groups supported Duarte's campaign. She placed second to Tuolumne County supervisor Jaron Brandon, with Alvarado-Gil being eliminated in the primary. In the general election, Duarte repeatedly focused on Brandon's 2015 arrest on suspicion of public intoxication, a charge that was later dropped. The attacks were described as mudslinging and a "below-the-belt punch." After Duarte led in the early vote, Brandon conceded on November 12.
