= Marie Alvarado-Gil =

American politician (born 1973)

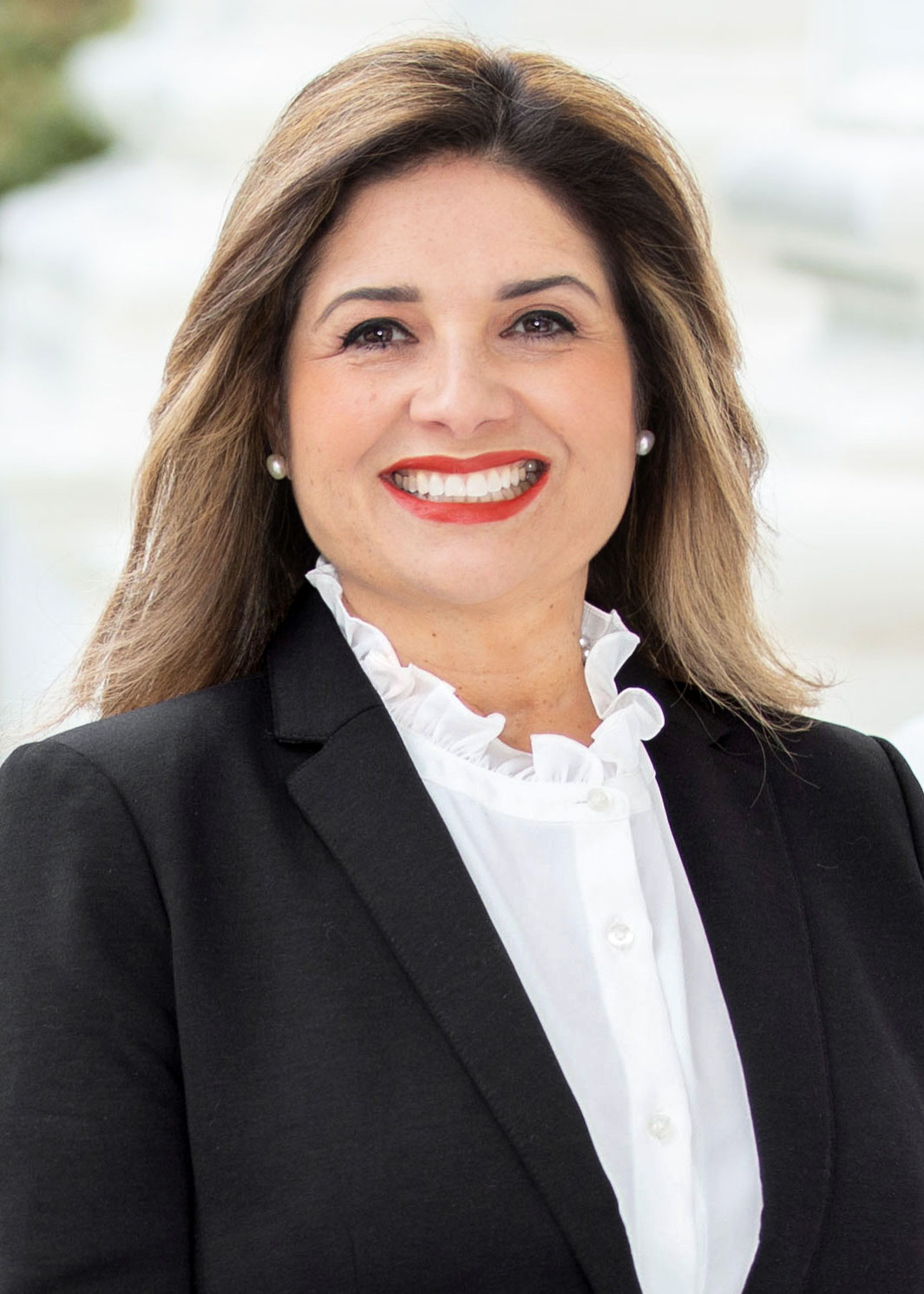
- Official portrait, 2023

Member of the California State Senate from the 4th district
- Incumbent
- Assumed office December 5, 2022
- Preceded by: Jim Nielsen

Personal details
- Born: December 24, 1973 (age 52) Mountain View, California
- Party: Republican (since 2024)
- Other political affiliations: Democratic (until 2024)
- Children: 6 (3 biological, 3 step)
- Education: University of California, Davis (no degree); University of San Francisco (BA, MPA)
- Occupation: Educator

Marie Issa Alvarado-Gil (born December 24, 1973) is an American educator and politician who represents California's 4th State Senate district in the California State Senate, following her election in 2022. Elected as a member of the Democratic Party, she joined the Republican Party in August 2024.

== Early life and education ==
Alvarado-Gil was born in Mountain View, California, to parents from Jalisco, Mexico. She was placed in foster care by fifth grade and spent part of her youth with her Mexican grandmother who owned a tortilla factory in Mexico. She attended UC Davis, studying animal science. In her third year at the school, Alvarado-Gil pivoted from her education to raise her three children in rural northern California. She later attended the University of San Francisco, where she obtained both a Bachelors degree and a Master of Public Administration.

== Political career ==
Alvarado-Gil ran as a Democrat for California's 4th State Senate district in the 2022 California State Senate election. She placed second in the top-two primary, with fellow Democrat Tim Robertson placing first. This guaranteed that the district, which is largely rural and tends to lean Republican, would be represented by a Democrat. She beat Robertson in the general election, earning 52.7% of the vote.

=== Party change ===
On August 8, 2024, Alvarado-Gil crossed the floor and joined the Republican Party. Upon switching her party affiliation, Alvarado-Gil lost all her committee assignments, and was forced out of the Latino Caucus. Alvarado-Gil is fiscally conservative and had previously voted with Republicans on labor, security and economic legislation; though she had also aligned with the Democratic Party on certain social issues. While the change was welcomed by Senate Minority Leader Brian Jones and Assembly Minority Leader James Gallagher, conservative Assemblymember Bill Essayli dubbed her a "RINO for her previous support of liberal priorities and for her endorsement of Kamala Harris in the 2024 United States presidential election." Alvardo-Gil said that she did not endorse Harris.

=== Sexual harassment lawsuit ===
On September 5, 2024, Alvarado-Gil's former chief of staff Chad Condit, son of former Congressman Gary Condit, filed a lawsuit against her and the California Senate alleging sexual harassment. The suit alleged Alvarado-Gil had demanded he perform sexual acts on her, eventually firing him in retaliation for his refusal. Through an attorney, Alvarado-Gil called the claim "outlandish" and vowed to fight the lawsuit. The lawsuit alleges that Condit eventually capitulated to her demands and performed oral sex upon her in a car during a trip to Inyo County, and that she harassed his family as well. He allegedly injured his back due to having to contort his body in a narrow space. His attorneys said the California Senate is conducting an investigation into Condit's claims.

In November of that year, Alvarado-Gil accused Chad Condit of participating in the murder of Chandra Levy, a woman who had an affair with Condit's father. Condit's attorneys strongly denied the allegation.

In July 2025, Alvarado-Gil was formally reprimanded by the Legislature's Workplace Conduct Unit for filing retaliatory complaints against the Condits the year before, where she had alleged ethics violations on their part related to an infrastructure project in Modesto.

=== 2026 re-election ===
Alvarado-Gil ran for re-election in 2026. She faced two opponents; Democrat Tuolumne County Supervisor Jaron Brandon, and Republican almond farmer Alexandra Duarte, wife of former Congressman John Duarte. Alvarado-Gil lost renomination in the June 2 jungle primary, coming in last place and receiving about 27% of the vote.

== Electoral history ==
2022 California State Senate 4th district election
Primary election
Party	Candidate	Votes	%
Democratic	Tim Robertson	48,880	22.1
Democratic	Marie Alvarado-Gil	41,262	18.7
Republican	George Radanovich	37,793	17.1
Republican	Steven Bailey	37,129	16.8
Republican	Jeff McKay	34,773	15.7
Republican	Jack Griffith	10,337	4.7
Republican	Michael Gordon	6,202	2.8
Republican	Jolene Daly	4,652	2.1
Total votes		221,028	100.0
General election
Democratic	Marie Alvarado-Gil	137,157	52.7
Democratic	Tim Robertson	123,210	47.3
Total votes		260,367	100.0
Democratic gain from Republican			

=== Results ===
2026 California's 4th State Senate district election
Primary election
Party	Candidate	Votes	%
Democratic	Jaron Brandon	109,094	41.33
Republican	Alexandra Duarte	84,630	32.06
Republican	Marie Alvarado-Gil (incumbent)	70,217	26.60
Total votes		263,941	100.0
General election
Democratic	Jaron Brandon		
Republican	Alexandra Duarte		
Total votes			100.0

== Personal life ==
Alvarado-Gil was diagnosed with cervical cancer and metastatic thyroid cancer in 2018, defeating both by 2019. Two of her children have special needs.
