= Sara Hernandez =

American politician

Member-elect of the California Senate from the 26th district
- Assuming office December 7, 2026
- Succeeding: María Elena Durazo

President of the LACCD Board of Trustees
- Incumbent
- Assumed office December 19, 2025
- Preceded by: Kelsey Iino

Member of the LACCD Board of Trustees for Seat 4
- Incumbent
- Assumed office December 9, 2022
- Preceded by: Ernest Moreno

Personal details
- Party: Democratic
- Website: www.sarahernandez.com

Sara Hernandez is an American politician from California. A member of the Democratic Party, she is a member-elect of the California State Senate from the 26th district, after being elected in 2026. She has served as a Los Angeles Community College District trustee since 2022.
