= Nathan Magsig =

American politician

- Official portrait, 2024

Member-elect of the California State Senate from the 12th district
- Assuming office December 7, 2026
- Succeeding: Shannon Grove

Member of the Fresno County Board of Supervisors from the 5th district
- Incumbent
- Assumed office January 9, 2017
- Preceded by: Debbie Poochigian

Mayor of Clovis
- In office March 15, 2005 – March 14, 2007
- Preceded by: Lynne Ashbeck
- Succeeded by: Bob Whalen
- In office March 9, 2015 – January 9, 2017
- Preceded by: Lynne Ashbeck
- Succeeded by: Bob Whalen

Member of the Clovis City Council
- In office March 20, 2001 – January 9, 2017

Personal details
- Born: Nathan Floyd Magsig; 1976 or 1977 (age 49–50) Fresno, California, U.S.
- Party: Republican
- Spouse: Julie Marie Musser (m. 2001)
- Children: 3
- Education: California State University, Fresno (BS, MS, MBA)

Nathan Floyd Magsig (born 1976/1977) is an American politician who is a member-elect of the California State Senate for the 12th district since 2026. A Republican, he previously served as a member of the Fresno County Board of Supervisors since 2017, and as a member of the Clovis city council from 2001 until 2017. Magsig was also a candidate for the United States House of Representatives in 2022, challenging incumbent Republican Tom McClintock in the 5th district. He placed third in the blanket primary with 13.2% of the vote.

== Early life and education ==
Nathan Floyd Magsig was born in 1976/1977 and raised in Fresno, California. His father, Lowell Samuel Magsig, was a pilot in the Oregon Air National Guard and a pastor who moved to Southern California in 1982 to serve as Quaker pastor of Midway City Friends Church in Midway City. In 1989, he moved to Fresno to pastor Friends Community Church, where he served until December 1995. His mother, Sally Wiesbecker, was from Sacramento and was studying psychology at California State University, Fresno, by 1989. Magsig has two siblings: an older sister, Marla, and a younger sister, Selah. Lowell and two other passengers were killed in a Piper PA-28 crash in Kings Canyon National Park in November 1998 while attempting to return to Fresno from a business trip to Las Vegas.

Magsig attended school in Clovis, California, and later studied at California State University, Fresno, where he earned a Bachelor of Science and a Master of Science in criminology, as well as a Master of Business Administration.

== Political career ==
Magsig (bottom left) with other Clovis councilors at the Fresno Air National Guard Base in December 2014.

=== Clovis City Council ===
Magsig first ran for Seat 5 on the Fresno County Republican Central Committee in 2000, placing seventh with 8% of the vote. He also served on the Southwest Clovis Area Redevelopment Committee. That same year, while working as a field representative for California State Assemblymember Mike Briggs, he ran for Clovis City Council in an election to fill the vacant seats of Bob Waterson and Tom Stearns. In the March 2001 election, Magsig and Lynne Ashbeck were elected to the council, with Magsig finishing second.

On March 15, 2005, after being sworn in for his second council term, Magsig was elected by the council as mayor of Clovis for a two-year term. He had previously served as mayor pro tempore and was the city’s youngest mayor at the time of his election. He was again elected mayor on March 9, 2015, for another two-year term. He later said that his experience on the Clovis City Council had taught him to identify potential problems early in the political process.

=== Fresno County Board of Supervisors ===
Magsig's official portrait as a member of the Fresno County Board of Supervisors.

Magsig first ran for the Fresno County Board of Supervisors in 2008, challenging incumbent Bob Waterson in the 5th district alongside Debbie Poochigian, the wife of California State Senator Chuck Poochigian and daughter of former supervisor Deran Koligian. Although Waterson had previously decided not to seek re-election, he announced in January 2008 that he would run again because of the state budget crisis, then reversed his decision the following month to work on a children's health initiative. He was defeated by Poochigian in the general election, announcing that he would then run for re-election to the Clovis City Council.

In 2016, Poochigian announced that she would not seek re-election, and Magsig was the first candidate to announce his bid to succeed her. Magsig was endorsed by former county supervisors, several Clovis City Council members, and the Fresno Deputy Sheriff's Association. He said his top priorities were improving water opportunities in the county, promoting economic development, public safety, and strengthening the county’s criminal justice system. He won the election and said he would not ignore agriculture in the county.

Magsig ran for the U.S. House of Representatives in California's 22nd congressional district after incumbent Devin Nunes announced his retirement and resignation, becoming the second local Republican leader to enter the race after State Senator Andreas Borgeas. In February 2022, he withdrew from the race and announced that he would instead run in the newly drawn 5th congressional district, represented by incumbent Tom McClintock. He was defeated in the primary, placing third behind Democrat Mike Barkley and McClintock. In his 2024 re-election campaign, Magsig was challenged by nonprofit manager Jennifer Cruz for his seat on the Board of Supervisors. He defeated Cruz by a wide margin, winning a majority of the vote.

=== California State Senate ===
In 2026, Magsig ran for the California State Senate in the 12th district to succeed term-limited incumbent Shannon Grove. His opponents were Libertarian William Brown Jr., a social worker and businessman, and Louis Anthony Miramontes, a U.S. Marine Corps veteran who described himself as a conservative Republican. Magsig placed first in the primary, receiving about 60% of the vote, and advanced to the general election alongside Brown. After maintaining a substantial lead over Brown throughout the general election, Magsig defeated him by a wide margin.

== Personal life ==
Magsig met Julie Marie Musser in 1995, and they married on August 4, 2001, before moving to Clovis. They have three children: Mason, Michael, and Mark. In 2026, Mason ran for Clovis City Council in the 1st district and became the youngest councilmember in the city’s history, taking the title from his father by 14 months.

== Electoral history ==
Electoral history of Kevin Kiley
Year	Office	Party	Primary			General			Result	Swing	Ref.
Year	Office	Party	Total	%	P.	Total	%	P.	Result	Swing	Ref.
2000	GOP Co. Central Comm. #5	Republican	4,269	8.13%	7th	No general held			Lost	N/A	
2001	Clovis City Council	Nonpartisan	No primary held			4,176	26.79%	2nd	Won	N/A	
2008	Fresno County Board of Supervisors	Nonpartisan	12,930	44.54%	2nd	No general held			Lost	N/A	
2009	Clovis City Council	Nonpartisan	No primary held			9,668	37.96%	1st	Won	N/A	
2016	Fresno County Board of Supervisors	Nonpartisan	25,887	62.34%	1st	No general held			Won	N/A	
2020	Fresno County Board of Supervisors	Nonpartisan	43,536	100.00%	1st	No general held			Won	N/A	
2022	U.S. House of Representatives	Republican	25,299	13.22%	3rd	Did not advance			Lost	N/A	
2024	Fresno County Board of Supervisors	Nonpartisan	29,205	70.90%	1st	No general held			Won	N/A	
2024	GOP Co. Central Comm. #5	Republican	19,729	39.44%	1st	No general held			Won	N/A	
2026	California State Senate	Republican	122,702	59.49%	1st	193,464	61.34%	1st	Won	Hold	
