= Union City =

Union City may refer to:

== Places in the United States ==
- Union City, California
- Union City, Connecticut
- Union City, Georgia
- Union City, Indiana
  - Union City Commercial Historic District
- Union City in Madison County, Kentucky
- Union City, Michigan
- Union City, Montana, a ghost town
- Union City, New Jersey
- Union City, Ohio
- Union City, Oklahoma
- Union City, Pennsylvania
  - Union City Historic District
- Union City, Tennessee

== Other ==
- Union City (film), a 1980 American film
- Union City, a fictional town in the video game Urban Chaos
- Union City Recordings, a record label
- SS Union City, a cargo ship launched in 1909 as SS Iserlohn
