= Chris Duncan (politician) =

American politician

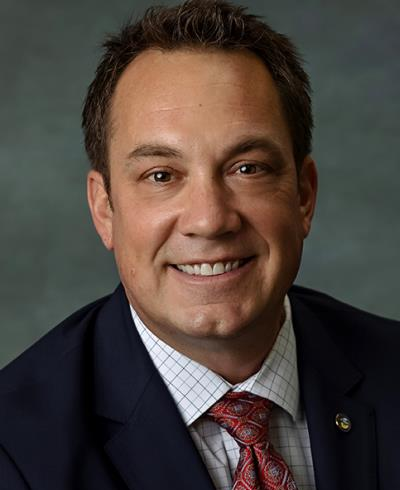

Member-elect of the California State Senate from the 36th district
- Assuming office December 7, 2026
- Succeeding: Tony Strickland

Personal details
- Party: Democratic

Chris Duncan is an American politician. A member of the Democratic Party, he is the member-elect for the 36th district of the California State Senate.
