= John Duarte (politician) =

American politician (born 1966)

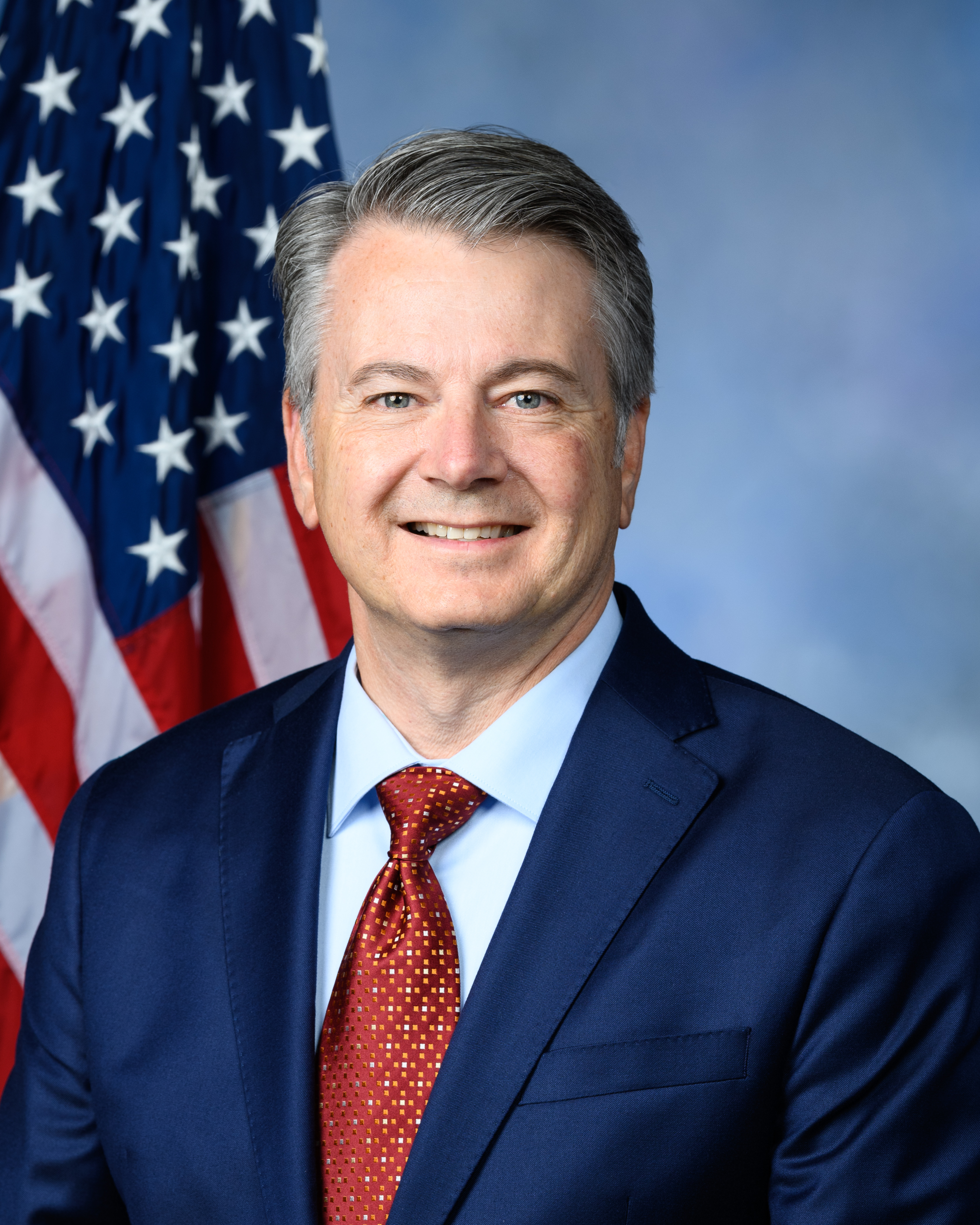
- Official portrait, 2023

Member of the U.S. House of Representatives from California's 13th district
- In office January 3, 2023 – January 3, 2025
- Preceded by: Barbara Lee (redistricted)
- Succeeded by: Adam Gray

Personal details
- Born: John Scott Duarte; September 9, 1966 (age 60) Modesto, California, U.S.
- Party: Republican
- Spouse: Alexandra Napier (m. 1996)
- Children: 4
- Education: San Diego State University (BA); University of the Pacific (MBA)

John Scott Duarte (born September 9, 1966) is an American politician, businessman, and farmer. A member of the Republican Party, he served as the U.S. representative for California's 13th congressional district from 2023 to 2025.

== Early life and education ==
Duarte was born on September 9, 1966, in Modesto, California, to James and Anita Duarte. He is of Portuguese ancestry. Duarte graduated from the University of the Pacific's Eberhardt School of Business with an MBA and a bachelor's degree in finance from San Diego State University in 1989.

== Early career ==
In 1989, Duarte began his career as a vice president of sales for Duarte Trees & Vines, which was founded by his parents in 1988. In 2007, he became the company's chief executive officer and president.

In 2017, Duarte was ordered to pay a $2.8 million government fine after the United States Army Corps of Engineers claimed that he had violated the Clean Water Act by plowing through wetlands to plant wheat on his property in Tehama County.

== U.S. House of Representatives ==
=== Elections ===
==== 2022 ====
On March 9, 2022, Duarte launched a campaign to represent California's 13th congressional district after the 2020 United States redistricting cycle created a new district based in the Central Valley. He and state Assemblyman Adam Gray advanced to the general election. He defeated Gray in the 2022 United States House of Representatives elections by 564 votes. He was declared the winner on December 3, 2022, almost a month after the election.

==== 2024 ====
Duarte ran for reelection against Gray again in 2024. Following weeks of counting, Gray eventually took the lead over Duarte on November 26, 2024, by a margin of 182 votes, with the race being called for Gray on December 4.

=== Tenure ===
Duarte was sworn into office on January 3, 2023. He supported Kevin McCarthy for Speaker of the United States House of Representatives.

In October 2023, Duarte said that House Speaker Kevin McCarthy should be reinstated as Speaker due to the unrest in Israel changing the political dynamics and stakes in the U.S. House. After McCarthy's ouster, Duarte supported Steve Scalise as the nominee. Once Scalise dropped out, Duarte voted for Jim Jordan on the House floor.

=== Committee assignments ===
For the 118th Congress:

- Committee on Agriculture
  - Subcommittee on Conservation, Research, and Biotechnology
  - Subcommittee on Forestry
  - Subcommittee on General Farm Commodities, Risk Management, and Credit
- Committee on Natural Resources
  - Subcommittee on Energy and Mineral Resources
  - Subcommittee on Water, Wildlife and Fisheries
- Committee on Transportation and Infrastructure
  - Subcommittee on Highways and Transit
  - Subcommittee on Railroads, Pipelines, and Hazardous Materials
  - Subcommittee on Water Resources and Environment

== Political positions ==
Duarte has said "I don't care about party politics" and that "I'll stand against 'the woke.' I'll stand against the ultra-conservatives."

Building new infrastructure to secure water for the San Joaquin Valley was one of Duarte's top priorities.

=== Abortion ===
In 2023, Duarte was one of two Republicans to vote against the Ronny Jackson amendment to H.R. 2670: National Defense Authorization Act for Fiscal Year 2024, which would prohibit the Secretary of Defense from paying for or reimbursing expenses relating to abortion services. In 2024, Duarte said he was a pro-choice Republican. Duarte has voiced opposition to a federal ban on abortion but has stated that abortion "should be left to the states".

=== LGBT rights ===
In 2023, Duarte was the only Republican to vote against the Matt Rosendale amendment to H.R. 2670: National Defense Authorization Act for Fiscal Year 2024, which would prohibit TRICARE from covering and the Department of Defense from furnishing gender affirmation surgeries and gender hormone treatments for transgender individuals.

=== Confederate Naming Commission ===
Duarte was one of 41 Republicans to vote against the Bob Good amendment to H.R. 2670: National Defense Authorization Act for Fiscal Year 2024, which would defund a congressionally mandated commission tasked with renaming Army bases and military property named in honor of Confederate leaders.

=== Immigration ===
Duarte has described himself as "immigration fluid", meaning that he both supports greater border security but also recognizes that agriculture depends on farmworkers who lack legal immigration status. He has said only a bipartisan approach will effectively address immigration issues.

In 2023, Duarte was one of two Republicans who voted against H.R. 2, the Secure the Border Act. He called the E-Verify program "devastating for farmers."

Duarte was a sponsor of the Farm Worker Modernization Act which seeks to boost foreign worker availability in the U.S., with benefits to both employers and laborers.

Duarte supports Deferred Action for Childhood Arrivals (DACA).

=== Israel ===
Duarte voted to provide Israel with support following the 2023 Hamas attack on Israel.

== Electoral history ==
Electoral history of John Duarte
Year	Office	Party	Primary			General			Result	Swing	Ref.
Year	Office	Party	Total	%	P.	Total	%	P.	Result	Swing	Ref.
2022	U.S. House	Republican	26,163	34.25%	1st	67,060	50.21%	1st	Won	Gain	
2024	U.S. House	Republican	47,219	54.9%	1st	105,367	49.96%	2nd	Lost	Gain	
Source: Secretary of State of California | Statewide Election Results

== Personal life ==
Duarte married Alexandra Napier on October 26, 1996, in Modesto. He lives with his Alexandra on a pistachio and almond farm outside of Modesto in rural Stanislaus County. They have four children. Duarte is an Episcopalian.

U.S. House of Representatives
Preceded by Barbara Lee	Member of the U.S. House of Representatives from California's 13th congressional district 2023–2025	Succeeded by Adam Gray
U.S. order of precedence (ceremonial)
Preceded by Harley Rouda as Former U.S. Representative	Order of precedence of the United States as Former U.S. Representative	Succeeded by Chip Cravaack as Former U.S. Representative
