= Albert Dekker =

American actor and politician (1905–1968)

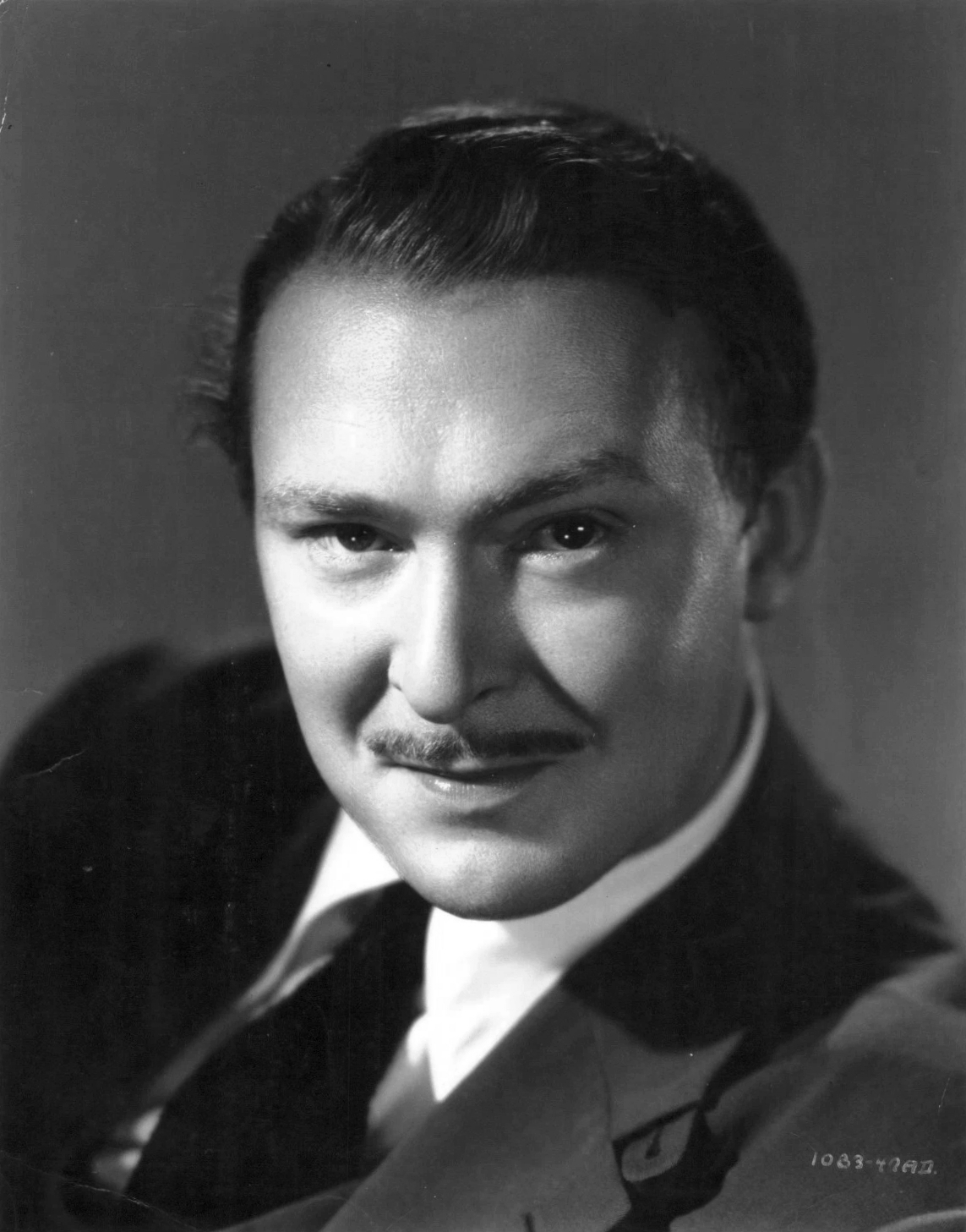
- Dekker in 1940
- Born: Thomas Albert Ecke Van Dekker; December 20, 1905; New York City, U.S.
- Died: May 5, 1968 (aged 62); Hollywood, California, U.S.
- Education: Bowdoin College
- Occupations: Actor, politician
- Years active: 1937-1968
- Successor: Charles J. Conrad
- Political party: Democratic
- Spouse: Esther Guerini (m. 1929; div. 1964)
- Children: 3

Member of the California State Assembly from the 57th district
- In office January 8, 1945 – January 6, 1947
- Preceded by: Franklin J. Potter
- Succeeded by: Charles J. Conrad

Thomas Albert Ecke Van Dekker (December 20, 1905 – May 5, 1968), commonly known as Albert Dekker, was an American actor and politician. He starred in Broadway productions like Death of a Salesman (replacing Lee J. Cobb), An Enemy of the People, A Man for All Seasons, and The Devils. He was also a Hollywood character actor, notably playing memorable villains in films like Dr. Cyclops (1940), The Killers (1946), Kiss Me Deadly (1955), and The Wild Bunch (1969).

As a Democrat, he served in the California State Assembly, representing the 57th district for a single term between 1945 and 1947.

For his contributions to the motion picture industry, Dekker has a star on the Hollywood Walk of Fame.

== Early life and career ==
Dekker was born in Brooklyn, New York City, the only child of Thomas and Grace Ecke Van Dekker. He attended Richmond Hill High School, where he appeared in stage productions. He then attended Bowdoin College, where he majored in pre-med with plans to become a doctor. On the advice of a friend, he decided to pursue acting as a career. He made his professional acting debut with a Cincinnati stock company in 1927. Within a few months, Dekker was featured in the Broadway production of Eugene O'Neill's play Marco Millions.

After a decade of theatrical appearances, Dekker transferred to Hollywood in 1937 and made his first film, 1937's The Great Garrick. He spent most of the rest of his acting career in the cinema but returned to the stage from time to time.

He replaced Lee J. Cobb as Willy Loman in the original production of Arthur Miller's Death of a Salesman, and during a five-year stint back on Broadway in the early 1960s, he played the Duke of Norfolk in Robert Bolt's A Man for All Seasons.

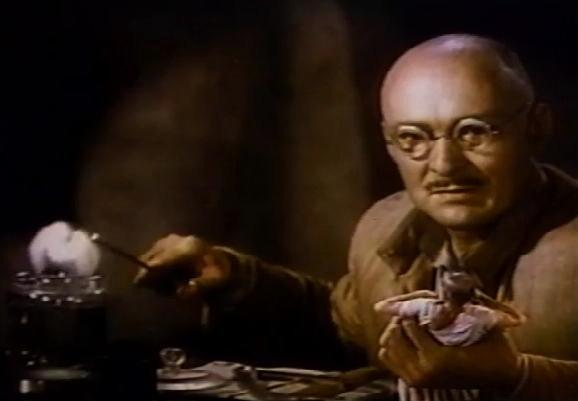
Dekker as Dr. Thorkel in the trailer for Dr. Cyclops (1940)

Dekker appeared in some 70 films from the 1930s to the 1960s. His four most famous screen roles were as a mad scientist in the 1940 horror film Dr. Cyclops, as a criminal mastermind in 1946's The Killers, as a dangerous dealer in atomic fuel in the 1955 Kiss Me Deadly, and as an unscrupulous railroad detective in Sam Peckinpah's Western The Wild Bunch, released in 1969. In 1959, he played a Texas Ranger in The Wonderful Country. He was rarely cast in romantic roles, but in the film Seven Sinners, featuring a romance between Marlene Dietrich and John Wayne, Dietrich sails off with Dekker's character at the end of the film. Dekker was an often memorable guest star – usually a villain – in numerous TV series from the 1950s through 1968, such as Rawhide, The Man from U.N.C.L.E., Mission: Impossible, Climax!, Bonanza, and I Spy. Dekker's role as Pat Harrigan in The Wild Bunch was his last screen appearance; he died over a year before it was released.

== Personal life ==
On April 4, 1929, Dekker married former actress Esther Guerini. The couple had two sons, and named them John and Benjamin, and their daughter whom they named Jan. They divorced in 1964.

In April 1957, Dekker's 16-year-old son, John, fatally shot himself with a .22 rifle. This happened at the family's home in Hastings-on-Hudson, New York. The entire year he had been working on a silencer for the rifle. That death was ruled accidental.

In his book-length account of the production of The Wild Bunch, writer W.K. Stratton describes Dekker as "completely nuts," and possibly the most troubled person on a set filled with eccentrics. According to actor R.G. Armstrong, Dekker showed up to the remote Mexican shooting location of that film in 1968 with a 13-year-old girl he described as his wife, telling people (falsely) that he was a medical doctor, and that after filming he would retire from acting to help impoverished Africans.

=== Politics ===
Dekker's off-screen interest in politics led to his winning a seat in the California State Assembly for the 57th Assembly District in 1944. He served as a Democrat from 1945 to 1947. In 1948, Dekker supported former Vice President Henry A. Wallace for President.

During the McCarthy era, he was an outspoken critic of U.S. Senator Joseph McCarthy's tactics. As a result, Dekker was blacklisted in Hollywood and spent most of the blacklist period working on Broadway rather than in Hollywood (but he did work throughout the 1950s, including a part in Kiss Me Deadly).

== Death ==
On May 5, 1968, Dekker was found dead in his Hollywood home by his fiancée, fashion model and future Love Boat creator Jeraldine Saunders. He had hanged himself in his bathroom while dressed in women's lingerie. His body was covered in explicit words and drawings in red lipstick.

Money and camera equipment were missing, but there was no sign of forced entry. Police, calling it "quite an unusual case", originally said it was suicide but the deputy coroner found no evidence of foul play nor any indication that he planned to take his life and ruled his death accidental, the result of autoerotic asphyxiation. Dekker was cremated, and his remains interred at the Garden State Crematory in North Bergen, New Jersey.

Dekker has a star in the motion picture category on the Hollywood Walk of Fame at 6620 Hollywood Boulevard.

== Filmography ==
Film
Year	Title	Role	Notes
1937	The Great Garrick	M. LeBrun	credited as Albert Van Dekker
1937	She Married an Artist	Whitney Holton	
1938	Extortion	Jeffrey Thompson	credited as Albert Van Dekker
1938	The Lone Wolf in Paris	Marquis Louis de Meyerson	
1938	Marie Antoinette	Comte de Provence	credited as Albert Van Dekker
1938	The Last Warning	Higgs the Butler	
1939	Paris Honeymoon	Amorous Drunk	uncredited
1939	Hotel Imperial	Sergeant	uncredited
1939	Never Say Die	Kidley's Second	uncredited
1939	The Man in the Iron Mask	Louis XIII	
1939	Beau Geste	Legionnaire Schwartz	
1939	The Great Commandment	Longinus	
1940	Strange Cargo	Moll	with Clark Gable and Joan Crawford
1940	Dr. Cyclops	Dr. Thorkel	
1940	Rangers of Fortune	George Bird	
1940	Seven Sinners	Dr. Martin	with John Wayne; alternative title: Cafe of the Seven Sinners
1941	Blonde Inspiration	Phil Hendricks	
1941	You're the One	Luke Laramie	
1941	Reaching for the Sun	Herman	
1941	Honky Tonk	Brazos Hearn	with Clark Gable and Lana Turner
1941	Buy Me That Town	Louie Lanzer	
1941	Among the Living	John Raden / Paul Raden	
1942	The Lady Has Plans	Baron Von Kemp	
1942	Star Spangled Rhythm	Himself	uncredited
1942	Yokel Boy	'Buggsy' Malone	
1942	In Old California	Britt Dawson	with John Wayne
1942	Night in New Orleans	Police Lieutenant William Richards	
1942	Wake Island	Shad McClosky	
1942	The Forest Rangers	Twig Dawson	
1942	Once Upon a Honeymoon	Gaston Le Blanc	
1943	Buckskin Frontier	Gideon Skene	
1943	The Kansan	Steve Barat	
1943	In Old Oklahoma	Jim "Hunk" Gardner	with John Wayne; alternative title: War of the Wildcats
1943	The Woman of the Town	Bat Masterson	with Claire Trevor as Dora Hand
1944	The Hitler Gang	Narrator	uncredited
1944	Experiment Perilous	'Clag' Claghorne	
1945	Salome Where She Danced	Von Bohlen	
1945	Incendiary Blonde	Joe Cadden	
1945	Hold That Blonde!	Police Inspector Callahan	
1946	The French Key	Johnny Fletcher	
1946	Suspense	Frank Leonard	
1946	The Killers	Big Jim Colfax	alternative title: A Man Alone
1946	Two Years Before the Mast	Brown	
1947	California	Mr. Pike	
1947	Slave Girl	Pasha	
1947	Wyoming	Duke Lassiter	
1947	The Pretender	Kenneth Holden	
1947	Cass Timberlane	Boone Havock	
1947	The Fabulous Texan	Gibson Hart	
1947	Gentleman's Agreement	John Minify	with Gregory Peck and Celeste Holm
1948	Fury at Furnace Creek	Edward Leverett	
1948	Lulu Belle	Mark Brady	
1949	Tarzan's Magic Fountain	Mr. Trask	
1949	Bride of Vengeance	Vanetti	
1949	Search for Danger	Kirk	
1950	The Kid from Texas	Alexander Kain	
1950	Destination Murder	Armitage	
1950	The Furies	Mr. Reynolds	
1951	As Young as You Feel	Louis McKinley	
1952	Wait Till the Sun Shines, Nellie	Lloyd Slocum	
1954	The Silver Chalice	Kester	
1955	East of Eden	Will Hamilton	with James Dean
1955	Kiss Me Deadly	Dr. G.E. Soberin	
1955	Illegal	Frank Garland	
1957	She Devil	Dr. Richard Bach	
1958	Machete	Don Luis Montoya	
1959	The Sound and the Fury	Earl Snopes	
1959	These Thousand Hills	Marshal Conrad	
1959	Middle of the Night	Walter Lockman	with Fredric March and Kim Novak
1959	The Wonderful Country	Texas Ranger Capt. Rucker	
1959	Suddenly, Last Summer	Dr. Lawrence J. Hockstader	
1965	Once Upon a Tractor	Colonel	short
1966	Gammera, the Invincible	Secretary of Defense	
1967	Come Spy with Me	Walter Ludeker	
1969	The Wild Bunch	Pat Harrigan	Released posthumously; (final film role)

Television
Year	Title	Role	Notes
1951	Pulitzer Prize Playhouse	George Washington	episode: "Valley Forge"
1952	Studio One	Billy Bones	episode: "Treasure Island"
1955	Goodyear Television Playhouse		episode: "The Chivington Raid"
1956	Climax!	Brewster	episode: "Fear Is the Hunter"
1959	Decoy	Otto Flagler	episode: "High Swing"
1960	The Witness	Jimmy Hines	episode: "Jimmy Hines"
1961	Route 66	Frank Ivy	episode: "The Newborn"
1964	Kraft Suspense Theatre	Karl Hesse	episode: "The World I Want"
1965	Seaway	Captain Marland	episode: "The 34th Man"
1965	Rawhide	Josh Breeden & Jonas Bolt	episodes: Josh & Crossing at White Feather
1965	The Trials of O'Brien	George Brewer	episode: "Bargain Day on the Street of Regret"
1966	Mission: Impossible	Colonel Shtemenko	episode: "The Short Tail Spy"
1966	Death of a Salesman	Uncle Ben	CBS-TV production
1967	The Man from U.N.C.L.E.	Harry Beldon	episode: "The Summit-Five Affair"
1968	Run for Your Life	Sir Harry Hiller	episode: "A Dangerous Proposal"
1968	Bonanza	Barney Sturgess	episode: "The Bottle Fighter"
1968	I Spy	Indris	episode: "Shana"

== Sources ==
- Lamparski, R. (1981) Lamparsaki's Hidden Hollywood, Simon & Schuster: New York. ISBN 0671418858.
- Monush, B. (2003) Screen World Presents the Encyclopedia of Hollywood Film Actors: From the Silent Era to 1965, Applause Theatre & Cinema Books: New York. ISBN 1-55783-551-9.

California Assembly
Preceded by Franklin J. Potter	California State Assemblyman, 57th District; January 8, 1945 – January 6, 1947	Succeeded by Charles J. Conrad
