= California's 57th State Assembly district =

American legislative district

Current assemblymember
| Sade Elhawary; D–Los Angeles |
- Population (2010) • Voting age • Citizen voting age: 465,845; 344,852; 268,696
- Demographics: 18.18% White; 1.65% Black; 67.74% Latino; 11.39% Asian; 0.37% Native American; 0.19% Hawaiian/Pacific Islander; 0.20% other; 0.28% remainder of multiracial
- Registered voters: 239,950
- Registration: 48.47% Democratic; 23.31% Republican; 23.70% No party preference

California's 57th State Assembly district is one of 80 California State Assembly districts. It is currently represented by Democrat Sade Elhawary of Los Angeles.

== District profile ==
The district encompasses an eastern portion of the Gateway Cities region as well as South Los Angeles. The district is primarily suburban and heavily Latino.

Los Angeles County – 4.7%

- Avocado Heights
- East La Mirada
- Hacienda Heights
- Industry – 93.6%
- La Habra Heights
- La Mirada
- La Puente
- Norwalk – 62.2%
- Santa Fe Springs
- South El Monte – 72.6%
- South San Jose Hills
- South Whittier
- West Whittier-Los Nietos
- Whittier

== Election results from statewide races ==
| Year | Office | Results |
|---|---|---|
| 2020 | President | Biden 63.4 – 34.5% |
| 2018 | Governor | Newsom 64.2 – 35.8% |
| 2018 | Senator | Feinstein 54.3 – 45.7% |
| 2016 | President | Clinton 65.8 – 28.4% |
| 2016 | Senator | Sanchez 54.3 – 45.7% |
| 2014 | Governor | Brown 58.8 – 41.2% |
| 2012 | President | Obama 63.7 – 34.0% |
| 2012 | Senator | Feinstein 65.7 – 34.3% |

== List of assembly members representing the district ==
Due to redistricting, the 57th district has been moved around different parts of the state. The current iteration resulted from the 2021 redistricting by the California Citizens Redistricting Commission.

| Assembly members | Party | Years served | Counties represented | Notes |
|---|---|---|---|---|
| George Washington Tully Carter | Republican | January 5, 1885 – January 3, 1887 | Contra Costa | |
| David N. Sherburne | Republican | January 3, 1887 – January 7, 1889 | Contra Costa | |
| Henry Hook | Republican | January 7, 1889 – January 5, 1891 | Contra Costa | |
| George E. Carter | Republican | January 5, 1891 – January 2, 1893 | Contra Costa | |
| Frank H. Gould | Democratic | January 2, 1893 – January 7, 1895 | Merced, Stanislaus | |
| Lovell Alexander Richards | Republican | January 7, 1895 – January 4, 1897 | Merced, Stanislaus | |
| John G. Elliott | Fusion | January 4, 1897 – January 2, 1899 | Merced, Stanislaus | |
| G. R. Stewart | Democratic | January 2, 1899 – January 1, 1901 | Merced, Stanislaus | |
| James W. Haley | Democratic | January 1, 1901 – January 5, 1903 | Merced, Stanislaus | |
| Marshall Black | Republican | January 5, 1903 – January 2, 1905 | Santa Clara | |
| Fayette Mitcheltree | Republican | January 2, 1905 – January 7, 1907 | Santa Clara | |
| Charles C. Spalding | Republican | January 7, 1907 – January 4, 1909 | Santa Clara | |
| Daniel R. Hayes | Republican | January 4, 1909 – January 6, 1913 | Santa Clara | |
| George Hatch Johnson | Republican | January 6, 1913 – January 8, 1917 | San Bernardino | |
| Crombie Allen | Republican | January 8, 1917 – January 3, 1921 | San Bernardino | |
| Issac Jones | Republican | January 3, 1921 – January 5, 1931 | San Bernardino | |
| Charles W. Dempster | Republican | January 5, 1931 – January 2, 1933 | Los Angeles | |
| Kent H. Redwine | Republican | January 2, 1933 – January 6, 1941 | Los Angeles | |
| Franklin J. Potter | Republican | January 6, 1941 – January 8, 1945 | Los Angeles | |
| Albert Dekker | Democratic | January 8, 1945 – January 6, 1947 | Los Angeles | |
| Charles J. Conrad | Republican | January 6, 1947 – January 8, 1973 | Los Angeles | |
| Howard Berman | Democratic | January 8, 1973 – November 30, 1974 | Los Angeles | |
| Mike Cullen | Democratic | December 2, 1974 – November 30, 1978 | Los Angeles | |
| Dave Elder | Democratic | December 4, 1978 – November 30, 1992 | Los Angeles | |
| Hilda Solis | Democratic | December 7, 1992 – November 30, 1994 | Los Angeles | |
| Martin Gallegos | Democratic | December 5, 1994 – November 30, 2000 | Los Angeles | |
| Ed Chavez | Democratic | December 4, 2000 – November 30, 2006 | Los Angeles | |
| Ed Hernandez | Democratic | December 4, 2006 – November 30, 2010 | Los Angeles | |
| Roger Hernández | Democratic | December 6, 2010 – November 30, 2012 | Los Angeles | |
| Ian Calderon | Democratic | December 3, 2012 – November 30, 2020 | Los Angeles | |
| Lisa Calderon | Democratic | December 7, 2020 – November 30, 2022 | Los Angeles | |
| Reggie Jones-Sawyer | Democratic | December 5, 2022 – November 30, 2024 | Los Angeles | |
| Sade Elhawary | Democratic | December 2, 2024 – present | Los Angeles | |

== Election results (1990–present) ==
=== 2024 ===
2024 California State Assembly 57th district election
Primary election
| Party | Candidate | Votes | % |
|---|---|---|---|
| Democratic | Efren Martinez | 8,891 | 32.7 |
| Democratic | Sade Elhawary | 8,443 | 31.1 |
| Democratic | Dulce Vasquez | 3,648 | 13.4 |
| Democratic | Greg Akili | 3,088 | 11.4 |
| Democratic | Tara Perry | 3,083 | 11.4 |
| Total votes | | 27,153 | 100.0 |
General election
| Democratic | Sade Elhawary | 54,117 | 61.1 |
| Democratic | Efren Martinez | 34,506 | 38.9 |
| Total votes | | 88,623 | 100.0 |
| Democratic hold | | | |

=== 2022 ===
2022 California State Assembly 57th district election
Primary election
| Party | Candidate | Votes | % |
|---|---|---|---|
| Democratic | Reggie Jones-Sawyer (incumbent) | 25,332 | 100.0 |
| Total votes | | 25,332 | 100.0 |
General election
| Democratic | Reggie Jones-Sawyer (incumbent) | 40,334 | 100.0 |
| Total votes | | 40,334 | 100.0 |
| Democratic hold | | | |

=== 2020 ===
2020 California State Assembly 57th district election
Primary election
| Party | Candidate | Votes | % |
|---|---|---|---|
| Republican | Jessica Martinez | 23,752 | 28.7 |
| Democratic | Lisa Calderon | 16,622 | 20.1 |
| Democratic | Sylvia Rubio | 14,123 | 17.1 |
| Democratic | Josue Alvarado | 11,361 | 13.7 |
| Democratic | Vanessa Tyson | 7,121 | 8.6 |
| Democratic | Primo Castro | 3,156 | 3.8 |
| Democratic | Gary Mendez | 2,799 | 3.4 |
| Democratic | Dora Sandoval | 2,445 | 3.0 |
| Democratic | Oscar Valladares | 1,297 | 1.6 |
| Total votes | | 82,676 | 100.0 |
General election
| Democratic | Lisa Calderon | 114,122 | 60.5 |
| Republican | Jessica Martinez | 74,371 | 39.5 |
| Total votes | | 188,493 | 100.0 |
| Democratic hold | | | |

=== 2018 ===
2018 California State Assembly 57th district election
Primary election
| Party | Candidate | Votes | % |
|---|---|---|---|
| Democratic | Ian Calderon (incumbent) | 27,136 | 46.6 |
| Republican | Jessica Martinez | 13,824 | 23.7 |
| Republican | Oscar J. Llamas | 9,025 | 15.5 |
| Democratic | Justin Joshua Valero | 6,829 | 11.7 |
| Democratic | Blake Sullivan Carter | 1,393 | 2.4 |
| Total votes | | 57,331 | 100.0 |
General election
| Democratic | Ian Calderon (incumbent) | 84,159 | 64.9 |
| Republican | Jessica Martinez | 45,492 | 35.1 |
| Total votes | | 129,651 | 100.0 |
| Democratic hold | | | |

=== 2016 ===
2016 California State Assembly 57th district election
Primary election
| Party | Candidate | Votes | % |
|---|---|---|---|
| Democratic | Ian Calderon (incumbent) | 50,996 | 65.7 |
| Republican | Rita Topalian | 26,639 | 34.3 |
| Total votes | | 77,635 | 100.0 |
General election
| Democratic | Ian Calderon (incumbent) | 93,339 | 62.7 |
| Republican | Rita Topalian | 55,577 | 37.3 |
| Total votes | | 148,916 | 100.0 |
| Democratic hold | | | |

=== 2014 ===
2014 California State Assembly 57th district election
Primary election
| Party | Candidate | Votes | % |
|---|---|---|---|
| Republican | Rita Topalian | 15,859 | 52.2 |
| Democratic | Ian Calderon (incumbent) | 14,544 | 47.8 |
| Total votes | | 30,403 | 100.0 |
General election
| Democratic | Ian Calderon (incumbent) | 32,284 | 51.5 |
| Republican | Rita Topalian | 30,397 | 48.5 |
| Total votes | | 62,681 | 100.0 |
| Democratic hold | | | |

=== 2012 ===
2012 California State Assembly 57th district election
Primary election
| Party | Candidate | Votes | % |
|---|---|---|---|
| Republican | Noel A. Jaimes | 17,025 | 43.8 |
| Democratic | Ian Calderon | 11,100 | 28.5 |
| Democratic | Rudy Bermudez | 10,763 | 27.7 |
| Total votes | | 38,888 | 100.0 |
General election
| Democratic | Ian Calderon | 86,644 | 63.5 |
| Republican | Noel A. Jaimes | 49,832 | 36.5 |
| Total votes | | 136,476 | 100.0 |
| Democratic hold | | | |

=== 2010 ===
2010 California State Assembly 57th district election
| Party | Candidate | Votes | % |
|---|---|---|---|
| Democratic | Roger Hernandez | 52,763 | 67.2 |
| Republican | Brian A. Gutierrez | 25,699 | 32.6 |
| Independent | Mike Meza (write-in) | 163 | 0.2 |
| Total votes | | 78,625 | 100.0 |
| Democratic hold | | | |

=== 2008 ===
2008 California State Assembly 57th district election
| Party | Candidate | Votes | % |
|---|---|---|---|
| Democratic | Edward Hernandez (incumbent) | 71,953 | 66.3 |
| Republican | Victor Saldana | 36,576 | 33.7 |
| Total votes | | 108,529 | 100.0 |
| Democratic hold | | | |

=== 2006 ===
2006 California State Assembly 57th district election
| Party | Candidate | Votes | % |
|---|---|---|---|
| Democratic | Edward Hernandez | 44,025 | 63.1 |
| Republican | Holly Carver | 25,790 | 36.9 |
| Total votes | | 69,815 | 100.0 |
| Democratic hold | | | |

=== 2004 ===
2004 California State Assembly 57th district election
| Party | Candidate | Votes | % |
|---|---|---|---|
| Democratic | Ed Chavez (incumbent) | 72,860 | 68.5 |
| Republican | Victor M. Valenzuela, Jr. | 33,494 | 31.5 |
| Total votes | | 106,354 | 100.0 |
| Democratic hold | | | |

=== 2002 ===
2002 California State Assembly 57th district election
| Party | Candidate | Votes | % |
|---|---|---|---|
| Democratic | Ed Chavez (incumbent) | 39,341 | 65.0 |
| Republican | Anne M. Moll | 19,677 | 32.5 |
| Libertarian | Leland Thomas Faegre | 1,520 | 2.5 |
| Total votes | | 60,538 | 100.0 |
| Democratic hold | | | |

=== 2000 ===
2000 California State Assembly 57th district election
| Party | Candidate | Votes | % |
|---|---|---|---|
| Democratic | Ed Chavez | 56,710 | 73.3 |
| Republican | Katherine Licari Venturoso | 20,675 | 26.7 |
| Total votes | | 77,385 | 100.0 |
| Democratic hold | | | |

=== 1998 ===
1998 California State Assembly 57th district election
| Party | Candidate | Votes | % |
|---|---|---|---|
| Democratic | Martin Gallegos (incumbent) | 40,578 | 72.1 |
| Republican | Henry E. Gonzales | 15,722 | 27.9 |
| Total votes | | 56,300 | 100.0 |
| Democratic hold | | | |

=== 1996 ===
1996 California State Assembly 57th district election
| Party | Candidate | Votes | % |
|---|---|---|---|
| Democratic | Martin Gallegos (incumbent) | 46,841 | 69.8 |
| Republican | Jim Kleinpell | 20,370 | 30.3 |
| Total votes | | 67,211 | 100.0 |
| Democratic hold | | | |

=== 1994 ===
1994 California State Assembly 57th district election
| Party | Candidate | Votes | % |
|---|---|---|---|
| Democratic | Martin Gallegos | 34,228 | 61.6 |
| Republican | Frank Yik | 18,910 | 34.0 |
| Libertarian | David Carl Argall | 2,417 | 4.4 |
| Total votes | | 55,555 | 100.0 |
| Democratic hold | | | |

=== 1992 ===
1992 California State Assembly 57th district election
| Party | Candidate | Votes | % |
|---|---|---|---|
| Democratic | Hilda Solis | 44,078 | 60.9 |
| Republican | Gary Woods | 24,824 | 34.3 |
| Libertarian | Bruce Dovner | 3,529 | 4.9 |
| Total votes | | 72,431 | 100.0 |
| Democratic hold | | | |

=== 1990 ===
1990 California State Assembly 57th district election
| Party | Candidate | Votes | % |
|---|---|---|---|
| Democratic | Dave Elder (incumbent) | 32,024 | 67.2 |
| Republican | Rodney D. Guarneri | 15,653 | 32.8 |
| Total votes | | 47,677 | 100.0 |
| Democratic hold | | | |

== See also ==
- California State Assembly
- California State Assembly districts
- Districts in California
