= Franklin J. Potter =

American politician

Member of the California State Assembly from the 57th district
- In office January 6, 1941 - January 8, 1945
- Preceded by: Kent H. Redwine
- Succeeded by: Albert Dekker

Personal details
- Born: October 6, 1898 Rising City, Nebraska, US
- Died: May 16, 1981 (aged 82) Frankfurt, West Germany
- Party: Republican
- Spouse(s): Grace A Styer (m. 1922; died 1924) Alta McLean Clifford (m. 1930, divorced)

Military service
- Branch/service: United States Army
- Battles/wars: World War I

Franklin John Potter (October 6, 1898 - May 16, 1981) served in the California State Assembly representing the 57th district from 1941 to 1945 and during World War I he served in the United States Army.
