= Dave Elder (politician) =

American politician

Member of the California State Assembly from the 57th district
- In office December 4, 1978 – November 30, 1992
- Preceded by: Mike Cullen
- Succeeded by: Hilda Solis

Personal details
- Born: February 10, 1942 (age 84) Los Angeles, California
- Party: Democratic
- Spouse: Muriel Gilmour
- Children: 4
- Occupation: Budget analyst

David A. Elder (born February 10, 1942) is an American politician in the state of California. He served in the California State Assembly for the 57th district from 1978 to 1992.

In 1992, Elder sought reelection to the state Assembly. However, redistricting merged his district with that of fellow Democratic Assemblyman Richard Floyd into a new district centered in and around the city of Carson. While they spent most of the Democratic primary campaign bashing each other, then-Carson Councilwoman Juanita Millender-McDonald wound up winning the contest and went on to win the general election.

In 1994, Elder sought election to the state Board of Equalization but managed only 8% of the vote, despite raising more than $20,000 on his own, in the Democratic primary.

in 1995, Elder was caught up in a controversy over alleged violation of state law. A probate referee in Orange County, appointed by Lieutenant Governor Gray Davis, stepped down because state law bars anyone from taking a partisan state office who raised more than $200 for a candidate in the past two years. In an interview Elder expressed his dismay at the state law claiming that it was never intended to apply to referee applicants who raised the money for their own elections.
