= Hilda Solis =

American politician (born 1957)

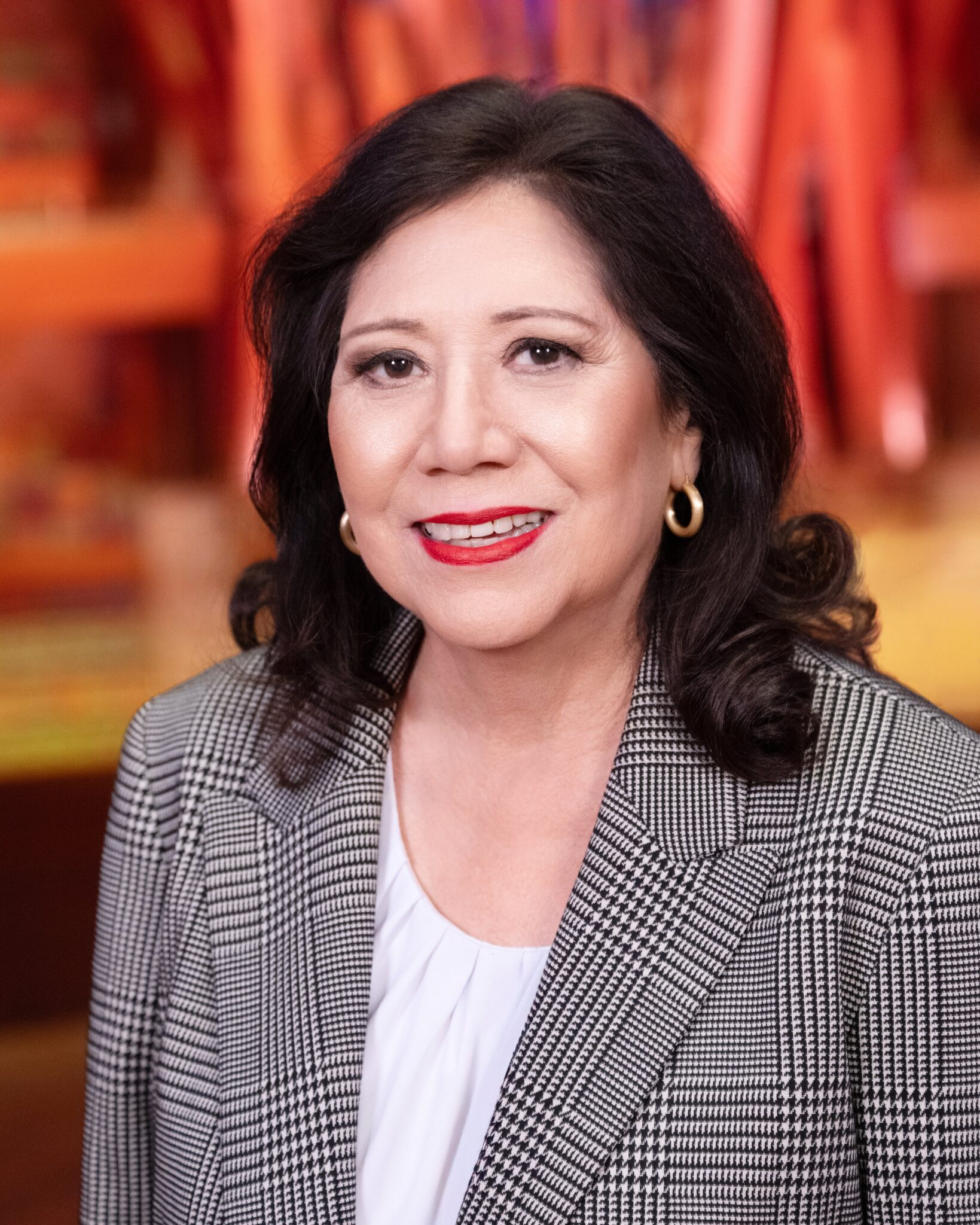
- Official portrait, 2025

Member-elect of the U.S. House of Representatives from California
- Assuming office January 3, 2027
- Succeeding: Linda Sánchez (redistricted)
- Constituency: 38th district
- In office January 3, 2001 – February 24, 2009
- Preceded by: Matthew G. Martínez
- Succeeded by: Judy Chu
- Constituency: 31st district (2001–2003); 32nd district (2003–2009)

Chair of Los Angeles County
- Incumbent
- Assumed office December 2, 2025
- Preceded by: Kathryn Barger
- In office December 8, 2020 – December 7, 2021
- Preceded by: Kathryn Barger
- Succeeded by: Holly Mitchell
- In office December 8, 2015 – December 6, 2016
- Preceded by: Michael D. Antonovich (Mayor)
- Succeeded by: Mark Ridley-Thomas

Member of the Los Angeles County Board of Supervisors from the 1st district
- Incumbent
- Assumed office December 1, 2014
- Preceded by: Gloria Molina

25th United States Secretary of Labor
- In office February 24, 2009 – January 22, 2013
- President: Barack Obama
- Deputy: Seth Harris
- Preceded by: Elaine Chao
- Succeeded by: Tom Perez

Member of the California State Senate from the 24th district
- In office December 5, 1994 – December 31, 2000
- Preceded by: Arthur Torres
- Succeeded by: Gloria Romero

Member of the California State Assembly from the 57th district
- In office December 7, 1992 – November 30, 1994
- Preceded by: Dave Elder
- Succeeded by: Martin Gallegos

Personal details
- Born: Hilda Lucia Solis; October 20, 1957 (age 69) Los Angeles, California, U.S.
- Party: Democratic
- Spouse: Sam H. Sayyad
- Education: California State Polytechnic University, Pomona (BA); University of Southern California (MPA)

Hilda Lucia Solis (/soʊˈliːs/; born October 20, 1957) is an American politician and member-elect of the United States House of Representatives for the 38th congressional district of California. Solis is the outgoing member of the Los Angeles County Board of Supervisors for the 1st district and is the Chair of Los Angeles County. Solis previously served as the 25th United States Secretary of Labor from 2009 to 2013, as part of the administration of President Barack Obama. She is a member of the Democratic Party and previously served in the House of Representatives from 2001 to 2009, representing the 31st and 32nd congressional districts of California that include East Los Angeles and the San Gabriel Valley.

Solis was raised in La Puente, California, by immigrant farmers from Nicaragua and Mexico. She earned degrees from the California State Polytechnic University, Pomona and the University of Southern California and worked for two federal agencies in Washington, D.C. Returning to her native state, she was elected to the Rio Hondo Community College Board of Trustees in 1985, the California State Assembly in 1992, and the California State Senate in 1994. She was the first Hispanic woman to serve in the State Senate, and was reelected there in 1998. Solis sought to pass environmental justice legislation. She was the first female recipient of the John F. Kennedy Profile in Courage Award in 2000.

Solis defeated a long-time Democratic incumbent as part of getting elected to the U.S. House of Representatives in 2000, where she focused mainly on labor causes and environmental work. She was reelected easily to four subsequent terms. In December 2008, President-elect Barack Obama announced his intention to nominate Solis as the next Secretary of Labor. She took office after being confirmed by the United States Senate in February 2009, becoming the first Latina to lead one of the United States federal executive departments. There she focused on workplace safety issues and on strengthening compliance with wage and hour laws. In January 2013, Solis stepped down from her post as Labor Secretary.

Returning to the area of her upbringing, in April 2014, Solis formally announced a campaign for a seat on the non-partisan Los Angeles County Board of Supervisors. Solis won the seat outright in a June 3 election and was sworn in on December 1. As Supervisor, Solis successfully lobbied the state to allocate funds for the Exide battery plant cleanup. One of her areas of responsibility was Downtown Los Angeles, where her main priority was dealing with gentrification and the lack of affordable housing. She was unopposed for re-election as Supervisor, which took place in June 2018. She served one-year terms as county chair from 2015 to 2016 and again from 2020 to 2021.

== Early life and education ==
Solis was born in Los Angeles, California, as the daughter of immigrant parents who had met in citizenship class and married in 1953: Juana Sequeira (b. 1926, from Nicaragua) and Raúl Solís (from Mexico). Her father was a Teamsters shop steward in Mexico and, after coming to the United States, worked at the Quemetco battery recycling plant in the City of Industry in the San Gabriel Valley. There he again organized for the Teamsters, to gain better health care benefits for workers, but also contracted lead poisoning. Her mother worked for over 20 years on the assembly line of Mattel once her children were all of school age, belonged to the United Rubber Workers, and was outspoken about working conditions. She stressed the importance of education and was a devout Roman Catholic. Her Catholic faith, she said, "is a part of my life. My faith is what motivates me."

Hilda Solis is the third oldest of seven siblings (four sisters, two brothers) and grew up in a tract home in La Puente, California. She had to help raise her youngest siblings, and later said of her childhood: "It wasn't what you would call the all-American life for a young girl growing up. We had to mature very quickly." She graduated from La Puente High School, where she saw a lack of support for those wishing to continue their education, including a guidance counselor who told her mother that "Your daughter is not college material. Maybe she should follow the career of her older sister and become a secretary." However, another counselor did encourage her to attend college, and even went to her house to help her fill out an application. She took her younger sisters to the library to get them to follow her lead.

She was the first of her family to go to college, being accepted into the Educational Opportunity Program (which assists low-income, first-generation college students) at California State Polytechnic University, Pomona (Cal Poly Pomona) and paying for it with the help of government grants and part-time jobs. She graduated in 1979 with a Bachelor of Arts in political science. She then earned a Master of Public Administration degree at the University of Southern California in 1981.

== Early career ==
Solis served near the end of the Carter Administration in the White House Office of Hispanic Affairs, where she was editor-in-chief of a newsletter during a 1980–1981 Washington semester internship as part of her master's program. At the start of the Reagan Administration in 1981, she became a management analyst at the civil rights division of the Office of Management and Budget, but her dislike for Ronald Reagan's policies motivated her to leave later that year.

In Washington, she met Sam H. Sayyad, whom she subsequently married. He owns an automobile repair center in Irwindale, California. The couple lives in a modest house in El Monte, California, not far from where she grew up.

Returning to California, Solis became director of the California Student Opportunity and Access Program in 1982, to help disadvantaged youth gain necessary preparation for college. In particular, she worked with the Whittier Union High School District. Friends urged her to try for elective office, and so in 1985, she ran for the board of trustees of the Rio Hondo Community College District. She campaigned hard and overtook an incumbent and one other better established candidate to become the top placer. She was reelected in 1989. During her time on the board, she worked towards improved vocational job training at the college and sought to increase the number of tenured faculty positions held by minorities and women. She joined several California chambers of commerce, women's organizations, and Latino organizations. She gained added political visibility in 1991 when she was named to the Los Angeles County Commission on Insurance by Los Angeles County Supervisor Gloria Molina, a political mentor. Solis also served as chief of staff for State Senator Art Torres.

== California State Legislature ==
=== State Assembly ===
Solis had the opportunity to run for the California State Assembly when, after California's 1991 redistricting, the incumbent Dave Elder in Solis's 57th State Assembly district was shifted into another district, while her new representative retired. In the June 1992 Democratic primary to fill the open seat, Solis's opponents had the endorsement of powerful State Assemblyman Richard Polanco and the former incumbent. Solis had the support of Molina and U.S. Representative Barbara Boxer, in an effort that focused on door-to-door campaigning and featured Solis's mother making burritos for campaign volunteers. Solis came out on top of a three-way Democratic race, receiving 49 percent of the vote and besting her nearest competitor, future State Assemblyman Ed Chavez, who received 31 percent. In the general election, Solis garnered 61 percent of the vote against Republican Gary Woods's 34 percent, and gained election to the State Assembly. She was one of seven Latinos who won election to the State Assembly in the wake of the redistricting and became collectively known as Los Siete. Solis was among the most liberal of this ideologically diverse group.

In her one term in the State Assembly, Solis was prominent in the debate on illegal immigration to the United States, backing a bill to allow undocumented immigrants to attend California colleges as long as they were residing in the state. She backed labor unions and opposed the tobacco industry in supporting a bill that banned smoking in all workplaces. She served on committees dealing with education, labor, and environmental issues, including a new committee that dealt with groundwater contamination and landfill leakage. She was not known as a strong orator.

=== State Senate ===
The Democratic incumbent in Solis's 24th State Senate district, Art Torres, gave up his office when he received the 1994 Democratic nomination for the statewide office of California Insurance Commissioner. Solis ran for the seat, won the Democratic primary with 63 percent of the vote against two opponents, and then won the 1994 general election with 63 percent of the vote against Republican Dave Boyer's 33 percent. She became the first Hispanic woman to ever serve in the State Senate and the first woman ever to represent the San Gabriel Valley; she was also the Senate's youngest member at that time. She was reelected in 1998 with 74 percent of the vote.

In the State Senate, Solis authored 17 bills to prevent domestic violence and championed labor, education, and health care issues. She described herself as "a big believer that government, if done right, can do a lot to improve the quality of people's lives". In 1995, she sponsored a bill to raise the minimum wage from $4.25 to $5.75; it was strongly opposed by business organizations and the restaurant industry. When Governor Pete Wilson vetoed it, she organized a successful drive to make the issue into a ballot initiative the next year, using $50,000 of her own campaign funds and rallying union support. The initiative's passing garnered her a statewide reputation and other states followed with similar initiatives. She chaired the labor committee and established herself as loyal to labor interests, but made a point of establishing working relationships with Republicans on the committee. Solis held high-profile hearings on labor law enforcement following a summer 1995 sweatshop raid in El Monte that discovered more than 70 Thai workers existing in slave-like conditions. She called garment manufacturers to explain themselves and pushed for tougher enforcement of anti-sweatshop laws. Republican state senator Ray Haynes later said that Solis was "a committed liberal in the pockets of labor", but Republican State Senate Leader Rob Hurtt said of her, "We obviously didn't see eye to eye. But she was respectful. I'll give her credit; she was a very hard worker and she knew her stuff."

Solis was an environmental activist in the State Senate, due to concerns that stemmed from a childhood spent within smelling distance of the Puente Hills Landfill and making frequent visits to the San Gabriel Mountains. In 1997, she worked to pass environmental justice legislation with a law to protect low-income and minority communities from newly located landfills, pollution sources, and other environmental hazards in neighborhoods that already had such sites. She got the bill, SB 1113, approved over the strong opposition of various business interests, water contractors, and some state government agencies, but Wilson vetoed it. She returned in 1999 with a compromise measure, which was signed by Governor Gray Davis. Calling for "the fair treatment of people of all races, cultures, and incomes with respect to the development, adoption, implementation, and enforcement of environmental laws", it represented the first legislation of its kind in the nation and is considered a landmark.

Solis faced controversy with her 1999 legislation, SB 63, that lowered the carpool restrictions on the El Monte Busway from three or more occupants to two or more. When this took effect in January 2000, it quickly resulted in greatly increased volume on the busway and protests from bus riders and prior carpoolers. Solis at first defended the change, but it continued to have a detrimental effect on the busway and did not improve flow in the regular traffic lanes. By May, she was co-sponsoring legislation to rescind the change and restore the higher occupancy requirement, which passed and took effect in July 2000.

Due to her work in overcoming obstacles for environmental justice, in 2000 Solis was given the Profile in Courage Award by the John F. Kennedy Library Foundation, and was praised as "a politician who hasn't shied away from challenging the old boy network both within and without the Latino community". She was the first woman to win the award, and gained appearances in George and People magazines and on the Today show. Art Torres, who had become California Democratic Party chair, said of Solis, "She's going to be a national star".

== U.S. House of Representatives ==
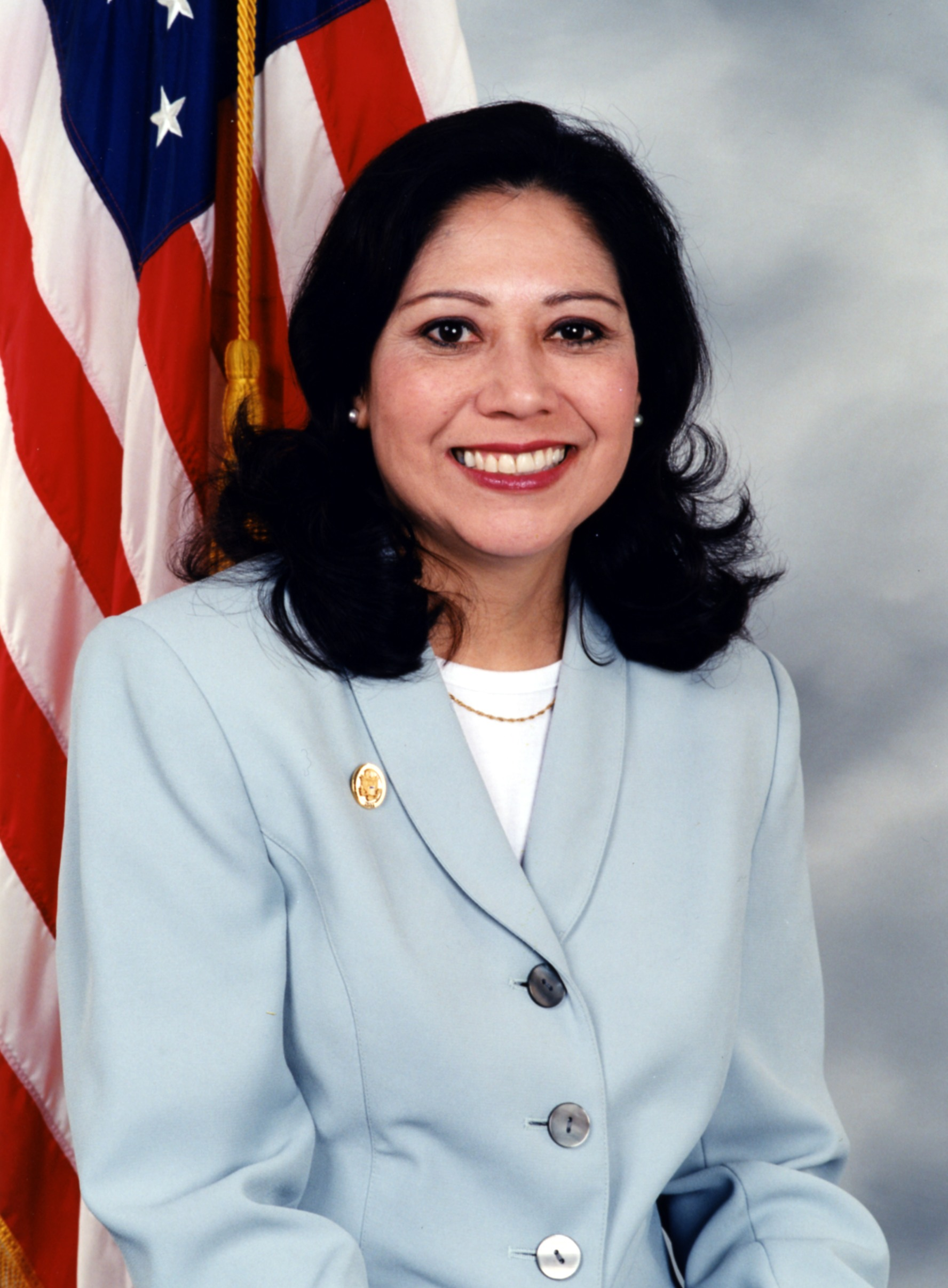
Solis' official portrait, as it appeared on her Congressional website in 2003

Term limits would have prevented Solis from seeking reelection to the State Senate. After months of deliberation, she decided to run for the U.S. House of Representatives in 2000 against 18-year incumbent Matthew G. Martínez in the 31st congressional district, which consisted largely of working class Hispanics and Asians. This action was criticized by Hispanics and others, and only two members of Congress, Barbara Boxer and Loretta Sanchez, supported her. Martínez was more moderate than many of his constituents, as he had supported the North American Free Trade Agreement (NAFTA), opposed gun control, and supported bans on specific abortion procedures. He was also criticized for lacking effort and neglecting his district. Solis was able to obtain the support of the Los Angeles County Federation of Labor (which called her a "warrior for working families"), Emily's List, Handgun Control Incorporation, the Sierra Club and the California League of Conservation Voters. With their help, Solis outspent Martínez by a 4-to-1 margin and had hundreds of volunteers working for her.

Solis defeated Martínez in the March 2000 Democratic primary by a 69 percent to 31 percent margin. On primary night, Martínez called Solis "obnoxious" and accused her of untruthful advertising. He subsequently switched to the Republican Party, and urged Latinos to vote against her, to no great effect. Without a Republican opponent in the general election, Solis beat three little-known challengers from minor parties and won 79 percent of the vote.

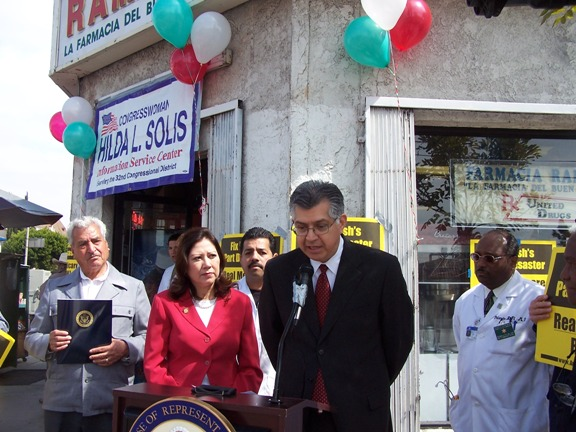
Solis at a 2006 appearance with local pharmacists concerned with Medicare Part D implementation

Upon arriving in the House of Representatives, Solis was named freshman class whip, making her responsible for collecting votes from first-term Democrats. National Journal magazine named her one of its "Ten Freshmen to Watch", and said that her election "is a sign of things to come in California and a generational changing of the guard in the Hispanic Caucus". Solis commissioned for her new office a painting of the United States Capitol with the San Gabriel Mountains behind it, so that she would not forget her roots. Her Washington apartment was tiny.

As congresswoman, Solis was most known for her work on environmental issues as a member of the Committee on Energy and Commerce, the Committee on Natural Resources, and the Select Committee on Energy Independence and Global Warming. She made the promotion of green-collar jobs a priority and sponsored the Southern California portion of the California Wild Heritage Act, which would create or enlarge many wilderness areas. In 2003, she sponsored legislation that funded a National Park Service study to designate a large swath of the Angeles National Forest, the Puente and Chino Hills, and the Rio Hondo and San Gabriel River, a National Recreation Area. (In 2013, after Solis had left the Obama administration, the Park Service recommended proceeding with a greatly reduced version of the original proposal; while other advocates evinced disappointment, Solis said it was still a positive step and that Congress could expand the area in whatever legislation it undertook.)

Solis was not a member of the Education and the Workforce Committee, but championed the Employee Free Choice Act and was the only member of Congress on the board of American Rights at Work, a pro-union organization that strongly supports the act, for whom she served as treasurer starting in 2004. On trade she voted against both the Dominican Republic–Central America trade agreement and the U.S.-Peru trade agreement, and also expressed opposition to a purposed bilateral U.S.-Colombia trade agreement, citing concerns about human rights violations. Solis opposed legislation that would soften job safety requirements. She received 100 percent ratings from several pro-labor groups for the years 2005 through 2007, and was a major recipient of union political donations. United Farm Workers co-founder Dolores Huerta is one of Solis's role models.

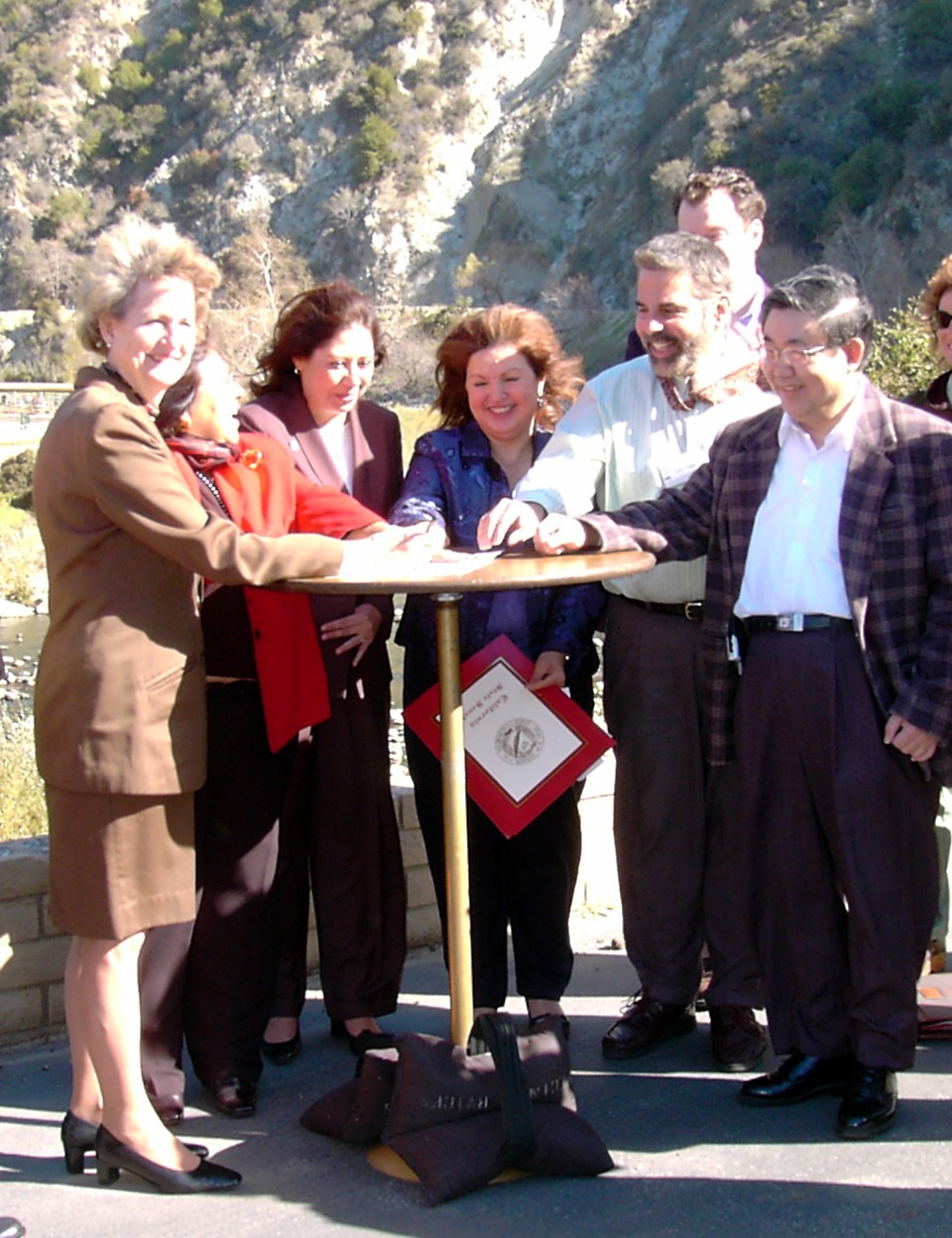
Solis (third from left) at a 2006 dedication ceremony for a conservation land acquisition along the San Gabriel River

During her tenure in the House, Solis was an advocate of comprehensive immigration reform. She was one of the leading opponents of H.R. 4437 a House bill sponsored by Wisconsin Congressman Jim Sensenbrenner and voted against it.

Solis supported legislation aimed at reducing the number of teen pregnancies within Latina and African American communities and sponsored a bill, that became law in 2003, that granted U.S. citizenship to immigrants after one year of military service instead of the previous three years.

Solis is Roman Catholic and pro-choice. Along with 47 other Catholic members of Congress, she sent a letter to Cardinal Theodore McCarrick of Washington, D.C., in order to dissuade him from refusing them the sacraments because of their pro-choice legislative voting. Solis signed a "Statement of Principles," stating her commitment to her faith as well as her disagreement with the Roman Catholic Church on some issues. They stated that on those issues, such as abortion rights, they decided to follow their conscience instead of the Church teachings.

Solis was a member of the Congressional Progressive Caucus and rated a lifetime "liberal quotient" of 99 percent from Americans for Democratic Action, and a lifetime 2 percent rating from the American Conservative Union. From 2006 to 2008 she wrote blog entries for The Huffington Post. Solis believed in the importance of mentoring, and as a House member continued relationships she had established with up-and-coming political figures in her district, including California State Assemblywoman Judy Chu and Monterey Park Mayor Sharon Martinez.

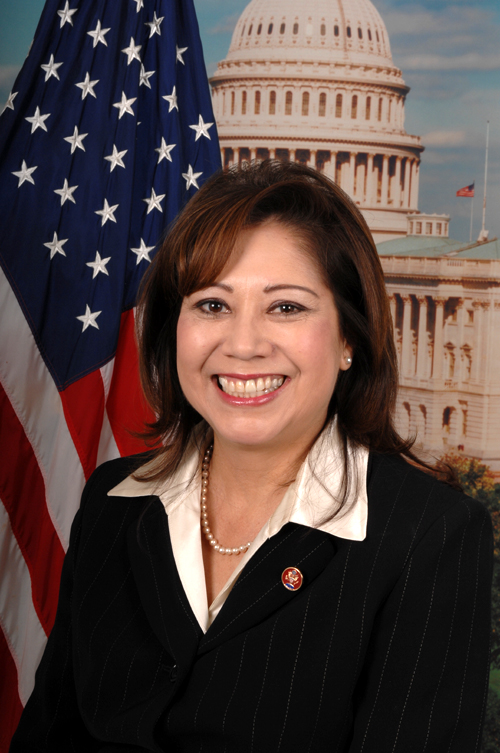
Solis's official Congressional portrait, 2007

After the 2000 census and subsequent redistricting, Solis's area became part of California's 32nd congressional district. She was reelected for additional terms in 2002, 2004, and 2006 by very large margins, twice with no Republican in opposition. She ran unopposed in 2008. Solis chaired the Health and the Environment Task Force of the Congressional Hispanic Caucus during the 110th Congress. However, during 2006 and 2007, Solis was part of a falling out between several female representatives and Joe Baca, leader of the Congressional Hispanic Caucus, arguing there was a "lack of respect afforded to women members of the Hispanic Caucus," which Baca denied. She had previously broken ties with the caucus' political action committee over its campaign contributions to Baca's sons. Baca responded that Solis "was a kiss-up" to House Speaker Nancy Pelosi, a remark for which he later apologized. Solis was indeed considered a close ally of Pelosi, which helped her get a seat on the Energy and Commerce Committee. She considered running for the position of Democratic Caucus Vice-Chairman for the 110th Congress, but deferred to incumbent John Larson after Rahm Emanuel chose to run for caucus chair, which Larson had been running for. Solis's aggressive fundraising for the Democratic Congressional Campaign Committee gained her a vice chair position on the Democratic Steering & Policy Committee. At the time of her selection to Obama's cabinet, she had been elected 2nd vice chair of the Hispanic Caucus and was considered a potential candidate for a leadership position in the House.

Solis was a strong supporter of Hillary Clinton's 2008 presidential bid; when that fell short, Barack Obama aggressively sought her support, as part of strengthening his appeal to Hispanic voters. She supported Clinton's effort to establish a U.S. Public Service Academy and was a co-sponsor of a House bill to create one. Solis did not become wealthy from her political career; by 2008, she and her husband's main assets consisted of retirement funds and his auto shop, valued at under $100,000.

== U.S. Secretary of Labor ==
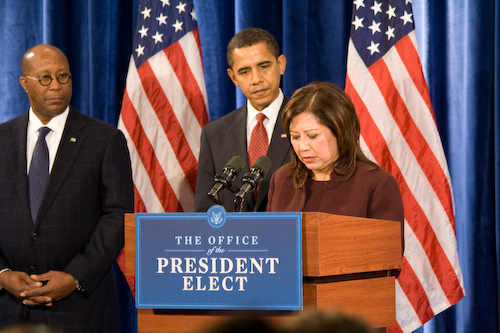
Solis speaks at the announcement of her being chosen as the new Secretary of Labor. President-elect Barack Obama and United States Trade Representative-to-be Ron Kirk look on.

On December 18, 2008, sources close to the Obama transition team identified Solis as the President-elect's choice for Secretary of Labor, the last cabinet position yet to be filled. The selection earned praise from the AFL-CIO and other labor organizations, but was not well received by business groups and the anti-union group Center for Union Facts. The official announcement was made by Obama on December 19. Solis's successor was chosen in a special election in California's 32nd congressional district; she declined to endorse a candidate in the primary (from which her past mentee Judy Chu emerged on top and eventually won the general election).

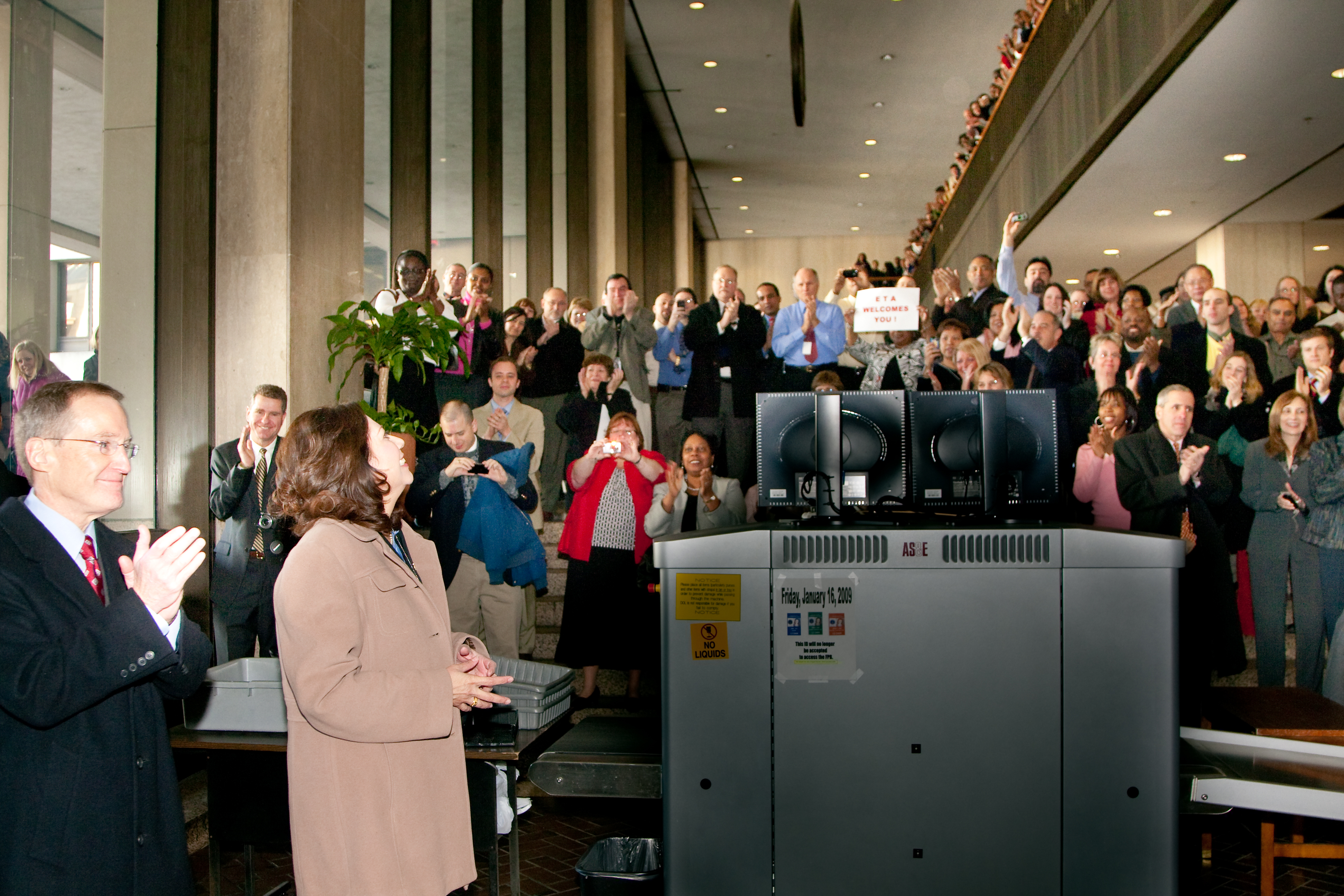
Secretary Solis is greeted on her first day of work at the Frances Perkins Building.

Solis's confirmation hearings were held on January 9, 2009, before the Senate Health, Education, Labor, and Pensions Committee. Committee chair Ted Kennedy repeatedly praised her, while, despite examination by Republican members, Solis declined to discuss specific policy issues, including the Employee Free Choice Act. Several days later, Senate Republicans said they might try to put a procedural hold on her nomination because of her unwillingness to answer questions in detail in the hearings. By January 23, a secret hold was placed on the nomination by an anonymous Republican. A series of written questions and responses between Republican members and Solis followed, during which she was more forthcoming. Republican Mike Enzi pressed her on whether her unpaid high-level positions at American Rights at Work constituted prohibited lobbying activity; Solis denied violation of rules of conduct and stated she had not helped lobbying. Solis did acknowledge that she had failed to report those positions on her annual House financial disclosure forms at the time, which a White House spokesperson argued was an unintentional oversight. On February 2, Obama appointed veteran Labor Department official Edward C. Hugler as Acting Secretary. The prolonged process was considered by some Republican aides to be a preview of future battles on labor issues between the Obama administration and Republicans in Congress.

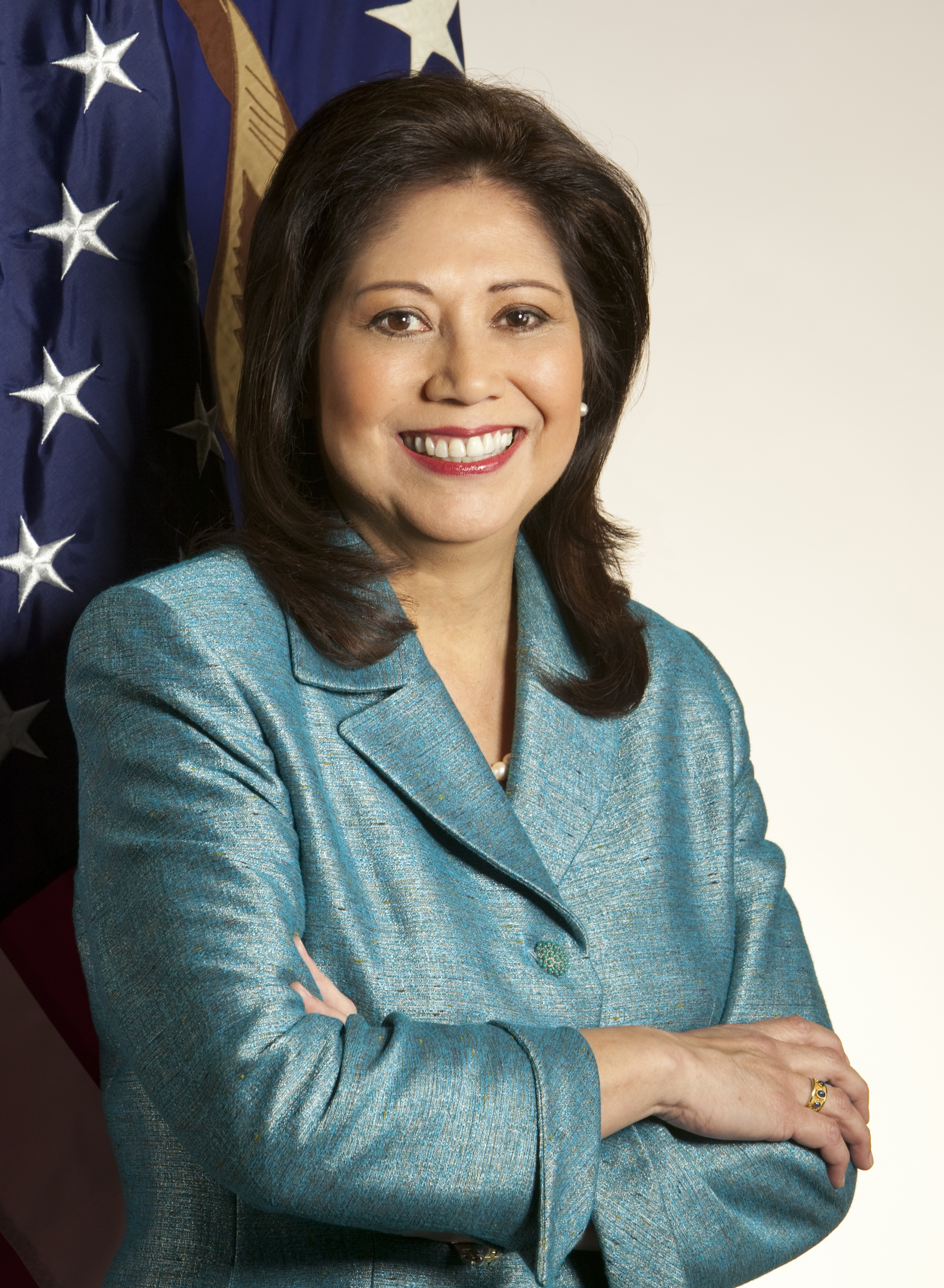
Official portrait as Secretary of Labor, 2009

A vote on Solis's committee confirmation was set on February 5, but postponed after news that Solis's husband Sam Sayyad had just paid $6,400 in outstanding state and local tax liens dating back to 1993 for his auto repair business. Sayyad had filed a separate tax return from Solis, and intended to contest the lien as they were for business taxes he believed to have already paid. A White House spokesperson stated Solis should not be penalized for any mistakes that her husband may have made. The revelations came in the wake of several other Obama nominations troubled or derailed due to tax issues. Committee Republicans subsequently indicated they would not blame Solis, but were still concerned about her ties to American Rights at Work. On February 11, 2009, the committee approved her nomination by voice vote with two votes opposed. After still further delays, Republicans agreed not to subject her nomination to a filibuster and on February 24, 2009, Solis was confirmed by the Senate by a vote of 80–17. She resigned from the House and was sworn into her new position that evening. (A ceremonial swearing in featuring Vice President Joe Biden was later held on March 13.)

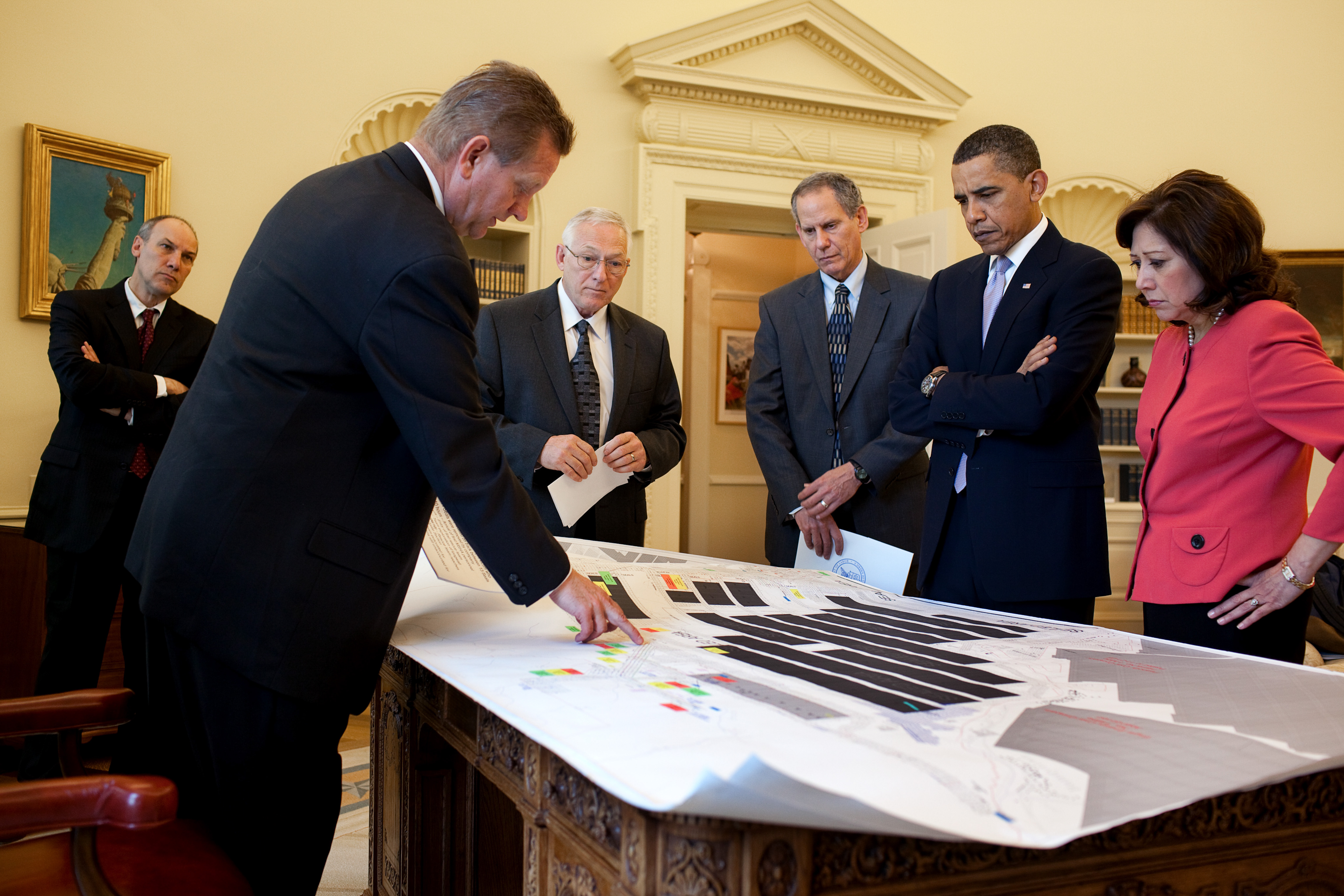
President Obama, Secretary Solis, and other officials examine a map showing the location of the Upper Big Branch Mine disaster in 2010

Solis became the first Hispanic woman to serve as a regular U.S. cabinet member and the first cabinet secretary with Central American descent. She also became the first Hispanic Secretary of Labor. Solis felt that under the George W. Bush administration, the department had become unimportant and lacking in power, and that its actions reflected a pro-business agenda. Accordingly, she hoped to reinvigorate it.

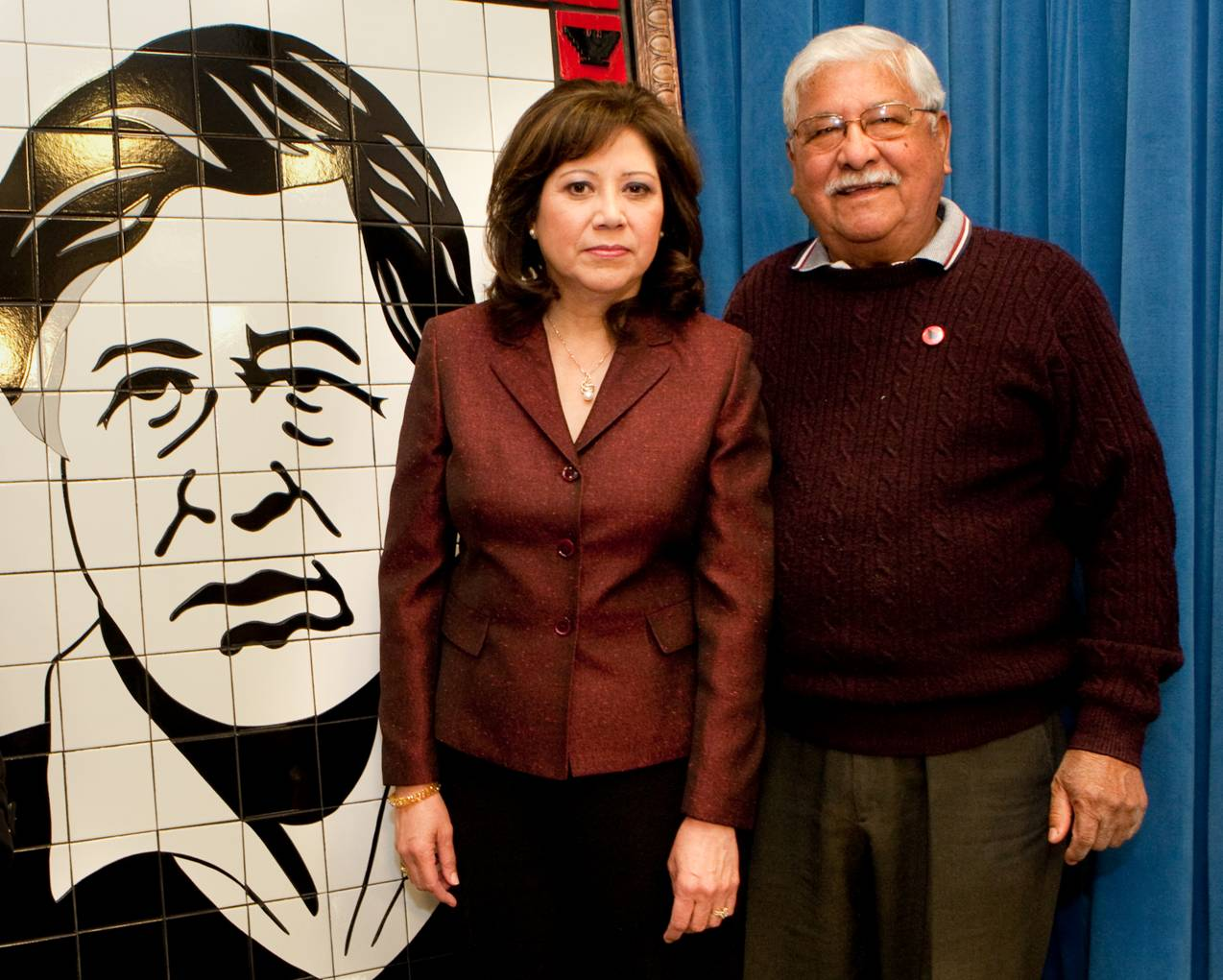
Secretary Solis with farm worker organizer Richard Chavez in 2010, next to a mural depicting his brother César Chávez

In her first days as secretary, Solis affirmed an extension to unemployment benefits specified by the 2009 Obama stimulus package, and joined Vice President Biden's Middle Class Task Force. In her first major speech as secretary, Solis pleased community forum attendees at Miami's Greater Bethel AME Church by vowing more aggressive enforcement of workplace protection laws, saying "You can rest assured that there is a new sheriff in town." In late March 2009, Solis vowed to add 250 investigators to the department's Wage and Hour Division after a Government Accountability Office report showed the division's enforcement of wage laws was quite inadequate; the staffing up was completed by the end of the year. In late May 2009, Solis suspended immigrant guest worker regulations related to H-2A visas adopted in the final days of the Bush administration; the move earned plaudits from the United Farm Workers. In July 2009, she expressed concern about workplace deaths among Hispanics, which she said they were especially vulnerable to (her continuing attention to issues such as this during her tenure would lead to Hispanic workers considering her their champion). In October 2009, the Occupational Safety and Health Administration levied the largest fine in its history on BP for failing to fix safety problems following the 2005 Texas City Refinery disaster. Business groups such as the National Federation of Independent Business complained that Solis was forging a less cooperative relationship, one that departed from the Bush administration's "compliance assistance" approach; the Labor Department said that compliance assistance was still an important part of the new strategy.

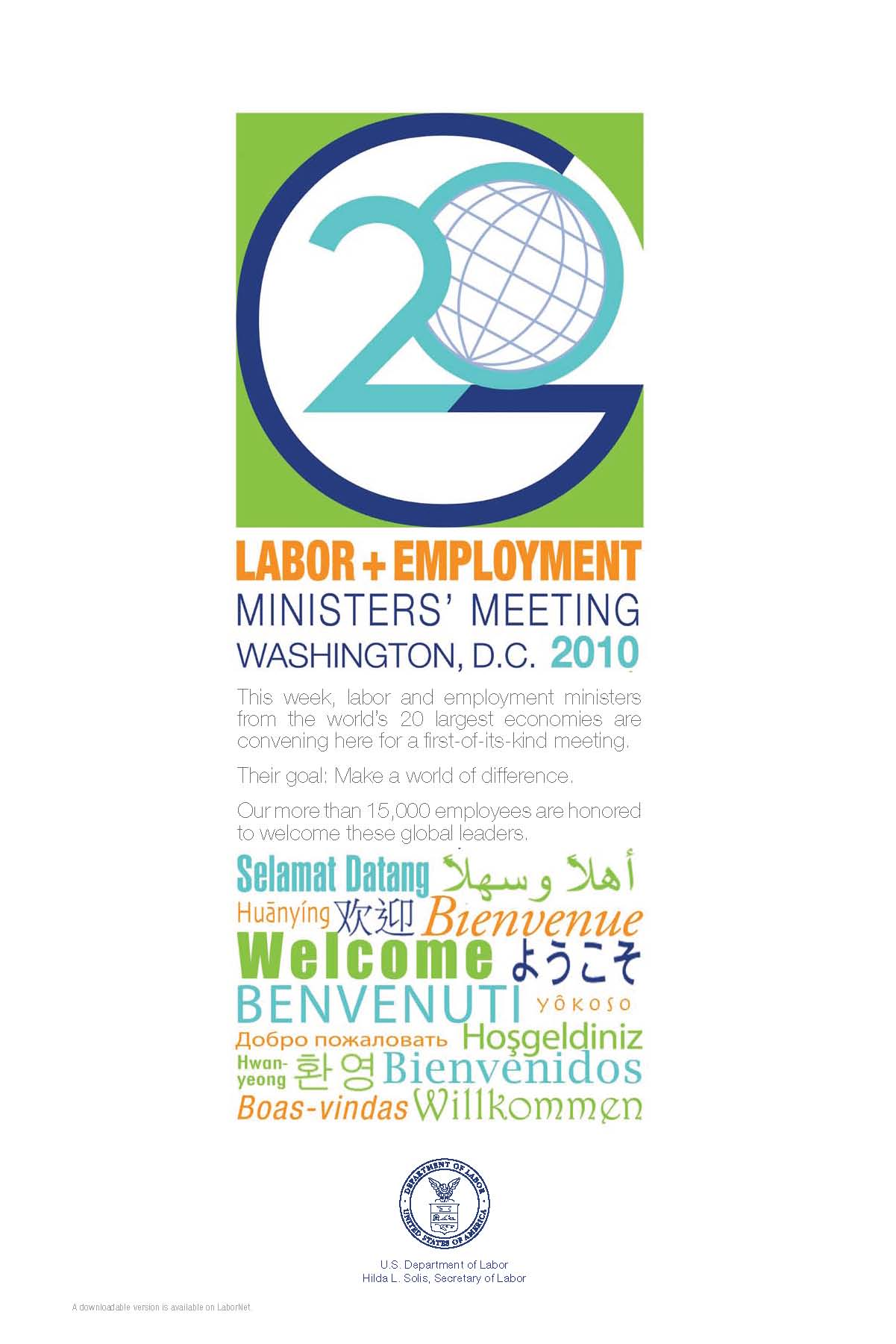
The April 2010 meeting of the G20 labor ministers at the Department of Labor was the first of its kind.

For 2010, Solis's agenda was to enact some ninety new rules and regulations intended to grant more power to unions and to workers. Whether Solis would try to revive Clinton administration ergonomics rules that had been discarded in the early days of the Bush administration, and that business groups continued to oppose, was unclear. In the wake of the Upper Big Branch Mine disaster in West Virginia in April 2010, the worst in the U.S. in forty years, Solis announced that the Labor Department's Mine Safety and Health Administration would conduct an internal review of its enforcement of the Massey Energy mine prior to the accident. She also requested that the National Institute for Occupational Safety and Health provide an independent analysis of that review. (By the end of her tenure, however, some safety experts said she had fallen short of getting any meaningful new regulatory scheme in place in the wake of the disaster.) Later that month, Solis and the department hosted the first-ever meeting of the G-20 labor ministers; they discussed how to accelerate job creation in their respective countries. Solis also faced disgruntlement from a local of the American Federation of Government Employees representing her own employees, who were unhappy that a longstanding flextime program reduced under the George W. Bush administration had not been restored. The department said the program was modern and fair and that it was part of ongoing contract negotiations with the local. The year also saw the department trying to crack down on firms that illegally use summer internships for free labor, by clarifying what may constitute an unpaid academic internship; the move brought resistance from universities. The year additionally saw Solis leading an administration campaign against farmers who employed children or underpaid workers. (Proposed new rules in this area were dropped in 2012, however, following adamant criticism from conservatives and agricultural groups.)

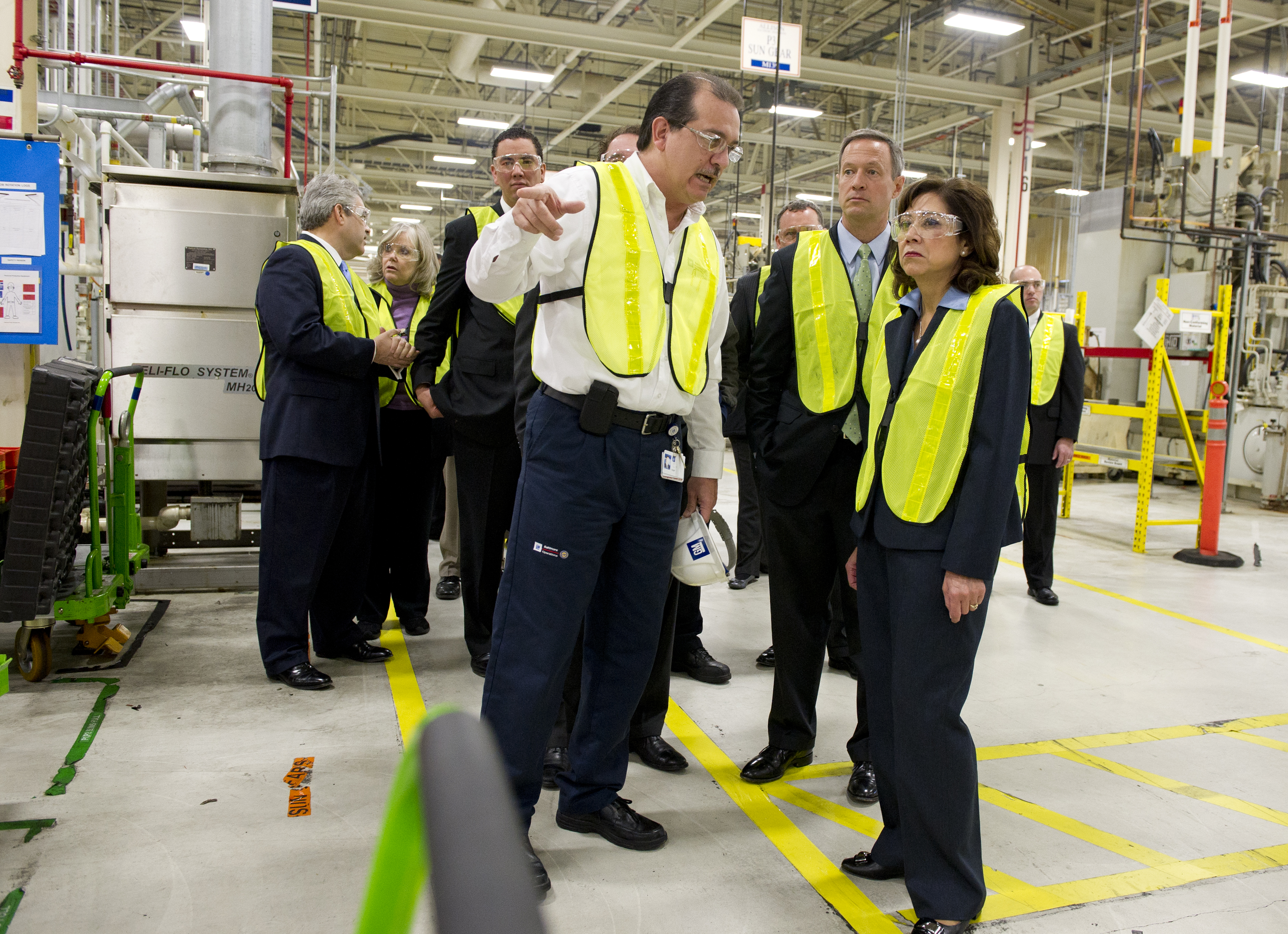
Secretary Solis touring a Maryland General Motors facility in 2012 with Governor Martin O'Malley

In February 2011, as protests continued over Wisconsin Governor Scott Walker's proposal to limit that state's public employee unions' collective bargaining rights, and similar proposals were made in other states, Solis spoke out strongly and emotionally against such moves, saying "[those governors] aren't just asking workers to tighten their belts, they're demanding they give up their uniquely American rights as workers." Overall, however, the Obama administration did not speak out forcefully against these moves.

In October 2012, Solis defended the work of the Bureau of Labor Statistics, after the Current Population Survey it puts out monthly reported that unemployment in the United States had fallen below eight percent for this first time since Obama took office. Some critics, including former General Electric CEO Jack Welch, charged that the number had been tampered with in order to benefit Obama one month before the U.S. presidential election. Solis said, "I'm insulted when I hear that because we have a very professional, civil service organization where you have top, top economists that work at the BLS. They've been doing these calculations. These are our best trained and best-skilled individuals working in the BLS, and it's really ludicrous to hear that kind of statement." For the year, the Labor Department set a record for the most back pay it had ever collected due to wage violations, $280 million going to some 300,000 workers. Workplace fatalities in construction and general industrial sectors reached an all-time low.

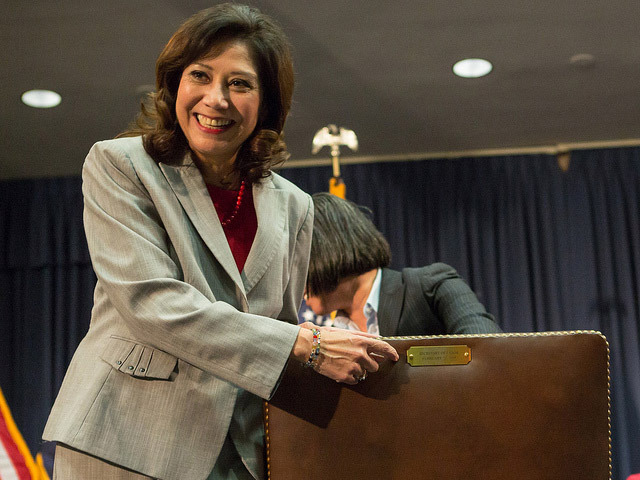
On her last day as secretary, Solis was given a farewell gift of the chair she used in Cabinet meetings.

On January 9, 2013, Solis tendered her resignation as Secretary of Labor, becoming one of several Cabinet members deciding not to stay on for Obama's second term. Her last day in office was January 22, 2013.

Solis, who had never become part of the inner circle of presidential advisors, said it had been a difficult decision and Obama praised her work as secretary. Reflecting upon her tenure, Solis generally garnered praise from labor unions and leading Democrats for her stricter enforcement of job safety regulations and more aggressive pursuit of wage and hour violators. Other leaders and analysts in the labor field thought her performance as secretary was underwhelming, with minimal public visibility and no memorable legacy left behind. All agreed that she operated in a difficult political environment, with the effects of the Great Recession still being felt, Republicans staunchly opposed to labor-based initiatives, and the Obama administration's attentions focused elsewhere. Business groups, meanwhile, continued to characterize her as having been uncooperative in her dealings with them.

During early 2014, reports emerged that the United States Office of Special Counsel, the United States Department of Justice, and the FBI had begun investigating Solis during 2012 for possible violations of fundraising rules by federal officials during her time as Labor Secretary. Allegations were made that Solis solicited subordinates for funds for the 2012 re-election campaign of President Obama. A spokesperson for Solis said that she believed she had done nothing wrong. The matter was also being looked into by the House Oversight and Government Reform Committee and its chair, Representative Darrell Issa, who said there was evidence supporting the allegations. By early 2016, no further word had emerged on any of these investigations.

== Los Angeles County Board of Supervisors ==
Solis's departure from the Labor Department was speculated as a preparation for a run for a seat on the Los Angeles County Board of Supervisors in 2014, to replace the term-limited incumbent, 1st District supervisor Gloria Molina. Officially, Solis only said that she wanted to rest, reconnect with her local community after twelve years in Washington, and spend time with her mother, who was 87 years old at the time.

Later during January 2013, Solis confirmed her interest in the County Board of Supervisors race, saying "I'm going to take a look at it." In explaining why a former U.S. Representative and Cabinet member would be interested in a county-level body, analysts stated that the board is the most powerful county-level legislative body in the United States, and exercises some executive and quasi-judicial powers as well. It controls a workforce larger than the Labor Department's and its $26 billion budget is equivalent to that of an average U.S. state. Each member presiding over some two million constituents, three times that of Solis' old congressional district, and that it is quite possibly the fourth most powerful position in California politics, after governor, U.S. Senator, and mayor of Los Angeles. The supervisors have long been nicknamed "the five little kings".

In November 2013, Solis became a scholar-in-residence at her alma mater of Cal Poly Pomona. Her duties were to include guest lecturing in classes, mentoring students, and assisting in curriculum development, with a focus in political science.

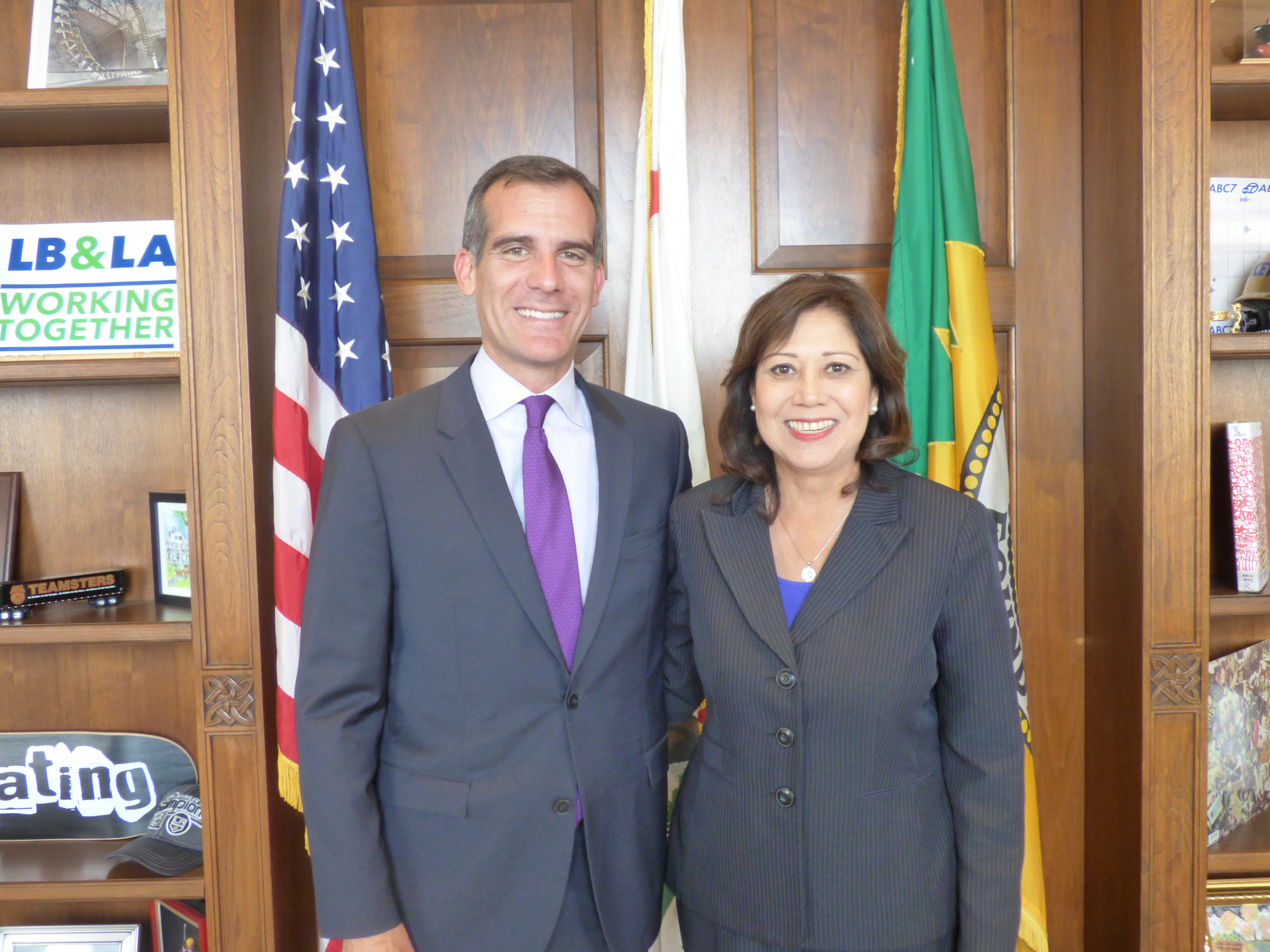
Newly elected Supervisor Solis with Mayor of Los Angeles Eric Garcetti in 2014

On April 5, 2014, Solis formally announced the start of her campaign for the Los Angeles County Board of Supervisors seat, with the election to be held on June 3. By this time she had raised over $600,000 for her effort and was considered the favorite to win the contest. News of the federal investigation had little effect on her campaign. Solis won the seat on June 4, 2014, garnering 70 percent of the vote against two other opponents. The margin meant she won the seat outright and would not need to run in a runoff election.

As Supervisor for District 1, she was at the forefront of the response to the Exide lead contamination issue, which affected Vernon and several other communities within her purview and which touched upon her past concerns with environmental justice. The Supervisors allocated some county money for cleanup, with Solis saying, "the state continues to drag its feet". Going to the state capitol and asking for additional funds to remedy the situation, she said, "This has gone on too long." In February 2016 she praised Governor Jerry Brown for finally increasing state funds for the cleanup, saying "Our voices were heard. For too long we have seen two Americas: one in which affluent neighborhoods get immediate help and relief. The other America is made up of poor working-class families who silently suffer. Today's announcement from the governor reconciles these two Americas."

Among the other areas Solis was responsible for was Downtown Los Angeles. There she said her main priority was dealing with gentrification and the lack of affordable housing. By 2017, data showed that, under her tenure, the homeless rate had gone up by 48 percent in her district, with a 36 percent increase in the San Gabriel Valley itself. The increase was attributed by officials familiar with the problem to constantly increasing housing costs combined with flat incomes. Solis said in response, "With increasingly out-of-control rents, we need more tools to secure housing stability for the most vulnerable County residents."

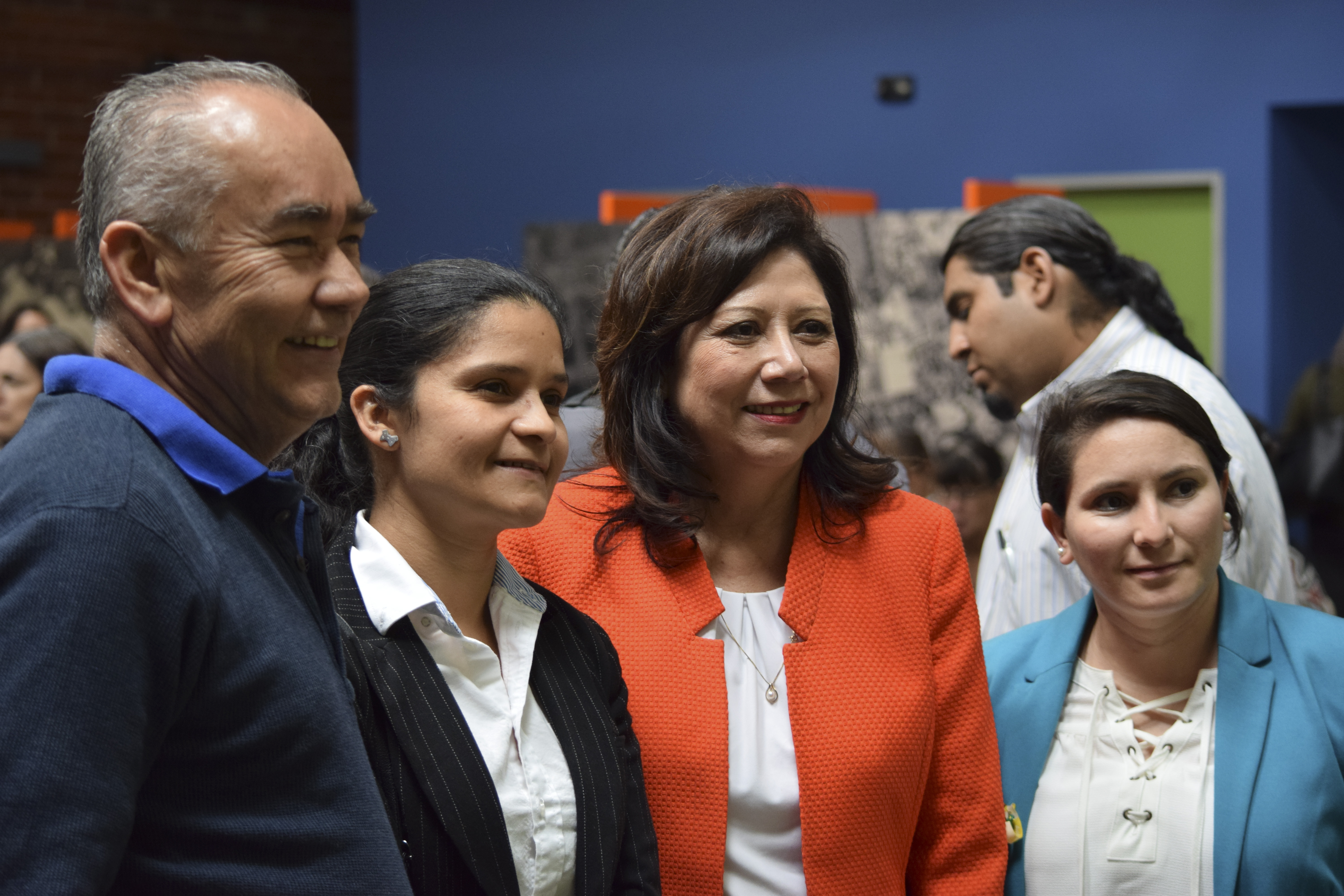
Supervisor Solis at a local union office opening in 2017

Regarding the new job as a whole, Solis said, "It's fascinating how many people work for the county – over 100,000. At the Department of Labor it was like 15,000. The budget here is $26 billion, much more than what I was used to in D.C." In December 2015 Solis took over as Chair of the Supervisors, a position which is rotated on a yearly basis. She said a priority for 2016 would be "to reaffirm our commitment to our diverse county family – to make this family, our family, inclusive for everybody, no matter their background, no matter where they come from, no matter how far down the scale they have been." One of her efforts went towards getting additional resources for older children who were transitioning out of the foster care system.

Following the results of the 2016 United States presidential election and the fear of mass deportations that ensued due to the victor, Solis worked together with Los Angeles Mayor Eric Garcetti to create the $10 million L.A. Justice Fund, which would provide legal services to illegal immigrants facing deportation.

In May 2017, Solis voted in favor of retaining designation of the San Gabriel Mountains National Monument, created in 2014 but under review, along with other recently created national monuments, by new U.S. Secretary of the Interior Ryan Zinke for possible revocation. Solis also favored a parcel tax to increase the number of parks and playgrounds in Los Angeles. In October 2017 a motion that she authored passed the board and resulted in Columbus Day being replaced as an official holiday in Los Angeles County by Indigenous Peoples Day. She said in a statement, "This action is about publicly recognizing that America's ancestors, for centuries, oppressed certain minority groups. This is not about erasing history; I believe the full history and impact of Christopher Columbus should be taught to current and future generations. While we cannot change the past, we can realize the pain that millions suffered throughout our nation's history, as well as the tremendous achievements of the original inhabitants of our continent."

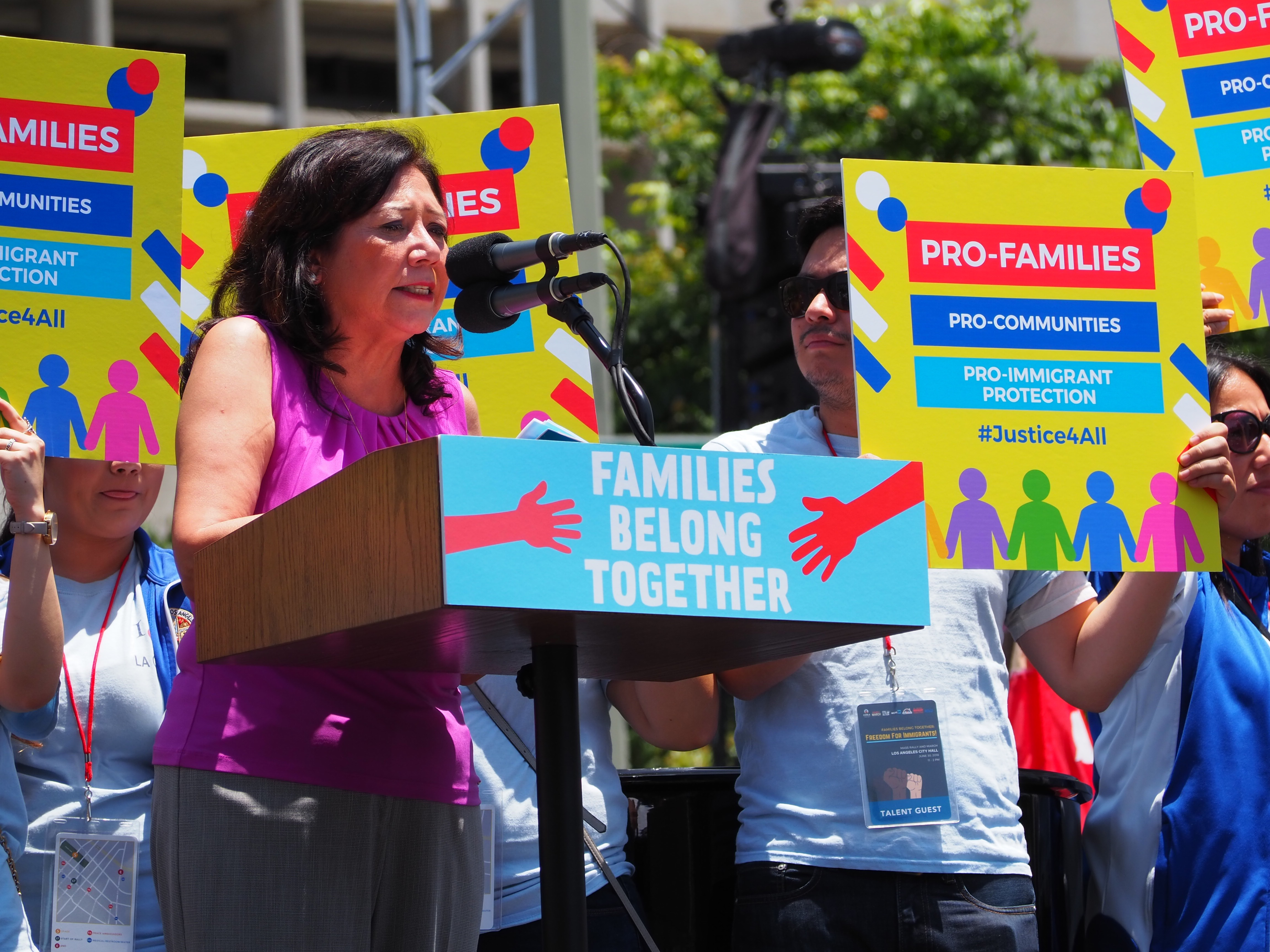
Supervisor Solis speaking at a 2018 Families Belong Together rally in protest of the White House's family separation in U.S. border enforcement

In January 2018, Solis and the other supervisors supported the appointment of Nicole Tinkham as interim public defender, despite a letter signed by 390 public defenders who were concerned that Tinkham lacked criminal law experience and the potential for a conflict of interest, given Tinkham's prior representation of the Los Angeles County Sheriff's Department.

In the 2018 Los Angeles County Board of Supervisors election, Solis ran unopposed, and was accordingly re-elected on June 5, 2018. A lack of serious opposition, or any opposition at all, is not unusual for incumbent Supervisors.

In 2019, Solis, with fellow supervisor Sheila Kuehl, was a leader of the successful effort to stop a planned $1.7 billion mental health treatment center in the downtown area, intended to replace Men's Central Jail. Solis and others argued that the new facility would become a de facto jail and instead urged the creation of smaller treatment facilities spread around the county. Solis said in reference to contractors for any such project, "I don't want to see people who are just used to building brick and mortar. I want to see people who have a humanistic approach." During the year, Solis also became an active supporter for Joe Biden's 2020 presidential campaign, saying that the former vice president, whom she dealt with during her time as Secretary of Labor, had the necessary "steady hand and experience" and who also is "personable" and can interact well with a wide range of people.

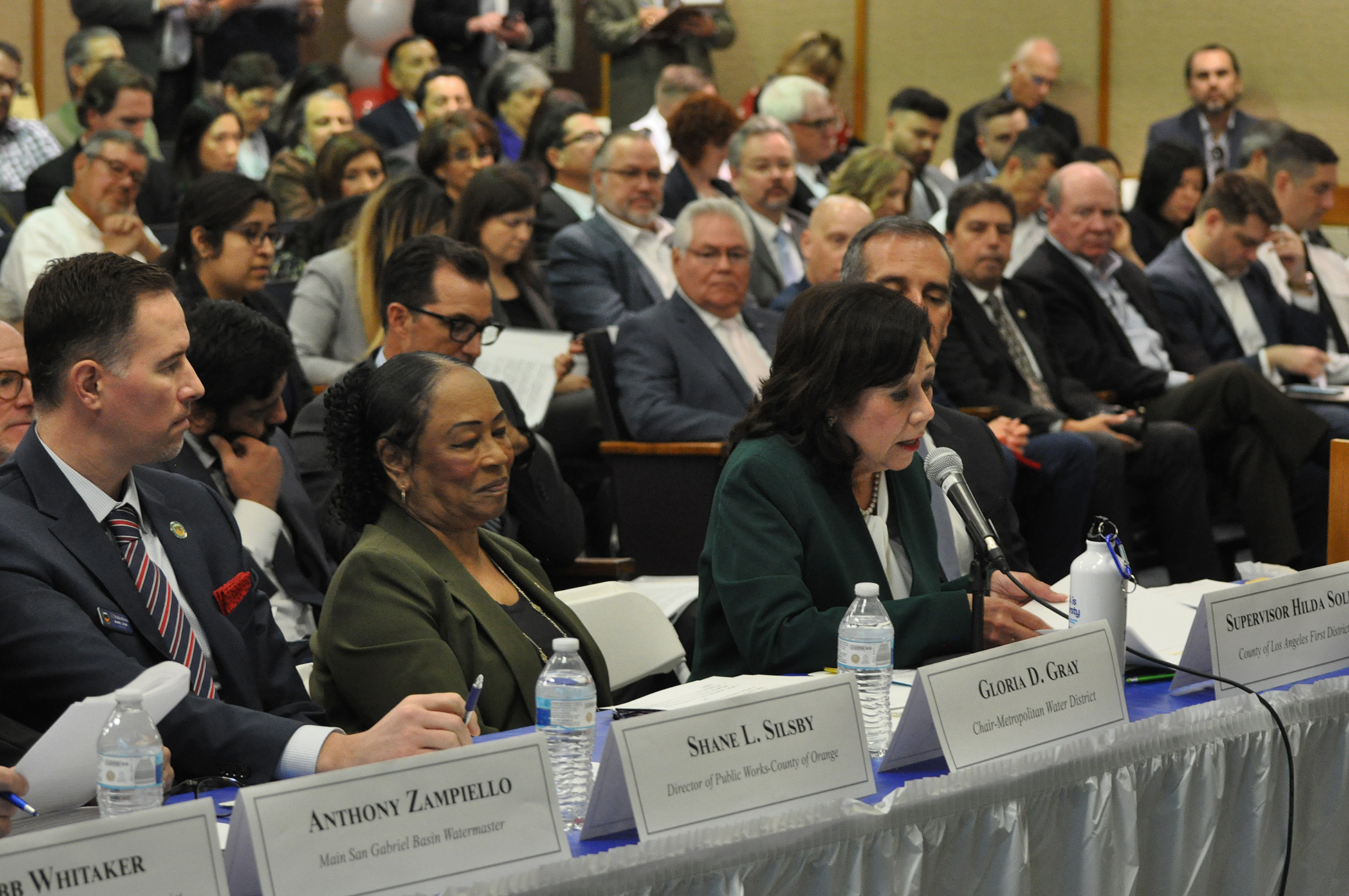
Supervisor Solis testifying at an environmental hearing in early March 2020

The year 2020 was marked by the COVID-19 pandemic in the United States, and Solis and the other supervisors consistently urged residents to stay at home and use other social distancing measures. However some county employees in the districts of Solis and another supervisor complained that they were being compelled to report to unsafe offices instead of being allowed to work remotely. Solis said that the services provided by some positions could only be done in person, but following newspaper inquiries on the matter, remote work was opened up to more county workers. In December 2020, Solis became rotating chair of the board again, and by then the entire board was women, a first for the county and something that Solis said was a historic accomplishment. As the pandemic in Los Angeles reached an especially high peak towards the end of the year, Solis pleaded with county residents to stay home: "As we near Christmas, I urge everyone to cancel their holiday plans to gather with members outside of one's households. This will save many lives."

The pandemic subsequently ebbed for a while, but then by mid-2021 the highly infectious Delta variant had become a significant threat, and in July 2021 Solis issued an executive order reimposing an indoors mask mandate within the county. By this point COVID-19 vaccination in the United States was well underway but also increasingly the subject of political disputes. Saying that "As vaccinations continue at a pace slower than what is necessary to slow the spread, the need for immediate action is great," Solis issued a mandate in August 2021 that county employees, who numbered over a hundred thousand, be vaccinated by October 1. Her action gave no option for regular testing and thus went further than most such mandates elsewhere in California and the rest of the country.

In 2024 and 2025, Solis and Supervisor Lindsey Horvath co-authored motions to adopt default plant-based food procurement and expand plant-based food options at county events and institutions. The motions sought to reduce the county's food-related greenhouse gas emissions.

== Awards and honors ==
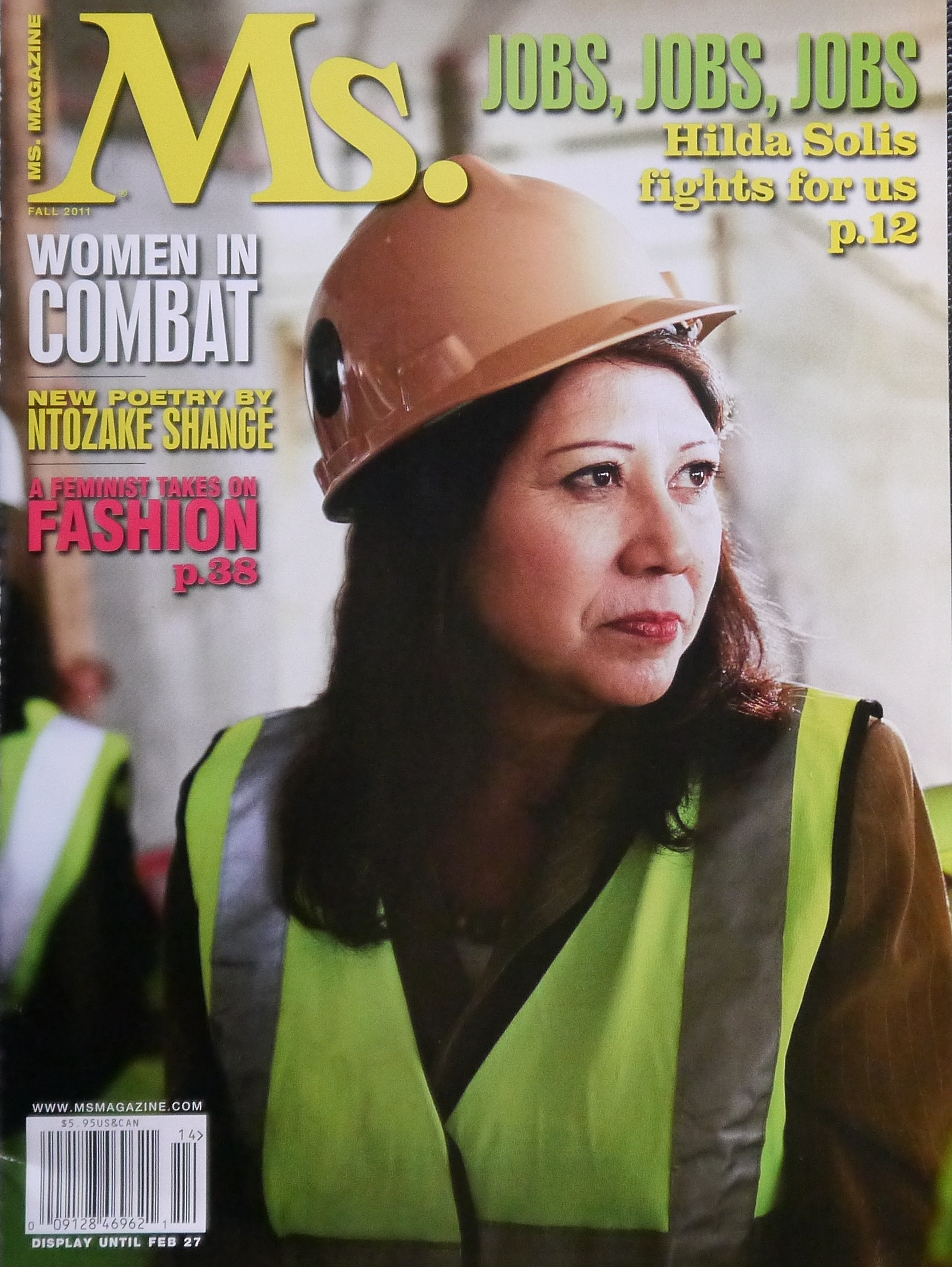
Ms. magazine cover (2011)

As mentioned, in 2000, Solis was given the Profile in Courage Award by the John F. Kennedy Library Foundation.

In 2010, Solis received the inaugural Robert P. Biller Award for Exemplary Public Service from the University of Southern California's School of Policy, Planning, and Development. The Hispanic Association of Colleges & Universities named Solis as the recipient of its 2011 President's Award for Excellence. In 2012, Solis received the Champion for the Futures of Farmworker Children Award from the Association of Farmworker Opportunity Programs. That same year, Solis was given a President's Award from an organization associated with California State University, Los Angeles. The Imagen Foundation honored Solis with its President's Award in 2016, with the presentation being done by the actress America Ferrera. In 2019, Solis received the Leadership Award at the annual American Latino Influencer Awards.

Solis gave the commencement address at Rio Hondo College in 2014, where she had once been on the board of trustees. In recognition of her long career in public service, she was in 2023 awarded an honorary doctor of laws degree by the University of North Carolina at Chapel Hill.

Several entities have been named after Solis. Beginning in the 1990s, the Hilda L. Solis Scholarship Dinner & Reception has been given annually by her alma mater, California State Polytechnic University, Pomona, with a large number of students having benefitted from receiving scholarships. The Hilda L. Solis Care First Village is a set of housing units intended for the homeless that are put together using modular building techniques and located in Downtown Los Angeles. The Hilda L. Solis Learning Academy School of Technology, Business and Education is located in the general East Los Angeles area and is part of the Los Angeles Unified School District.

In 2022, the White House appointed Solis to the Board of Trustees for the John F. Kennedy Center for the Performing Arts.

== See also ==
- List of female United States Cabinet members
- List of Hispanic and Latino Americans in the United States Congress
- Women in the United States House of Representatives

U.S. House of Representatives
Preceded by Matthew Martínez	Member of the U.S. House of Representatives from California's 31st congressional district 2001–2003	Succeeded by Xavier Becerra
Preceded by Diane Watson	Member of the U.S. House of Representatives from California's 32nd congressional district 2003–2009	Succeeded by Judy Chu
Preceded by Linda Sánchez; Redistricted	Member of the U.S. House of Representatives from California's 32nd congressional district Taking office 2027	Elect
Party political offices
New office	Chair of the Democratic Women's Working Group; 2005–2007	Succeeded by Lois Capps
Political offices
Preceded by Elaine Chao	United States Secretary of Labor; 2009–2013	Succeeded by Tom Perez
Preceded by Michael D. Antonovich as Mayor of Los Angeles County	Chair of Los Angeles County; 2015–2016	Succeeded by Mark Ridley-Thomas
Preceded by Kathryn Barger	Chair of Los Angeles County; 2020–2021	Succeeded by Mark Ridley-Thomas
Preceded by Kathryn Barger	Chair of Los Angeles County; 2025–present	Incumbent
U.S. order of precedence (ceremonial)
Preceded by Eric Holder as Former U.S. Cabinet Member	Order of precedence of the United States as Former U.S. Cabinet Member	Succeeded by Gary Locke as Former U.S. Cabinet Member
