= Martin Gallegos =

American politician

Member of the California State Assembly from the 57th district
- In office December 5, 1994 - November 30, 2000
- Preceded by: Hilda Solis
- Succeeded by: Ed Chavez

Personal details
- Born: November 3, 1956 (age 69) Los Angeles, California
- Party: Democratic
- Spouse: Rita (m. 1991)

Martin Gallegos (born November 3, 1956) D.C. is a former California State Assembly man who served in the 57th district from 1994 until 2000. A Democrat from Baldwin Park, he was the first chiropractor to serve in the Assembly.

Gallegos attended East Los Angeles College, Occidental College, and Los Angeles College of Chiropractic.

In 2001, he ran for the California State Senate in the special election for the 24th district but lost in the primary to Gloria Romero. Gallegos currently serves as Senior Vice President, Health Policy and Communications for the Hospital Association of Southern California.

Political offices
Preceded by Hilda Solis	California State Assemblyman, 57th District; December 5, 1994 - November 30, 2000	Succeeded by Ed Chavez
