= Sade Elhawary =

American politician and community organizer

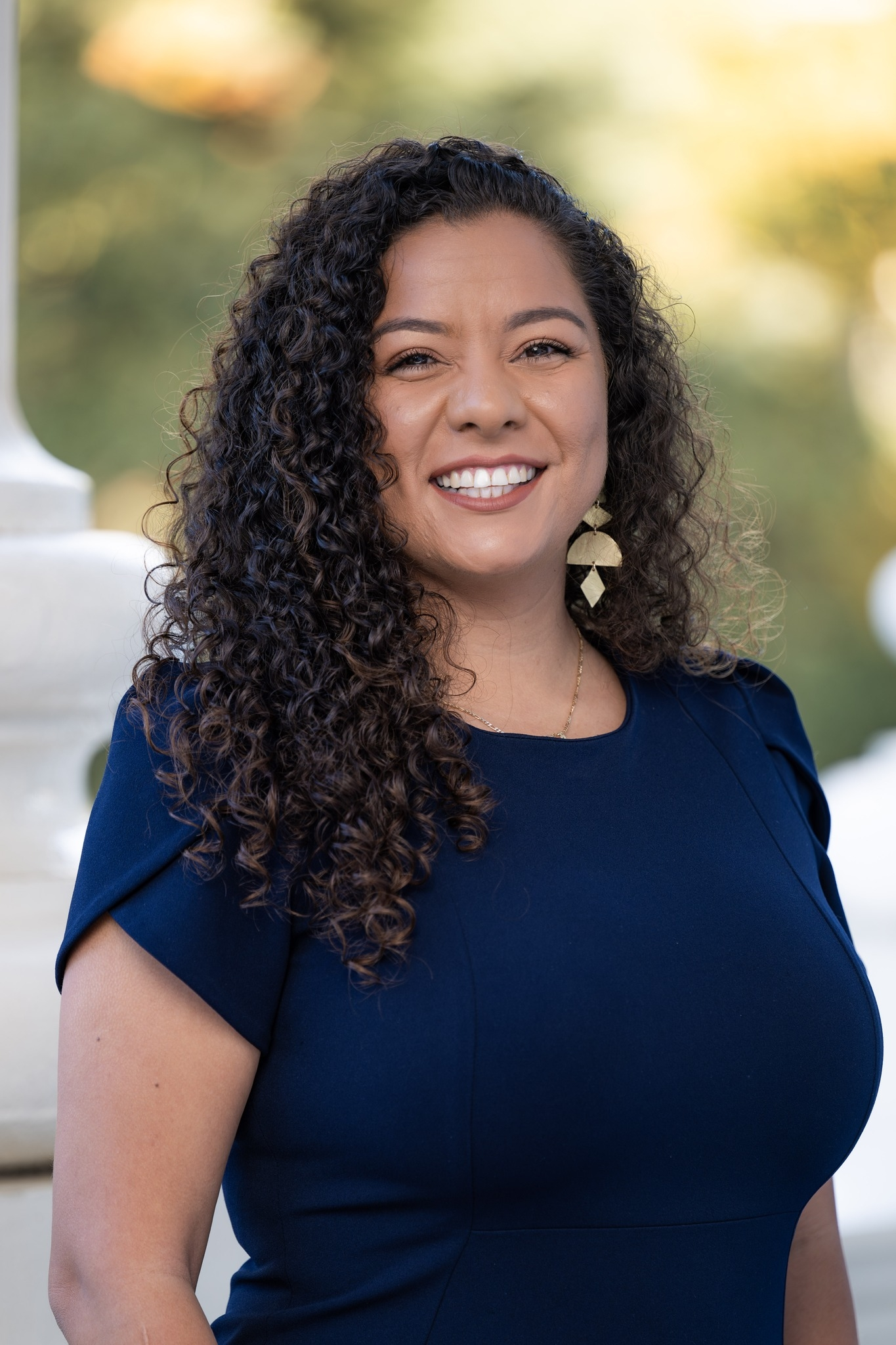
- Official portrait, 2024

Member of the California State Assembly from the 57th district
- Incumbent
- Assumed office December 2, 2024
- Preceded by: Reggie Jones-Sawyer

Personal details
- Born: Zeinab Sade Elhawary; December 19, 1987 (age 38) Los Angeles, California, U.S.
- Education: University of California, Los Angeles (BA); Harvard University (ME)
- Occupation: Politician

Zeinab Sade Elhawary (/ˈʃɑːdeɪ/ SHAH-day or /ʃɑːˈdeɪ/ shah-DAY) is an American politician and community organizer who is a member of the California State Assembly representing the 57th district. A member of the Democratic Party, Elhawary previously worked as an educator and for Mayor Karen Bass.

== Early life and education ==
Elhawary was born in Los Angeles to immigrant parents. She is half-Guatemalan and half-Egyptian. She received her bachelor's degree from the University of California, Los Angeles and her master's degree from the Harvard Graduate School of Education.

== Personal life ==
Elhawary is a foster mother and resides in South Central Los Angeles. She is bisexual. She is a member of Lambda Theta Alpha Latin Sorority, Incorporated.

== Electoral history ==
2024 California State Assembly 57th district election
Primary election
Party	Candidate	Votes	%
Democratic	Efren Martinez	8,891	32.7
Democratic	Sade Elhawary	8,443	31.1
Democratic	Dulce Vasquez	3,648	13.4
Democratic	Greg Akili	3,088	11.4
Democratic	Tara Perry	3,083	11.4
Total votes		27,153	100.0
General election
Democratic	Sade Elhawary	54,117	61.1
Democratic	Efren Martinez	34,506	38.9
Total votes		88,623	100.0
Democratic hold			
