= 2000 California State Assembly election =

- November 7, 2000

All 80 seats in the California State Assembly 41 seats needed for a majority
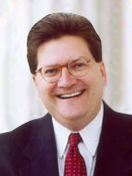

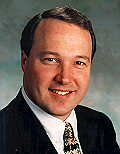
| | Majority party | Minority party |
|---|---|---|
| Leader | Robert Hertzberg | Scott Baugh (retired) |
| Party | Democratic | Republican |
| Leader's seat | 40th–Los Angeles | 67th–Huntington Beach |
| Last election | 48 seats, 52.65% | 32 seats, 44.81% |
| Seats before | 47 | 32 |
| Seats won | 50 | 30 |
| Seat change | ▲3 | ▼2 |
| Popular vote | 6,377,192 | 4,324,585 |
| Percentage | 57.05% | 38.69% |
| Swing | ▲4.2pp | ▼6.12pp |
- Democratic gain Democratic hold Republican hold 50–60% 60–70% 70–80% 80–90% >90% 40–50% 50–60% 60–70% 70–80%
Speaker before election
Robert Hertzberg
Democratic
Elected Speaker
Robert Hertzberg
Democratic

The 2000 California State Assembly elections were held on November 7, 2000. California's State Assembly in its entirety comes up for election in even numbered years. Each seat has a two-year term and members are limited to three 2-year terms (six years). All 80 biennially elected seats in the Assembly were up for election this year. Democrats retained control of the Assembly, expanding their majority by two and defeating independent Audie Bock, who previously won a special election to her seat as a Green.

== Overview ==
California State Assembly elections, 2000
| Party | Votes | Percentage | Incumbents | Open | Before | After | +/– |
|---|---|---|---|---|---|---|---|
| Democratic | 6,377,192 | 57.05% | 32 | 15 | 47 | 50 | +3 |
| Republican | 4,324,585 | 38.69% | 16 | 16 | 32 | 30 | -2 |
| Libertarian | 316,668 | 2.83% | 0 | 0 | 0 | 0 | 0 |
| Natural Law | 72,119 | 0.65% | 0 | 0 | 0 | 0 | 0 |
| Green | 43,379 | 0.39% | 0 | 0 | 0 | 0 | 0 |
| Independent | 36,308 | 0.32% | 1 | 0 | 1 | 0 | -1 |
| Reform | 8,029 | 0.07% | 0 | 0 | 0 | 0 | 0 |
| Invalid or blank votes | 760,657 | 6.37% | — | — | — | — | — |
| Totals | 11,938,937 | 100.00% | 49 | 31 | 80 | 80 | — |

↓
| 50 | 30 |
| Democratic | Republican |

== Results ==
Final results from the California Secretary of State:

=== District 1 ===
California's 1st State Assembly district election, 2000
| Party | Candidate | Votes | % |
|---|---|---|---|
| Democratic | Virginia Strom-Martin (incumbent) | 108,184 | 64.50 |
| Republican | Michael Lampson | 51,753 | 30.85 |
| Libertarian | Joshua Gilleo | 7,800 | 4.65 |
| Invalid or blank votes | | 9,513 | 5.37 |
| Total votes | | 177,250 | 100.00 |
| Democratic hold | | | |

=== District 2 ===
California's 2nd State Assembly district election, 2000
| Party | Candidate | Votes | % |
|---|---|---|---|
| Republican | Richard Dickerson (incumbent) | 104,614 | 68.52 |
| Democratic | Virgil D. Parks | 38,281 | 25.07 |
| Libertarian | Pete Bret | 4,924 | 3.23 |
| Natural Law | Patrice Thiessen | 4,863 | 3.19 |
| Invalid or blank votes | | 7,397 | 4.62 |
| Total votes | | 160,079 | 100.00 |
| Republican hold | | | |

=== District 3 ===
California's 3rd State Assembly district election, 2000
| Party | Candidate | Votes | % |
|---|---|---|---|
| Republican | Sam Aanestad (incumbent) | 99,336 | 61.35 |
| Democratic | Benjamin Wirtschafter | 52,978 | 32.72 |
| Libertarian | William L. Thomason | 9,601 | 5.93 |
| Invalid or blank votes | | 5,861 | 3.49 |
| Total votes | | 167,776 | 100.00 |
| Republican hold | | | |

=== District 4 ===
California's 4th State Assembly district election, 2000
| Party | Candidate | Votes | % |
|---|---|---|---|
| Republican | Tim Leslie | 144,844 | 66.95 |
| Democratic | Stephen A. Macola | 71,492 | 33.05 |
| Invalid or blank votes | | 5,818 | 2.62 |
| Total votes | | 222,154 | 100.00 |
| Republican hold | | | |

=== District 5 ===
California's 5th State Assembly district election, 2000
| Party | Candidate | Votes | % |
|---|---|---|---|
| Republican | Dave Cox (incumbent) | 111,377 | 75.91 |
| Libertarian | Eugene Frazier | 35,353 | 24.09 |
| Invalid or blank votes | | 0 | 0.00 |
| Total votes | | 146,730 | 100.00 |
| Republican hold | | | |

=== District 6 ===
California's 6th State Assembly district election, 2000
| Party | Candidate | Votes | % |
|---|---|---|---|
| Democratic | Joe Nation | 113,439 | 63.93 |
| Republican | Edward John Sullivan | 48,163 | 27.14 |
| Independent | Anna Nevenic | 10,954 | 6.17 |
| Libertarian | Richard Olmstead | 4,893 | 2.76 |
| Invalid or blank votes | | 16,016 | 8.28 |
| Total votes | | 193,465 | 100.00 |
| Democratic hold | | | |

=== District 7 ===
California's 7th State Assembly district election, 2000
| Party | Candidate | Votes | % |
|---|---|---|---|
| Democratic | Pat Wiggins (incumbent) | 102,425 | 66.45 |
| Republican | Pedro J. Rivera | 45,563 | 29.56 |
| Libertarian | William Schoeffler | 6,147 | 3.99 |
| Invalid or blank votes | | 11,892 | 7.16 |
| Total votes | | 166,027 | 100.00 |
| Democratic hold | | | |

=== District 8 ===
California's 8th State Assembly district election, 2000
| Party | Candidate | Votes | % |
|---|---|---|---|
| Democratic | Helen Thomson (incumbent) | 92,315 | 62.18 |
| Republican | John R. Munn | 51,671 | 34.80 |
| Natural Law | Robert W. Wilson | 4,483 | 3.02 |
| Invalid or blank votes | | 5,991 | 3.88 |
| Total votes | | 154,460 | 100.00 |
| Democratic hold | | | |

=== District 9 ===
California's 9th State Assembly district election, 2000
| Party | Candidate | Votes | % |
|---|---|---|---|
| Democratic | Darrell Steinberg (incumbent) | 75,953 | 70.17 |
| Republican | Charles Hargrave | 24,572 | 22.70 |
| Green | Jan Louis Bergeron | 5,698 | 5.26 |
| Natural Law | Bruce B. Saunders | 2,012 | 1.86 |
| Invalid or blank votes | | 0 | 0.00 |
| Total votes | | 108,235 | 100.00 |
| Democratic hold | | | |

=== District 10 ===
California's 10th State Assembly district election, 2000
| Party | Candidate | Votes | % |
|---|---|---|---|
| Republican | Anthony Pescetti (incumbent) | 92,196 | 53.51 |
| Democratic | Debra Gravert | 73,505 | 42.66 |
| Libertarian | Tom Kohlhepp | 6,605 | 3.83 |
| Invalid or blank votes | | 1,315 | 0.76 |
| Total votes | | 173,621 | 100.00 |
| Republican hold | | | |

=== District 11 ===
California's 11th State Assembly district election, 2000
| Party | Candidate | Votes | % |
|---|---|---|---|
| Democratic | Joe Canciamilla | 98,728 | 66.93 |
| Republican | James Diaz | 42,523 | 28.83 |
| Libertarian | Frank Manske | 6,257 | 4.24 |
| Invalid or blank votes | | 12,610 | 7.88 |
| Total votes | | 160,118 | 100.00 |
| Democratic hold | | | |

=== District 12 ===
California's 12th State Assembly district election, 2000
| Party | Candidate | Votes | % |
|---|---|---|---|
| Democratic | Kevin Shelley (incumbent) | 110,644 | 82.23 |
| Republican | Howard Epstein | 23,905 | 17.77 |
| Invalid or blank votes | | 0 | 0.00 |
| Total votes | | 134,549 | 100.00 |
| Democratic hold | | | |

=== District 13 ===
California's 13th State Assembly district election, 2000
| Party | Candidate | Votes | % |
|---|---|---|---|
| Democratic | Carole Migden (incumbent) | 115,378 | 78.55 |
| Republican | Robert C. Lane | 22,037 | 15.00 |
| Libertarian | Starchild | 9,469 | 6.45 |
| Invalid or blank votes | | 0 | 0.00 |
| Total votes | | 146,884 | 100.00 |
| Democratic hold | | | |

=== District 14 ===
California's 14th State Assembly district election, 2000
| Party | Candidate | Votes | % |
|---|---|---|---|
| Democratic | Dion Aroner (incumbent) | 123,968 | 83.92 |
| Republican | Jerald Udinsky | 16,366 | 11.08 |
| Libertarian | Daniel C. Burton | 7,383 | 5.00 |
| Invalid or blank votes | | 16,650 | 10.13 |
| Total votes | | 164,367 | 100.00 |
| Democratic hold | | | |

=== District 15 ===
California's 15th State Assembly district election, 2000
| Party | Candidate | Votes | % |
|---|---|---|---|
| Republican | Lynne C. Leach (incumbent) | 123,522 | 61.32 |
| Democratic | Gregory James Rolen | 77,901 | 38.68 |
| Invalid or blank votes | | 17,749 | 8.10 |
| Total votes | | 219,172 | 100.00 |
| Republican hold | | | |

=== District 16 ===
California's 16th State Assembly district election, 2000
| Party | Candidate | Votes | % |
|---|---|---|---|
| Democratic | Wilma Chan | 78,347 | 67.29 |
| Independent | Audie Bock (incumbent) | 25,714 | 22.09 |
| Republican | Timothy B. McCormick | 10,004 | 8.59 |
| Libertarian | Richard E. Armstrong | 2,365 | 2.03 |
| Invalid or blank votes | | 10,301 | 8.76 |
| Total votes | | 117,539 | 100.00 |
| Democratic gain from Independent | | | |

=== District 17 ===
California's 17th State Assembly district election, 2000
| Party | Candidate | Votes | % |
|---|---|---|---|
| Democratic | Barbara S. Matthews | 64,361 | 53.04 |
| Republican | Greg Aghazarian | 54,031 | 44.53 |
| Libertarian | Roy W. Busch | 2,943 | 2.43 |
| Invalid or blank votes | | 4,904 | 3.88 |
| Total votes | | 126,239 | 100.00 |
| Democratic hold | | | |

=== District 18 ===
California's 18th State Assembly district election, 2000
| Party | Candidate | Votes | % |
|---|---|---|---|
| Democratic | Ellen Corbett (incumbent) | 91,991 | 75.45 |
| Republican | Syed Rifat Mahmood | 29,936 | 24.55 |
| Invalid or blank votes | | 13,215 | 9.78 |
| Total votes | | 135,142 | 100.00 |
| Democratic hold | | | |

=== District 19 ===
California's 19th State Assembly district election, 2000
| Party | Candidate | Votes | % |
|---|---|---|---|
| Democratic | Lou Papan (incumbent) | 90,675 | 70.34 |
| Republican | Steven H. Kassel | 30,162 | 23.40 |
| Libertarian | Steve Lundry | 4,669 | 3.62 |
| Reform | Paul J. Six | 3,402 | 2.64 |
| Invalid or blank votes | | 0 | 0.00 |
| Total votes | | 128,908 | 100.00 |
| Democratic hold | | | |

=== District 20 ===
California's 20th State Assembly district election, 2000
| Party | Candidate | Votes | % |
|---|---|---|---|
| Democratic | John A. Dutra (incumbent) | 75,455 | 64.46 |
| Republican | Lowell King | 35,889 | 30.66 |
| Libertarian | Mark Werlwas | 5,709 | 4.88 |
| Invalid or blank votes | | 13,301 | 10.20 |
| Total votes | | 130,354 | 100.00 |
| Democratic hold | | | |

=== District 21 ===
California's 21st State Assembly district election, 2000
| Party | Candidate | Votes | % |
|---|---|---|---|
| Democratic | Joe Simitian | 82,466 | 54.89 |
| Republican | Deborah E. G. Wilder | 53,140 | 35.37 |
| Green | Gloria Purcell | 14,641 | 9.74 |
| Invalid or blank votes | | 6,295 | 4.02 |
| Total votes | | 156,542 | 100.00 |
| Democratic hold | | | |

=== District 22 ===
California's 22nd State Assembly district election, 2000
| Party | Candidate | Votes | % |
|---|---|---|---|
| Democratic | Elaine Alquist (incumbent) | 81,401 | 67.58 |
| Republican | Stan Kawczynski | 39,149 | 32.50 |
| Invalid or blank votes | | 14,942 | 11.03 |
| Total votes | | 135,492 | 100.00 |
| Democratic hold | | | |

=== District 23 ===
California's 23rd State Assembly district election, 2000
| Party | Candidate | Votes | % |
|---|---|---|---|
| Democratic | Manolo Diaz | 58,020 | 71.60 |
| Republican | Tom Askeland | 17,531 | 21.64 |
| Libertarian | Dana W. Albrecht | 5,478 | 6.76 |
| Invalid or blank votes | | 9,017 | 10.01 |
| Total votes | | 90,046 | 100.00 |
| Democratic hold | | | |

=== District 24 ===
California's 24th State Assembly district election, 2000
| Party | Candidate | Votes | % |
|---|---|---|---|
| Democratic | Rebecca Cohn | 78,173 | 50.43 |
| Republican | Suzanne E. Jackson | 69,825 | 45.05 |
| Libertarian | H. Raymond Strong | 7,000 | 4.52 |
| Independent | George Swenson (write-in) | 96 | 0.06 |
| Invalid or blank votes | | 14,980 | 8.81 |
| Total votes | | 170,074 | 100.00 |
| Democratic gain from Republican | | | |

=== District 25 ===
California's 25th State Assembly district election, 2000
| Party | Candidate | Votes | % |
|---|---|---|---|
| Republican | Dave Cogdill (incumbent) | 91,478 | 60.69 |
| Democratic | Stephen F. Rico | 55,406 | 36.76 |
| Libertarian | Jonathan Zwickel | 3,838 | 2.55 |
| Invalid or blank votes | | 10,355 | 6.43 |
| Total votes | | 161,077 | 100.00 |
| Republican hold | | | |

=== District 26 ===
California's 26th State Assembly district election, 2000
| Party | Candidate | Votes | % |
|---|---|---|---|
| Democratic | Dennis Cardoza (incumbent) | 67,326 | 65.61 |
| Republican | Marshall Sanchez | 35,294 | 34.39 |
| Invalid or blank votes | | 8,231 | 7.43 |
| Total votes | | 110,851 | 100.00 |
| Democratic hold | | | |

=== District 27 ===
California's 27th State Assembly district election, 2000
| Party | Candidate | Votes | % |
|---|---|---|---|
| Democratic | Fred Keeley (incumbent) | 101,459 | 64.79 |
| Republican | Charles Clayton Carter | 44,804 | 28.61 |
| Libertarian | David R. Bonino | 5,201 | 3.32 |
| Natural Law | Madeline De Joly | 5,140 | 3.28 |
| Invalid or blank votes | | 9,594 | 5.77 |
| Total votes | | 166,198 | 100.00 |
| Democratic hold | | | |

=== District 28 ===
California's 28th State Assembly district election, 2000
| Party | Candidate | Votes | % |
|---|---|---|---|
| Democratic | Simon Salinas | 66,011 | 52.85 |
| Republican | Jeff Denham | 54,729 | 43.81 |
| Libertarian | Roger Ver | 2,134 | 1.71 |
| Reform | J. J. Vogel | 2,038 | 1.63 |
| Invalid or blank votes | | 6,924 | 5.25 |
| Total votes | | 131,836 | 100.00 |
| Democratic gain from Republican | | | |

=== District 29 ===
California's 29th State Assembly district election, 2000
| Party | Candidate | Votes | % |
|---|---|---|---|
| Republican | Mike Briggs (incumbent) | 102,156 | 70.34 |
| Democratic | Lita Reid | 38,595 | 26.57 |
| Libertarian | Ron Drioane | 4,486 | 3.09 |
| Invalid or blank votes | | 9,671 | 6.24 |
| Total votes | | 154,908 | 100.00 |
| Republican hold | | | |

=== District 30 ===
California's 30th State Assembly district election, 2000
| Party | Candidate | Votes | % |
|---|---|---|---|
| Democratic | Dean Florez (incumbent) | 56,936 | 65.74 |
| Republican | Kenneth D. Kay | 29,669 | 34.26 |
| Invalid or blank votes | | 1,986 | 2.24 |
| Total votes | | 88,591 | 100.00 |
| Democratic hold | | | |

=== District 31 ===
California's 31st State Assembly district election, 2000
| Party | Candidate | Votes | % |
|---|---|---|---|
| Democratic | Sarah L. Reyes (incumbent) | 47,202 | 63.16 |
| Republican | Richard Guerra Cabral | 27,529 | 36.84 |
| Invalid or blank votes | | 2,640 | 3.41 |
| Total votes | | 77,371 | 100.00 |
| Democratic hold | | | |

=== District 32 ===
California's 32nd State Assembly district election, 2000
| Party | Candidate | Votes | % |
|---|---|---|---|
| Republican | Roy Ashburn (incumbent) | 96,178 | 70.30 |
| Democratic | Virginia R. Gurrola | 36,527 | 26.70 |
| Libertarian | Vernon Ric Pinkerton | 4,107 | 3.00 |
| Invalid or blank votes | | 1,236 | 0.90 |
| Total votes | | 138,048 | 100.00 |
| Republican hold | | | |

=== District 33 ===
California's 33rd State Assembly district election, 2000
| Party | Candidate | Votes | % |
|---|---|---|---|
| Republican | Abel Maldonado (incumbent) | 101,200 | 64.44 |
| Democratic | Laurence D. Houlgate | 55,855 | 35.56 |
| Invalid or blank votes | | 6,562 | 4.01 |
| Total votes | | 163,617 | 100.00 |
| Republican hold | | | |

=== District 34 ===
California's 34th State Assembly district election, 2000
| Party | Candidate | Votes | % |
|---|---|---|---|
| Republican | Phil Wyman | 79,261 | 65.80 |
| Democratic | Robert "Bob" Conaway | 41,203 | 34.20 |
| Invalid or blank votes | | 421 | 0.30 |
| Total votes | | 120,885 | 100.00 |
| Republican hold | | | |

=== District 35 ===
California's 35th State Assembly district election, 2000
| Party | Candidate | Votes | % |
|---|---|---|---|
| Democratic | Hannah-Beth Jackson (incumbent) | 100,432 | 61.65 |
| Republican | Robin Sue Sullivan | 58,212 | 35.73 |
| Natural Law | Eric Dahl | 4,264 | 2.62 |
| Invalid or blank votes | | 8,477 | 4.95 |
| Total votes | | 171,385 | 100.00 |
| Democratic hold | | | |

=== District 36 ===
California's 36th State Assembly district election, 2000
| Party | Candidate | Votes | % |
|---|---|---|---|
| Republican | George C. Runner (incumbent) | 90,712 | 63.07 |
| Democratic | Paula L. Calderon | 47,528 | 33.05 |
| Libertarian | Gregory James Bashem | 5,581 | 3.88 |
| Invalid or blank votes | | 11,493 | 7.40 |
| Total votes | | 155,314 | 100.00 |
| Republican hold | | | |

=== District 37 ===
California's 37th State Assembly district election, 2000
| Party | Candidate | Votes | % |
|---|---|---|---|
| Republican | Tony Strickland (incumbent) | 71,572 | 51.28 |
| Democratic | Rosalind Ann McGrath | 64,691 | 46.35 |
| Libertarian | Willard Michlin | 3,306 | 2.37 |
| Invalid or blank votes | | 8,046 | 5.45 |
| Total votes | | 147,615 | 100.00 |
| Republican hold | | | |

=== District 38 ===
California's 38th State Assembly district election, 2000
| Party | Candidate | Votes | % |
|---|---|---|---|
| Republican | Keith Richman | 74,581 | 50.96 |
| Democratic | Jon M. Lauritzen | 64,732 | 44.23 |
| Libertarian | Philip Baron | 7,033 | 4.81 |
| Invalid or blank votes | | 16,557 | 10.16 |
| Total votes | | 162,903 | 100.00 |
| Republican hold | | | |

=== District 39 ===
California's 39th State Assembly district election, 2000
| Party | Candidate | Votes | % |
|---|---|---|---|
| Democratic | Tony Cardenas (incumbent) | 54,466 | 78.08 |
| Republican | Enrique (Henry) Valdez | 12,269 | 17.59 |
| Libertarian | Christopher "Kit" Maira | 3,020 | 4.33 |
| Invalid or blank votes | | 6,897 | 9.00 |
| Total votes | | 76,652 | 100.00 |
| Democratic hold | | | |

=== District 40 ===
California's 40th State Assembly district election, 2000
| Party | Candidate | Votes | % |
|---|---|---|---|
| Democratic | Bob Hertzberg (incumbent) | 70,463 | 70.21 |
| Republican | Kyle Hammans | 22,808 | 22.73 |
| Libertarian | Kelley L. Ross | 7,093 | 7.07 |
| Invalid or blank votes | | 11,743 | 10.47 |
| Total votes | | 112,107 | 100.00 |
| Democratic hold | | | |

=== District 41 ===
California's 41st State Assembly district election, 2000
| Party | Candidate | Votes | % |
|---|---|---|---|
| Democratic | Fran Pavley | 101,129 | 60.48 |
| Republican | Jayne Murphy Shapiro | 58,562 | 35.02 |
| Libertarian | Colin S. Goldman | 7,527 | 4.50 |
| Invalid or blank votes | | 18,156 | 9.79 |
| Total votes | | 185,374 | 100.00 |
| Democratic hold | | | |

=== District 42 ===
California's 42nd State Assembly district election, 2000
| Party | Candidate | Votes | % |
|---|---|---|---|
| Democratic | Paul Koretz | 100,238 | 66.64 |
| Republican | Douglas Cleon Taylor | 28,171 | 18.73 |
| Green | Sara Amir | 14,995 | 9.97 |
| Libertarian | Mark Allen Selzer | 5,665 | 3.77 |
| Natural Law | Ivka Adam | 1,352 | 0.90 |
| Invalid or blank votes | | 20,108 | 11.79 |
| Total votes | | 170,529 | 100.00 |
| Democratic hold | | | |

=== District 43 ===
California's 43rd State Assembly district election, 2000
| Party | Candidate | Votes | % |
|---|---|---|---|
| Democratic | Dario Frommer | 70,841 | 58.73 |
| Republican | Craig Harry Missakian | 49,786 | 41.27 |
| Invalid or blank votes | | 11,027 | 8.38 |
| Total votes | | 131,654 | 100.00 |
| Democratic hold | | | |

=== District 44 ===
California's 44th State Assembly district election, 2000
| Party | Candidate | Votes | % |
|---|---|---|---|
| Democratic | Carol Liu | 92,081 | 62.24 |
| Republican | Susan Carpenter-McMillan | 48,992 | 33.11 |
| Libertarian | Jerry Douglas | 6,883 | 4.65 |
| Invalid or blank votes | | 11,882 | 7.43 |
| Total votes | | 159,838 | 100.00 |
| Democratic hold | | | |

=== District 45 ===
California's 45th State Assembly district election, 2000
| Party | Candidate | Votes | % |
|---|---|---|---|
| Democratic | Jackie Goldberg | 57,092 | 100.00 |
| Invalid or blank votes | | 19,890 | 25.84 |
| Total votes | | 76,982 | 100.00 |
| Democratic hold | | | |

=== District 46 ===
California's 46th State Assembly district election, 2000
| Party | Candidate | Votes | % |
|---|---|---|---|
| Democratic | Gilbert Cedillo (incumbent) | 31,919 | 83.71 |
| Republican | Matt Brown | 6,211 | 16.29 |
| Invalid or blank votes | | 5,737 | 13.08 |
| Total votes | | 43,867 | 100.00 |
| Democratic hold | | | |

=== District 47 ===
California's 47th State Assembly district election, 2000
| Party | Candidate | Votes | % |
|---|---|---|---|
| Democratic | Herb Wesson (incumbent) | 100,328 | 83.27 |
| Republican | Jonathan Leonard | 16,137 | 13.39 |
| Libertarian | Scott Pacer | 4,027 | 3.34 |
| Invalid or blank votes | | 14,467 | 10.72 |
| Total votes | | 134,959 | 100.00 |
| Democratic hold | | | |

=== District 48 ===
California's 48th State Assembly district election, 2000
| Party | Candidate | Votes | % |
|---|---|---|---|
| Democratic | Roderick "Rod" Wright | 56,030 | 94.29 |
| Republican | Ernest Woods | 3,394 | 5.71 |
| Invalid or blank votes | | 6,671 | 10.09 |
| Total votes | | 66,095 | 100.00 |
| Democratic hold | | | |

=== District 49 ===
California's 49th State Assembly district election, 2000
| Party | Candidate | Votes | % |
|---|---|---|---|
| Democratic | Gloria Romero (incumbent) | 62,015 | 100.00 |
| Invalid or blank votes | | 29,225 | 32.03 |
| Total votes | | 91,240 | 100.00 |
| Democratic hold | | | |

=== District 50 ===
California's 50th State Assembly district election, 2000
| Party | Candidate | Votes | % |
|---|---|---|---|
| Democratic | Marco Antonio Firebaugh (inc.) | 43,736 | 85.26 |
| Republican | Gladys O. Miller | 7,562 | 14.74 |
| Invalid or blank votes | | 7,110 | 12.17 |
| Total votes | | 58,408 | 100.00 |
| Democratic hold | | | |

=== District 51 ===
California's 51st State Assembly district election, 2000
| Party | Candidate | Votes | % |
|---|---|---|---|
| Democratic | Jerome Horton (incumbent) | 70,169 | 77.90 |
| Republican | Antoine Hawkins | 19,910 | 22.10 |
| Invalid or blank votes | | 9,912 | 9.91 |
| Total votes | | 99,991 | 100.00 |
| Democratic hold | | | |

=== District 52 ===
California's 52nd State Assembly district election, 2000
| Party | Candidate | Votes | % |
|---|---|---|---|
| Democratic | Carl Washington (incumbent) | 61,382 | 87.15 |
| Republican | Mark Anthony Iles | 9,047 | 12.85 |
| Invalid or blank votes | | 6,792 | 8.80 |
| Total votes | | 77,221 | 100.00 |
| Democratic hold | | | |

=== District 53 ===
California's 53rd State Assembly district election, 2000
| Party | Candidate | Votes | % |
|---|---|---|---|
| Democratic | George Nakano (incumbent) | 104,431 | 64.34 |
| Republican | Gerald N. Felano | 53,017 | 32.67 |
| Libertarian | Phil Howitt | 4,852 | 2.99 |
| Invalid or blank votes | | 13,002 | 7.42 |
| Total votes | | 175,302 | 100.00 |
| Democratic hold | | | |

=== District 54 ===
California's 54th State Assembly district election, 2000
| Party | Candidate | Votes | % |
|---|---|---|---|
| Democratic | Alan Lowenthal (incumbent) | 83,000 | 58.59 |
| Republican | Rudy Svorinich, Jr. | 54,938 | 38.78 |
| Libertarian | Dale F. Ogden | 3,719 | 2.63 |
| Invalid or blank votes | | 9,861 | 6.51 |
| Total votes | | 151,518 | 100.00 |
| Democratic hold | | | |

=== District 55 ===
California's 55th State Assembly district election, 2000
| Party | Candidate | Votes | % |
|---|---|---|---|
| Democratic | Jenny Oropeza | 57,735 | 74.63 |
| Republican | Saul E. Lankster | 15,806 | 20.43 |
| Libertarian | Guy Wilson | 3,822 | 4.94 |
| Invalid or blank votes | | 8,534 | 9.94 |
| Total votes | | 85,897 | 100.00 |
| Democratic hold | | | |

=== District 56 ===
California's 56th State Assembly district election, 2000
| Party | Candidate | Votes | % |
|---|---|---|---|
| Democratic | Sally Havice (incumbent) | 73,536 | 60.59 |
| Republican | Grace Hu | 47,836 | 39.41 |
| Invalid or blank votes | | 8,970 | 6.88 |
| Total votes | | 130,342 | 100.00 |
| Democratic hold | | | |

=== District 57 ===
California's 57th State Assembly district election, 2000
| Party | Candidate | Votes | % |
|---|---|---|---|
| Democratic | Edward Chavez | 56,710 | 73.28 |
| Republican | Katherine Licari Venturoso | 20,675 | 26.72 |
| Invalid or blank votes | | 9,747 | 11.19 |
| Total votes | | 87,132 | 100.00 |
| Democratic hold | | | |

=== District 58 ===
California's 58th State Assembly district election, 2000
| Party | Candidate | Votes | % |
|---|---|---|---|
| Democratic | Thomas M. Calderon (incumbent) | 73,028 | 75.28 |
| Republican | Alex A. Burrola | 23,978 | 24.72 |
| Invalid or blank votes | | 9,968 | 9.32 |
| Total votes | | 106,974 | 100.00 |
| Democratic hold | | | |

=== District 59 ===
California's 59th State Assembly district election, 2000
| Party | Candidate | Votes | % |
|---|---|---|---|
| Republican | Dennis L. Mountjoy | 67,036 | 48.30 |
| Democratic | Meline Dolores Hall | 60,013 | 43.24 |
| Libertarian | George White | 6,359 | 4.58 |
| Natural Law | Louis M. Allison | 5,390 | 3.88 |
| Invalid or blank votes | | 13,498 | 8.86 |
| Total votes | | 152,296 | 100.00 |
| Republican hold | | | |

=== District 60 ===
California's 60th State Assembly district election, 2000
| Party | Candidate | Votes | % |
|---|---|---|---|
| Republican | Robert Pacheco (incumbent) | 71,113 | 59.31 |
| Democratic | Jeff A. Duhamel | 43,992 | 36.69 |
| Libertarian | Scott E. Young | 4,802 | 4.00 |
| Invalid or blank votes | | 11,752 | 8.93 |
| Total votes | | 131,659 | 100.00 |
| Republican hold | | | |

=== District 61 ===
California's 61st State Assembly district election, 2000
| Party | Candidate | Votes | % |
|---|---|---|---|
| Democratic | Gloria Negrete McLeod | 51,335 | 54.04 |
| Republican | Dennis R. Yates | 40,751 | 42.90 |
| Libertarian | David Kocot | 2,894 | 3.05 |
| Invalid or blank votes | | 1,089 | 1.13 |
| Total votes | | 96,069 | 100.00 |
| Democratic hold | | | |

=== District 62 ===
California's 62nd State Assembly district election, 2000
| Party | Candidate | Votes | % |
|---|---|---|---|
| Democratic | John Longville (incumbent) | 47,198 | 63.37 |
| Republican | Mary Lou Martinez | 24,628 | 33.07 |
| Libertarian | Henry John Matus | 2,651 | 3.56 |
| Invalid or blank votes | | 0 | 0.00 |
| Total votes | | 74,477 | 100.00 |
| Democratic hold | | | |

=== District 63 ===
California's 63rd State Assembly district election, 2000
| Party | Candidate | Votes | % |
|---|---|---|---|
| Republican | Bill Leonard (incumbent) | 79,896 | 58.30 |
| Democratic | Scott Thomas Stotz | 51,548 | 37.61 |
| Libertarian | Ethel Mohler | 5,603 | 4.09 |
| Invalid or blank votes | | 0 | 0.00 |
| Total votes | | 137,047 | 100.00 |
| Republican hold | | | |

=== District 64 ===
California's 64th State Assembly district election, 2000
| Party | Candidate | Votes | % |
|---|---|---|---|
| Republican | Rod Pacheco (incumbent) | 60,323 | 54.23 |
| Democratic | Jose Medina | 43,698 | 39.28 |
| Natural Law | Annie Wallack | 3,977 | 3.58 |
| Libertarian | Phil Turner | 3,237 | 2.91 |
| Invalid or blank votes | | 0 | 0.00 |
| Total votes | | 111,235 | 100.00 |
| Republican hold | | | |

=== District 65 ===
California's 65th State Assembly district election, 2000
| Party | Candidate | Votes | % |
|---|---|---|---|
| Republican | Janice C. Leja | 58,750 | 47.06 |
| Democratic | Ray R. Quinto | 53,425 | 42.80 |
| Libertarian | Bonnie Flickinger | 10,263 | 8.22 |
| Natural Law | Joseph Ray Renteria | 2,399 | 1.92 |
| Invalid or blank votes | | 0 | 0.00 |
| Total votes | | 124,837 | 100.00 |
| Republican hold | | | |

=== District 66 ===
California's 66th State Assembly district election, 2000
| Party | Candidate | Votes | % |
|---|---|---|---|
| Republican | Dennis Hollingsworth | 112,328 | 63.96 |
| Democratic | Bob Canfield | 55,239 | 31.46 |
| Green | Chuck Reutter | 8,045 | 4.58 |
| Invalid or blank votes | | 3,853 | 2.15 |
| Total votes | | 179,465 | 100.00 |
| Republican hold | | | |

=== District 67 ===
California's 67th State Assembly district election, 2000
| Party | Candidate | Votes | % |
|---|---|---|---|
| Republican | Tom Harman | 93,752 | 62.00 |
| Democratic | Andrew M. Hilbert | 46,202 | 30.56 |
| Libertarian | Autumn Browne | 11,248 | 7.44 |
| Invalid or blank votes | | 17,098 | 10.16 |
| Total votes | | 168,300 | 100.00 |
| Republican hold | | | |

=== District 68 ===
California's 68th State Assembly district election, 2000
| Party | Candidate | Votes | % |
|---|---|---|---|
| Republican | Ken Maddox (incumbent) | 59,258 | 56.70 |
| Democratic | Tina L. Laine | 35,889 | 34.34 |
| Natural Law | Al Snook | 5,466 | 5.23 |
| Libertarian | Richard G. Newhouse | 3,897 | 3.73 |
| Invalid or blank votes | | 9,436 | 8.28 |
| Total votes | | 113,946 | 100.00 |
| Republican hold | | | |

=== District 69 ===
California's 69th State Assembly district election, 2000
| Party | Candidate | Votes | % |
|---|---|---|---|
| Democratic | Lou Correa (incumbent) | 36,581 | 63.33 |
| Republican | Lou D. Lopez | 17,323 | 29.99 |
| Natural Law | Tuan D. Pham | 3,862 | 6.69 |
| Invalid or blank votes | | 4,541 | 7.29 |
| Total votes | | 62,307 | 100.00 |
| Democratic hold | | | |

=== District 70 ===
California's 70th State Assembly district election, 2000
| Party | Candidate | Votes | % |
|---|---|---|---|
| Republican | John Campbell | 96,145 | 59.57 |
| Democratic | Merritt L. McKeon | 54,349 | 33.67 |
| Libertarian | Robert A. Vondruska | 5,324 | 3.30 |
| Natural Law | Barry L. Katz | 3,855 | 2.39 |
| Reform | Raymond O. Mills | 1,736 | 1.08 |
| Invalid or blank votes | | 19,040 | 10.55 |
| Total votes | | 180,449 | 100.00 |
| Republican hold | | | |

=== District 71 ===
California's 71st State Assembly district election, 2000
| Party | Candidate | Votes | % |
|---|---|---|---|
| Republican | William J. Campbell (incumbent) | 120,852 | 66.45 |
| Democratic | Bea Foster | 51,978 | 28.58 |
| Natural Law | Brenda Jo Bryant | 5,137 | 2.82 |
| Libertarian | Brian Lee Cross | 3,891 | 2.14 |
| Invalid or blank votes | | 17,737 | 8.89 |
| Total votes | | 199,595 | 100.00 |
| Republican hold | | | |

=== District 72 ===
California's 72nd State Assembly district election, 2000
| Party | Candidate | Votes | % |
|---|---|---|---|
| Republican | Lynn Daucher (incumbent) | 94,687 | 67.66 |
| Democratic | G. Nanjundappa | 37,655 | 26.91 |
| Natural Law | John W. Zamarra | 7,606 | 5.43 |
| Invalid or blank votes | | 15,084 | 9.73 |
| Total votes | | 155,032 | 100.00 |
| Republican hold | | | |

=== District 73 ===
California's 73rd State Assembly district election, 2000
| Party | Candidate | Votes | % |
|---|---|---|---|
| Republican | Patricia Bates (incumbent) | 93,035 | 64.82 |
| Democratic | Robert D. Wilberg | 40,784 | 28.42 |
| Libertarian | Paul King | 6,473 | 4.51 |
| Natural Law | Paul Fisher | 3,231 | 2.25 |
| Invalid or blank votes | | 16,829 | 10.50 |
| Total votes | | 160,352 | 100.00 |
| Republican hold | | | |

=== District 74 ===
California's 74th State Assembly district election, 2000
| Party | Candidate | Votes | % |
|---|---|---|---|
| Republican | Mark Wyland | 86,384 | 57.33 |
| Democratic | John Herrera | 51,213 | 33.99 |
| Natural Law | Barbara Bourdette | 7,242 | 4.81 |
| Libertarian | Thomas M. Hohman | 5,827 | 3.87 |
| Invalid or blank votes | | 19,821 | 11.63 |
| Total votes | | 170,487 | 100.00 |
| Republican hold | | | |

=== District 75 ===
California's 75th State Assembly district election, 2000
| Party | Candidate | Votes | % |
|---|---|---|---|
| Republican | Charlene Zettel (incumbent) | 103,545 | 64.04 |
| Democratic | Judith K. Walters | 50,005 | 30.93 |
| Libertarian | Gary Walter Pietila | 8,136 | 5.03 |
| Invalid or blank votes | | 22,912 | 12.41 |
| Total votes | | 184,598 | 100.00 |
| Republican hold | | | |

=== District 76 ===
California's 76th State Assembly district election, 2000
| Party | Candidate | Votes | % |
|---|---|---|---|
| Democratic | Christine Kehoe | 82,965 | 61.09 |
| Republican | Michelle M. Nash-Hoff | 47,295 | 34.83 |
| Libertarian | David T. Oakey | 5,544 | 4.08 |
| Invalid or blank votes | | 13,129 | 8.82 |
| Total votes | | 148,933 | 100.00 |
| Democratic hold | | | |

=== District 77 ===
California's 77th State Assembly district election, 2000
| Party | Candidate | Votes | % |
|---|---|---|---|
| Republican | Jay La Suer | 66,645 | 52.25 |
| Democratic | Todd Keegan | 52,554 | 41.20 |
| Libertarian | Michael S. Metti | 8,351 | 6.55 |
| Invalid or blank votes | | 13,078 | 9.30 |
| Total votes | | 140,628 | 100.00 |
| Republican hold | | | |

=== District 78 ===
California's 78th State Assembly district election, 2000
| Party | Candidate | Votes | % |
|---|---|---|---|
| Democratic | Howard Wayne (incumbent) | 79,764 | 56.06 |
| Republican | John Steel | 54,700 | 38.44 |
| Libertarian | Dennis Triglia | 5,978 | 4.20 |
| Natural Law | Raymond C. Wingfield | 1,840 | 1.29 |
| Invalid or blank votes | | 15,357 | 9.74 |
| Total votes | | 157,639 | 100.00 |
| Democratic hold | | | |

=== District 79 ===
California's 79th State Assembly district election, 2000
| Party | Candidate | Votes | % |
|---|---|---|---|
| Democratic | Juan Vargas | 55,689 | 77.38 |
| Republican | Jon Parungao | 13,708 | 19.05 |
| Libertarian | Richard J. Cardulla | 2,572 | 3.57 |
| Invalid or blank votes | | 4,783 | 6.23 |
| Total votes | | 76,752 | 100.00 |
| Democratic hold | | | |

=== District 80 ===
California's 80th State Assembly district election, 2000
| Party | Candidate | Votes | % |
|---|---|---|---|
| Republican | David G. Kelley (incumbent) | 63,848 | 52.15 |
| Democratic | Joey Acuna, Jr. | 53,849 | 43.99 |
| Libertarian | Susan Marie Weber | 4,728 | 3.86 |
| Invalid or blank votes | | 1,961 | 1.58 |
| Total votes | | 124,386 | 100.00 |
| Republican hold | | | |

== See also ==
- California State Senate
- California State Senate elections, 2000
- California State Assembly Districts
- California state elections, 2000
- Districts in California
- Political party strength in California
- Political party strength in U.S. states
