= 2002 California State Assembly election =

- November 2, 2002

All 80 seats in the California State Assembly 41 seats needed for a majority
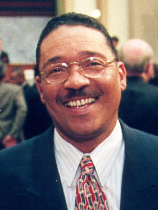

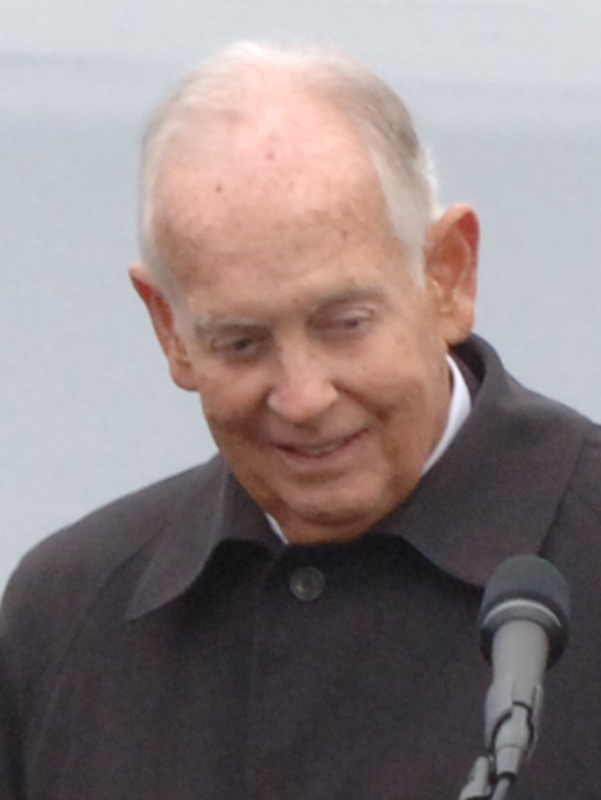
	Majority party	Minority party
Leader	Herb Wesson	Dave Cox
Party	Democratic	Republican
Leader's seat	47th–Los Angeles	5th–Fair Oaks
Last election	50 seats, 57.05%	30 seats, 38.69%
Seats won	48	32
Seat change	▼2	▲2
Popular vote	3,686,124	3,018,783
Percentage	53.41%	43.74%
Swing	▼3.64pp	Steady
- Republican gain Democratic hold Republican hold 40–50% 50–60% 60–70% 70–80% 80–90% >90% 40–50% 50–60% 60–70% 70–80%
Speaker before election
Herb Wesson
Democratic
Elected Speaker
Herb Wesson
Democratic

The 2002 California State Assembly elections were held on November 5, 2002. California's State Assembly in its entirety comes up for election in even numbered years. Each seat has a two-year term and members are limited to three 2-year terms (six years). All 80 biennially elected seats in the Assembly were up for election this year. Democrats retained control of the Assembly, though they lost two seats.

== Predictions ==
Source	Ranking	As of
The Cook; Political Report	Safe D	October 4, 2002

== Overview ==
California State Assembly elections, 2002
Party	Votes	Percentage	Incumbents	Open	Before	After	+/–
Democratic	3,686,124	53.41%	32	18	50	48	-2
Republican	3,018,783	43.74%	16	14	30	32	+2
Libertarian	162,472	2.35%	0	0	0	0	0
Green	30,160	0.44%	0	0	0	0	0
Reform	3,806	0.06%	0	0	0	0	0
Invalid or blank votes	486,319	6.58%	—	—	—	—	—
Totals	7,387,664	100.00%	48	32	80	80	—

↓
48	32
Democratic	Republican

== Results ==
Final results from the California Secretary of State:

=== District 1 ===
California's 1st State Assembly district election, 2002
Party	Candidate	Votes	%
Democratic	Patty Berg	64,065	48.6
Republican	Robert K. "Bob" Brown	52,659	39.9
Green	Doug Riley Thron	15,315	11.5
Invalid or blank votes		6,906	5.0
Total votes		138,945	100.0
Democratic hold			

=== District 2 ===
California's 2nd State Assembly district election, 2002
Party	Candidate	Votes	%
Republican	Doug LaMalfa	79,361	67.4
Democratic	Doug Kinyon	34,524	29.3
Libertarian	Pete Bret	3,996	3.3
Invalid or blank votes		8,414	6.7
Total votes		125,295	100.0
Republican hold			

=== District 3 ===
California's 3rd State Assembly district election, 2002
Party	Candidate	Votes	%
Republican	Rick Keene	78,225	61.5
Democratic	Stuart Randall King	43,096	33.8
Libertarian	Jon Petersen	5,987	4.7
Invalid or blank votes		2,863	2.2
Total votes		130,171	100.0
Republican hold			

=== District 4 ===
California's 4th State Assembly district election, 2002
Party	Candidate	Votes	%
Republican	Tim Leslie (incumbent)	91,022	66.6
Democratic	Scott Warren	45,722	33.4
Invalid or blank votes		9,295	6.4
Total votes		146,039	100.0
Republican hold			

=== District 5 ===
California's 5th State Assembly district election, 2002
Party	Candidate	Votes	%
Republican	Dave Cox (incumbent)	79,527	65.2
Democratic	Eric Ulis	37,277	30.5
Libertarian	Roberto Liebman	5,336	4.3
Invalid or blank votes		502	0.4
Total votes		122,642	100.0
Republican hold			

=== District 6 ===
California's 6th State Assembly district election, 2002
Party	Candidate	Votes	%
Democratic	Joe Nation (incumbent)	96,157	69.3
Republican	Kenneth Hitt	37,375	26.8
Libertarian	Richard Olmstead	5,423	3.9
Invalid or blank votes		9,622	6.5
Total votes		148,577	100.0
Democratic hold			

=== District 7 ===
California's 7th State Assembly district election, 2002
Party	Candidate	Votes	%
Democratic	Pat Wiggins (incumbent)	77,401	76.1
Libertarian	David J. Kozlowski	24,386	23.9
Invalid or blank votes		15,926	13.5
Total votes		117,713	100.0
Democratic hold			

=== District 8 ===
California's 8th State Assembly district election, 2002
Party	Candidate	Votes	%
Democratic	Lois Wolk	57,360	58.1
Republican	John R. Munn	41,482	41.9
Invalid or blank votes		5,207	5.0
Total votes		104,049	100.0
Democratic hold			

=== District 9 ===
California's 9th State Assembly district election, 2002
Party	Candidate	Votes	%
Democratic	Darrell Steinberg	58,883	69.9
Republican	David A. Pegos	22,146	26.2
Libertarian	Douglas M. Poston	3,322	3.9
Invalid or blank votes		0	0.0
Total votes		84,351	100.0
Democratic hold			

=== District 10 ===
California's 10th State Assembly district election, 2002
Party	Candidate	Votes	%
Republican	Alan Nakanishi	72,302	60.2
Democratic	Katherine E. Maestas	47,904	39.8
Invalid or blank votes		4,087	3.3
Total votes		124,293	100.0
Republican hold			

=== District 11 ===
California's 11th State Assembly district election, 2002
Party	Candidate	Votes	%
Democratic	Joe Cancimalla (incumbent)	61,969	65.0
Republican	Jan Leslie Denny	29,741	31.1
Libertarian	Frank Manske	3,752	3.9
Invalid or blank votes		6,809	6.7
Total votes		102,271	100.0
Democratic hold			

=== District 12 ===
California's 12th State Assembly district election, 2002
Party	Candidate	Votes	%
Democratic	Leland Yee	72,166	77.8
Republican	Howard Epstein	14,699	15.8
Libertarian	Michael Denny	5,985	6.4
Invalid or blank votes		0	0.0
Total votes		92,850	100.0
Democratic hold			

=== District 13 ===
California's 13th State Assembly district election, 2002
Party	Candidate	Votes	%
Democratic	Mark Leno	89,921	81.5
Republican	Gail E. Neira	15,278	13.9
Libertarian	Christopher R. Maden	5,134	4.6
Invalid or blank votes		0	0.0
Total votes		110,333	100.0
Democratic hold			

=== District 14 ===
California's 14th State Assembly district election, 2002
Party	Candidate	Votes	%
Democratic	Loni Hancock	102,373	100.0
Invalid or blank votes		38,671	27.4
Total votes		141,044	100.0
Democratic hold			

=== District 15 ===
California's 15th State Assembly district election, 2002
Party	Candidate	Votes	%
Republican	Guy Houston	73,322	53.7
Democratic	Donna Gerber	63,349	46.3
Invalid or blank votes		5,330	3.8
Total votes		142,001	100.0
Republican hold			

=== District 16 ===
California's 16th State Assembly district election, 2002
Party	Candidate	Votes	%
Democratic	Wilma Chan (incumbent)	77,744	84.2
Republican	George J. Nugent	11,634	12.6
Libertarian	Richard E. Armstrong	2,976	3.2
Invalid or blank votes		7,902	7.9
Total votes		100,256	100.0
Democratic hold			

=== District 17 ===
California's 17th State Assembly district election, 2002
Party	Candidate	Votes	%
Democratic	Barbara S. Matthews (incumbent)	42,504	56.5
Republican	Brian McCabe	32,726	43.5
Invalid or blank votes		4,123	5.2
Total votes		79,353	100.0
Democratic hold			

=== District 18 ===
California's 18th State Assembly district election, 2002
Party	Candidate	Votes	%
Democratic	Ellen M. Corbett (incumbent)	60,627	71.7
Republican	Jack Hovingh	24,028	28.3
Invalid or blank votes		7,280	7.9
Total votes		91,935	100.0
Democratic hold			

=== District 19 ===
California's 19th State Assembly district election, 2002
Party	Candidate	Votes	%
Democratic	Gene Mullin	62,972	62.7
Republican	David Kawas	25,668	25.6
Green	Jo Chamberlain	9,992	9.9
Libertarian	Robert Giedt	1,856	1.8
Invalid or blank votes		0	0.0
Total votes		100,488	100.0
Democratic hold			

=== District 20 ===
California's 20th State Assembly district election, 2002
Party	Candidate	Votes	%
Democratic	John A. Dutra (incumbent)	53,304	66.6
Republican	Daniel L. Dow	23,108	28.9
Libertarian	Keith Lyon	3,663	4.5
Invalid or blank votes		6,853	7.9
Total votes		86,928	100.0
Democratic hold			

=== District 21 ===
California's 21st State Assembly district election, 2002
Party	Candidate	Votes	%
Democratic	Joe Simitian (incumbent)	72,104	60.5
Republican	James A. Russell	42,808	36.0
Libertarian	Raymond M. Bell, Jr.	4,286	3.5
Invalid or blank votes		6,201	4.9
Total votes		125,399	100.0
Democratic hold			

=== District 22 ===
California's 22nd State Assembly district election, 2002
Party	Candidate	Votes	%
Democratic	Sally Lieber	48,543	58.5
Republican	Stan Kawczynski	30,555	36.7
Libertarian	Kennita Watson	4,003	4.8
Invalid or blank votes		7,833	8.6
Total votes		90,934	100.0
Democratic hold			

=== District 23 ===
California's 23rd State Assembly district election, 2002
Party	Candidate	Votes	%
Democratic	Manny Diaz (incumbent)	42,461	81.6
Green	Warner S. Bloomberg III	9,610	18.4
Invalid or blank votes		8,220	13.6
Total votes		60,291	100.0
Democratic hold			

=== District 24 ===
California's 24th State Assembly district election, 2002
Party	Candidate	Votes	%
Democratic	Rebecca Cohn	69,992	100.0
Invalid or blank votes		37,411	34.8
Total votes		107,403	100.0
Democratic hold			

=== District 25 ===
California's 25th State Assembly district election, 2002
Party	Candidate	Votes	%
Republican	Dave Cogdill (incumbent)	68,949	62.2
Democratic	E. Denise Smith	42,034	37.8
Invalid or blank votes		7,380	6.2
Total votes		118,363	100.0
Republican hold			

=== District 26 ===
California's 26th State Assembly district election, 2002
Party	Candidate	Votes	%
Republican	Greg Aghazarian	48,540	57.4
Democratic	Tom Hallinan	36,069	42.6
Invalid or blank votes		7,019	7.7
Total votes		91,628	100.0
Republican gain from Democratic			

=== District 27 ===
California's 27th State Assembly district election, 2002
Party	Candidate	Votes	%
Democratic	John Laird	77,212	61.4
Republican	Charles Clayton Carter	44,444	35.2
Libertarian	Gordon Donald Sachtjen	4,294	3.4
Invalid or blank votes		5,525	4.2
Total votes		131,475	100.0
Democratic hold			

=== District 28 ===
California's 28th State Assembly district election, 2002
Party	Candidate	Votes	%
Democratic	Simon Salinas (incumbent)	43,555	61.0
Republican	Jane Howard	27,945	39.0
Invalid or blank votes		4,504	5.9
Total votes		76,004	100.0
Democratic hold			

=== District 29 ===
California's 29th State Assembly district election, 2002
Party	Candidate	Votes	%
Republican	Steven N. Samuelian	63,011	60.9
Democratic	Richard Martinez, Jr.	36,977	35.7
Libertarian	Jonathan Zwickel	3,613	3.4
Invalid or blank votes		6,967	6.3
Total votes		110,568	100.0
Republican hold			

=== District 30 ===
California's 30th State Assembly district election, 2002
Party	Candidate	Votes	%
Democratic	Nicole Parra	26,586	50.3
Republican	Dean Gardner	26,320	49.7
Invalid or blank votes		901	1.7
Total votes		53,807	100.0
Democratic hold			

=== District 31 ===
California's 31st State Assembly district election, 2002
Party	Candidate	Votes	%
Democratic	Sarah L. Reyes (incumbent)	41,050	100.0
Invalid or blank votes		15,931	28.0
Total votes		56,981	100.0
Democratic hold			

=== District 32 ===
California's 32nd State Assembly district election, 2002
Party	Candidate	Votes	%
Republican	Kevin McCarthy	78,229	75.9
Democratic	Michael A. Shea, III	24,912	24.1
Invalid or blank votes		32	0.0
Total votes		103,173	100.0
Republican hold			

=== District 33 ===
California's 33rd State Assembly district election, 2002
Party	Candidate	Votes	%
Republican	Abel Maldonado (incumbent)	76,590	62.7
Democratic	Laurence D. Houlgate	45,598	37.3
Invalid or blank votes		2,550	2.0
Total votes		124,738	100.0
Republican hold			

=== District 34 ===
California's 34th State Assembly district election, 2002
Party	Candidate	Votes	%
Republican	Bill Maze	48,625	65.3
Democratic	Virginia R. Gurrola	25,671	34.5
No party	Joshua Miller (write-in)	221	0.2
Invalid or blank votes		2,533	3.3
Total votes		77,050	100.0
Republican hold			

=== District 35 ===
California's 35th State Assembly district election, 2002
Party	Candidate	Votes	%
Democratic	Hannah-Beth Jackson (incumbent)	72,394	61.7
Republican	Bob Pohl	37,026	31.6
Reform	Cary Savitch	3,827	3.3
Libertarian	Craig Warren Thomas	3,051	2.5
No party	Christina Carreno Martin (write-in)	1,095	0.9
Invalid or blank votes		2,799	2.3
Total votes		120,192	100.0
Democratic hold			

=== District 36 ===
California's 36th State Assembly district election, 2002
Party	Candidate	Votes	%
Republican	Sharon Runner	46,438	64.0
Democratic	Robert Davenport	26,230	36.0
Invalid or blank votes		4,344	5.6
Total votes		84,667	100.0
Republican hold			

=== District 37 ===
California's 37th State Assembly district election, 2002
Party	Candidate	Votes	%
Republican	Tony Strickland (incumbent)	74,876	63.1
Democratic	Bruce James Thomas, Jr.	43,806	36.9
Invalid or blank votes		5,771	4.6
Total votes		124,453	100.0
Republican hold			

=== District 38 ===
California's 38th State Assembly district election, 2002
Party	Candidate	Votes	%
Republican	Keith Richman (incumbent)	64,757	60.9
Democratic	Paula L. Calderon	37,626	35.3
Libertarian	Karl Lembke	4,099	3.8
Invalid or blank votes		8,216	7.2
Total votes		114,698	100.0
Republican hold			

=== District 39 ===
California's 39th State Assembly district election, 2002
Party	Candidate	Votes	%
Democratic	Cindy Montañez	36,449	76.1
Republican	Ely De La Cruz Ayao	11,449	23.9
Invalid or blank votes		4,834	9.2
Total votes		52,732	100.0
Democratic hold			

=== District 40 ===
California's 40th State Assembly district election, 2002
Party	Candidate	Votes	%
Democratic	Lloyd E. Levine	44,191	56.5
Republican	Connie Friedman	34,038	43.5
Invalid or blank votes		8,269	9.6
Total votes		86,498	100.0
Democratic hold			

=== District 41 ===
California's 41st State Assembly district election, 2002
Party	Candidate	Votes	%
Democratic	Fran Pavley (incumbent)	71,614	61.5
Republican	Michael J. Wissot	40,708	34.9
Libertarian	Brian "Max" Kelly	4,244	3.6
Invalid or blank votes		8,358	6.7
Total votes		124,924	100.0
Democratic hold			

=== District 42 ===
California's 42nd State Assembly district election, 2002
Party	Candidate	Votes	%
Democratic	Paul Koretz (incumbent)	84,012	74.4
Republican	Jeffrey A. Bissiri	29,049	25.6
Invalid or blank votes		10,264	8.3
Total votes		123,325	100.0
Democratic hold			

=== District 43 ===
California's 43rd State Assembly district election, 2002
Party	Candidate	Votes	%
Democratic	Dario Frommer (incumbent)	46,458	61.0
Republican	Ingrid Geyer	26,590	34.8
Libertarian	Sandor J. Woren	3,209	4.2
Invalid or blank votes		5,736	7.0
Total votes		81,993	100.0
Democratic hold			

=== District 44 ===
California's 44th State Assembly district election, 2002
Party	Candidate	Votes	%
Democratic	Carol Liu (incumbent)	60,570	60.2
Republican	Dan O'Connell	37,112	36.9
Libertarian	Bob New	3,015	2.9
Invalid or blank votes		5,466	5.1
Total votes		106,163	100.0
Democratic hold			

=== District 45 ===
California's 45th State Assembly district election, 2002
Party	Candidate	Votes	%
Democratic	Jackie Goldberg (incumbent)	40,341	85.6
Libertarian	Judy Chau Phuong Cook	6,799	14.4
Invalid or blank votes		6,289	11.8
Total votes		53,429	100.0
Democratic hold			

=== District 46 ===
California's 46th State Assembly district election, 2002
Party	Candidate	Votes	%
Democratic	Fabian Núñez	27,227	85.6
Republican	Manuel "Manny" Aldana, Jr.	6,799	14.4
Invalid or blank votes		3,463	11.8
Total votes		37,489	100.0
Democratic hold			

=== District 47 ===
California's 47th State Assembly district election, 2002
Party	Candidate	Votes	%
Democratic	Herb Wesson (incumbent)	72,792	81.9
Republican	Jonathan Leonard	13,395	15.1
Libertarian	Keith Clemens	2,757	3.0
Invalid or blank votes		7,519	7.8
Total votes		96,463	100.0
Democratic hold			

=== District 48 ===
California's 48th State Assembly district election, 2002
Party	Candidate	Votes	%
Democratic	Mark Ridley-Thomas	41,280	87.6
Republican	Gerard Toussaint Robinson	4,427	9.4
Libertarian	Nolayan O. Herdegen	1,421	3.0
Invalid or blank votes		4,386	8.5
Total votes		51,514	100.0
Democratic hold			

=== District 49 ===
California's 49th State Assembly district election, 2002
Party	Candidate	Votes	%
Democratic	Judy Chu (incumbent)	37,680	67.2
Republican	George C. Shen	18,461	32.8
Invalid or blank votes		4,803	7.9
Total votes		60,944	100.0
Democratic hold			

=== District 50 ===
California's 50th State Assembly district election, 2002
Party	Candidate	Votes	%
Democratic	Marco Antonio Firebaugh (inc.)	31,281	73.2
Republican	Gladys O. Miller	11,499	26.8
Invalid or blank votes		3,964	8.5
Total votes		46,744	100.0
Democratic hold			

=== District 51 ===
California's 51st State Assembly district election, 2002
Party	Candidate	Votes	%
Democratic	Jerome Horton (incumbent)	50,191	100.0
Invalid or blank votes		19,910	28.4
Total votes		70,101	100.0
Democratic hold			

=== District 52 ===
California's 52nd State Assembly district election, 2002
Party	Candidate	Votes	%
Democratic	Mervyn M. Dymally	36,282	89.6
Republican	Mark Anthony Iles	4,244	10.4
Invalid or blank votes		3,380	7.7
Total votes		43,906	100.0
Democratic hold			

=== District 53 ===
California's 53rd State Assembly district election, 2002
Party	Candidate	Votes	%
Democratic	George Nakano (incumbent)	69,135	61.4
Republican	Linda P. Wilson	43,589	38.6
Invalid or blank votes		6,254	5.3
Total votes		118,978	100.0
Democratic hold			

=== District 54 ===
California's 54th State Assembly district election, 2002
Party	Candidate	Votes	%
Democratic	Alan Lowenthal (incumbent)	59,726	60.1
Republican	Cesar N. Castellanos	39,714	39.9
Invalid or blank votes		5,873	5.6
Total votes		105,313	100.0
Democratic hold			

=== District 55 ===
California's 55th State Assembly district election, 2002
Party	Candidate	Votes	%
Democratic	Jenny Oropeza (incumbent)	48,299	79.9
Libertarian	Guy Wilson	11,693	19.3
No party	Margherita Underhill (write-in)	525	0.8
Invalid or blank votes		8,816	12.7
Total votes		69,333	100.0
Democratic hold			

=== District 56 ===
California's 56th State Assembly district election, 2002
Party	Candidate	Votes	%
Democratic	Rudy Bermudez	39,519	61.5
Republican	John Brantuk	24,751	38.5
Invalid or blank votes		3,991	5.8
Total votes		68,261	100.0
Democratic hold			

=== District 57 ===
California's 57th State Assembly district election, 2002
Party	Candidate	Votes	%
Democratic	Ed Chavez (incumbent)	39,341	65.0
Republican	Anne M. Moll	19,677	32.5
Libertarian	Leland Thomas Faegre	1,520	2.5
Invalid or blank votes		3,870	6.0
Total votes		64,408	100.0
Democratic hold			

=== District 58 ===
California's 58th State Assembly district election, 2002
Party	Candidate	Votes	%
Democratic	Ronald S. Calderon	44,997	63.5
Republican	Dave Butler	25,903	36.5
Invalid or blank votes		5,520	7.2
Total votes		76,420	100.0
Democratic hold			

=== District 59 ===
California's 59th State Assembly district election, 2002
Party	Candidate	Votes	%
Republican	Dennis L. Mountjoy (incumbent)	65,439	63.4
Democratic	Patrick D. Smith	37,788	36.6
Invalid or blank votes		7,761	7.0
Total votes		110,988	100.0
Republican hold			

=== District 60 ===
California's 60th State Assembly district election, 2002
Party	Candidate	Votes	%
Republican	Robert Pacheco (incumbent)	62,260	68.1
Democratic	Adrian Lincoln Martinez	27,964	31.9
Invalid or blank votes		3,829	4.1
Total votes		94,053	100.0
Republican hold			

=== District 61 ===
California's 61st State Assembly district election, 2002
Party	Candidate	Votes	%
Democratic	Gloria Negrete McLeod (incumbent)	31,084	62.5
Republican	Matthew Munson	18,679	37.5
Invalid or blank votes		3,955	7.4
Total votes		53,718	100.0
Democratic hold			

=== District 62 ===
California's 62nd State Assembly district election, 2002
Party	Candidate	Votes	%
Democratic	John Longville (incumbent)	28,744	69.3
Republican	G. Edward Scott	12,761	30.7
Invalid or blank votes		3,633	8.0
Total votes		45,138	100.0
Democratic hold			

=== District 63 ===
California's 63rd State Assembly district election, 2002
Party	Candidate	Votes	%
Republican	Robert Dutton	49,480	61.0
Democratic	Doris Wallace	31,759	39.0
Invalid or blank votes		7,650	8.6
Total votes		88,889	100.0
Republican hold			

=== District 64 ===
California's 64th State Assembly district election, 2002
Party	Candidate	Votes	%
Republican	John J. Benoit	55,351	63.3
Democratic	Robert Melsh	32,118	36.7
Invalid or blank votes		0	0.0
Total votes		87,469	100.0
Republican hold			

=== District 65 ===
California's 65th State Assembly district election, 2002
Party	Candidate	Votes	%
Republican	Russ Bogh (incumbent)	56,598	63.4
Democratic	Darrel R. Scholes	32,749	36.6
Invalid or blank votes		2,555	2.8
Total votes		91,902	100.0
Republican hold			

=== District 66 ===
California's 66th State Assembly district election, 2002
Party	Candidate	Votes	%
Republican	Ray Haynes (incumbent)	55,205	68.1
Democratic	David G. Brostrom	25,930	31.9
Invalid or blank votes		2,246	2.7
Total votes		83,381	100.0
Republican hold			

=== District 67 ===
California's 67th State Assembly district election, 2002
Party	Candidate	Votes	%
Republican	Tom Harman (incumbent)	69,420	68.8
Democratic	William R. "Bill" Orton	31,593	31.2
Invalid or blank votes		0	0.0
Total votes		101,013	100.0
Republican hold			

=== District 68 ===
California's 68th State Assembly district election, 2002
Party	Candidate	Votes	%
Republican	Ken Maddox (incumbent)	51,316	65.1
Democratic	Al Snook	23,721	30.1
Libertarian	Douglas J. Scribner	3,810	4.8
Invalid or blank votes		0	0.0
Total votes		78,847	100.0
Republican hold			

=== District 69 ===
California's 69th State Assembly district election, 2002
Party	Candidate	Votes	%
Democratic	Lou Correa (incumbent)	25,392	65.4
Republican	Reuben Ross	13,487	34.6
Invalid or blank votes		0	0.0
Total votes		38,879	100.0
Democratic hold			

=== District 70 ===
California's 70th State Assembly district election, 2002
Party	Candidate	Votes	%
Republican	John Campbell (incumbent)	73,880	66.9
Democratic	John Kane	33,449	30.2
Libertarian	Paul L. Studier	3,215	2.9
Invalid or blank votes		0	0.0
Total votes		110,544	100.0
Republican hold			

=== District 71 ===
California's 71st State Assembly district election, 2002
Party	Candidate	Votes	%
Republican	Todd Spitzer	69,764	73.1
Democratic	Bea Foster	25,770	26.9
Invalid or blank votes		0	0.0
Total votes		95,534	100.0
Republican hold			

=== District 72 ===
California's 72nd State Assembly district election, 2002
Party	Candidate	Votes	%
Republican	Lynn Daucher (incumbent)	54,505	68.1
Democratic	G. Nanjundappa	22,236	27.8
Libertarian	Brian Lee Cross	3,300	4.1
Invalid or blank votes		0	0.0
Total votes		80,041	100.0
Republican hold			

=== District 73 ===
California's 73rd State Assembly district election, 2002
Party	Candidate	Votes	%
Republican	Patricia Bates (incumbent)	64,271	67.6
Democratic	Kathleen Calzada	27,104	28.5
Libertarian	Bob Vondruska	3,721	3.9
Invalid or blank votes		3,000	3.1
Total votes		98,096	100.0
Republican hold			

=== District 74 ===
California's 74th State Assembly district election, 2002
Party	Candidate	Votes	%
Republican	Mark Wyland (incumbent)	66,276	61.0
Democratic	John Herrera	36,315	33.3
Libertarian	Kristi Stone	6,203	5.7
Invalid or blank votes		9,294	7.9
Total votes		118,088	100.0
Republican hold			

=== District 75 ===
California's 75th State Assembly district election, 2002
Party	Candidate	Votes	%
Republican	George A. Plescia	64,452	58.6
Democratic	Connie Witt	42,557	38.6
Libertarian	Richard J. Senecal	3,147	2.8
Invalid or blank votes		11,153	9.2
Total votes		121,309	100.0
Republican hold			

=== District 76 ===
California's 76th State Assembly district election, 2002
Party	Candidate	Votes	%
Democratic	Christine Kehoe (incumbent)	63,682	62.4
Republican	Bob Divine	34,872	34.1
Libertarian	Sarah N. Baker	3,580	3.5
Invalid or blank votes		6,159	5.7
Total votes		108,293	100.0
Democratic hold			

=== District 77 ===
California's 77th State Assembly district election, 2002
Party	Candidate	Votes	%
Republican	Jay La Suer (incumbent)	70,315	66.5
Democratic	Sarah Lowery	30,270	28.6
Libertarian	Virgil (Randy) Hall II	5,247	4.9
Invalid or blank votes		9,200	8.0
Total votes		115,032	100.0
Republican hold			

=== District 78 ===
California's 78th State Assembly district election, 2002
Party	Candidate	Votes	%
Republican	Shirley Horton	45,826	49.4
Democratic	Vincent Hall	44,247	47.6
Libertarian	Mark Menanno	2,819	3.0
Invalid or blank votes		5,429	5.5
Total votes		98,321	100.0
Republican gain from Democratic			

=== District 79 ===
California's 79th State Assembly district election, 2002
Party	Candidate	Votes	%
Democratic	Juan Vargas (incumbent)	37,479	65.9
Republican	Mark W. Fast	17,195	30.2
Libertarian	Joshua Castro	2,268	3.9
Invalid or blank votes		3,388	5.6
Total votes		60,330	100.0
Democratic hold			

=== District 80 ===
California's 80th State Assembly district election, 2002
Party	Candidate	Votes	%
Republican	Bonnie Garcia	36,254	51.8
Democratic	Joey Acuna, Jr.	33,757	48.2
Invalid or blank votes		2,175	3.0
Total votes		72,186	100.0
Republican hold			

== See also ==
- California State Senate
- California State Senate elections, 2002
- California State Assembly Districts
- California state elections, 2002
- Districts in California
- Political party strength in California
- Political party strength in U.S. states
