= California's 33rd State Assembly district =

American legislative district

Current assemblymember
Alexandra Macedo; R–Tulare
- Population (2020) • Voting age • Citizen voting age: 505,368; 351,645; 271,817
- Demographics: 22.43% White; 1.83% Black; 69.12% Latino; 3.17% Asian; 0.63% Native American; 0.13% Hawaiian/Pacific Islander; 0.47% other; 2.21% remainder of multiracial
- Registered voters: 211,670
- Registration: 37.06% Republican; 33.02% Democratic; 21.69% No party preference

California's 33rd State Assembly district is one of 80 California State Assembly districts. It is currently represented by Republican Alexandra Macedo of Tulare.

== District profile ==
The district, one of the largest in California, encompasses a wide expanse of the High Desert, stretching from the Victor Valley to the Nevada and Arizona borders. It also includes several communities in the San Bernardino Mountains. The district's population is mostly concentrated in the southwest, with scattered settlements elsewhere.

San Bernardino County – 23.1%

- Adelanto
- Apple Valley
- Baker
- Barstow
- Big Bear City
- Big Bear Lake
- Big River
- Crestline
- Helendale
- Hesperia
- Lake Arrowhead
- Lenwood
- Lucerne Valley
- Needles
- Phelan – partial
- Running Springs
- Trona
- Victorville

== Election results from statewide races ==
Year	Office	Results
2021	Recall	Yes 60.6 – 39.4%
2020	President	Trump 54.2 – 43.6%
2018	Governor	Cox 60.2 – 39.8%
2018	Senator	De Leon 54.0 – 46.0%
2016	President	Trump 54.6 – 40.0%
2016	Senator	Harris 52.9 – 47.1%
2014	Governor	Kashkari 63.5 – 36.5%
2012	President	Romney 55.5 – 41.8%
2012	Senator	Emken 56.4 – 43.6%

== List of assembly members representing the district ==
Due to redistricting, the 33rd district has been moved around different parts of the state. The current iteration resulted from the 2021 redistricting by the California Citizens Redistricting Commission.

Assembly members	Party	Years served	Counties represented	Notes
William B. May	Republican	January 5, 1885 – January 3, 1887	San Francisco	
James J. Callaghan	Democratic	January 3, 1887 – January 7, 1889	San Francisco	
William E. Dinan	Democratic	January 7, 1889 – January 5, 1891	San Francisco	
F. L. Jones	Republican	January 5, 1891 – January 2, 1893	San Francisco	
M. J. Hurley	Democratic	January 2, 1893 – January 7, 1895	San Francisco	
Lawrence J. Dwyer	Democratic	January 7, 1895 – January 4, 1897	San Francisco	
George B. Godfrey	Democratic	January 4, 1897 – January 2, 1899	San Francisco	
Eugene D. Sullivan	Democratic	January 2, 1899 – January 1, 1901	San Francisco	
John Butler	Republican	January 1, 1901 – January 5, 1903	San Francisco	
Matthew J. Kerrigan	Democratic	January 5, 1903 – January 2, 1905	San Francisco	
Fred J. Meincke	Republican	January 2, 1905 – January 7, 1907	San Francisco	
Paul F. Fratessa	Republican	January 7, 1907 – January 4, 1909	San Francisco	
Bernard Joseph Collum	Democratic	January 4, 1909 – January 2, 1911	San Francisco	
James J. Ryan	Republican	January 2, 1911 – January 6, 1913	San Francisco	
Victor J. Canepa	Republican	January 6, 1913 – January 8, 1917	San Francisco	
Victor J. Canepa	Prohibition	January 6, 1913 – January 8, 1917	San Francisco	
Leo R. Friedman	Republican	January 8, 1917 – January 6, 1919	San Francisco	
John B. Badaracco	Democratic	January 6, 1919 – January 5, 1925	San Francisco	
Charles A. Oliva	Republican	January 5, 1925 – January 2, 1933	San Francisco	
Clarence Ray Robinson	Republican	January 2, 1933 – January 7, 1935	Madera, Mariposa, Merced	
James D. Garibaldi	Democratic	January 7, 1935 – January 2, 1939	Madera, Merced	
George A. Clarke	Republican	January 2, 1939 – January 4, 1943	Madera, Merced	
Frederick Weybret	Republican	January 4, 1943 – January 8, 1945	Monterey, San Luis Obispo	
Fred Emlay	Democratic	January 8, 1945 – January 6, 1947	Monterey, San Luis Obispo	
James W. Silliman	Republican	January 6, 1947 – January 5, 1953	Monterey, San Luis Obispo	
William W. Hansen	Republican	January 5, 1953 – January 5, 1959	Fresno	
Charles B. Garrigus	Democratic	January 5, 1959 – January 2, 1967	Fresno	
Ernest N. Mobley	Republican	January 2, 1967 – November 30, 1974	Fresno, Madera	
Bill Thomas	Republican	December 2, 1974 – November 30, 1978	Kern	
Don Rogers	Republican	December 4, 1978 – November 30, 1986	Kern	
Don Rogers	Republican	December 4, 1978 – November 30, 1986	Kern, Tulare	
Trice Harvey	Republican	December 1, 1986 – November 30, 1992	Kern, Tulare	
Andrea Seastrand	Republican	December 7, 1992 – November 30, 1994	Monterey, San Luis Obispo, Santa Barbara	
Tom J. Bordonaro Jr.	Republican	December 5, 1994 – November 30, 1998	San Luis Obispo, Santa Barbara	
Abel Maldonado	Republican	December 7, 1998 – November 30, 2004	San Luis Obispo, Santa Barbara	
Sam Blakeslee	Republican	December 6, 2004 – August 23, 2010	San Luis Obispo, Santa Barbara	Resigned from the California State Assembly after winning special for California's 15th State Senate district.
Vacant		August 23, 2010 – December 6, 2010	San Luis Obispo, Santa Barbara	
Katcho Achadjian	Republican	December 6, 2010 – November 30, 2012	San Luis Obispo, Santa Barbara	
Tim Donnelly	Republican	December 3, 2012 – November 30, 2014	San Bernardino	
Jay Obernolte	Republican	December 1, 2014 – November 30, 2020	San Bernardino	
Thurston Smith	Republican	December 7, 2020 – November 30, 2022	San Bernardino	
Devon Mathis	Republican	December 3, 2022 – November 30, 2024	Tulare	
Alexandra Macedo	Republican	December 2, 2024 – present	Tulare	

== Election results (1990–present) ==
=== 2024 ===
2024 California State Assembly 33rd district election
Primary election
Party	Candidate	Votes	%
Republican	Alexandra Macedo	22,165	44.1
Republican	Xavier Avila	11,845	23.5
Democratic	Ruben Macareno	7,640	15.2
Democratic	Angel Ruiz	6,292	12.5
Democratic	Hipolito Cerros	2,375	4.7
Total votes		50,317	100.0
General election
Republican	Alexandra Macedo	72,575	62.9
Republican	Xavier Avila	42,773	37.1
Total votes		115,348	100.0
Republican hold			

=== 2022 ===
2022 California State Assembly 33rd district election
Primary election
Party	Candidate	Votes	%
Republican	Devon Mathis (incumbent)	30,987	64.8
Democratic	Jose Sigala	9,528	19.9
Democratic	Ruben Macareno	7,272	15.2
Total votes		47,787	100.0
General election
Republican	Devon Mathis (incumbent)	52,436	62.5
Democratic	Jose Sigala	31,486	37.5
Total votes		83,922	100.0
Republican hold			

=== 2020 ===
2020 California State Assembly 33rd district election
Primary election
Party	Candidate	Votes	%
Republican	Thurston Smith	32,891	37.9
Republican	Rick Herrick	14,922	17.2
Democratic	Socorro Cisneros	12,136	14.0
Democratic	Blanca A. Gomez	8,950	10.3
Democratic	Anthony A. Rhoades	7,670	8.8
Democratic	Roger La Plante	5,655	6.5
Republican	Alex Walton	4,564	5.3
Total votes		86,788	100.0
General election
Republican	Thurston Smith	86,948	54.9
Republican	Rick Herrick	71,567	45.1
Total votes		158,515	100.0
Republican hold			

=== 2018 ===
2018 California State Assembly 33rd district election
Primary election
Party	Candidate	Votes	%
Republican	Jay Obernolte (incumbent)	43,100	65.8
Democratic	Socorro Cisneros	12,566	19.2
Democratic	Scott Markovich	9,854	15.0
Total votes		65,520	100.0
General election
Republican	Jay Obernolte (incumbent)	72,109	60.2
Democratic	Socorro Cisneros	47,603	39.8
Total votes		119,712	100.0
Republican hold			

=== 2016 ===
2016 California State Assembly 33rd district election
Primary election
Party	Candidate	Votes	%
Republican	Jay Obernolte (incumbent)	43,526	60.7
Democratic	Scott Markovich	28,220	39.3
Total votes		71,746	100.0
General election
Republican	Jay Obernolte (incumbent)	84,000	60.6
Democratic	Scott Markovich	56,086	39.4
Total votes		140,086	100.0
Republican hold			

=== 2014 ===
2014 California State Assembly 33rd district election
Primary election
Party	Candidate	Votes	%
Democratic	John Coffey	9,865	23.1
Republican	Jay Obernolte	8,028	18.8
Republican	Michelle Ambrozic	7,566	17.7
Republican	Rick Roelle	6,574	15.4
Republican	Art Bishop	5,956	14.0
Republican	Brett Savage	1,811	4.2
Republican	Scott Markovich	975	2.3
Republican	Jerry J. Laws	814	1.9
Republican	Robert J. "Bob" Burhle	802	1.9
Republican	Robert Larivee	299	0.7
Total votes		45,690	100.0
General election
Republican	Jay Obernolte	46,144	65.9
Democratic	John Coffey	23,828	34.1
Total votes		69,972	100.0
Republican hold			

=== 2012 ===
2012 California State Assembly 33rd district election
Primary election
Party	Candidate	Votes	%
Republican	Tim Donnelly (incumbent)	25,200	52.1
Democratic	John Coffey	13,873	28.7
Republican	William E. "Bill" Jahn	9,331	19.3
Total votes		48,404	100.0
General election
Republican	Tim Donnelly (incumbent)	73,836	59.0
Democratic	John Coffey	51,215	41.0
Total votes		125,051	100.0
Republican hold			

=== 2010 ===
2010 California State Assembly 33rd district election
Party	Candidate	Votes	%
Republican	Katcho Achadjian	84,629	57.8
Democratic	Hilda Zacarias	54,817	37.4
Libertarian	Paul K. Polson	7,051	4.8
Total votes		146,497	100.0
Republican hold			

=== 2008 ===
2008 California State Assembly 33rd district election
Party	Candidate	Votes	%
Republican	Sam Blakeslee (incumbent)	114,316	63.8
Democratic	Robert Cuthbert	64,740	36.2
Total votes		179,056	100.0
Republican hold			

=== 2006 ===
2006 California State Assembly 33rd district election
Party	Candidate	Votes	%
Republican	Sam Blakeslee (incumbent)	91,393	67.0
Democratic	Robert Cuthbert	44,991	33.0
Total votes		136,384	100.0
Republican hold			

=== 2004 ===
2004 California State Assembly 33rd district election
Party	Candidate	Votes	%
Republican	Sam Blakeslee	99,864	56.3
Democratic	Stew Jenkins	57,673	32.5
Green	Tom Hutchings	10,422	5.9
Libertarian	Gary L. Kirkland	9,502	5.4
Total votes		177,461	100.0
Republican hold			

=== 2002 ===
2002 California State Assembly 33rd district election
Party	Candidate	Votes	%
Republican	Abel Maldonado (incumbent)	76,590	62.7
Democratic	Laurence D. Houlgate	45,598	37.3
Total votes		122,188	100.0
Republican hold			

=== 2000 ===
2000 California State Assembly 33rd district election
Party	Candidate	Votes	%
Republican	Abel Maldonado (incumbent)	101,200	64.4
Democratic	Laurence D. Houlgate	55,855	35.6
Total votes		157,055	100.0
Republican hold			

=== 1998 ===
1998 California State Assembly 33rd district election
Party	Candidate	Votes	%
Republican	Abel Maldonado	76,596	60.3
Democratic	Betty Sanders	47,485	37.4
Libertarian	David L. Bersohn	2,868	2.3
Total votes		126,949	100.0
Republican hold			

=== 1996 ===
1996 California State Assembly 33rd district election
Party	Candidate	Votes	%
Republican	Tom J. Bordonaro, Jr. (incumbent)	84,568	58.0
Democratic	Betty Sanders	52,334	35.9
Libertarian	Gary L. Kirkland	5,268	3.6
Natural Law	Katherine R. Baker	3,753	2.6
Total votes		145,923	100.0
Republican hold			

=== 1994 ===
1994 California State Assembly 33rd district election
Party	Candidate	Votes	%
Republican	Tom J. Bordonaro, Jr.	73,767	58.4
Democratic	John B. Ashbaugh	47,842	37.8
Libertarian	Gary R. Kirkland	4,791	3.8
Total votes		126,400	100.0
Republican hold			

=== 1992 ===
1992 California State Assembly 33rd district election
Party	Candidate	Votes	%
Republican	Andrea Seastrand (incumbent)	86,090	55.6
Democratic	John B. Ashbaugh	61,712	39.8
Libertarian	Steve McClenathan	7,106	4.6
Total votes		154,908	100.0
Republican hold			

=== 1990 ===
1990 California State Assembly 33rd district election
Party	Candidate	Votes	%
Republican	Trice Harvey (incumbent)	56,113	100.0
Total votes		56,113	100.0
Republican hold			

== See also ==
- California State Assembly
- California State Assembly districts
- Districts in California
