= 2000 California elections =

- November 7, 2000
- Registered: 15,707,307
- Turnout: 70.94% (▲13.35 pp)

Elections were held in California, United States on November 7, 2000. Primary elections were held on March 7. Up for election were all the seats of the State Assembly, 20 seats of the State Senate, and eight ballot measures.

== Federal offices ==
=== United States President ===
California had 54 electoral votes in the Electoral College. Democrat Al Gore won with 53% of the vote.

=== United States Senate ===
Incumbent Democratic senator Dianne Feinstein won reelection.

=== United States House of Representatives ===
California has 52 congressional districts, electing 20 Republicans and 32 Democrats.

== California State Legislature elections ==
=== State Senate ===
There are 40 seats in the State Senate. For this election, candidates running in odd-numbered districts ran for four-year terms.

California State Senate - 2000	Seats
Democratic-Held	26
Republican-Held	14
2000 Elections
Democratic Held and Uncontested	15
Contested	20
Republican Held and Uncontested	5
Total	40

=== State Assembly ===
All 80 biennially elected seats of the State Assembly were up for election this year. Each seat has a two-year term. The Democrats retained control of the State Assembly.

California State Assembly - 2000	Seats
Democratic-Held	50
Republican-Held	30
2000 Elections
Democratic Incumbent and Uncontested	32
Republican Incumbent and Uncontested	16
Independent Incumbent and Uncontested	1
Contested, Open Seats	31
Total	80

== Statewide ballot propositions ==
Eight ballot propositions qualified to be listed on the general election ballot in California. Five measures passed while three failed.

=== Proposition 32 ===
Proposition 32 would provide for a bond of $500 million for farm and home aid for California veterans. Proposition 32 passed with 67.2% approval.

Proposition 32 results by county Yes: 70–80%; 60–70%

=== Proposition 33 ===
Proposition 33 would amend the constitution to allow members of the State Legislature to participate in the Public Employees' Retirement System plans in which a majority of state employees may participate. Proposition 33 failed with 39% approval.

Proposition 33 results by county No: 70–80%; 60–70%; 50–60%; Yes: 50–60%

=== Proposition 34 ===
Proposition 34 would limit campaign contributions and loans to state candidates and political parties, provide voluntary spending limits, expand public disclosure requirements, and increase penalties. Proposition 34 passed with 60% approval.

Proposition 34 results by county Yes: 60–70%; 50–60%

=== Proposition 35 ===
Proposition 35 would amend the constitution to eliminate existing restrictions on state and local contracting with private entities for engineering and architectural services. Contracts would be awarded by competitive selection, and bidding would be allowed, but not required. Proposition 35 passed with 55.1% approval.

Proposition 35 results by county Yes: 60–70%; 50–60%; No: 50–60%

=== Proposition 36 ===
Proposition 36 would require probation and drug treatment, not incarceration, for possession, use, transportation of controlled substances and similar parole violations, except sale or manufacture; and would authorize dismissal of charges after completion of treatment. Proposition 36 passed with 60.8% approval.

Proposition 36 results by county Yes: 70–80%; 60–70%; 50–60%; No: 50–60%

=== Proposition 37 ===
Proposition 37 would amend the constitution to require a two-thirds vote of the State Legislature and a majority or two-thirds of the local electorate to impose future state and local fees on activity to study or mitigate its environmental, societal or economic effects. Proposition 37 failed with 48% approval.

Proposition 37 results by county No: 70–80%; 60–70%; 50–60%; Yes: 60–70%; 50–60%

=== Proposition 38 ===
Proposition 38 would amend the constitution to authorize annual state payments of at least $4000 per pupil for private/religious schools, and allow replacement of current constitutional public school funding formula. Proposition 38 failed with 29.5% approval.

Proposition 38 results by county No: 70–80%; 60–70%

=== Proposition 39 ===
Proposition 39 would authorize bonds for repair, construction or replacement of school facilities and classrooms, if approved by 55% of the local vote. Proposition 39 passed with 53.3% approval.

Proposition 39 results by county Yes: 60–70%; 50–60%; No: 60–70%; 50–60%

== See also ==
- California State Legislature
- California State Assembly
- California State Assembly elections, 2000
- California State Senate
- California State Senate elections, 2000
- Districts in California
- Political party strength in U.S. states
- Political party strength in California
- Elections in California
