= Thurston Smith =

American businessman and politician

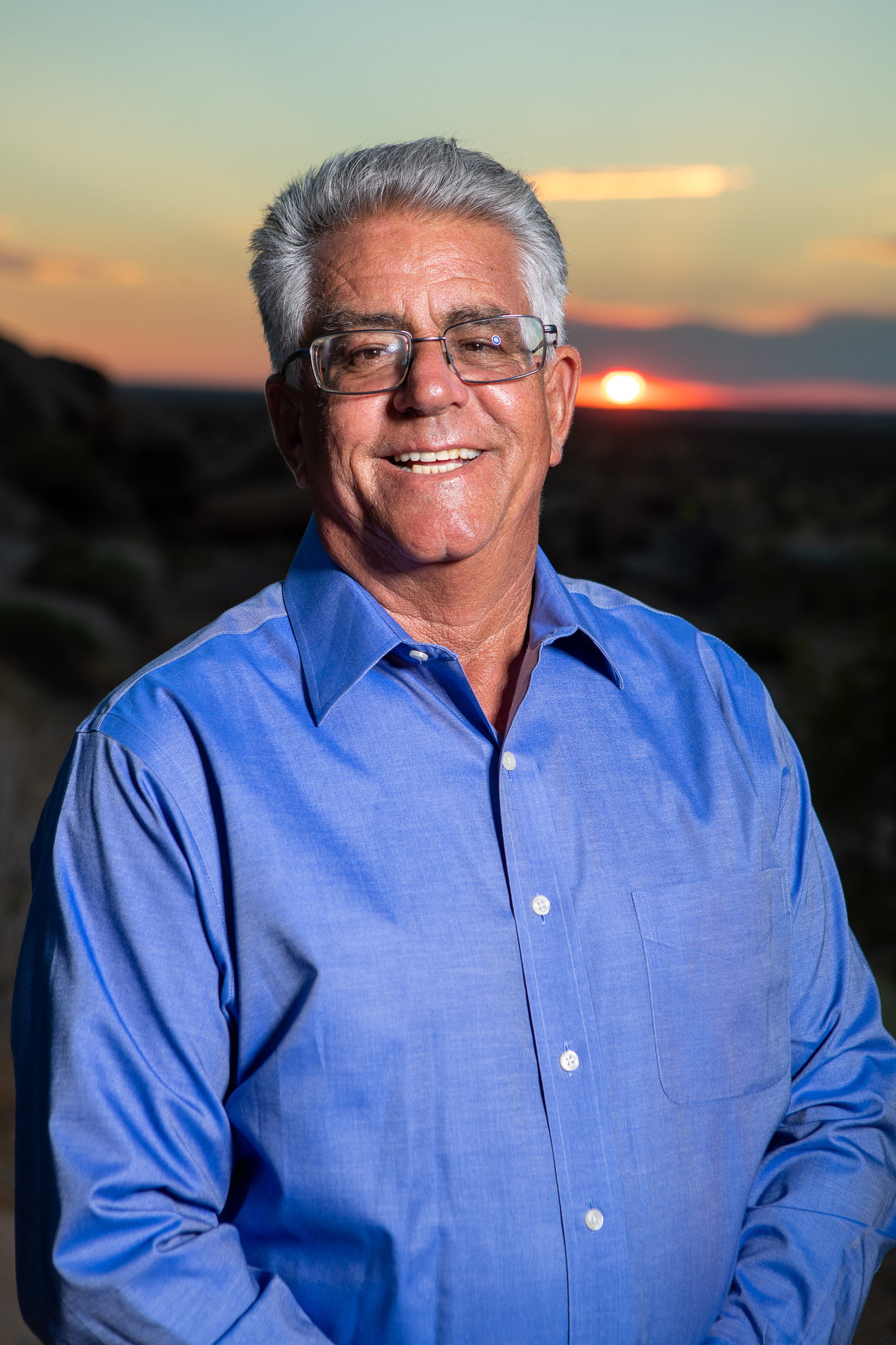

Member of the California State Assembly from the 33rd district
- In office December 7, 2020 – December 3, 2022
- Preceded by: Jay Obernolte
- Succeeded by: Tom Lackey (redistricting)

Personal details
- Born: March 9, 1958 (age 68) Hesperia, California, U.S.
- Party: Republican
- Spouse: Margaret (m. 1986)
- Children: 2

Thurston "Smitty" Smith (born March 9, 1958) is an American businessman and politician who is a member of the California State Assembly from the 33rd district. He assumed office on December 7, 2020, succeeding Jay Obernolte. He left office on December 3, 2022, after losing re-election to another Republican incumbent, Tom Lackey.

== Early life and education ==
Smith was born in Hesperia, and took classes at Victor Valley College.

== Career ==
Prior to his election to the Assembly, Smith owned a concrete company. He served on the Hesperia City Council from 2006 to 2014 and on the Mohave Valley Water Agency from 2016 to 2018. After Jay Obernolte declined to seek re-election to the Assembly and instead run for California's 8th congressional district, Smith announced his candidacy to succeed him. Smith placed first in the nonpartisan blanket primary and defeated fellow Republican Rick Herrick, the Mayor of Big Bear Lake, in the November general election. In the 2022 2022 California State Assembly election for District 34, Smith lost re-election to fellow Republican incumbent Tom Lackey.

Lackey is term limited and ineligible to run for reelection. Smith is running to return to the California state Assembly in 2026.

== Personal life ==
Smith lives in Apple Valley, California with his wife Margaret.

== Election results ==
=== 2020 ===
California State Assembly election, 2020
Primary election
Party	Candidate	Votes	%
Republican	Thurston "Smitty" Smith	32,891	37.9%
Republican	Rick Herrick	14,922	17.2%
Democratic	Socorro Cisneros	12,136	14.0%
Democratic	Blanca A. Gomez	8,950	10.3%
Democratic	Anthony A. Rhoades	7,670	8.8%
Democratic	Roger La Plante	5,655	6.5%
Republican	Alex Walton	4,564	5.3%
Total votes		86,788	100.0%
General election
Republican	Thurston “Smitty” Smith	86,948	54.9%
Republican	Rick Herrick	71,567	45.1%
Total votes		158,515	100.0%
Republican hold			
