= Tom J. Bordonaro Jr. =

American politician (born 1959)

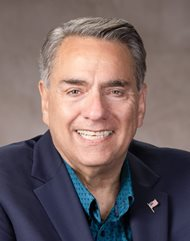

San Luis Obispo County Assessor
- Incumbent
- Assumed office 2002
- Preceded by: Dick Frank

Member of the California State Assembly from the 33rd district
- In office December 5, 1994 – November 30, 1998
- Preceded by: Andrea Seastrand
- Succeeded by: Abel Maldonado

Personal details
- Born: March 22, 1959 (age 67) Fullerton, California
- Party: Republican
- Spouse: Martha (m. 1990)
- Children: 4
- Education: California Polytechnic State University, San Luis Obispo (BS); University of California, Davis (MS)

Tom J. Bordonaro Jr. (born March 22, 1959) is an American politician serving as the Assessor of San Luis Obispo County, California, since 2002. A Republican, he served two terms in the California State Assembly from 1994 to 1998, making him the first wheelchair-user to be elected to the legislative body.

== Early life and education ==
Born in Fullerton, California, his father's family is from Italy and his mother's family came to California from East Texas during the Dust Bowl. Bordonaro graduated from California Polytechnic State University, San Luis Obispo with a bachelor's degree in agricultural management and a master's degree in agricultural economics from the University of California, Davis.

In his first year of college, Bordonaro was left a quadriplegic after breaking his neck in a car crash.

== Career ==
Bordonaro was elected to the California State Assembly in 1994 representing the 33rd district, representing parts of the lower Central Coast. He was the first wheelchair-user elected to the legislative body.

Bordonaro ran in the 1998 special election replacing Walter Capps, who died of a heart attack after taking office. Considered the more conservative candidate, he won the Republican nomination over Newt Gingrich-endorsed Assemblyman Brooks Firestone. Gerald Ford had previously described Bordonaro as an "extremist" for his stance on abortion and Democratic nominee Lois Capps used the quote in media attacks against him. Capps, Walter's widow, ultimately won with 53.46% to Bordonaro's 44.78% of the total vote. He ran in the regularly scheduled general election and lost again.

He was elected San Luis Obispo County Assessor in 2002, defeating 25-year incumbent Dick Frank, and has been unnoposed in every election besides 2018.

== Electoral history ==
=== 1998 (special) ===
List of special elections to the United States House of Representatives in California
Party	Candidate	Votes	%
Democratic	Lois Capps	93,392	53.46%
Republican	Tom J. Bordonaro, Jr.	78,224	44.78%
Libertarian	Robert Bakhaus	3,079	1.76%
Total votes		174,695	100%
Turnout			
Democratic hold			

=== 1998 ===
1998 United States House of Representatives elections
Party	Candidate	Votes	%
Democratic	Lois Capps (incumbent)	111,388	55.09%
Republican	Tom J. Bordonaro Jr.	86,921	42.99%
Libertarian	Robert Bakhaus	2,618	1.29%
Reform	Richard D. "Dick" Porter	1,263	0.62%
Total votes		202,190	100%
Turnout			
Democratic hold			

== Personal life ==
Bordonaro and his wife, Martha, live on a farm in Paso Robles. The couple have four children and two grandchildren.

Political offices
Preceded by Andrea Seastrand	California State Assemblyman, 33rd District; December 5, 1994 – November 30, 1998	Succeeded by Abel Maldonado
