= Big Five (California politics) =

Informal political institution

The Big Five is an informal institution of California state government, consisting of the governor, the Assembly speaker, the Assembly minority leader, the Senate president pro tempore, and the Senate minority leader. Historically, members of the Big Five met in private to negotiate California's state government budget. These meetings were held under governors George Deukmejian, Pete Wilson, Gray Davis, and Arnold Schwarzenegger.

In 2010, California voters passed Proposition 25, which reduced the threshold to pass a budget from a 2/3 supermajority to a simple majority. As a result, the votes of legislators from the minority party were no longer needed for the legislature to pass a budget, reducing the impact of the minority leaders on budget negotiations. However, a 2/3 supermajority was still required if the budget contained tax increases.

== Current members ==
- Governor: Gavin Newsom (Democrat)
- Assembly Speaker: Robert Rivas (Democrat)
- Assembly Minority Leader: James Gallagher (Republican)
- Senate President pro tempore: Mike McGuire (Democrat)
- Senate Minority Leader: Brian Jones (Republican)

== GOP 5 ==
During budget talks in 2011, five Republican state senators broke with their party and were willing to negotiate with Governor Jerry Brown about placing propositions on the ballot to extend tax increases. The five senators, known as the "GOP 5" as a tribute to the "big 5", were Tom Berryhill, Sam Blakeslee, Anthony Cannella, Bill Emmerson, and Tom Harman.
