= Laurence Houlgate =

American philosopher (born 1938)

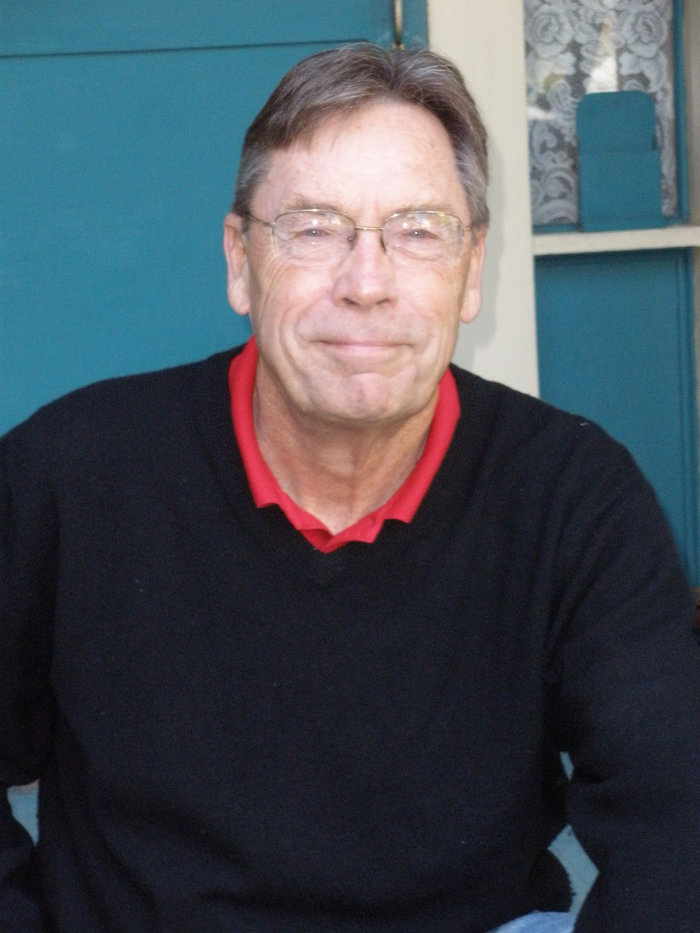
- Houlgate in 2015
- Born: Laurence D. Houlgate; 1938 (age 87–88); Pasadena, California, U.S.
- Spouse: Torre Houlgate-West
- Awards: Faculty Scholar of the Year, California Polytechnic State University

Education
- Education: California State University, Los Angeles (B.A.), University of California, Los Angeles (Ph.D.)
- Thesis: Knowledge, Action and Responsibility (1967)
- Doctoral advisor: Herbert Morris
- Other advisor: H. L. A. Hart

Philosophical work
- Era: Contemporary philosophy
- Region: Western philosophy
- School: Analytic philosophy
- Institutions: California Polytechnic State University
- Main interests: Political philosophy, ethical theory, philosophy of law

Laurence D. Houlgate (born 1938) is an American philosopher, emeritus professor of philosophy and former department chair at California Polytechnic State University. He specializes in the history of Western philosophy, philosophy of the family, philosophy of law, and political philosophy. Houlgate was one of the first philosophers in the 20th century to theorize about the moral foundations of children's rights and the ethics of family relationships. After his retirement, Professor Houlgate wrote a popular series of eight study guides on the classical philosophers for beginning philosophy students. Houlgate also stood as the Democratic Party candidate for his district in the California State Assembly election of 2000 and California State Assembly election, 2002.

== Career ==
Laurence Houlgate did his undergraduate work in philosophy at California State University, Los Angeles (CSULA). After the degree in philosophy was approved by the administration in 1960, Houlgate was the first student to graduate from CSULA with a B.A. in Philosophy. His mentor was Henry Alexander. On his recommendation, Laurence enrolled as a graduate student at the University of California, Berkeley. He later transferred to the University of California, Los Angeles, to study under H. L. A. Hart (Visiting Professor) and Herbert Morris, one of Hart's students at Oxford University and a recent appointee at UCLA. Houlgate received his M.A. and Ph.D. degrees in Philosophy from UCLA in 1965 and 1967, having written his dissertation under Morris's direction.

Houlgate's first full-time appointment was lecturer in philosophy at California State University, Fullerton. After two years, he accepted a position at the University of California, Santa Barbara (1966). He accepted a visiting professorship for one year at Reed College, Oregon (1972–1973), and later accepted an Associate Professor position at George Mason University – GMU, Virginia. He remained at GMU for six years (1973–1979) and in 1979, accepted a position at California Polytechnic State University, San Luis Obispo, where he was appointed Professor of Philosophy (1980) and served as department chair from 1990 to 1995. He retired from full-time teaching at Cal Poly in 2002 but continued part-time teaching until 2016.

Professor Houlgate's first published works were in the area of philosophy of law. He wrote his Ph.D. dissertation on the general topic of excuses in criminal law, with a special emphasis on the excuses of mistake and ignorance of fact. He later published several articles in philosophical journals based on chapters in the dissertation.

In the next stage of his career, Houlgate spent one academic year as a fellow at the University of Virginia School of Law. He did research on the legal rights of children and later published one of the first philosophical books on this topic (The Child and the State). In subsequent years, he turned to the study of the philosophical foundations of family law and the ethics of family relationships. This research led to a monograph on the philosophy of family law (Family and State), a reader on family ethics (Morals, Marriage and Parenthood), and a collection of his previously published articles (Children's Rights, State Intervention, Custody And Divorce: Contradictions in Ethics And Family Law).

In his post-retirement years, Houlgate twice ran for and won election as the Democratic Party candidate for the California State Assembly. He later lost the general election to the incumbent twice, as had every Democratic candidate in his district during the previous 50 years.

In 2016, Professor Houlgate decided to keep a promise to his former students to write a series of study guides on the classical philosophers. There are now eight of these guides, published as a series titled The Smart Student's Guides to Philosophical Classics. He also kept a promise to his colleagues who teach courses in the philosophy of law to write a textbook based exclusively on family law cases. That book was published in 2016 under the title Philosophy, Law and Family: A New Introduction to the Philosophy of Law. The book is published by Springer Nature International.

== Publications ==
=== Books ===
- Understanding Philosophy, 3rd edition: The Smart Student's Guide to Reading and Writing Philosophy, 2022.
- Understanding Jean-Jacques Rouseau: The Smart Student's Guide to The Social Contract (Smart Student's Guides to Philosophical Classics, Book 8), 2021.
- Understanding Plato: The Smart Student's Guide to the Socratic Dialogues and The Republic (Smart Student's Guides to Philosophical Classics, Book 1)2016.
- Understanding John Locke: The Smart Student's Guide to Locke's Second Treatise of Government (Smart Student's Guides to Philosophical Classics, Book 2) 2016.
- Understanding John Stuart Mill: The Smart Student's Guide to Utilitarianism and On Liberty (Smart Student's Guides to Philosophical Classics, Book 3)
- Understanding Immanuel Kant: The Smart Student's Guide to Grounding for the Metaphysics of Morals (Smart Student's Guides to Philosophical Classics, Book 4).
- Understanding David Hume: The Smart Student's Guide to Dialogues Concerning Natural Religion and the essays Of Miracles, Of Immortality of the Soul, and Of Suicide (Smart Student's Guides to Philosophical Classics, Book 5)
- Understanding Thomas Hobbes: The Smart Student's Guide to Leviathan (Smart Student's Guides to Philosophical Classics, Book 6)
- Morals, Marriage, and Parenthood: An Introduction to Family Ethics
- Philosophy, Law and the Family: A New Introduction to the Philosophy of Law (AMINTAPHIL: The Philosophical Foundations of Law and Justice)
- The Child and the State: A Normative Theory of Juvenile Rights
- Family and State: The Philosophy of Family Law
- Children's Rights, State Intervention, Custody And Divorce: Contradictions in Ethics And Family Law (Problems in Contemporary Philosophy)

=== Other media ===
- Podcasts. Understanding Plato. (Spreaker, 2021); Understanding John Locke (Spreaker, 2022)
- Audiobook. The Family, an audiobook in the series Morality in our Age: the Audio Classics Series (Knoxville: Knowledge Products, 1995). Script by Professor Laurence Houlgate. Narration by the actor Cliff Robertson. Two cassettes, total playing time 2 1/2–3 hours.
