= 2000 California Proposition 39 =

Proposition 39 was an initiative state constitutional amendment and statute which appeared on the November 7, 2000, California general election ballot. Proposition 39 passed with 5,431,152 Yes votes, representing 53.4 percent of the total votes cast. Proposition 39 was essentially a milder version of Proposition 26, which would have ended the Proposition 13 supermajority vote requirement altogether (imposing a simple majority vote requirement), but was defeated with 3,521,327 "Yes" votes, representing 48.7 percent of the total votes cast, in the March 7, 2000, California primary election. The measure was funded by Ann and John Doerr, John T. Walton and Reed Hastings; it was opposed by the Howard Jarvis Taxpayers Association.

== Results ==
Proposition 39 results by county Yes: 60–70%; 50–60%; No: 60–70%; 50–60%

== Main Effect ==
The main effect of Proposition 39 was to amend Proposition 13 by lowering the required supermajority vote necessary for voters to approve local school bonds, from two-thirds (2/3) of the votes cast, to fifty-five percent (55%) of the votes cast.

=== Property Tax Increase to Repay Bonds ===
Voter approved school bonds under Proposition 39 are paid off by raising property taxes above the one percent (1%) property tax rate limit established by Proposition 13 in 1978.

=== Constitutional Debt Provision ===
Proposition 39 also lowered, as it relates to school bonds, the local voter approval requirement to incur debt from a two-thirds (2/3) vote to fifty-five percent (55%). The two-thirds vote requirement to incur debt is separate from the property tax limits of Proposition 13, and had previously been part of the California Constitution since 1879.

=== Charter School Facilities ===
Proposition 39 further included statutory provisions relating to charter school facilities.
