= 2010 California lieutenant gubernatorial election =

- November 2, 2010
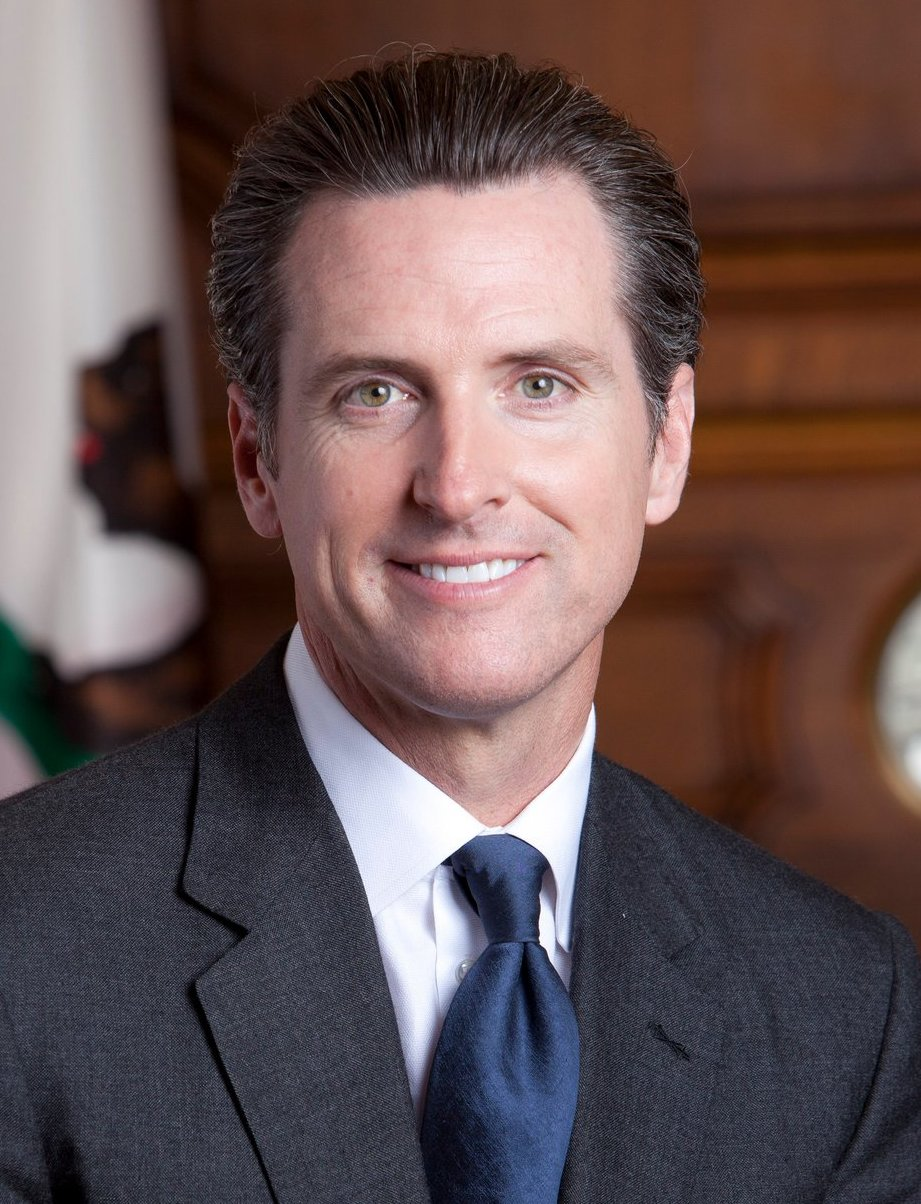

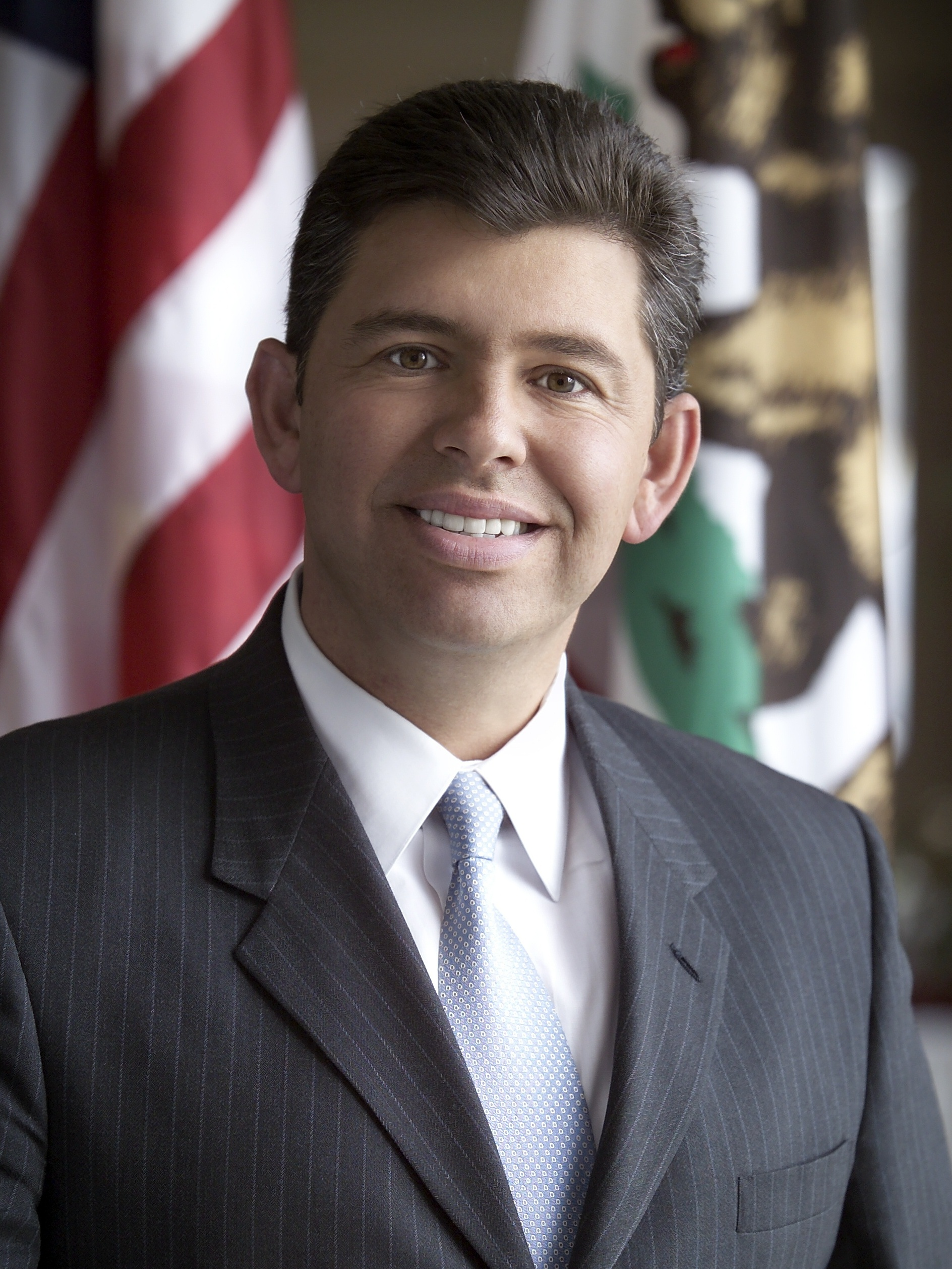

Nominee	Gavin Newsom	Abel Maldonado	Pamela Brown
Party	Democratic	Republican	Libertarian
Popular vote	4,917,880	3,820,971	574,636
Percentage	50.12%	38.94%	5.85%
- County results Newsom: 40–50% 50–60% 60–70% 70–80% Maldonado: 40–50% 50–60% 60–70%
Lieutenant Governor before election
Abel Maldonado
Republican
Elected Lieutenant Governor
Gavin Newsom
Democratic

The 2010 California lieutenant gubernatorial election was held on November 2, 2010, to elect the lieutenant governor of California. The primary election took place on June 8, 2010. Incumbent Republican lieutenant governor Abel Maldonado, who had been appointed to the office, ran for election to a full term but was defeated by Democratic Mayor Gavin Newsom of San Francisco. Newsom started his four-year term on January 10, 2011.

== Democratic Primary ==
=== Candidates ===
- Janice Hahn, member of the Los Angeles City Council
- Eric Korevaar, businessman and scientist
- Gavin Newsom, Mayor of San Francisco

=== Polls ===
Poll source	Dates administered	Gavin Newsom	Dean Florez	Janice Hahn	Alan Lowenthal	Undecided
Fairbank, Maslin, Maullin and Associates	October 3–7, 2009	—	8%	24%	7%	61%
Tulchin Research	January 2010	33%	15%	17%	—	35%

=== Results ===
California Democratic lieutenant governor primary, 2010
Candidate	Votes	%
Gavin Newsom	1,308,860	55.5
Janice Hahn	780,115	33.3
Eric Korevaar	257,349	10.9
Total votes	2,346,324	100.00
Turnout	7,553,109	31.0%

== Republican Primary ==
=== Candidates ===
- Sam Aanestad, state senator representing the 4th district
- Bert Davis, businessman
- Yvonne Girard, judicial assistant
- Dave Harris, businessman
- Scott Levitt, attorney
- Abel Maldonado, incumbent lieutenant governor

=== Results ===
California Republican lieutenant governor primary, 2010
Candidate	Votes	%
Abel Maldonado (incumbent)	939,370	43.6
Sam Aanestad	668,345	31.0
Dave Harris	180,960	8.4
Bert Davis	130,486	6.1
Scott Levitt	126,023	5.8
Yvonne Girard	111,554	5.1
Total votes	2,156,738	100.00
Turnout	5,228,320	41.3%

== Other Primaries ==
California lieutenant governor primary, 2010 (others)
Party	Candidate	Votes	%
American Independent	Jim King	38,638	100
Green	James Castillo	19,462	100
Libertarian	Pamela Brown	18,276	100
Peace and Freedom	C. T. Weber	3,813	100

== General election ==
=== Opinion polls ===
Poll source	Dates administered	Abel Maldonado (R)	Gavin Newsom (D)	Undecided/other
Times/USC	October 13–20, 2010	37%	41%	5%
SurveyUSA	October 15–18, 2010	37%	43%	6%
The Field Poll	September 25, 2010	35%	39%	26%
Survey USA	September 19–21, 2010	41%	44%	11%
Public Policy Polling	September 14–16, 2010	36%	39%	24%
Survey USA	August 31-September 1, 2010	39%	44%	15%
Survey USA	August 8–11, 2010	42%	43%	15%
The Field Poll	June 22–25, 2010	34%	43%	23%

=== Results ===
California lieutenant governor election, 2010
Party	Candidate	Votes	%	±%
Democratic	Gavin Newsom	4,917,880	50.12%	+1.00%
Republican	Abel Maldonado (incumbent)	3,820,971	38.94%	−6.15%
Libertarian	Pamela Brown	574,636	5.85%	+4.18%
American Independent	Jim King	184,901	1.88%	+1.08%
Green	James Castillo	163,982	1.67%	−1.13%
Peace and Freedom	C. T. Weber	116,346	1.19%	+0.68%
Independent	Karen England (write-in)	34,119	0.35%	N/A
Total votes		9,812,835	100.00%	N/A
Democratic gain from Republican				
