= Sam Blakeslee =

American politician (born 1955)

Member of the California State Senate from the 15th district
- In office August 23, 2010 – December 3, 2012
- Preceded by: Abel Maldonado
- Succeeded by: Jim Beall (redistricted)

Minority Leader of the California Assembly
- In office June 1, 2009 – February 1, 2010
- Preceded by: Michael Villines
- Succeeded by: Martin Garrick

Member of the California State Assembly from the 33rd district
- In office December 6, 2004 – August 23, 2010
- Preceded by: Abel Maldonado
- Succeeded by: Katcho Achadjian

Personal details
- Born: Samuel Blakeslee; June 25, 1955 (age 71) San Bernardino, California, U.S.
- Party: Republican
- Spouse: None
- Children: 2
- Education: University of California, Berkeley; University of California, Santa Barbara
- Profession: Financial Planner; Research Scientist, Exxon
- Website: Cal Poly IATPP Site

Samuel Blakeslee (born June 25, 1955) is a former Republican California State Senator representing California's 15th State Senate district which included the counties of Santa Clara, Monterey, San Luis Obispo, Santa Cruz and Santa Barbara. He previously served as a California State Assemblyman from California's 33rd State Assembly district, and a former State Assembly Republican Leader. He was elected to the California State Assembly in 2004 to represent the 33rd Assembly District, He was re-elected in 2006 and 2008, and elected to the California State Senate in 2010. Blakeslee retired from the Senate in December 2012. He is the founding Director of the Institute for Advanced Technology & Public Policy at California Polytechnic State University, San Luis Obispo.

== Early life and education ==
Blakeslee grew up on the Central Coast. He graduated from San Luis Obispo High School and then began a career in construction. Years later, he returned to school and attended Cuesta College, where his father, Earle Blakeslee, taught music when the college opened in 1965. He later earned both bachelor's and master's degrees in geophysics from University of California, Berkeley. In 1989, Blakeslee earned a Ph.D. from University of California, Santa Barbara for his research in seismic scattering, micro-earthquake studies, and fault-zone attenuation. He is published in numerous scientific journals.

== Early career ==
Blakeslee worked as a research geophysicist at Exxon's research lab in Texas in the Long Range Research Division. He received a patent for inventing an innovative technique that used medical cat-scan technology to create detailed images of geologic formations between wellbores. He later on moved into management and served as a strategic planner for the upstream research function at the lab.

== Political career ==
=== Senator and Assemblyman ===
Blakeslee was elected to the California State Assembly in 2004 and later to the State Senate. Elected by his fellow legislators, Blakeslee served a term as Assembly Minority Leader. In this role, he was a member of the "Big 5" with responsibility for negotiating the state budget and major policy initiatives. He also served and held leadership positions on a variety of legislative committees focusing on agriculture, energy, banking, environmental quality, education, and other fields. He successfully authored dozens of bills to evolve and reform policy related to energy, the environment, health care, job creation, lobbying reform, public and worker safety, veterans' affairs, and other areas of concern.

==== E3: Task Force on Energy, Environment and the Economy ====
While serving in Sacramento, Blakeslee founded and chaired the Task Force on Energy, the Environment, and the Economy known as 'E3'. The group developed strategies to bridge the divide between the environment and the economy by applying emerging technologies. Since its creation in 2008, E3 members have worked closely with industry leaders and the environmental community to craft legislative proposals across party lines and voted in support of key legislation that promoted cleantech, helped prevent oil spills, established incentives for reduced mobile source emissions, and promoted green chemistry. The average E3 member scored 15 points higher on the California League of Conservation Voters (CLCV) scorecard than their non-E3 counterpart in the Assembly Republican caucus, and 18 points higher than their prior year's score.

==== Committee Membership ====
- Vice Chair, Assembly Utilities and Commerce Committee
- Vice Chair, Assembly Rules Committee
- Member, Assembly Insurance Committee
- Member, Assembly Government Organization Committee
- Member, Assembly Budget Committee
- Member, Assembly Agriculture Committee
- Member, Assembly Public Employee Retirement and Social Security
- Chair, Senate Select Committee on Reform, Recovery and Realignment
- Vice Chair, Senate Banking Committee
- Member, Senate Judiciary Committee
- Member, Senate Environmental Quality Committee
- Member, Senate Education Committee
- Member, Senate Select Committee on Seismic Safety
- Member, Joint Select Committee on State Hospital Safety.

== Post-political career ==
Blakeslee serves as the President of two financial firms - Broker/Dealer Blakeslee & Blakeslee and the Registered Investment Advisor Blakeslee & Blakeslee Financial Advisers. The multi-branch firms have offices in San Luis Obispo and Santa Barbara Counties managing over $750 million of assets. He is a Certified Financial Planner, General Municipal Securities Principal (Series 53), General Securities Principal (Series 24), and a General Securities Representative (Series 7). Home | Blakeslee & Blakeslee Financial Advisers

=== Institute for Advanced Technology and Public Policy (IATPP) ===
Blakeslee founded IATPP in 2012 with a mission to "develop and promote practical solutions to real-world problems by informing and driving public policy through advanced technology". The institute has several research projects in the areas of digital democracy, algorithmic journalism and Anti-bot influence operations. The Digital Democracy project was a 2017 finalist for the "Innovations in American Government" award presented by the Ash Center for Democratic Governance and Innovation. As of 2021, the institute organization page lists Christine Robinson as a senior advisor and Foaad Khosmood as a research director.

=== Community involvement ===
Before his election to the state Legislature, Blakeslee served as a two-term Trustee for Cuesta Community College. He was first elected in 1998.

In 1999, Assemblyman Blakeslee authored the successful DREAM Initiative. Passing by 75%, the DREAM Initiative was a countywide advisory ballot measure that sought to create a long-term vision for the future of PG&E's 12-mile scenic coastline known as the Diablo Canyon Lands.

In 2016 Sam Blakeslee, along with Charles Munger Jr., was co-author and co-proponent of Proposition 54, which was adopted by the electorate by an almost 2:1 margin. The Constitutional Amendment created a 72-hour in-print rule for all state legislation before adoption with other transparency requirements. California Proposition 54, Public Display of Legislative Bills Prior to Vote (2016)

In 2017 Sam Blakeslee became a board member of California Common Cause. He became Vice Chair of the board in 2020. State Advisory Board

In 2018 Sam Blakeslee became the Founding President of the San Luis Coastal Education Foundation, a nonprofit working to increase funding for innovation in education at the San Luis Coastal Unified School District. Over the next five years, the Foundation will receive $10M in funding from SB1090, which utilizes rate-payer funds to mitigate the closure of the Diablo Canyon Nuclear Power Plant. About Us

In August 2021, in response "to rising concerns about San Luis Obispo County’s unhoused population," Sam Blakeslee and attorney Greg Gillet launched San Luis Obispo County Citizens Commission on Homelessness. The commission's goal is to recommend solutions seeking "accountability and results". On December 2, 2021, the Blakeslee and Gillet delivered a first set of recommendations, including a proposal for a new Joint Powers Authority to coordinate the regional response to homelessness.

California Senate
Preceded by Abel Maldonado	California State Senator; 15th District; August 23, 2010 – December 3, 2012	Succeeded by Jim Beall
California Assembly
Preceded by Abel Maldonado	California State Assemblyman; 33rd District; December 6, 2004 – August 23, 2010	Succeeded by Katcho Achadjian
Party political offices
Preceded by Michael Villines	Minority Leader of the California State Assembly; June 1, 2009–February 1, 2010	Succeeded by Martin Garrick
