= Herbert Morris (philosopher) =

American art historian (1928–2022)

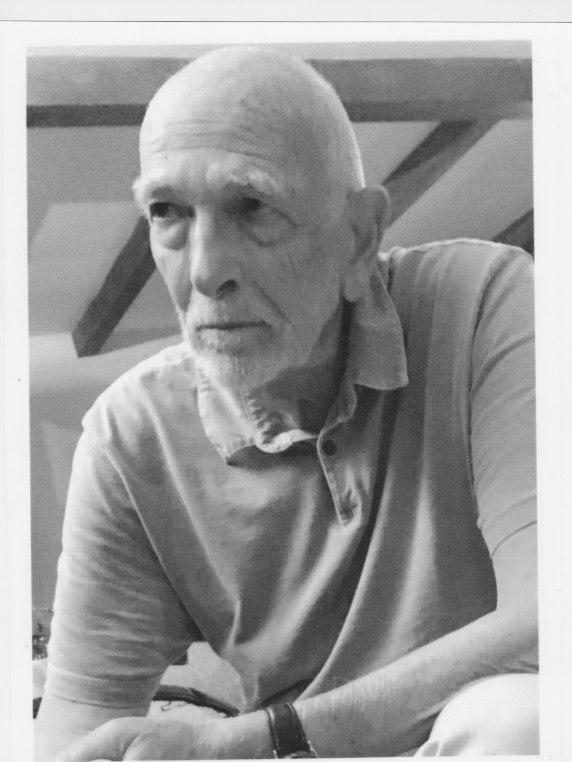
Herbert Morris

Herbert Morris (1928 – December 14, 2022) was an American philosopher, legal scholar, and literary critic, who spent his career at the University of California, Los Angeles.

== Education and career ==
Herbert Morris was born in New York City in 1928. He received his Bachelor of Arts degree at the University of California, Los Angeles (UCLA) 1951; Bachelor of Law, Yale, 1954; Doctor of Philosophy, Oxford University, 1956. He joined the UCLA Philosophy Department in 1956 and beginning in 1962 he accepted a joint appointment with the UCLA School of Law.

Morris served as Dean of Humanities of UCLA's College of Letters and Science from 1983 to 1993, and Interim Provost of the College from 1992 to 1993. He chaired the Board of Governors of the University's Humanities Research Institute from 1988 to 1990.

After retirement, Morris continued to teach a popular lecture course at UCLA on "Law, Philosophy and Literature". He also continued to write. His latest article "On the Soul" appeared in the journal Philosophy in 2019.

Morris died at his home in Los Angeles on December 14, 2022, at the age of 94.

== Philosophical work ==
Professor Morris lectured and wrote widely on moral and legal philosophy and is best known for his ground-breaking book On Guilt and Innocence: Essays in Legal Philosophy and Moral Psychology (University of California Press, 1976). His most influential paper is "Persons and Punishment," first published in Monist (1968). He is also the author of several works of literary criticism. See below for a complete bibliography.

== Publications ==
=== Books ===
- Disclosures: Essays on Art, Literature and Philosophy, Amazon, 2017.
- Artists in Evil, Amazon, 2009.
- On Guilt and Innocence: Essays in Legal Philosophy and Moral Psychology, University of California Press, 1976
- The Masked Citadel: The Significance of the Title of Stendhal's La Chartreuse de Parme, University of California Press, 1961

=== Edited books ===
- On Guilt and Shame, Wadsworth Publishing Company, 1971
- Freedom and Responsibility: Readings in Philosophy and Law, Stanford University Press, 1961

=== Articles ===
- On the Soul, 94 Philosophy 221-42 (2019).
- The Absent and Present Serpent in Nicolas Poussin's SPRING, XVI(1) Cahiers de dix-septieme siecle, 17 63-76 (2015).
- Murphy on Forgiveness, 7 Criminal Justice Ethics 15-19 (1988).
- George Fletcher and Collective Guilt: A Critical Commentary on the 2001 Storrs Lectures, 78 Notre Dame Law Review 731-50 (2003).
- Sex, Shame, and Assorted Other Topics, 22 Quinnipiac University Law Review 123-43 (2003).
- Some Further Reflections on Guilt and Punishment, 18 Law & Philosophy 363-78 (1999).
- The Future of Punishment, 46 UCLA Law Review 1927-31 (1999).
- What Emma Knew: The Outrage Suffered in Jorge Luis Borges's Emma Zunz, 10-11 Indiana Journal of Hispanic Literatures 165-202 (1997).
- Professor Murphy on Liberalism and Retributivism, 37 Arizona Law Review 95-104 (1995). Symposium: Issues in the Philosophy of Law.
- The Decline of Guilt, 99 Ethics 62-76 (1988).
- Nonmoral Guilt, in Responsibility, Character and the Emotions: New Essays in Moral Psychology 220-40 (edited by Ferdinand D. Schoeman, Cambridge University Press, 1987).
- Legal Guilt, in Encyclopedia of Crime and Justice 820-24 (edited by Sanford H. Kadish, Free Press, 1983).
- A Paternalistic Theory of Punishment, 18 American Philosophical Quarterly 263-71 (1981). Reprinted in Paternalism 139-52 (edited by Rolf Sartorius, University of Minnesota Press, 1983).
- Reflections on Feeling Guilty, 40 Philosophical Studies 187-93 (1981).
- The Status of Rights, 92 Ethics 40-51 (1981).
- Discussion: Addiction and Criminal Responsibility (with James Coleman and Thomas Scheff), 9 Center Magazine 46-58 (1976).
- Criminal Insanity, 17 Inquiry 345-55 (1974).
- Shared Guilt, in Wisdom: Twelve Essays 249-73 (edited by Renford Bambrough, Rowman & Littlefield, 1974).
- The Nature of Legal Responsibility, in Dictionary of the History of Ideas 33-36 (edited by Philip Paul Weiner, Scribner, 1973).
- Guilt and Suffering, 21 Philosophy East & West 419-34 (1971).
- Guilt and Punishment, 52 Personalist 305-21 (1971).
- Persons and Punishment, 52 Monist 475-501 (1968).
- John Austin, (edited by Paul Edwards). Encyclopedia of Philosophy Macmillan 209-11 (1967).
- Punishment for Thoughts, 49 Monist 342-76 (1965).
- Dean Pound's Jurisprudence, 13 Stanford Law Review 185-210 (1960).
- Imperatives and Orders, XXVI Theoria 183-209 (1960). Reprinted as Imperatives and Orders. Goeteborg (1960).
- Verbal Disputes and the Legal Philosophy of John Austin, 7 UCLA Law Review 27-56 (1960).
