= Abel Maldonado =

48th Lieutenant Governor of California (born 1967)

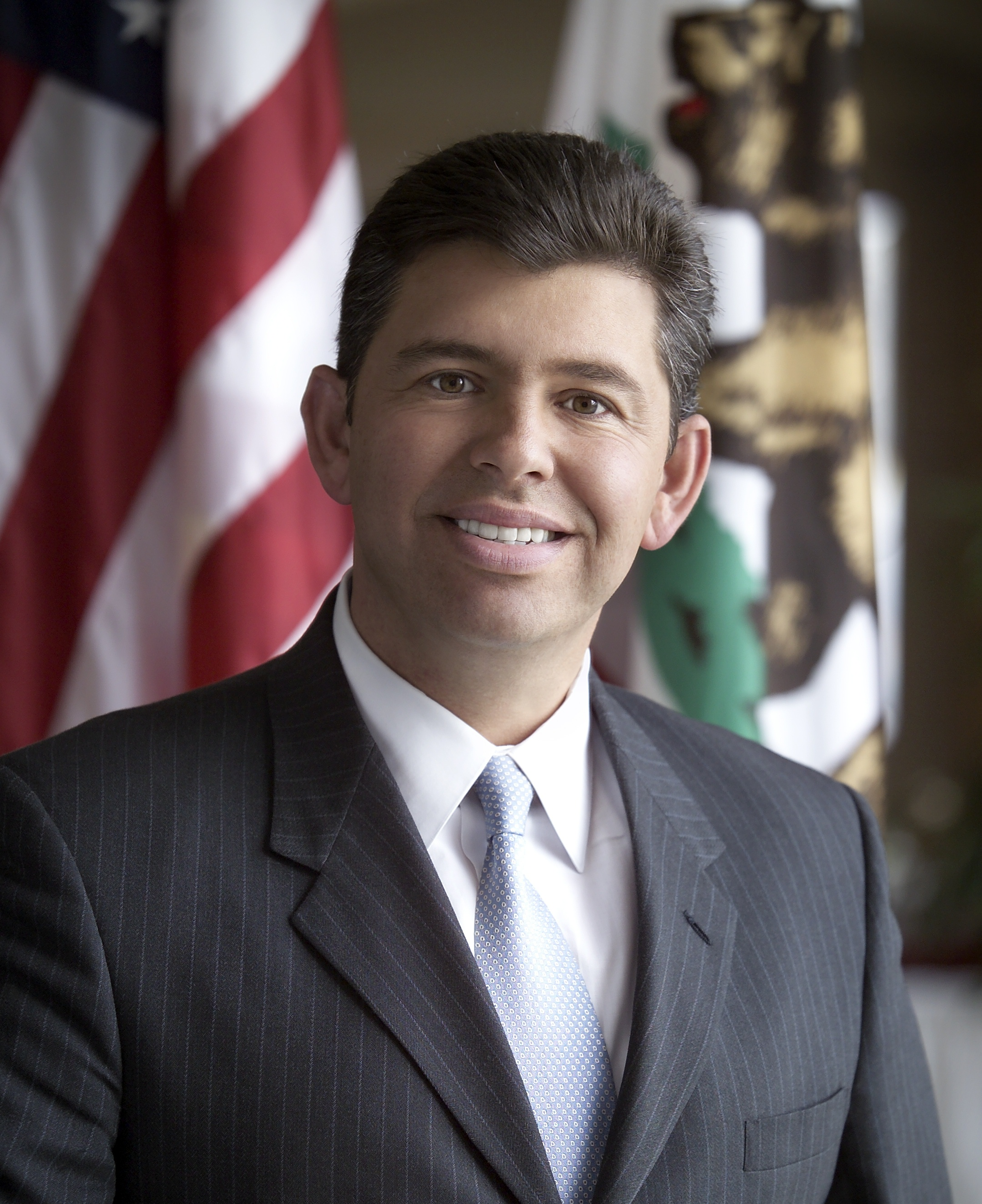
- Official portrait, 2010

48th Lieutenant Governor of California
- In office April 27, 2010 – January 3, 2011
- Governor: Arnold Schwarzenegger
- Preceded by: Mona Pasquil (acting)
- Succeeded by: Gavin Newsom

Member of the California State Senate from the 15th district
- In office December 6, 2004 – April 27, 2010
- Preceded by: Bruce McPherson
- Succeeded by: Sam Blakeslee

Member of the California State Assembly from the 33rd district
- In office December 7, 1998 – November 30, 2004
- Preceded by: Tom J. Bordonaro Jr.
- Succeeded by: Sam Blakeslee

Mayor of Santa Maria
- In office 1996–1998
- Preceded by: Robert Bunch
- Succeeded by: Joe Centeno

Personal details
- Born: August 21, 1967 (age 58) Santa Maria, California, U.S.
- Party: Republican
- Spouse: Laura Maldonado
- Education: California Polytechnic State University

Abel O. Maldonado Jr. (born August 21, 1967) is an American politician who served as the 48th lieutenant governor of California from April 27, 2010 to January 3, 2011. As of 2026, he is the last Republican to serve as California's Lieutenant Governor.

Elected to the Santa Maria City Council in 1994, Maldonado then served as mayor of Santa Maria from 1996 to 1998, when he was elected to the California State Assembly. He served in that body from 1998 to 2004 and then in the California State Senate from 2004 to 2010, running unsuccessfully for the Republican nomination for California State Controller in 2006. Maldonado was the first Republican in the State Senate to vote for the budget during the budget deadlock in 2007. He represented a swing district in the Senate and is considered a moderate.

On November 23, 2009, then-Governor Arnold Schwarzenegger announced Maldonado as his nominee for lieutenant governor to fill the vacancy created by Democrat John Garamendi's election to the United States House of Representatives. Maldonado was sworn into office on April 27, 2010 and was defeated in the 2010 lieutenant gubernatorial election by Democratic San Francisco Mayor Gavin Newsom.

Maldonado ran for California's 24th congressional district in the 2012 elections, but was defeated by incumbent Democrat Lois Capps. In May 2013, he announced that he was running for governor in the 2014 election, but dropped out in January 2014 after unsuccessful fundraising efforts and campaign missteps. In 2017, Maldonado was considered for the role of United States secretary of agriculture by Donald Trump, but was ultimately not nominated.

== Early life and education ==
Maldonado was born in Santa Maria, California, the eldest son of immigrant Mexican farm workers. His family eventually acquired a small family farm, where they grew strawberries. After Maldonado graduated from Santa Maria High School, his family used their earnings from the farm to send him to California Polytechnic State University in San Luis Obispo, where he studied crop science, but dropped out before completing his degree. Maldonado then returned to his family's farm and helped his family grow the half-acre strawberry farm into a 6,000-acre (24 km²) farm, employing 250 people, with produce shipped around the world.

== Early political career ==
=== Santa Maria city politics ===
After months of attempting to obtain a building permit from the city of Santa Maria to construct a cooling facility on the farm, Maldonado grew disillusioned with the city bureaucracy and decided to run for the Santa Maria City Council in 1994 at the age of 26. In 1996, at the age of 28, Councilman Maldonado successfully ran for mayor, defeating the incumbent Mayor Robert Gordon Bunch and retiree George Hobbs 40%-39%-21%, a margin of 70 votes.

=== California Assembly ===
==== Elections ====
In 1998, at the age of 31, Mayor Maldonado was elected to the California State Assembly with 60% of the vote in the 33rd District, representing San Luis Obispo County and western Santa Barbara County. Maldonado was re-elected in 2000 with 65% of the vote and in 2002 with 63% of the vote.

==== Tenure ====
During his Assembly tenure, Maldonado was named "Hero of the Taxpayer" by the Americans for Tax Reform. He led issues such as seat belts in school buses and California Workers Compensation Reform.

==== Committee assignments ====
He was on the Business and Professions committee.

=== California Senate ===
==== Elections ====
In 2004, Maldonado was elected to the California State Senate by a margin of 53% to 43% over his Democratic opponent, San Luis Obispo County Supervisor Peg Pinard, in a district evenly divided between Democrats and Republicans. The 15th District included San Luis Obispo County, most of Monterey County, eastern Santa Cruz County, portions of northwestern Santa Barbara County, and portions of southwestern Santa Clara County.

==== Tenure ====
In March 2005, a San Luis Obispo weekly newspaper revealed that Maldonado had received $30,987 in gifts from an organization representing California's power industry. Those gifts included multiple trips to Australia, Africa and Europe. The story suggested that the gifts might have motivated Maldonado to object to a seismic safety bill that could potentially have threatened Diablo Canyon Power Plant's license to operate. According to the story, Maldonado snapped at the reporter, "“I have never, ever, ever connected monetary resources with a bill or a special company in my area. For somebody to even suggest that is disappointing."

Maldonado signed a "No New Taxes" pledge before his election which he later claimed to regret as he cast a vote for higher taxes.

In February 2009, Maldonado was initially among the Republican senators rejecting a series of bills designed to close the $41 billion state budget deficit, but he later joined the Democrats in supporting the measures.

A committee indicated that it might pursue a recall campaign against Maldonado because of his vote on the budget. The same threat was made against other Republicans in the "Sacramento Six", but none of the recall campaigns came to anything. (Most of the recall energy was directed against Anthony Adams.)

In response to his critics, including Steve Poizner, Maldonado said, "Since the budget was passed, you have gone around the state criticizing it and the role six Republicans played in its passage. Your recent statements condemning Propositions 1A-1F are very frustrating. During the budget debate, which lasted over 100 days, I heard from thousands of Californians who took the time to give me their input on the state budget. But I never heard from you."

==== Committee assignments ====
In December 2006, he was named Chairman of the Senate Agriculture Committee.

- Budget and Fiscal Review
- Education
- Health
- Veterans Affairs
- Food and Agriculture (Vice Chair)
- Human Services (Vice Chair)

=== 2006 state controller election ===
In 2005, Maldonado declared his candidacy for the office of California State Controller after Controller Steve Westly decided to run for governor. Maldonado was defeated in the June 6, 2006 Republican primary by Tony Strickland.

Following his loss, Maldonado publicly criticized Governor Arnold Schwarzenegger for not supporting his campaign more forcefully, suggesting that Schwarzenegger did not care about Hispanics, when he told the Los Angeles Times that "[w]hen [Schwarzenegger] needs Latinos, Latinos are always there for him. When Latinos need him, the answer's been no." Maldonado issued a public apology for the comment. He also maintained that he would not run for any further political office after his state Senate service; he was re-elected to the Senate in 2008 with 63% of the vote.

== Lieutenant governor ==
=== Nomination ===
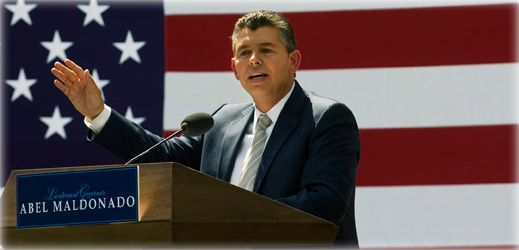
Lt. Governor Maldonado giving a speech, 2010

On November 3, 2009, Lieutenant Governor John Garamendi resigned to take a seat in Congress. On the November 23, 2009, episode of The Jay Leno Show, Governor Arnold Schwarzenegger announced that he was nominating Maldonado as lieutenant governor. Schwarzenegger cited Maldonado's "bipartisanship and postpartisanship...He makes decisions based on what's best for the people rather than what's best for the party. He has helped us, many times, pass a budget, which was very important. And he comes from an immigrant family..."

Maldonado needed to be confirmed by a majority vote of the State Senate and a majority vote of the State Assembly within 90 days of the nomination in order to take office as lieutenant governor. In a statement released by the Governor's office, Schwarzenegger called Maldonado a "true partner" and cited his willingness "to reach across the partisan divide" and "commitment to creating a transparent, accountable government" in California.

=== Tenure ===
On February 11, 2010, Maldonado was confirmed as lieutenant governor by the state Senate by a 26-7 vote. However, his nomination was not approved by the State Assembly. Needing 41 votes (in the 80-seat Assembly) for confirmation in the lower chamber, he received 37 votes in favor, with 35 votes against.

Based upon the vote in the Legislature, Governor Schwarzenegger considered having Maldonado sworn into office, which may have set up a legal battle with Democrats. Instead, Schwarzenegger resubmitted the nomination of Maldonado on February 17. Maldonado received confirmation from the Assembly on April 22, 2010 by a 53-21 vote and from the Senate on April 26, 2010 by a 25-7 vote. He was sworn in as Lieutenant Governor on April 27, 2010.

=== 2010 election ===
Maldonado ran for the Republican nomination for the office in June and won with 43.4% of the vote. Maldonado was defeated on November 2, 2010 by Democratic San Francisco Mayor Gavin Newsom.

== Career since 2010 ==
=== 2012 congressional campaign ===
In 2011, Maldonado announced his intention to challenge U.S. Representative Lois Capps, a Democrat, for her seat in the U.S. House of Representatives in the 2012 elections.

Maldonado was defeated by Capps in the election by a 55.2% to 44.8% margin.

=== 2014 run for governor ===
On May 20, 2013, Maldonado announced he would run as a Republican in California’s 2014 gubernatorial election.

On June 28, 2013, Maldonado came out in support of the Supreme Court's ruling that cleared the way for same-sex marriage in California, and said that same-sex couples should be afforded the same rights and protections as heterosexual couples. Although Maldonado had supported Proposition 8 in 2008, he reversed his position in 2011 when a cousin revealed that he was gay. He also said his four children helped change his position.

Maldonado withdrew from the race on January 16, 2014. His campaign was beset by problems: he accused Governor Brown of things that occurred years before he was elected, he struggled to raise money, his campaign's senior staff left in September 2013, and his campaign failed to gain traction after the entry of fellow Republicans Tim Donnelly and Neel Kashkari into the race. In announcing his withdrawal, Maldonado said: "Now is not my time... I know it's cliché to say I am not running so I can spend more time with my family. Everybody says that. But the truth is, that is, a major factor in my decision today. I have missed some birthdays, family holidays and even anniversaries. From this day forward [my wife] now controls my schedule."

=== Potential Trump administration appointment ===
In January 2017, it was reported by CNN that Maldonado was an early frontrunner to serve as United States secretary of agriculture in the cabinet of then-President-elect Donald Trump. His potential nomination was supported by the National Association of Latino Elected and Appointed Officials. However, Sonny Perdue was ultimately chosen for the role instead, a move that was criticized by former Governor Schwarzenegger.

== See also ==
- List of minority governors and lieutenant governors in the United States

California Assembly
Preceded by Tom Bordonaro	Member of the California State Assembly from the 33rd district 1998–2004	Succeeded by Sam Blakeslee
California Senate
Preceded by Bruce McPherson	Member of the California State from the 24th district 2004–2010	Succeeded by Sam Blakeslee
Political offices
Preceded by Mona Pasquil; Acting	Lieutenant Governor of California; 2010–2011	Succeeded by Gavin Newsom
