= Mulford Act =

1967 California law outlawing open carrying of firearms

California Legislature
- Long title: An act to add Sections 171c, 171d, 171e, and 12031 to the Penal Code, relating to firearms and declaring the urgency thereof, to take effect immediately.
- Passed by: California State Assembly
- Passed: June 8, 1967
- Passed by: California State Senate
- Passed: July 27, 1967
- Signed by: Ronald Reagan
- Signed: July 28, 1967
- Effective: July 28, 1967

Legislative history

Initiating chamber: California State Assembly
- Bill title: Firearms law
- Introduced by: Don Mulford
- Co-sponsored by: John T. Knox, Walter J. Karabian, Frank Murphy Jr., Alan Sieroty, William M. Ketchum
- Introduced: April 5, 1967
- First reading: April 5, 1967
- Second reading: June 6, 1967 to June 7, 1967
- Third reading: June 8, 1967

Revising chamber: California State Senate
- Bill title: Firearms law
- First reading: June 8, 1967
- Second reading: June 27, 1967
- Third reading: July 26, 1967

The Mulford Act is a 1967 California statute which prohibits public carrying of loaded firearms without a permit. Named after Republican assemblyman Don Mulford and signed into law by governor of California Ronald Reagan, the law was initially crafted with the goal of disarming members of the Black Panther Party, which was conducting armed patrols of Oakland neighborhoods in what would later be termed copwatching. They garnered national attention after Black Panthers members, bearing arms, marched upon the California State Capitol to protest the bill.

Assembly Bill 1591 was introduced by Don Mulford (R) from Oakland on April 5, 1967, and subsequently co-sponsored by John T. Knox (D) from Richmond, Walter J. Karabian (D) from Monterey Park, Frank Murphy Jr. (R) from Santa Cruz, Alan Sieroty (D) from Los Angeles, and William M. Ketchum (R) from Bakersfield. A.B 1591 was made an "urgency statute" under Article IV, §8(d) of the Constitution of California after "an organized band of men armed with loaded firearms [...] entered the Capitol" on May 2, 1967; as such, it required a two-thirds majority in each house. On June 8, after the third reading in the Assembly (controlled by Democrats, 42:38), the urgency clause was adopted, and the bill was then passed 70 to 5. It passed the Senate (split, 20:19) on July 26, 29 votes to 7, and was passed back to the assembly on July 27, 1967 for a final vote, where it passed 62 to 9. The bill was signed by Governor Ronald Reagan on July 28, 1967.

Both Republicans and Democrats in California supported increased gun control, as did the National Rifle Association of America. Governor Ronald Reagan, who was coincidentally present on the Capitol lawn when the protesters arrived, later commented that he saw "no reason why on the street today a citizen should be carrying loaded weapons" and that guns were a "ridiculous way to solve problems that have to be solved among people of good will." In a later press conference, Reagan added that the Mulford Act "would work no hardship on the honest citizen."

The bill was signed by Reagan and became California penal code nr.25850 and nr.171c.

== California State Assembly ==
=== Composition ===
↓
42	38
Democratic	Republican

=== Final vote ===
Affiliation	Party (Shading indicates majority caucus)		Total
Affiliation	Democratic	Republican	Total
For	34	28	62
Against	5	4	9
Abstain or Missing	3	6	9

=== Members and voting record ===
Name	June 8 Vote on Urgency Clause, and Vote on passage of bill to Senate	July 27 Vote on Senate amendments to bill
Badham, Robert E. (R)	Yes	-
Bagley, William T. (R)	Yes	Yes
Barnes, E. Richard (R)	No	Yes
Bear, Frederick James (D)	Yes	Yes
Bee, Carlos (D)	Yes	Yes
Belotti, Frank P. (R)	Yes	Yes
Beverly, Robert G. (R)	Yes	Yes
Biddle, W. Craig (R)	Yes	-
Brathwaite, Yvonne W. (D)	Yes	Yes
Briggs, John V. (R)	Yes	Yes
Britschgi, Carl A. (R)	Yes	Yes
Brown, Willie L., Jr. (D)	Yes	Yes
Burke, Robert H. (R)	No	No
Burton, John L. (D)	Yes	Yes
Campbell, William (R)	-	-
Chappie, Eugene A. (R)	Yes	Yes
Collier, John L. E. (R)	Yes	Yes
Conrad, Charles J. (R)	Yes	Yes
Cory, Kenneth (D)	No	No
Crandall, Earle P. (R)	Yes	Yes
Crown, Robert W. (D)	Yes	Yes
Cullen, Mike (D)	Yes	Yes
Davis, Pauline L. (D)	Yes	Yes
Deddeh, Wadie P. (D)	Yes	Yes
Dent, James W. (R)	Yes	Yes
Duffy, Gordon W. (R)	Yes	Yes
Dunlap, John F. (D)	Yes	No
Elliott, Edward E. (D)	Yes	Yes
Fenton, Jack R. (D)	Yes	Yes
Fong, March K. (D)	Yes	Yes
Foran, John F. (D)	Yes	Yes
Gonsalves, Joe A. (D)	Yes	-
Greene, Bill (D)	Yes	Yes
Greene, Leroy F. (D)	Yes	-
Hayes, James A. (R)	Yes	Yes
Hinckley, Stewart (R)	Yes	-
Johnson, Harvey (D)	Yes	Yes
Johnson, Ray E (R)	-	Yes
Karabian, Walter J. (D)	Yes	Yes
Ketchum, William M. (R)	Yes	Yes
Knox, John T. (D)	Yes	Yes
Lanterman, Frank (R)	Yes	Yes
MacDonald, John Kenyon (D)	Yes	Yes
McGee, Patrick (R)	Yes	Yes
McMillan, Lester A. (D)	Yes	Yes
Meyers, Charles W. (D)	Yes	Yes
Milias, George W. (R)	Yes	Yes
Monagan, Bob (R)	Yes	-
Miller, John J. (D)	-	No
Mobley, Ernest N. (R)	-	No
Moorhead, Carlos J. (R)	Yes	Yes
Moretti, Bob (D)	Yes	Yes
Mulford, Don R. (R)	Yes	Yes
Murphy, Frank, Jr. (R)	Yes	Yes
Negri, David (D)	Yes	Yes
Pattee, Alan G. (R)	Yes	Yes
Porter, Carley V. (D)	No	No
Powers, Walter W. (D)	Yes	Yes
Priolo, Paul (R)	-	Yes
Quimby, John P. (D)	Yes	Yes
Ralph, Leon (D)	Yes	Yes
Roberti, David A. (D)	Yes	Yes
Russell, Newton R. (R)	Yes	Yes
Ryan, Leo J. (D)	Yes	No
Schabarum, Peter F. (R)	Yes	Yes
Shoemaker, Winfield A. (D)	Yes	Yes
Sieroty, Alan (D)	Yes	Yes
Stacey, Kent H. (R)	Yes	Yes
Stull, John (R)	No	No
Thomas, Vincent (D)	Yes	Yes
Townsend, L. E. (D)	Yes	Yes
Unruh, Jesse M. (D), Speaker	Yes	Yes
Vasconcellos, John (D)	Yes	Yes
Veneman, John G. (R)	Yes	-
Veysey, Victor V. (R)	Yes	Yes
Wakefield, Floyd L. (R)	Yes	No
Warren, Charles (D)	Yes	-
Wilson, Peter B. (R)	Yes	Yes
Zenovich, George N. (D)	Yes	Yes
Z'berg, Edwin (D)	Yes	Yes

== California State Senate ==
=== Composition ===
Composition is at the time of voting. McAteer (D) died in office in May 1967.

↓
20	19
Democratic	Republican

=== Final vote ===
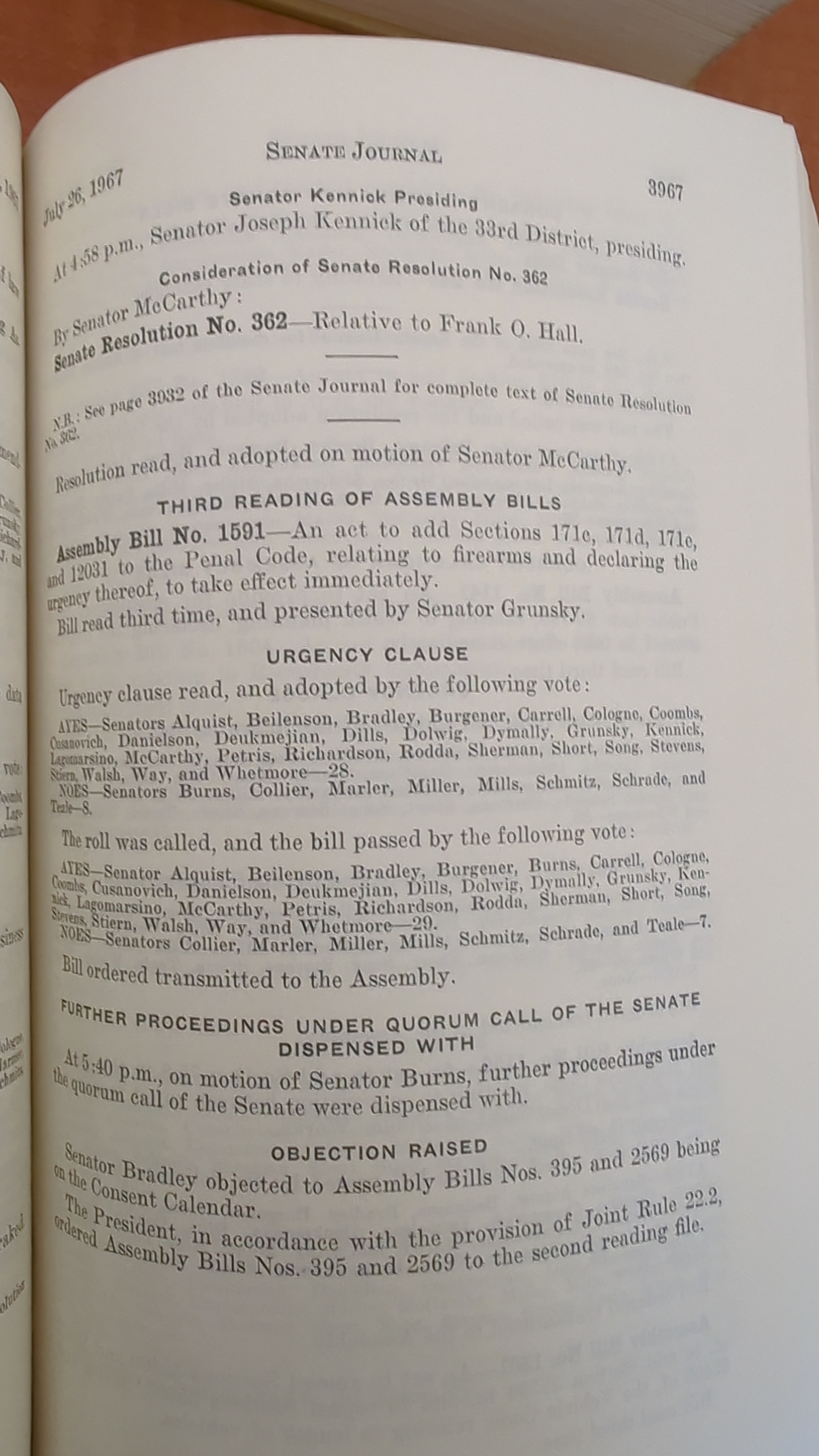
California State Senate Journal entry

Affiliation	Party (Shading indicates majority caucus)		Total
Affiliation	Democratic	Republican	Total
For	14	15	29
Against	4	3	7
Abstain or Missing	2	1	3

=== Members and voting record ===
Name	July 26 Vote on Urgency Clause	July 26 Vote on passage of Bill
Alquist, Alfred E.(D)	Yes	Yes
Beilenson, Anthony (D)	Yes	Yes
Bradley, Clark L. (R)	Yes	Yes
Burgener, Clair W. (R)	Yes	Yes
Burns, Hugh M. (D)	No	Yes
Carrell, Tom (D)	Yes	Yes
Collier, Randolph (D)	No	No
Cologne, Gordon (R)	Yes	Yes
Coombs, William E. (R)	Yes	Yes
Cusanovich, Lou (R)	Yes	Yes
Danielson, George E. (D)	Yes	Yes
Deukmejian, George (R)	Yes	Yes
Dills, Ralph C. (D)	Yes	Yes
Dolwig, Richard J. (R)	Yes	Yes
Dymally, Mervyn M. (D)	Yes	Yes
Grunsky, Donald L. (R)	Yes	Yes
Harmer, John L. (R)	-	-
Kennick, Joseph M. (D)	Yes	Yes
Lagomarsino, Robert J. (R)	Yes	Yes
Marler, Fred W., Jr. (R)	No	No
McCarthy, John F. (R)	Yes	Yes
Miller, George, Jr. (D)	No	No
Mills, James (D)	No	No
Moscone, George R. (D)	-	-
Petris, Nicholas C. (D)	Yes	Yes
Richardson, H.L. (R)	Yes	Yes
Rodda, Albert S. (D)	Yes	Yes
Schmitz, John G. (R)	No	No
Schrade, Jack (R)	No	No
Sherman, Lewis F. (R)	Yes	Yes
Short, Alan (D)	Yes	Yes
Song, Alfred H. (D)	Yes	Yes
Stevens, Robert S. (R)	Yes	Yes
Stiern, Walter W. (D)	Yes	Yes
Teale, Stephen P. (D)	No	No
Walsh, Lawrence E. (D)	Yes	Yes
Way, Howard (R)	Yes	Yes
Wedworth, James Q. (D)	-	-
Whetmore, James E. (R)	Yes	Yes

== Litigation ==
On January 3, 2026, the United States Court of Appeals for the Ninth Circuit struck down the state's ban on open carrying of firearms, citing the Second Amendment and the New York State Rifle & Pistol Ass'n v. Bruen decision.

== See also ==
- Black Panther Party
