= Governorship of Ronald Reagan =

Political career of Ronald Reagan

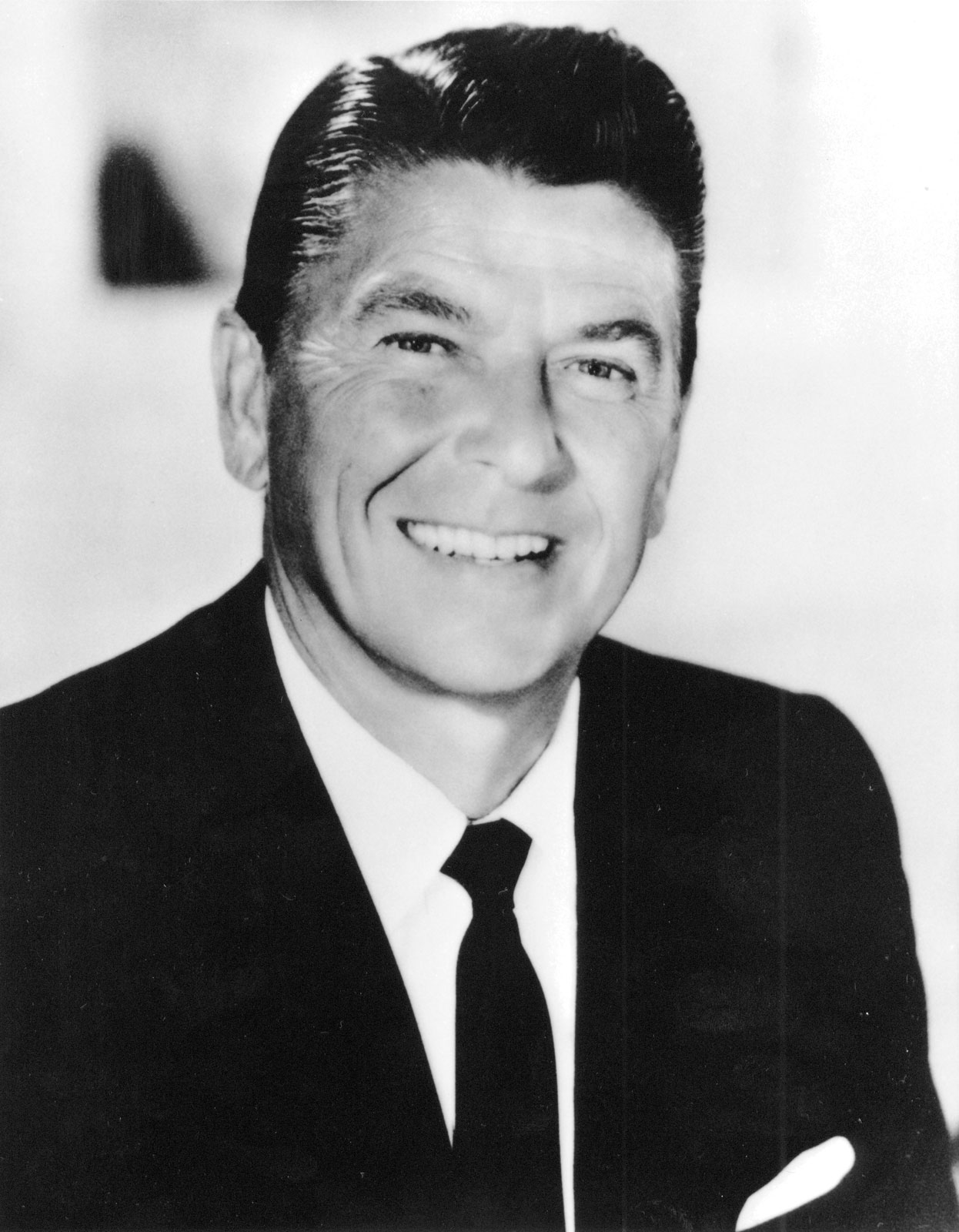
- Official portrait, 1967
- Governorship of Ronald Reagan; January 2, 1967 – January 6, 1975
- Party: Republican
- Election: 1966; 1970
- Seal of California

Ronald Reagan was the 33rd governor of California for two terms, the first commencing in 1967 and the second in 1971. He left office in 1975, declining to run for a third term. Robert Finch, Edwin Reinecke and John L. Harmer served as lieutenant governors over the course of his governorship.

== 1966 election ==
External audio
- Speech to the National Press Club
- Reagan's speech on June 16, 1966 (starts at 06:16; finishes at 39:04)

California Republicans were impressed with Reagan's conservative political views and charisma after his "A Time for Choosing" speech for the Goldwater presidential campaign in 1964. David S. Broder called it “the most successful national political debut since William Jennings Bryan electrified the 1896 Democratic convention with the ‘Cross of Gold’ speech." Reagan assembled advisors and financiers, and in late 1965 he announced his campaign for governor in the 1966 election. Incumbent Governor Pat Brown intervened indirectly in the Republican primary to undermine former San Francisco mayor George Christopher, thinking that Reagan, as a politically inexperienced movie actor, would be easier to beat. Christopher lost. Against Brown, Reagan emphasized two main themes: "to send the welfare bums back to work," and, in reference to burgeoning anti-war and anti-establishment student protests at the University of California, Berkeley, "to clean up the mess at Berkeley." He was elected to his first term on November 8, 1966, with 58% of the vote, defeating incumbent governor Pat Brown, by 993,739 votes.

Reagan was elected governor in 1966 with 57.5 percent of the vote.

Reagan was sworn in on January 2, 1967 at ten minutes past midnight—starting early to prevent Brown from naming judges at the last minute.

== First term (1967–1971) ==
=== Staffing ===
Reagan's efficiency as governor depended on his three support groups. His high visibility Hollywood supporters included Bob Hope, Jack Benny, Dinah Shore, George Burns, James Cagney, John Wayne and Jimmy Stewart, as well as producers Walt Disney and Taft B. Schreiber of MCA. His campaign was managed by the well-known firm of Spencer and Roberts. Funding came from California businessman and financiers including Union Oil chief executive A.C. “Cy” Rubel; auto dealer Holmes Tuttle; Henry Salvatori; Alfred S. Bloomingdale; Leonard Firestone; and Justin Dart. The governor's key staffers included chief of staff Philip Battaglia, Lyn Nofziger, Thomas C. Reed, William P. Clark Jr., Edwin Meese, Michael Deaver, and personal lawyer William French Smith. Nancy Reagan, the foundation of his emotional support, was the most important member of the team.

When his advisers discovered that chief of staff Battaglia was an active homosexual partnering with junior staff, nine went to Reagan as a group and demanded Battaglia be fired. Reagan was relatively at ease with the gay community in Hollywood, but the California electorate was less tolerant. Reagan chose Clark to replace Battaglia, and the story lost momentum.

=== Taxes ===
Reagan campaigned as a tax cutter, promising to squeeze, cut, and trim. Once in office he froze government hiring but increased spending by 9%. He worked with Democrat Jess Unruh, the Assembly Speaker, to secure a series of tax increases that raised rates and balanced the budget, while also cutting property taxes. The sales tax was raised from 3% to 5%. The highest income tax bracket saw a rise from 7% tax to 10%. Taxes on banks, corporate profits, and inheritance were increased slightly. Liquor taxes jumped from $1.50 to $2.00 per gallon; and cigarette taxes from three cents to ten cents per pack. Lou Cannon wrote in 2003: "Reagan's proposal had the distinction of being the largest tax hike ever proposed by any governor in the history of the United States."

=== Mental health care ===
By 1968, the number of patients in California mental hospitals declined from about 33,000 to 20,000 in five years, with most of the remaining patients requiring intensive care in contrast to patients who could be treated off-site with tranquilizers. Reagan proposed cutting 3,700 jobs from the Department of Mental Hygiene, the state agency in charge of mental hospitals. Early in 1967, the Legislative Analyst's Office had recommended closing three mental hospitals and eliminating nearly 3,000 jobs due to the decline in patient population at those hospitals. Most of those employees targeted for cuts would be psychiatric technicians and support staff comprising nearly 16 percent of hospital workers. Eventually, the Legislature passed a budget with only 2,600 job cuts from Mental Hygiene, and Reagan signed that budget without further comment.

In 1967, Reagan signed the Lanterman-Petris-Short Act, a deinstitutionalization bill that ended the practice of sending patients to mental institutions indefinitely or without their consent. Two years into his administration, Reagan advocated a then-record $28 million funding increase for the Department of Mental Hygiene, and subsequent budgets increased funding for community-based mental health care while closing the Modesto State Hospital and some other mental hospitals. There were only around 7,000 mental hospital patients by 1973, midway through Reagan's second term.

=== Abortion issue ===
Early in 1967, the national debate on abortion was beginning and attention was being focused on California. The American Medical Association, the American Bar Association, the American Academy of Pediatrics, the California Medical Association, the California Bar Association, and numerous other groups announced support behind new laws that would protect doctors from criminal prosecution if they performed abortions under rigid hospital controls. A bipartisan majority in the California legislature supported a new law introduced by Democratic state senator Anthony Beilenson, the "Therapeutic Abortion Act". Catholic clergy were strongly opposed but Catholic lay people were divided and non-Catholics strongly supported the proposal. Reagan consulted with his father-in-law, a prominent surgeon who supported the law. He also consulted with James Cardinal McIntyre, the Catholic archbishop of Los Angeles. The archbishop strongly opposed any legalization of abortion and he convinced Reagan to announce he would veto the proposed law since the draft allowed abortions in the case of birth defects. The legislature dropped that provision and Reagan signed the law, which decriminalized abortions when done to protect the health of the mother. The expectation was that abortions would not become more numerous but would become much safer under hospital conditions. In 1968, which was the first full year under the new law, there were 5,018 abortions in California. The numbers grew exponentially and stabilized at about 100,000 annually by the 1970s. Elective abortions were legal, as 99.2% of women who requested an abortion received treatment. One out of every three pregnancies was ended by illegal abortion. The key factor was the sudden emergence of a woman's movement that introduced a very new idea—women had a basic right to control their bodies and could choose to have an abortion or not. Reagan by 1980 found his support among anti-abortion religious groups and said he was too new as governor to make a wise decision.

=== Mulford Act ===
Reagan reacted to the Black Panther Party's strategy of copwatching by signing the Mulford Act in 1967 to prohibit the public carrying of firearms. On May 2, before the act was passed, 26 Panthers were arrested after interrupting a debate on the bill in the California State Capitol. The act was California's most restrictive piece of gun control legislation, with critics saying that it was "overreacting to the political activism of organizations such as the Black Panthers". Reagan also approved additional legislation for a waiting period of fifteen days as a "cooling-off" period for handgun buyers so that they would not purchase weapons in the heat of the moment and could think about their future actions. Although the Panthers gained national attention, their membership barely grew. The act marked the beginning of both modern legislation and public attitude studies on gun control.

=== Berkeley protests ===
Reagan was involved in high-profile conflicts with the protest movements of the era. During his campaign, he repeatedly promised to "clean up the mess at Berkeley" in response to the Free Speech Movement of 1964. According to UC President Clark Kerr, the newly-inaugurated Reagan soon revealed his complete lack of awareness of the traditional role of the University of California in California public higher education. During a January 12, 1967 meeting with several key UC officials to discuss Reagan's proposal to drastically cut the university budget, Reagan criticized UC for accepting the top 12.5% of California high school students, whom he felt should attend private institutions instead, and he argued that as a public institution, UC should take the bottom 12.5%, that it should take "the Mexicans". Reagan then followed through on his promise to clean up the university by appointing several new regents to the UC Board of Regents who, together with himself (in his capacity as an ex officio regent) aligned with existing board members to form a majority (14 to 8) to vote for Kerr's dismissal on January 20, 1967. In a February 3, 1967 letter to Kerr, Regent Thomas M. Storke criticized the "brutal, cruel, and asinine" manner in which Reagan had carried out Kerr's dismissal and also noted that "Ananias is a symbol of Truth compared to Ronnie."

On May 15, 1969, during the People's Park protests at UC Berkeley, Reagan sent the California Highway Patrol and other officers to quell the protests, in an incident that became known as "Bloody Thursday." The student newspaper headlines blared:

POLICE SEIZE PARK; SHOOT AT LEAST 35;
March Triggers Ave. Gassing; Bystanders, Students Wounded; Emergency, Curfew Enforced.

Reagan then called out 2,200 state National Guard troops to occupy the city of Berkeley for two weeks in order to crack down on the protesters. W.J. Rorabaugh argues that Reagan was unable to break the power of liberal faculty and administrators, or of radical students. However those groups were astonished by Reagan's popularity, and drastically underestimated the force of conservative reaction against higher education.

=== No-fault divorce ===
California was the first U.S. state to enact a no-fault divorce law. The law was signed by Governor Reagan and came into effect in 1970.

=== China issue ===
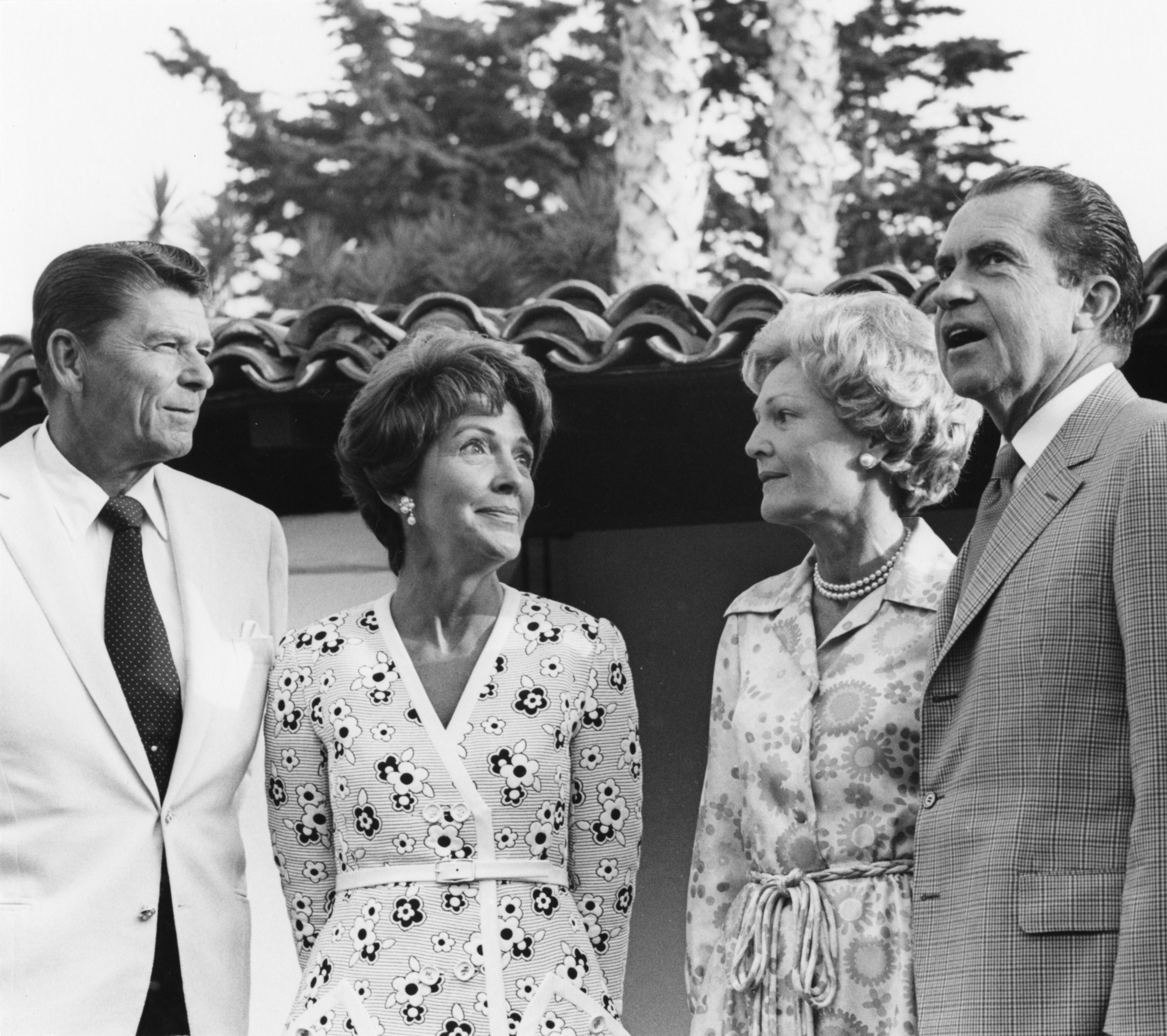
The Reagans meeting with President Richard Nixon and First Lady Pat Nixon in July 1970

Reagan, as governor and later as president, had been a supporter of the Republic of China. Following a 1971 vote in the United Nations in which several delegates voted against the US and decided to recognize the People’s Republic of China, Reagan, in a call to President Nixon, vented his anger at the Tanzanian delegation: "To see those... monkeys from those African countries—damn them, they're still uncomfortable wearing shoes." Nixon told his deputy national security adviser Alexander Haig to cancel any future meetings with any African leader who had not voted with the United States on Taiwan.

=== Presidential campaign ===
Ronald Reagan 1968 presidential campaign logo

Shortly after the beginning of his term, Reagan tested the presidential waters in 1968 as part of a "Stop Nixon" movement, hoping to cut into Nixon's Southern support and be a compromise candidate if neither Nixon nor second-place Nelson Rockefeller received enough delegates to win on the first ballot at the Republican convention. However, by the time of the convention Nixon had 692 delegate votes, 25 more than he needed to secure the nomination, followed by Rockefeller with Reagan–having not officially entered the race–in third place.

=== Republican Governors Association chairmanship ===
In December 1968, Reagan was elected chair of the Republican Governors Association, succeeding John Chafee. He remained in the role until he was succeeded by Raymond P. Shafer in December 1969.

== Second term (1971–1975) ==
An unsuccessful attempt to recall Reagan in 1968 was supported by senior citizens, educators, and organized labor. Reagan was re-elected in 1970, defeating "Big Daddy" Jesse M. Unruh on November 3 with 52.85% of the vote. He chose not to seek a third term in the following election cycle.

=== Capital punishment ===
One of Reagan's greatest frustrations in office concerned capital punishment, which he strongly supported. His efforts to enforce the state's laws in this area were thwarted when the Supreme Court of California issued its People v. Anderson decision, which invalidated all death sentences issued in California prior to 1972, though the decision was later overturned by a constitutional amendment. The only execution during Reagan's governorship was on April 12, 1967, when Aaron Mitchell's sentence was carried out by the state in San Quentin's gas chamber. The execution of convicted murderer Robert Lee Massie was nearly carried out during Reagan's governorship but was stayed in 1967 by Reagan himself since he wanted Massie to attend the trial of his alleged accomplice. Massie would be executed over three decades later for a separate murder in 2001.

=== School finance reform ===
The 1971 state supreme court decision in Serrano v. Priest required the state to equalize spending on schools between rich and poor districts. Facing a strong Democratic opposition in the legislature, Reagan negotiated compromises with Speaker Bob Moretti that would be attractive to key elements of the Republican base. He cut deals with Moretti, who wanted to satisfy his Democratic base and also build a leadership image as he planned to run for governor himself in 1974. Reagan's strategy was to keep costs down, cut property taxes for homeowners, limit school spending, and provide higher spending for poorer school districts. For support, he looked to Republicans, business groups, the school lobby, and some Assembly Democrats. The final legislation as signed by the governor included the main provision of a new annual grant of $454 million to local school districts, of which $229 million was to reduce school tax rates and $220 million was to supplement existing school aid for poor districts. Special assistance of $83 million was allocated to inner-city schools, a Democratic constituency. In addition, there were side payments to keep other elements happy. The property tax exemption for homeowners was raised from $750 to $1750; this was a Republican constituency. Renters—a major Democratic constituency—received an income tax credit of $25 to $45. Businesses—a Republican constituency—received a cut in the property tax on their inventories. Local governments were paid an extra $7 million a year to set aside open space. This appealed to local officials of both parties and to the new environmentalist movement which at the time was bipartisan. Educators were pleased with $40 million for early childhood education. To pay for all of this, the state sales tax was raised from 5.0% to 6.0%. Corporate income tax went up from 7.6% to 9.0% for corporations and from 11.6% to 13.0% for banks. In addition to new taxes some federal money was used, as well as increased revenue from older taxes. Reagan insisted on adding a major restriction: local governments and school districts could not raise taxes without voter approval. Liberals were upset but agreed to the restriction. As it happened, property values went up steadily and the same rates produced more dollars every year. The result was a victory for both Reagan and Moretti. It gave the governor a reputation for successful deal-making that pleased multiple constituencies. At the same time, Reagan's public rhetoric appealed to hard-line conservatives nationally, his actions in Sacramento appealed to moderates.

=== California Proposition 1 ===
After a string of successes climaxed by a reelection landslide, Reagan in 1973 set his eye on national issues in the 1976 presidential election. He decided his signature issue would be to show America he was a hard-liner on cutting taxes and spending by locking that proposition into the California state constitution through Proposition 1--an initiative that would be on the November 1973 ballot. It cut the state tax and made it more difficult to increase rates. He overreached. Michael Deaver ran the campaign, but since the ballot initiative specified all the details, there was no room to negotiate nor compromise with the opposition. The opposition was led by Assembly Speaker Bob Moretti who forged a coalition of Democratic activists, labor unions, the League of Women Voters, and other organizations. The need to cut state taxes was never clearly presented. Proposition 1 went down to defeat with 54% opposing the measure.

== Legacy ==
During the last year of his tenure, Casa de los Gobernadores was completed as the new official gubernatorial residence, though Reagan never inhabited it. It was subsequently unused by his successor and sold by the state.

=== Education ===
According to Curtis Marez, Reagan became governor partly by vilifying the University of California system, especially Berkeley, as:

sites of radical anti-capitalist, antiwar, and anti-heteronormative politics....he raised fees at state colleges and universities, repeatedly slashed construction budgets for state campuses, and engineered the firing of University of California...president Clark Kerr and the firing of Angela Davis from UCLA.

Education spending increased significantly under the Reagan administration contrary to promises to slash education spending despite demanding annually 20 percent across-the-board cuts in higher education funding. State spending on K-12 schools rose 105% to $2.371 billion from 1966-1967 to 1974-1975. Within California's higher education system from 1966-1967 to 1974-1975, the budget of the University of California system rose 105% to $493 million, the California State University system's budget rose 164% to $480 million, and community college spending rose 323% to $315 million. Student scholarships and loans rose 915% to $43 million. Enrollments also rose, increasing by 5% in K-12, by 44% in the University of California system, by 78% in the California State University system, and by 84% in the community college system.

Shirley Boes Neill concludes the Reagan Administration had many faces:

It used what some considered inflammatory rhetoric and seemed rigid, but in actual dealings, it impressed many observers as flexible and willing to compromise. [An anonymous Democrat] said, "The Reagan Administration vented a lot of right-wing rhetoric to please its supporters and took the conservative position on certain enduring controversies...but in day-to-day dealings with the legislature, the Reagan staff was generally reasonable, always accessible, and they made and kept bargains." Perhaps Wilson Riles [Superintendent of Education] summed up Reagan best with this analysis: "When you got down to working with him, he was far more reasonable than you would expect from the rhetoric.

=== Welfare ===
Reagan's terms as governor helped to shape the policies he would pursue in his later political career as president. By campaigning on a platform of sending "the welfare bums back to work", he spoke out against the idea of the welfare state. He also strongly advocated for less government regulation of the economy and against what he believed to be undue federal taxation. With his eye on national politics, Governor Reagan opposed the negative income tax policy recommended by Presidents Richard Nixon and Jimmy Carter and developed by Milton Friedman. He offered as an alternative the California Welfare Reform Act (CWRA).

Reagan's rhetoric about "welfare queens" suggested fraud was a major concern. He believed that increased welfare led to more illegitimate babies. However, his fears were not supported by the findings of scholarly analysis of the fertility of women receiving Aid to Families with Dependent Children funds. Women did not bear more children when aid was increased, or less when it was decreased. Instead availability of legal abortions—which Reagan supported as governor—seems to be a factor in decreased births to welfare recipients, and the factors of low education, recent migration to the state, and a welfare childhood experience were more closely related to pregnancies.

Reagan's welfare reform, according to historian Garin Burbank, was a modest success:

[A] a policy that increased grants to the clearly eligible (Reagan's "truly needy"), reduced fraud, pursued absconding fathers of illegitimate children, and praised the example of steady, reliable work habits could be considered a modest success, if not exactly the social miracle that soon appeared in some of Reagan's campaign speeches. Reagan's success lay somewhere between the symbolic and the substantial, in the domain of politics, the one shining dominion that he surely wished to master.

Historian Kevin Starr ranks Reagan alongside Hiram Johnson, Earl Warren, and Pat Brown as "great governors" of California. Starr ranks Reagan so high because of his sustained "good-humored relations with key Democrats .. . ," and because, after listening to the latter, he "gave Californians the biggest tax hike in their history--and got away with it."

== In popular culture ==
In Kurt Vonnegut's 1969 anti-war novel Slaughterhouse-Five the main character's wife has a "Reagan for President" bumper sticker on her car.

== See also ==
- Electoral history of Ronald Reagan
- Presidency of Ronald Reagan

== Citations ==
=== Works cited ===
- Cannon, Lou (2003). Governor Reagan: His Rise to Power. New York: PublicAffairs. ISBN 1-58648-030-8 – via Internet Archive.
- Carter, Gregg (2002). Guns in American Society: An Encyclopedia of History, Politics, Culture, and the Law, Volume 1. ABC-Clio. ISBN 978-1-57607-268-4.
- Garrow, David (2007). "Review: Picking up the Books: The New Historiography of the Black Panther Party". Reviews in American History. 35 (4): 650–670. doi:10.1353/rah.2007.0068. JSTOR 30031608. S2CID 145069539.
- Hayes, Matthew; Fortunato, David; Hibbing, Matthew (2020). "Race–gender bias in white Americans' preferences for gun availability". Journal of Public Policy. 41 (4): 818–834. doi:10.1017/S0143814X20000288. hdl:10398/475e94ae-ed36-40e7-a129-076dd129e28f. S2CID 234615039.
