= Thomas Caldecott =

Thomas Caldecott may refer to:

- Thomas E. Caldecott (1878–1951), pharmacist and politician in California
- Thomas W. Caldecott (1914–1994), American judge and politician in California
