= 1970 California gubernatorial election =

- November 3, 1970
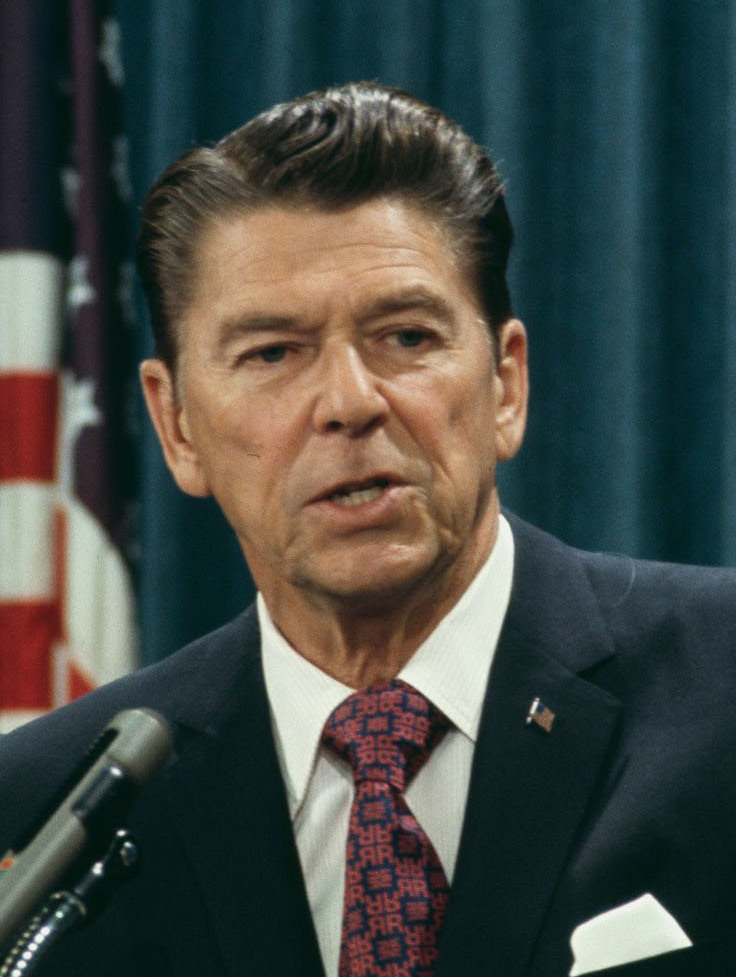

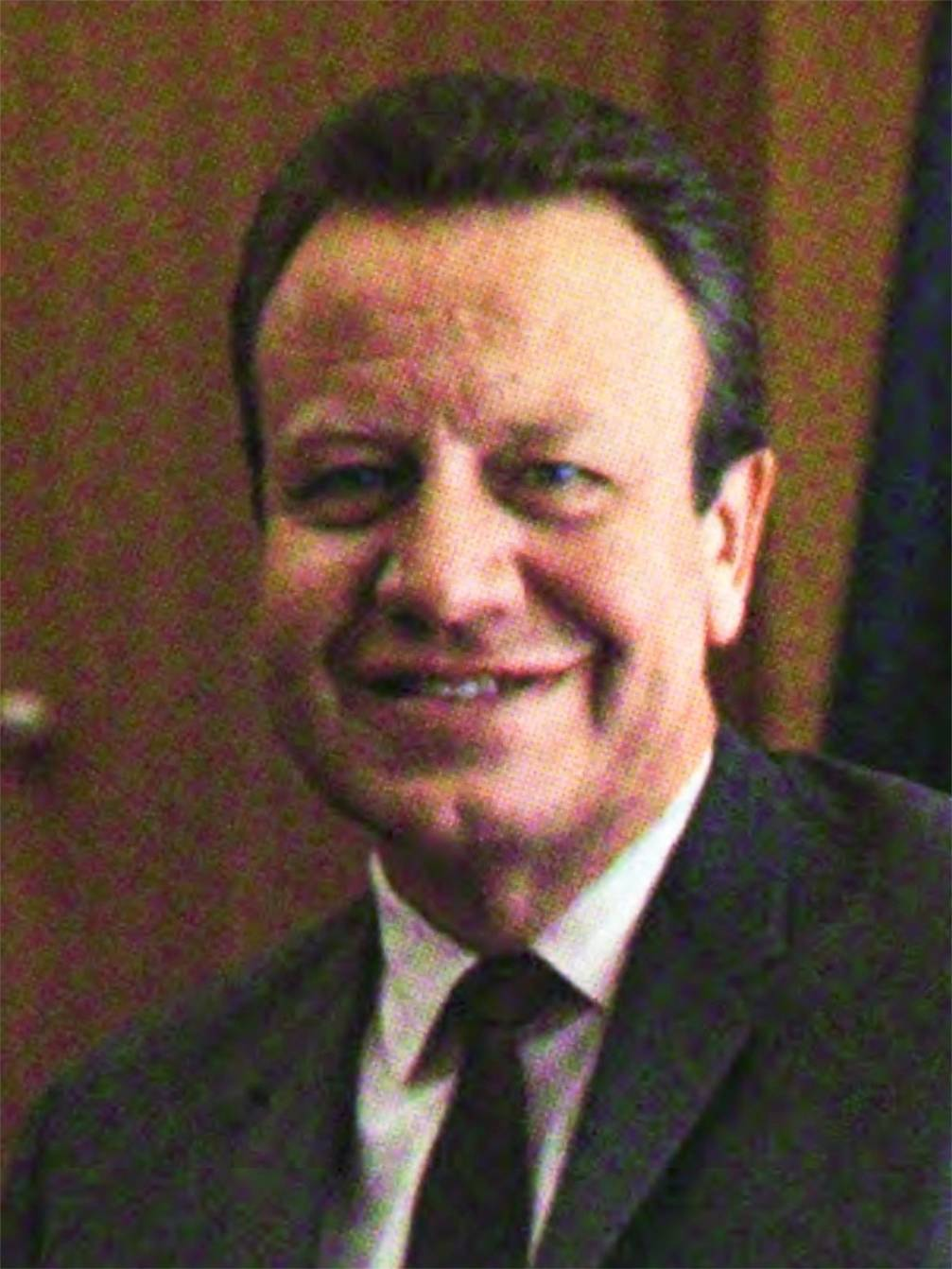
Nominee	Ronald Reagan	Jesse Unruh
Party	Republican	Democratic
Popular vote	3,439,174	2,938,607
Percentage	52.84%	45.14%
- Reagan: 40–50% 50–60% 60–70% 70–80% Unruh: 40–50% 50–60% 60–70% >90%
Governor before election
Ronald Reagan
Republican
Elected Governor
Ronald Reagan
Republican

The 1970 California gubernatorial election was held on November 3, 1970. The incumbent governor, Republican Ronald Reagan, won re-election over Democrat and Speaker of the Assembly Jesse Unruh. This would be the closest victory of Ronald Reagan's entire political career.

== Republican primary ==
=== Candidates ===
- Ronald Reagan, incumbent governor since 1967

=== Results ===
Republican primary results
Party	Candidate	Votes	%
Republican	Ronald Reagan (incumbent)	1,906,568	100.00%
Total votes		1,906,568	100.00%

== Democratic primary ==
=== Candidates ===
- Walter R. Buchanan
- Jack W. Clapper
- Florence E. Douglas, mayor of Vallejo since 1955
- Raymond L. Haight Jr., high school history teacher, anti-war advocate, and son of Raymond Haight
- Harry F. May
- Eddie M. Ramirez, Boyle Heights (Los Angeles) pharmacist
- Joseph S. Ramos
- Jesse M. Unruh, former Speaker of the California Assembly (1961–69) and Assemblyman from Marina del Rey
- George H. Wagner
- Samuel William Yorty, mayor of Los Angeles since 1961

=== Results ===
Democratic primary results
Party	Candidate	Votes	%
Democratic	Jesse M. Unruh	1,602,690	64.03%
Democratic	Samuel William Yorty	659,494	26.35%
Democratic	George H. Wagner	44,118	1.76%
Democratic	Florence E. Douglas	43,456	1.74%
Democratic	Walter R. Buchanan	40,192	1.61%
Democratic	Eddie M. Ramirez	31,092	1.24%
Democratic	Joseph S. Ramos	25,874	1.03%
Democratic	Raymond L. Haight	20,328	0.81%
Democratic	Harry F. May	19,471	0.78%
Democratic	Jack W. Clapper	16,142	0.64%
Democratic	Samuel A. Reeve (write-in)	3	0.00%
Total votes		2,502,861	100.00%

== Other primaries ==
=== American Independent Party ===
American Independent primary results
Party	Candidate	Votes	%
American Independent	William K. Shearer	14,069	61.45%
American Independent	Keith H. Greene	8,827	38.55%
Total votes		22,896	100.00%

=== Peace and Freedom Party ===
Peace and Freedom primary results
Party	Candidate	Votes	%
Peace and Freedom	Ricardo Romo	6,214	63.52%
Peace and Freedom	Warren E. Nielsen	3,569	36.48%
Total votes		9,783	100.00%

== General election results ==
1970 California gubernatorial election
Party	Candidate	Votes	%	±%
Republican	Ronald Reagan (incumbent)	3,439,664	52.84%	−4.72%
Democratic	Jesse M. Unruh	2,938,607	45.14%	+2.87%
Peace and Freedom	Ricardo Romo	65,954	1.01%	
American Independent	William K. Shearer	65,847	1.01%	
Majority		501,057	7.70%	
Total votes		6,510,072	100.00%	
Republican hold		Swing	-7.58%	

=== Results by county ===
County	Ronald Reagan Republican		Jesse M. Unruh Democratic		Ricardo Romo Peace & Freedom		William K. Shearer American Independent		Margin		Total votes cast
County	#	%	#	%	#	%	#	%	#	%	Total votes cast
Alameda	162,727	43.05%	206,693	54.68%	5,591	1.48%	2,975	0.79%	-43,966	-11.63%	377,986
Alpine	203	66.34%	89	29.08%	4	1.31%	10	3.27%	114	37.25%	306
Amador	2,866	53.12%	2,445	45.32%	28	0.52%	56	1.04%	421	7.80%	5,395
Butte	22,656	62.82%	12,558	34.82%	429	1.19%	420	1.16%	10,098	28.00%	36,063
Calaveras	3,499	63.10%	1,947	35.11%	44	0.79%	55	0.99%	1,552	27.99%	5,545
Colusa	2,302	57.69%	1,627	40.78%	26	0.65%	35	0.88%	675	16.92%	3,990
Contra Costa	106,965	53.15%	91,156	45.30%	1,323	0.66%	1,800	0.89%	15,809	7.86%	201,244
Del Norte	2,755	57.13%	1,977	41.00%	37	0.77%	53	1.10%	778	16.13%	4,822
El Dorado	7,932	56.59%	5,818	41.51%	65	0.46%	202	1.44%	2,114	15.08%	14,017
Fresno	60,644	48.74%	61,801	49.67%	752	0.60%	1,227	0.99%	-1,157	-0.93%	124,424
Glenn	3,805	59.37%	2,482	38.73%	39	0.61%	83	1.30%	1,323	20.64%	6,409
Humboldt	16,778	51.12%	15,232	46.41%	400	1.22%	410	1.25%	1,546	4.71%	32,820
Imperial	10,636	58.47%	7,006	38.51%	352	1.93%	198	1.09%	3,630	19.95%	18,192
Inyo	4,006	63.50%	2,202	34.90%	43	0.68%	58	0.92%	1,804	28.59%	6,309
Kern	54,216	55.19%	41,768	42.52%	534	0.54%	1,710	1.74%	12,448	12.67%	98,228
Kings	8,068	49.11%	8,134	49.52%	107	0.65%	118	0.72%	-66	-0.40%	16,427
Lake	5,317	58.18%	3,683	40.30%	46	0.50%	93	1.02%	1,634	17.88%	9,139
Lassen	2,494	44.93%	2,911	52.44%	44	0.79%	102	1.84%	-417	-7.51%	5,551
Los Angeles	1,173,161	50.74%	1,095,899	47.40%	21,891	0.95%	21,312	0.92%	77,262	3.34%	2,312,263
Madera	6,205	48.94%	6,304	49.72%	73	0.58%	96	0.76%	-99	-0.78%	12,678
Marin	43,092	56.56%	31,525	41.38%	939	1.23%	632	0.83%	11,567	15.18%	76,188
Mariposa	1,568	57.46%	1,111	40.71%	14	0.51%	36	1.32%	457	16.75%	2,729
Mendocino	9,134	53.33%	7,614	44.46%	126	0.74%	252	1.47%	1,520	8.88%	17,126
Merced	12,117	49.64%	11,840	48.50%	247	1.01%	207	0.85%	277	1.13%	24,411
Modoc	1,760	59.40%	1,138	38.41%	24	0.81%	41	1.38%	622	20.99%	2,963
Mono	1,350	73.09%	460	24.91%	21	1.14%	16	0.87%	890	48.19%	1,847
Monterey	33,691	56.63%	24,508	41.19%	722	1.21%	575	0.97%	9,183	15.43%	59,496
Napa	16,844	55.29%	13,018	42.73%	161	0.53%	442	1.45%	3,826	12.56%	30,465
Nevada	6,756	59.45%	4,442	39.09%	77	0.68%	89	0.78%	2,314	20.36%	11,364
Orange	308,982	66.89%	145,420	31.48%	2,981	0.65%	4,557	0.99%	163,562	35.41%	461,940
Placer	13,886	49.37%	13,751	48.89%	149	0.53%	342	1.22%	135	0.48%	28,128
Plumas	2,280	44.97%	2,678	52.82%	27	0.53%	85	1.68%	-398	-7.85%	5,070
Riverside	81,768	56.60%	59,425	41.13%	1,735	1.20%	1,538	1.06%	22,343	15.47%	144,466
Sacramento	105,523	46.04%	120,365	52.52%	1,378	0.60%	1,925	0.84%	-14,842	-6.48%	229,191
San Benito	3,134	59.54%	1,993	37.86%	90	1.71%	47	0.89%	1,141	21.68%	5,264
San Bernardino	107,219	56.57%	77,069	40.66%	2,946	1.55%	2,294	1.21%	30,150	15.91%	189,528
San Diego	253,378	60.11%	158,098	37.51%	4,161	0.99%	5,886	1.40%	95,280	22.60%	421,523
San Francisco	106,606	41.97%	140,829	55.44%	3,958	1.56%	2,625	1.03%	-34,223	-13.47%	254,018
San Joaquin	50,631	55.25%	39,495	43.10%	682	0.74%	833	0.91%	11,136	12.15%	91,641
San Luis Obispo	18,301	55.84%	13,758	41.98%	292	0.89%	425	1.30%	4,543	13.86%	32,776
San Mateo	109,356	54.31%	88,069	43.74%	1,820	0.90%	2,121	1.05%	21,287	10.57%	201,366
Santa Barbara	51,523	60.10%	32,202	37.56%	1,362	1.59%	638	0.74%	19,321	22.54%	85,725
Santa Clara	172,562	51.47%	154,570	46.10%	4,683	1.40%	3,475	1.04%	17,992	5.37%	335,290
Santa Cruz	26,679	58.07%	18,186	39.58%	634	1.38%	445	0.97%	8,493	18.49%	45,944
Shasta	11,864	43.93%	14,643	54.22%	156	0.58%	343	1.27%	-2,779	-10.29%	27,006
Sierra	617	46.92%	674	51.25%	7	0.53%	17	1.29%	-57	-4.33%	1,315
Siskiyou	6,092	49.58%	5,920	48.18%	96	0.78%	180	1.46%	172	1.40%	12,288
Solano	21,939	48.43%	21,583	47.64%	774	1.71%	1,006	2.22%	356	0.79%	45,302
Sonoma	44,823	58.60%	29,953	39.16%	830	1.09%	881	1.15%	14,870	19.44%	76,487
Stanislaus	29,157	45.07%	34,510	53.34%	640	0.99%	391	0.60%	-5,353	-8.27%	64,698
Sutter	9,084	64.48%	4,811	34.15%	76	0.54%	118	0.84%	4,273	30.33%	14,089
Tehama	5,500	52.46%	4,819	45.97%	55	0.52%	110	1.05%	681	6.50%	10,484
Trinity	1,643	50.21%	1,549	47.34%	15	0.46%	65	1.99%	94	2.87%	3,272
Tulare	27,564	57.69%	19,327	40.45%	432	0.90%	456	0.95%	8,237	17.24%	47,779
Tuolumne	4,567	53.74%	3,779	44.46%	88	1.04%	65	0.76%	788	9.27%	8,499
Ventura	63,790	58.64%	42,350	38.93%	1,343	1.23%	1,308	1.20%	21,440	19.71%	108,791
Yolo	12,344	41.01%	17,135	56.92%	338	1.12%	286	0.95%	-4,791	-15.92%	30,103
Yuba	5,305	54.74%	4,258	43.93%	47	0.48%	82	0.85%	1,047	10.80%	9,692
Total	3,439,664	52.84%	2,938,607	45.14%	65,954	1.01%	65,847	1.01%	501,057	7.70%	6,510,072

=== Counties that flipped from Republican to Democratic ===
- Fresno
- Kings
- Lassen
- Madera
- Sacramento
- Shasta
- Sierra
- Stanislaus
- Yolo

== See also ==
- 1970 Folsom Prison strike
