= Electoral history of Ronald Reagan =

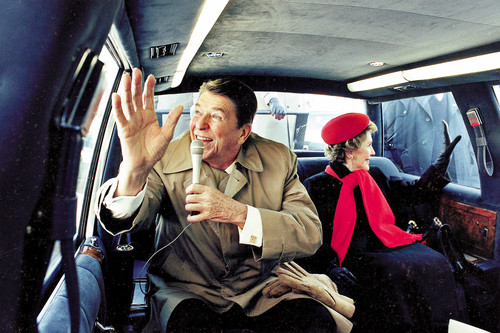
On the campaign trail, President Reagan and First Lady Nancy Reagan wave from limousine while touring Dixon, Illinois. February 1984.

This is the electoral history of Ronald Reagan. Reagan, a Republican, served as the 40th president of the United States (1981–1989) and earlier as the 33rd governor of California (1967–1975). At 69 years, 349 days of age at the time of his first inauguration, Reagan was the oldest person to assume the presidency in the nation's history, until Donald Trump was inaugurated in 2017 at the age of 70 years, 220 days. In 1984, Reagan won re-election at the age of 73 years, 274 days, and was the oldest person to win a US presidential election until Donald Trump won re-election in the 2024 United States presidential election at the age of 78 years, 145 days.

Having been elected twice to the presidency, Reagan reshaped the Republican Party, led the modern conservative movement, and altered the political dynamic of the United States. His 1980 presidential campaign stressed some of his fundamental principles: lower taxes to stimulate the economy, less government interference in people's lives, states' rights, and a strong national defense.

During his presidency, Reagan pursued policies that reflected his personal belief in individual freedom, brought changes domestically, both to the U.S. economy and expanded military, and contributed to the end of the Cold War. Termed the Reagan Revolution, his presidency would reinvigorate American morale, reinvigorate the American economy and reduce American reliance upon government.

== 1966 California gubernatorial election ==
Results of the 1966 gubernatorial election

California Republicans were impressed with Reagan's political views and charisma after his "Time for choosing" speech, he announced in late 1965, his campaign for Governor of California in 1966. He won the Republican primary with nearly 65% of the vote, not including write-in votes, defeating four other candidates, including former San Francisco mayor George Christopher. Although he did not run in the Democratic primary, Reagan received 27,422 votes as a write-in candidate. Not including write-in candidates, 2,570,396 total votes were cast in the Democratic primary, so Reagan's votes would have comprised about 1% of the total Democratic primary votes. In Reagan's campaign, he emphasized two main themes: "to send the welfare bums back to work", and, in reference to burgeoning anti-war and anti-establishment student protests at the University of California at Berkeley, "to clean up the mess at Berkeley". Ronald Reagan accomplished in 1966 what US Senator William F. Knowland in 1958 and former vice president Richard M. Nixon in 1962 had tried: he was elected, defeating two-term governor Edmund G. "Pat" Brown, and was sworn in as the 33rd governor of California on January 2, 1967.

=== Republican primary ===
1966 Republican primary election results (Note: Vote totals do not include write-in votes, including Sam Yorty who received 3,993 votes, and Pat Brown who received 1,700 votes.)
Party	Candidate	Votes	%
Republican	Ronald Reagan	1,417,623	64.85
Republican	George Christopher	675,683	30.91
Republican	William Penn Patrick	40,887	1.87
Republican	Warren N. Dorn	44,812	2.04
Republican	Joseph R. Maxwell	7,052	0.32
Total votes		2,186,057	100

=== General election ===
1966 California gubernatorial election
Party	Candidate	Votes	%
Republican	Ronald Reagan	3,742,913	57.55
Democratic	Pat Brown (incumbent)	2,749,174	42.27
Other	Various candidates	11,358	0.18
Total votes		6,503,445	100.00
Turnout			77.98
Republican gain from Democratic			

== 1968 presidential election ==
Shortly after the beginning of his term as California governor, Reagan tested the presidential waters in 1968 as part of a "Stop Nixon" movement, hoping to cut into Nixon's Southern support and be a compromise candidate if neither Nixon nor second-place Nelson Rockefeller received enough delegates to win on the first ballot at the Republican convention. However, by the time of the convention Nixon had 692 delegate votes, 25 more than he needed to secure the nomination, followed by Rockefeller with Reagan in third place.

=== Republican presidential primaries ===
Gold denotes a state won by Richard Nixon. Blue denotes a state won by Nelson Rockefeller. Green denotes a state won by James A. Rhodes. Purple denotes a state won by Ronald Reagan. Grey denotes a state that did not hold a primary.

1968 Republican Party presidential primaries
Party	Candidate	Aggregate votes	%	CW
Republican	Ronald Reagan	1,696,632	37.93	1
Republican	Richard Nixon	1,679,443	37.54	10 (Note: Richard Nixon won primaries in 9 states plus the District of Columbia primary.)
Republican	James A. Rhodes	614,492	13.74	1
Republican	Nelson Rockefeller	164,340	3.67	1
Republican	Unpledged	140,639	3.14	0

=== 1968 Republican National Convention ===
1968 Republican presidential nomination
Party	Candidate	Votes: (Initial) Final (Note: First ballot switches following roll call vote.)	%
Republican	Richard Nixon	(692) 1238	92.95
Republican	Nelson Rockefeller	(277)93	6.98
Republican	Ronald Reagan	(182)2	0.07
Republican	James Rhodes	(55)0	—
Republican	George Romney	(50)0	—
Republican	Clifford Case	(22)0	—
Republican	Frank Carlson	(20)0	—
Republican	Others	(35)0	—

== 1970 California gubernatorial election ==
Results

Despite an unsuccessful attempt to recall him in 1968, Reagan was unopposed in the Republican primary and was re-elected in 1970, defeating "Big Daddy" Jesse Unruh. He did not seek a third term in the following election cycle.

=== Republican primary ===
1970 Republican gubernatorial primary * denotes incumbent
Party	Candidate	Votes	%
Republican	Ronald Reagan*	1,906,568	100
Total votes		1,906,568	100.00

=== General election ===
1970 California gubernatorial election * denotes incumbent
Party	Candidate	Votes	%
Republican	Ronald Reagan (incumbent)	3,439,664	52.83
Democratic	Jesse M. Unruh	2,938,607	45.14
Peace and Freedom	Ricardo Romo	65,954	1.01
American Independent	William K. Shearer	65,847	1.01
Total votes		6,510,072	100.00
Turnout			74.78
Republican hold			

== 1976 presidential election ==
Republican presidential primary results: Red indicates a win by Reagan, blue a win by Ford.

Roll call vote for the presidential nomination by state delegations

1976 electoral college vote.

In 1976, Reagan challenged incumbent President Gerald Ford in a bid to become the Republican Party's candidate for president. Reagan soon established himself as the conservative candidate with the support of like-minded organizations such as the American Conservative Union which became key components of his political base, while President Ford was considered a more moderate Republican. Though Reagan lost the Republican nomination, he received 307 write-in votes in New Hampshire, 388 votes as an independent on Wyoming's ballot, and a single electoral vote from a faithless elector in the November election from the state of Washington, which Ford had won over Democratic challenger Jimmy Carter. Ford ultimately lost the general election to Carter.

=== Republican primaries ===
1976 Republican Party presidential primaries * denotes incumbent
Party	Candidate	Aggregate votes	%	CW
Republican	Gerald Ford*	5,529,899	53.29	27 (Note: Gerald Ford won primaries in 26 states plus the District of Columbia primary.)
Republican	Ronald Reagan	4,760,222	45.88	24
Republican	Others	44,626	0.43	0
Republican	Unpledged	34,717	0.34	0

=== Republican National Convention ===
1976 Republican presidential nomination * denotes incumbent
Party	Candidate	Votes	%
Republican	Gerald Ford*	1,187	52.57
Republican	Ronald Reagan	1,070	47.39
Republican	Elliot Richardson	1	0.04

1976 Republican vice presidential nomination
Party	Candidate	Votes	%
Republican	Bob Dole	1,921	85.04
Republican	Abstentions	103	4.56
Republican	Jesse Helms	103	4.56
Republican	Ronald Reagan	27	1.20
Republican	Phil Crane	23	1.02
Republican	John Grady	19	0.84
Republican	Louis Frey	9	0.40
Republican	Anne Armstrong	6	0.27
Republican	Howard Baker	6	0.27
Republican	William F. Buckley	4	0.18
Republican	John Connally	4	0.18
Republican	David C. Treen	4	0.18
Republican	Others	30	1.30

=== Electoral College vote ===
1976 United States presidential election results Electoral College vote * denotes incumbent
Party	Presidential candidate	Vice presidential Candidate	EV
Democratic	Jimmy Carter	Walter Mondale	297
Republican	Gerald Ford*	Bob Dole	240
Republican	Ronald Reagan	Bob Dole	1 (Note: One faithless elector in the state of Washington cast his electoral vote for Ronald Reagan (president) and Bob Dole (vice president).)
Total votes:			538
Votes necessary:			270

== 1980 presidential election ==
1980 electoral college vote

Reagan ran against Democratic incumbent Jimmy Carter and independent candidate John B. Anderson. He was praised by supporters for running a campaign of upbeat optimism. Aided by the Iran hostage crisis and a worsening economy at home marked by high unemployment and inflation, Reagan won the election in a massive landslide. The 1980 presidential election marked the beginning of the Reagan Era, and signified a conservative realignment in national politics. At 69 years old, Reagan was the oldest person ever to become president of the U.S. until 2017, when President Donald Trump was sworn in at the age of 70.

=== Republican presidential primaries ===
Republican presidential primary results: Red indicates a win by Reagan, blue a win by Bush.

1980 Republican Party presidential primaries
Party	Candidate	Aggregate votes	%	CW
Republican	Ronald Reagan	7,709,793	59.79	44
Republican	George H. W. Bush	3,070,033	23.81	7 (Note: George H. W. Bush won primaries in 6 states plus the District of Columbia primary.)
Republican	John B. Anderson	1,572,174	12.19	0
Republican	Howard Baker	181,153	1.41	0
Republican	Phil Crane	97,793	0.76	0
Republican	John Connally	82,625	0.64	0
Republican	Unpledged	68,155	0.53	0

=== Republican National Convention ===
1980 Republican presidential nomination
Party	Candidate	Votes	%
Republican	Ronald Reagan	1,939	97.44
Republican	John B. Anderson	37	1.86
Republican	George H. W. Bush	13	0.65
Republican	Anne Armstrong	1	0.05

=== Presidential election ===
1980 United States presidential election * denotes incumbent
Party	Presidential candidate	Vice presidential Candidate	PV (%)	EV (%)
Republican	Ronald Reagan	George H. W. Bush	43,903,230 (50.75)	489 (90.9)
Democratic	Jimmy Carter*	Walter Mondale*	35,480,115 (41.01)	49 (9.1)
Independent	John B. Anderson	Patrick Lucey	5,719,850 (6.61)	0
Libertarian	Ed Clark	David Koch	921,128 (1.06)	0
Citizens	Barry Commoner	LaDonna Harris	233,052 (0.21)	0
Others			252,303 (0.29)	0
Total votes:			86,509,678	538
Votes necessary:				270

== 1984 presidential election ==
1984 electoral college vote

Reagan ran for reelection as president in 1984, running against Democrat Walter Mondale. Reagan was re-elected, receiving 58.8% of the popular vote to Mondale's 40.6%, and winning 49 of 50 states. Reagan won a record 525 electoral votes (97.6 percent of the 538 votes in the Electoral College), the most by any candidate in American history. This was the second-most lopsided presidential election in modern U.S. history after Franklin D. Roosevelt's 1936 victory over Alfred M. Landon, in which he won 98.5 percent or 523 of the (then-total) 531 electoral votes. At 73 years old, Reagan again became the oldest person elected to the presidency, breaking his own record in 1980.

=== Republican presidential primaries ===
1984 Republican Party presidential primaries * denotes incumbent
Party	Candidate	Aggregate votes	%	CW
Republican	Ronald Reagan*	6,484,987	98.78	50
Republican	Unpledged	55,458	0.85	0
Republican	Harold Stassen	12,749	0.19	0

=== Republican National Convention ===
1984 Republican presidential nomination * denotes incumbent
Party	Candidate	Votes	%
Republican	Ronald Reagan*	2,233	99.91
Republican	Abstentions	2	0.09

=== Presidential election ===
1984 United States presidential election * denotes incumbent
Party	Presidential candidate	Vice presidential Candidate	PV (%)	EV
Republican	Ronald Reagan*	George H. W. Bush*	54,455,472 (58.77)	525 (97.6)
Democratic	Walter Mondale	Geraldine Ferraro	37,577,352 (40.56)	13 (2.4)
Libertarian	David Bergland	James Lewis	228,111 (0.25)	0
Others			393,298 (0.42)	0
Total votes:			92,653,233	538
Votes necessary:				270

== See also ==
- Reagan coalition, the combination of voters who supported Reagan and his election campaigns.
- Reagan Democrat, a traditionally Democratic voter who defected from their party to support Reagan in 1980 and 1984.
- Reagan's coattails, the influence of Reagan's popularity on elections other than his own, after the American political expression to "ride in on another's coattails."

== Bibliography ==
- Troy, Gil; Schlesinger, Arthur M.; Israel, Fred L. (2012). History of American Presidential Elections, 1789–2008. Vol. 3 (4 ed.). New York City: Facts on File. ISBN 978-0-8160-8220-9.
