= California's 12th district =

California's 12th district may refer to:

- California's 12th congressional district
- California's 12th State Assembly district
- California's 12th State Senate district
