= Myldred Jones =

American Naval officer

Myldred Jones (born August 5, 1909, in Philadelphia, Pennsylvania, died June 19, 2006, in Los Alamitos, California) was a US Navy officer and a consultant to then California Governor Ronald Reagan on youth and homelessness.

== Early life ==
Jones attended Wittenburg University in Springfield, Ohio, where she studied social sciences and religious education. After graduation, Jones worked as a teacher, social worker, and juvenile probation officer. She then entered the Navy, where she served for 17 years. Jones retired with the rank of Lieutenant Commander.

After leaving the Navy, Jones worked as a liaison officer with the United Nations and as a civil rights activist.

== Youth services ==
During the 1960s Jones became a consultant for Governor Ronald Reagan. She initiated research on youth and homeless shelters in California. In 1968, Jones started the first adolescent hotline. Since opening, the hotline has reached over 600,000 people. Each month, over 2,000 people call it.

In 1978, Jones started Casa de Bienvenidos, a youth shelter. To finance the shelter, she sold her house. The shelter provides short term and extended placement programs, counseling, a school outreach program, a youth leadership program, and parenting classes. Since opening, Casa de Bienvenidos has served over 10,000 youth who have spent over 91,000 nights there.

== Awards ==
- Presidential Recognition Award for Community Service awarded by President Ronald Reagan, 1988
- Pope John XXIII Award, 1995
