= Don Mulford =

American politician from California (1915–2000)

Member of the California State Assembly from the 18th district
- In office January 3, 1958 - January 7, 1963
- Preceded by: Thomas W. Caldecott
- Succeeded by: Edward M. Gaffney

Member of the California State Assembly from the 16th district
- In office January 7, 1963 - January 4, 1971
- Preceded by: Walter I. Dahl
- Succeeded by: Kenneth A. Meade

Personal details
- Born: David Donald Mulford; August 27, 1915 Oakland, California, U.S.
- Died: March 20, 2000 (aged 84) Oakland, California, U.S.
- Party: Republican
- Children: 3
- Education: University of California, Berkeley

Military service
- Allegiance: United States
- Branch/service: United States Army
- Rank: Lieutenant
- Battles/wars: World War II

David Donald Mulford (August 27, 1915 – March 20, 2000) served in the California State Assembly for the 16th and 18th district from 1958 to 1971. During World War II he also served in the United States Army.

The Mulford Act, named after Don Mulford, was a 1967 California bill that prohibited the carrying of loaded firearms in public. The bill attracted national attention when the Black Panthers marched on the California Capitol to protest the bill.
