= Damon Connolly =

American politician

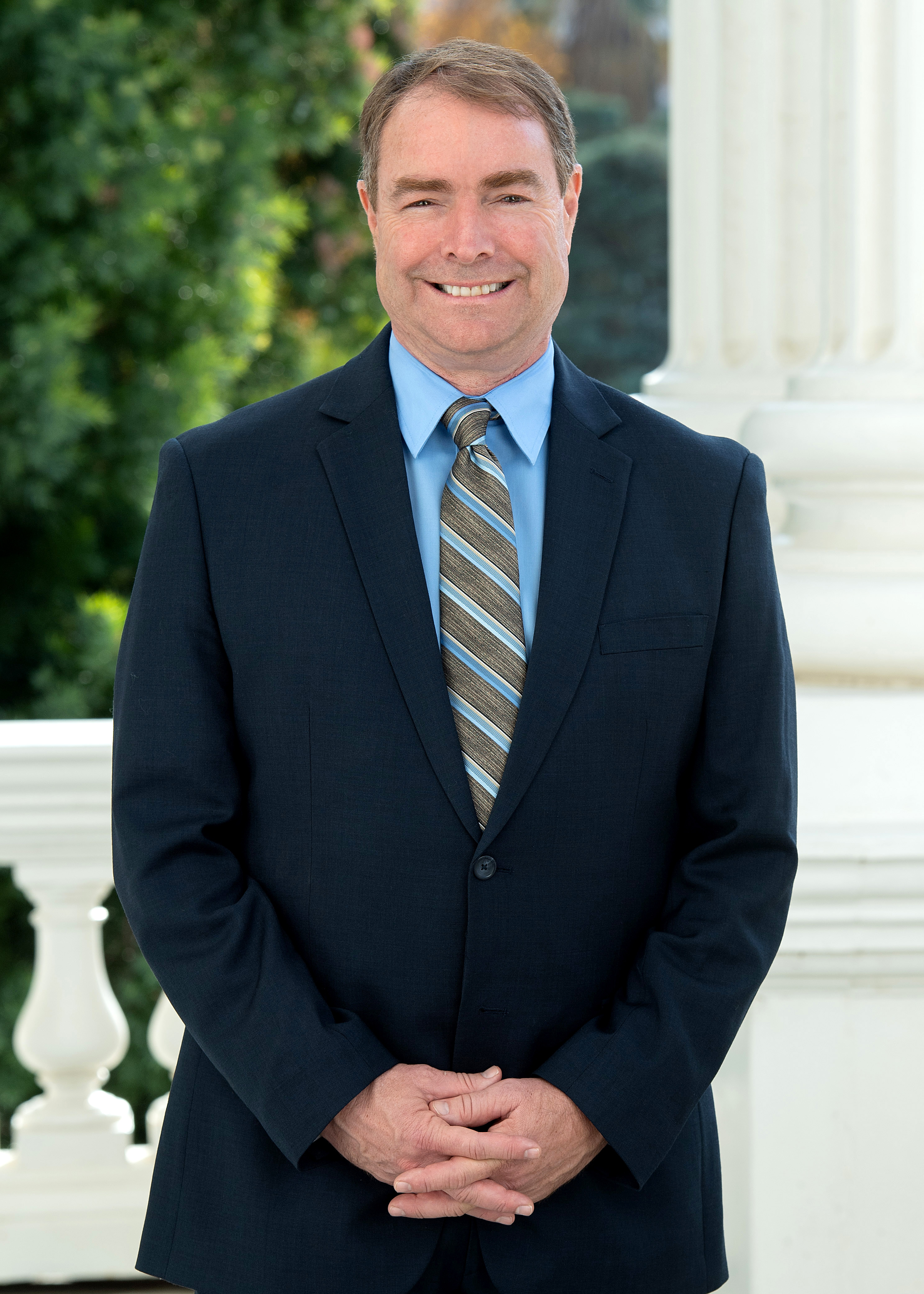
- Official portrait, 2022

Member-elect of the California State Senate from the 2nd district
- Assuming office December 7, 2026
- Succeeding: Mike McGuire

Member of the California State Assembly from the 12th district
- Incumbent
- Assumed office December 5, 2022
- Preceded by: Heath Flora (redistricted)
- Succeeded by: Jackie Elward

Member of the Marin County Board of Supervisors from the 1st district
- In office 2015–2022
- Preceded by: Susan L. Adams
- Succeeded by: Mary Sackett

Personal details
- Party: Democratic
- Spouse: Dawn Chipman
- Children: 2
- Education: University of California, Berkeley (BA, JD)

Damon Matthew Connolly (born June 19, 1963) is an American attorney and politician serving as a member of the California State Assembly for the 12th district. Elected in November 2022, he assumed office on December 5, 2022.

== Early life and education ==
Connolly was raised in the San Francisco Bay Area. He earned a Bachelor of Arts degree in economics from University of California, Berkeley and a Juris Doctor from the UC Berkeley School of Law.

== Career ==
From 1989 to 1993, Connolly worked as an associate at Thelen LLP in San Francisco. He then joined the California Department of Justice, serving as a deputy attorney general from 1993 to 1998 and as an supervising deputy attorney general from 1998 to 2007. In 2007 and 2008, he was a partner at Girard Gibbs LLP. Connolly served as a member of the San Rafael City Council from 2007 to 2014 and the Marin County Board of Supervisors from 2015 to 2022.

In October 2021, Connolly announced he would run for California State Assembly in the 12th district. Incumbent Marc Levine chose to run for California Insurance Commissioner. In June 2022, Connolly finished first in a field of five candidates in the jungle primary. He won the general election with 51.8% of the vote.

Connolly is a member of the California Legislative Progressive Caucus.

== Election history ==
=== Marin County Board of Supervisors ===
2018 Marin County Board of Supervisors 1st district election
Candidate	Votes	%
Damon Connolly (incumbent)	13,146	98.3
Write-in	231	1.7
Total votes	13,377	100.0

=== California State Assembly ===
2022 California State Assembly 12th district election
Primary election
Party	Candidate	Votes	%
Democratic	Damon Connolly	42,950	37.1
Democratic	Sara Aminzadeh	41,934	36.2
Democratic	Steve Schwartz	16,612	14.3
Democratic	Ida Times-Green	13,164	11.4
Republican	Andrew Alan Podshadley (write-in)	1,181	1.0
Total votes		115,841	100.0
General election
Democratic	Damon Connolly	92,287	51.8
Democratic	Sara Aminzadeh	85,900	48.2
Total votes		178,187	100.0
Democratic gain from Republican			

2024 California State Assembly 12th district election
Primary election
Party	Candidate	Votes	%
Democratic	Damon Connolly (incumbent)	111,490	77.5
Republican	Andrew Podshadley	17,335	12.0
Republican	Eryn Cervantes	15,121	10.5
Total votes		143,946	100.0
General election
Democratic	Damon Connolly (incumbent)	184,605	75.7
Republican	Andrew Podshadley	59,286	24.3
Total votes		243,891	100.0
Democratic hold			
