= William Biddick Jr. =

American politician

Member of the California State Assembly from the 12th district
- In office January 7, 1957 – January 2, 1961
- Preceded by: John J. McFall
- Succeeded by: Bob Monagan

Personal details
- Born: June 29, 1920 Stockton, California
- Died: July 3, 2012 (aged 92) Aptos, California
- Party: Democratic
- Spouse: Dorothy Thompson (m. 1949)
- Children: 5
- Education: Stanford Law School

Military service
- Branch/service: United States Navy
- Battles/wars: World War II

William Biddick Jr. (June 29, 1920 – July 3, 2012) served two terms in the California Assembly and during World War II he served in the United States Navy. Later, he served as a superior court judge in the San Joaquin Superior Court, after the retirement of Judge Marion Woodward. A graduate of Stanford Law School, he practiced law in Stockton, CA for 12 years, as a deputy district attorney and the Stockton City Attorney.

== Personal ==
Biddick married Dorothy Thompson. Together, they had five children.
