= Douglas F. Carter =

American politician (1944–2001)

Douglas Frank Carter

Member of the California State Assembly from the 12th district
- In office July 17, 1973 - December 2, 1974
- Preceded by: Bob Monagan
- Succeeded by: Kenneth A. Meade

Personal details
- Born: April 22, 1944 Toronto, Canada
- Died: March 27, 2001 (aged 56)
- Party: Republican

Douglas Frank Carter (April 22, 1944 - March 27, 2001) served in the California State Assembly during the 1970s. He was born in Canada.
