= Robert T. Monagan =

American politician (1920–2009)

Robert T. Monagan Jr.
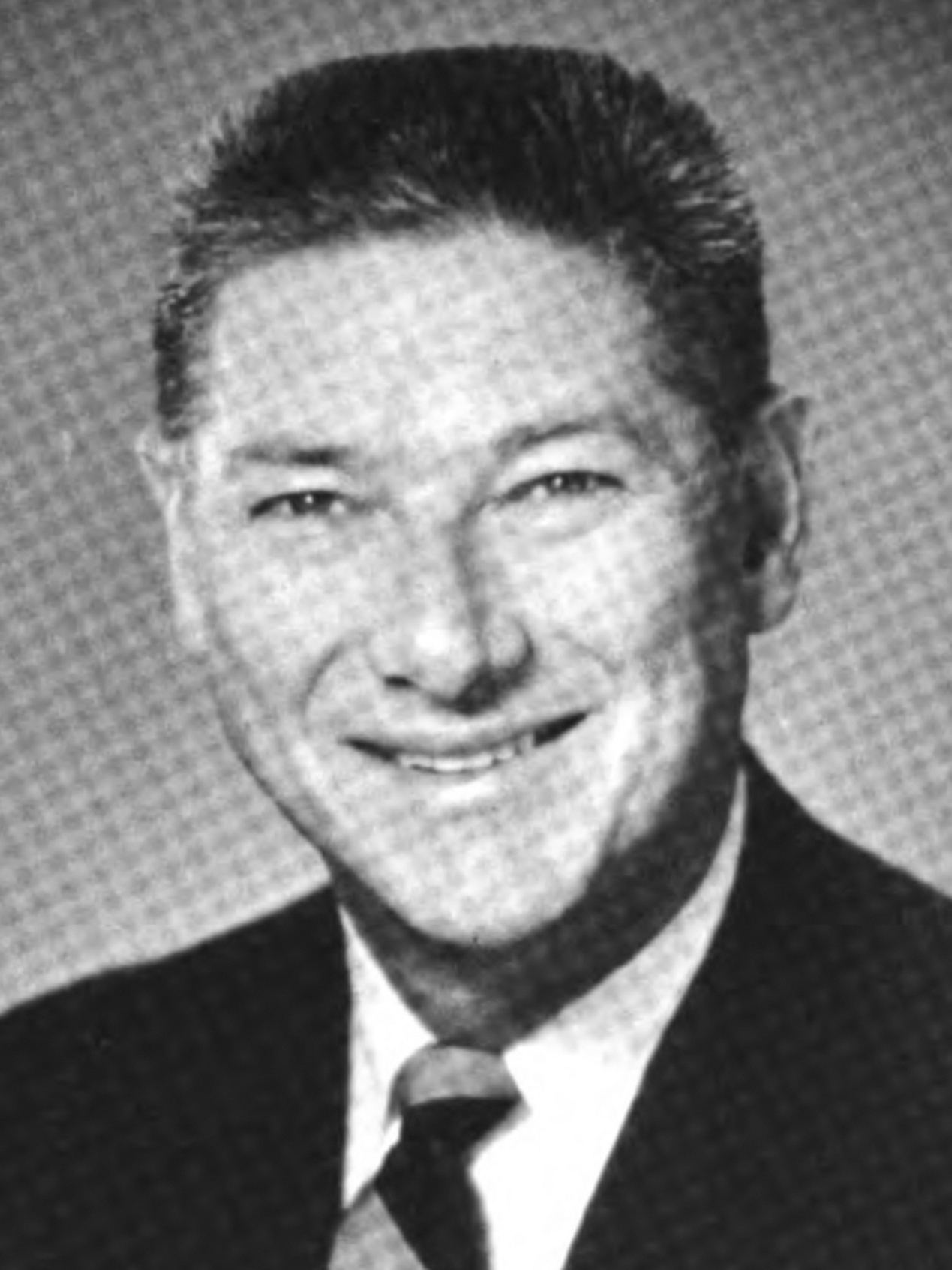
- Official portrait, 1971

United States Assistant Secretary of Transportation for Congressional and Intergovernmental Affairs
- In office 1973–1974
- President: Richard Nixon

Minority Leader of the California Assembly
- In office January 4, 1971 – January 5, 1973
- Preceded by: Jesse M. Unruh
- Succeeded by: Robert G. Beverly
- In office January 4, 1965 – September 20, 1968
- Preceded by: Charles J. Conrad
- Succeeded by: Jesse M. Unruh

55th Speaker of the California State Assembly
- In office January 6, 1969 – September 23, 1970
- Preceded by: Jesse M. Unruh
- Succeeded by: Bob Moretti

Member of the California State Assembly from the 12th district
- In office January 2, 1961 – April 9, 1973
- Preceded by: William Biddick Jr.
- Succeeded by: Douglas F. Carter

Mayor of Tracy
- In office April 1960 – December 31, 1960
- Preceded by: Henry James Buthmann
- Succeeded by: W. E. Brown

Personal details
- Born: Robert Timothy Monagan Jr. July 5, 1920 Ogden, Utah, U.S.
- Died: January 7, 2009 (aged 88) Sacramento, California, U.S.
- Party: Republican
- Spouse: Ione Angwin
- Children: 2
- Profession: Insurance, Real Estate

Robert Timothy Monagan Jr. (July 5, 1920 – January 7, 2009) was a California politician and a member of the Republican Party, who was Speaker of the California State Assembly from 1969 to 1970. He served in the California State Assembly, representing the 12th district from 1961 until 1973.

== Early life and career ==
Born in Ogden, Utah, Monagan grew up in Vallejo, California and earned his Bachelor of Science in Business Administration in 1942 from the College of the Pacific (later the University of the Pacific), where he played basketball and was student body president.

From 1943 to 1946, including during World War II, he served as a United States Coast Guard officer, seeing duty in the Aleutian Islands.

After the war, he returned to California to become the graduate manager of athletics for the University of the Pacific.

Monagan moved to Tracy, California in 1950 to be secretary-manager of the Tracy Chamber of Commerce.

== Political career ==
In 1952, he became chief of staff for Congressman Leroy Johnson in Washington, D.C. Monagan returned to Tracy in 1954 to begin working in insurance and real estate, eventually founding Monagan-Miller-McInerney Insurance, which eventually became the largest insurance agency in the region surrounding Tracy.

He was elected to the Tracy City Council in 1958 and became mayor in April 1960. That same year, he was elected for the California State Assembly to represent the 12th District, and resigned as mayor on December 31, 1960 to take his seat in the Assembly.

Monagan was re-elected to the Assembly five more times. He became Assembly Republican Leader in 1965 and held that post until becoming Speaker of the Assembly in 1969. After the 1970 elections, Monagan again became Assembly Republican Leader and held that post until becoming United States Assistant Secretary of Transportation in 1973, holding that position until 1974.

In 1974, Monagan returned to California to become vice president (and later president) of the California Manufacturers and Technology Association. In 1984, he left the CMTA to become president of the California Economic Development Corporation, serving until 1994.

A portion of I-205 which runs through Tracy is named after him.

Monagan served on the Board of Regents of the University of the Pacific from 1991 to April 2007, including nine years as Chairman, and the University's Monagan Hall is named for him and his wife. Monagan Hall is a student housing complex consisting of four-bedroom suites available only to juniors and seniors.

With his wife, Ione, he had one son, Michael and one daughter, Marilee.

== Books ==
The Disappearance of Representative Government: A California Solution (1990) ISBN 0-933994-10-9.

Political offices
Preceded by Jesse M. Unruh	Speaker of the California State Assembly; January 1969–September 1970	Succeeded by Bob Moretti
