= Thomas E. Caldecott =

American mayor (1878–1951)

- Born: July 27, 1878; Chester, England
- Died: July 23, 1951 (aged 72); Berkeley, California, United States
- Occupations: pharmacist, politician

Thomas Edwin Caldecott (July 27, 1878 – July 23, 1951) was a pharmacist and politician. From 1923, Caldecott served in politics in Alameda County, California in the San Francisco Bay Area until 1951. The Caldecott Tunnel which is a key highway link through the Berkeley Hills is named after him.

Caldecott was born in Chester, England on July 27, 1878. Both of his parents were Welsh. The family immigrated to Toronto, Ontario, Canada about 1882. Caldecott grew up in Canada, and obtained a pharmacy degree from the University of Toronto in 1900. Thomas and his brother visited Berkeley, California, and shortly thereafter in 1903, moved their entire family there. That same year, Caldecott bought a pharmacy at Dwight Way and Shattuck Avenue, later moved to Ashby Avenue and Adeline Street in the Webb Block, a building which was designated a local landmark in 2004.

In 1910, Caldecott married Australian-born nurse Eveline Grooms (1888–1977), who worked at Berkeley's Alta Bates Hospital. They had three children: Chester Edwin (1911–1984; an attorney), Thomas William (1914–1994; a judge and state assemblyman), and Elizabeth Fanny ("Betty") (1918–1983; an army nurse and lieutenant).

Caldecott was elected to the City Council of Berkeley in 1923. In 1930, he was appointed to fill out the remaining term of Mayor Michael B. Driver. He then successfully ran for the office of Mayor in 1931, serving until December 1932. He was then elected as a supervisor on the Alameda County Board of Supervisors, serving from 1933 until his death in 1951. He was chairman of the board in 1945–46. In 1948, he formed the Alameda County Highway Committee, "to solve sectional differences over highway problems." He was also instrumental in establishing a new Alameda County Juvenile Hall, which was completed after his death.

Caldecott served as the president of Joint Highway District 13, which oversaw the construction of the multi-bore Broadway Low Level Tunnel through the Berkeley Hills east of San Francisco Bay. When opened in 1937, it was the longest tunnel in the State of California, and accomplished the opening up of the entire region east of the hills as a major suburb of the Bay Area. At an event that year, Caldecott was honored "as the man responsible for the success of the project". In 1941, Caldecott was publicly commended for his "untiring efforts" in bringing the project to a successful completion. In 1960, the tunnel was re-named the "Caldecott Tunnel", in recognition of his leadership on the project.

Caldecott died of a heart attack at his Berkeley home on July 23, 1951.
