= Bob Moretti =

American politician (1936–1984)

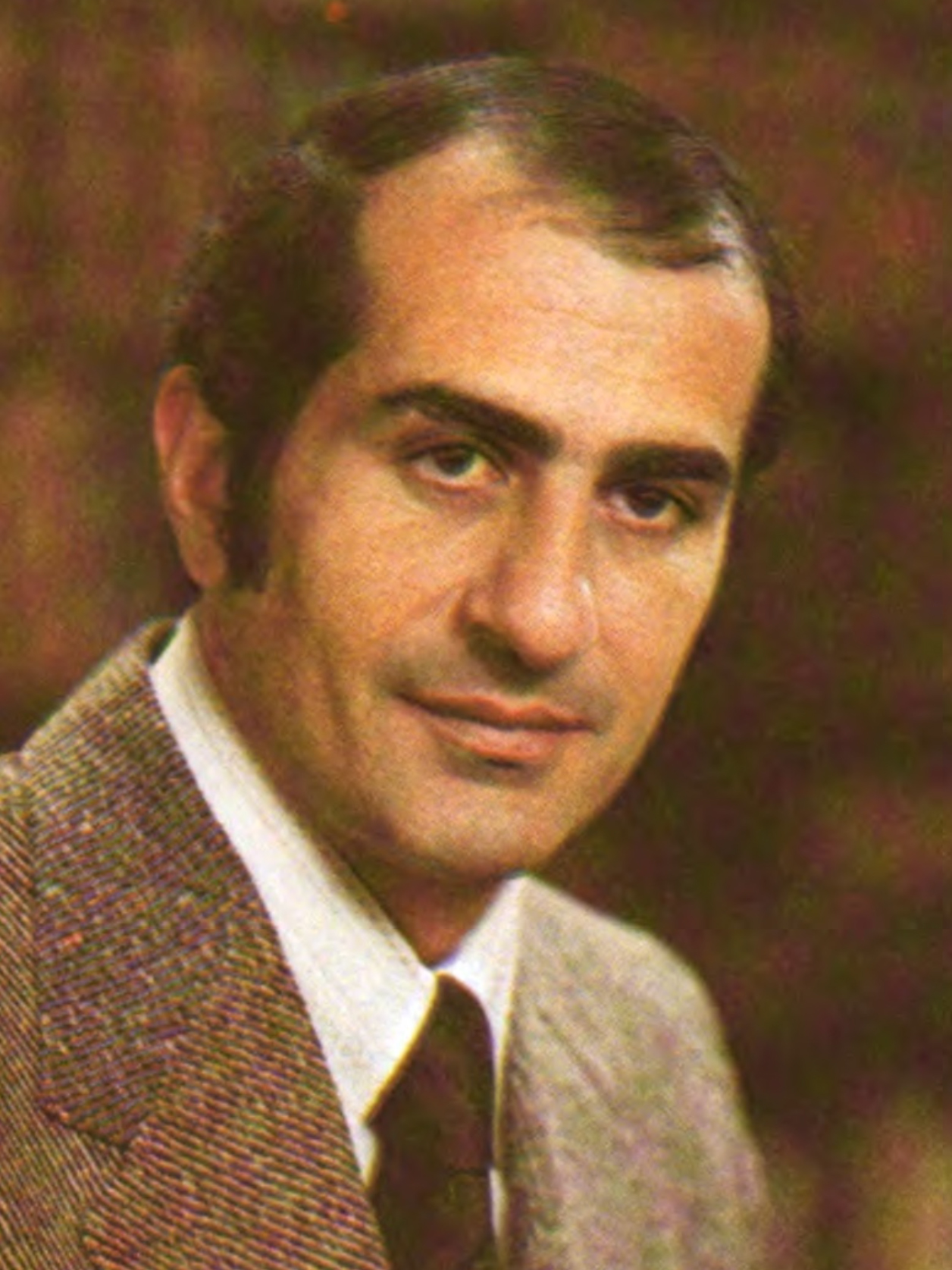
- Official portrait, 1971

56th Speaker of the California State Assembly
- In office January 4, 1971 – June 5, 1974
- Preceded by: Robert T. Monagan
- Succeeded by: Leo T. McCarthy

Member of the California State Assembly from the 42nd district
- In office January 4, 1965 – November 30, 1974
- Preceded by: Tom Bane
- Succeeded by: Frank D. Lanterman

Personal details
- Born: Robert Moretti; June 3, 1936 Detroit, Michigan, U.S.
- Died: May 12, 1984 (aged 47) Sacramento, California, U.S.
- Party: Democratic
- Spouse: Marilyn Ann Stotko (m. 1958)
- Children: 5

Robert Moretti (June 3, 1936 – May 12, 1984) was an American politician. A Democrat, Moretti served as Speaker of the California State Assembly from 1971 to 1974.

== Life and career ==
Born in Detroit, Michigan in 1936 to Marino and Mary Moretti, his family later relocated to Los Angeles when Moretti was a teenager. Moretti's father was born in Ovindoli, Italy, and his mother was of Armenian descent. Moretti graduated from Notre Dame High School in Sherman Oaks, California in 1954 and went on to earn an accounting degree from the University of Notre Dame in 1958.

=== Political career ===
Moretti was first elected to the California State Assembly in 1964 at the age of 28, making him the youngest member of the Assembly at that time. In the Assembly, Moretti represented Van Nuys. In 1970, he chaired the Assembly's Democratic Campaign Committee.

Seen as a protege of Assembly Speaker Jesse Unruh, Moretti was first elected Speaker in 1971 and quickly emerged as a staunch opponent of Republican Governor Ronald Reagan. Moretti's initial resistance to Reagan, however, gave way some cooperation, particularly on the issue of welfare costs. Seeking to reach a deal, Moretti purportedly told Reagan, "I don't like you particularly and I know you don't like me but we don't have to be in love to work together." Moretti and Reagan eventually developed a sense of mutual respect that culminated in the 1971 California Welfare Reform Act.

In 1973, Moretti emerged as a leading figure in the successful campaign to defeat Reagan's Proposition 1, a ballot initiative to set state spending and taxes using formulas. Seen as a vehicle to enhance Reagan's national profile ahead of a possible run for president, Moretti and other opponents argued the proposition would force drastic cuts in state services and force local governments to raise property taxes.

In 1974, Moretti was a candidate for the office of Governor of California but was defeated in the Democratic primary by Jerry Brown, who went on to win the general election.

== Death ==
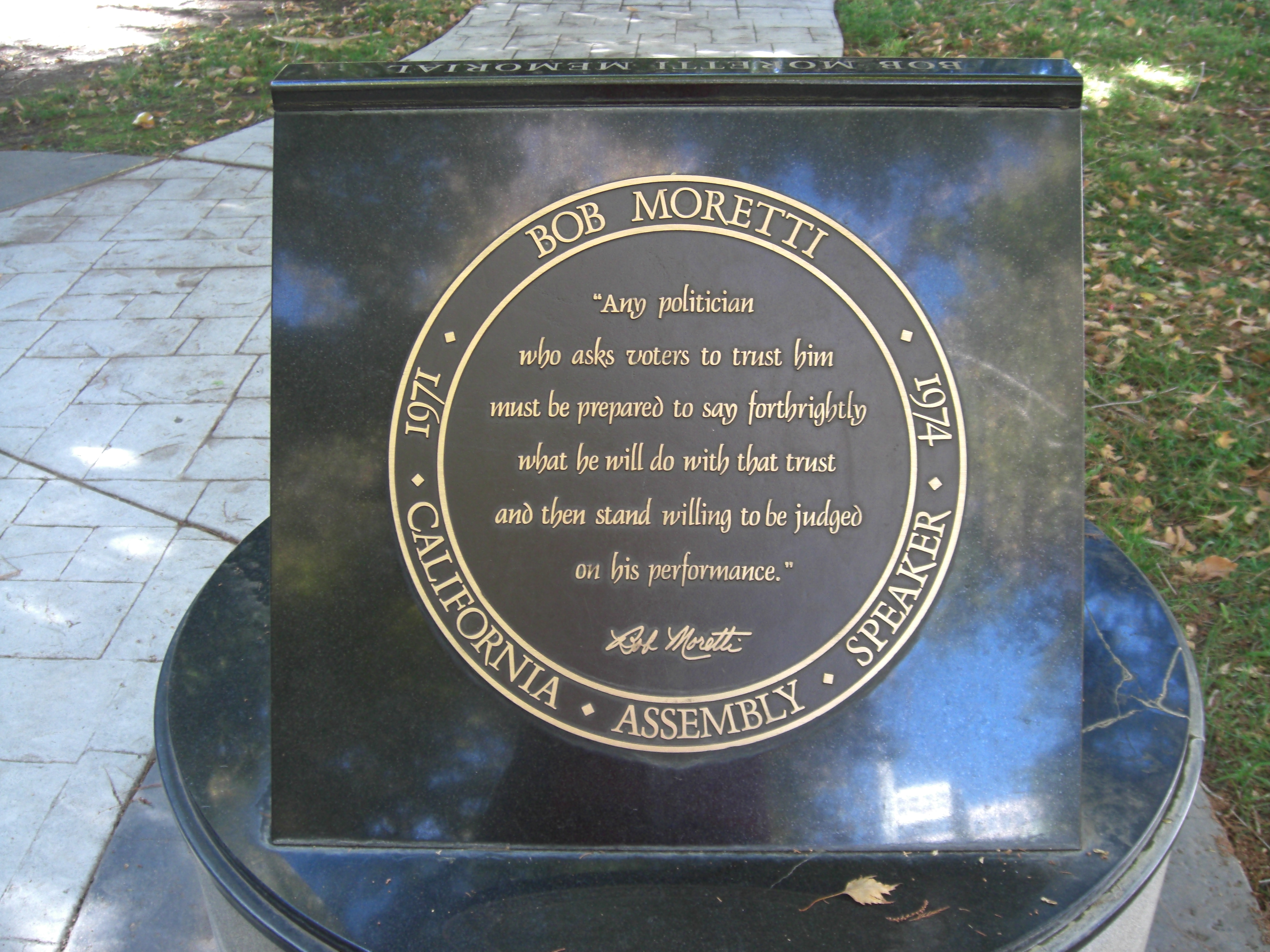
Bob Moretti memorial, Sacramento, Capitol Park

Moretti died of a heart attack while playing tennis in 1984 at the age of 47.

Political offices
Preceded by Robert T. Monagan	Speaker of the California State Assembly; January 1971–June 1974	Succeeded by Leo T. McCarthy
