= Thomas W. Caldecott =

American politician

Justice of the California Court of Appeal for the First District, Division Three
- In office 1969–1984
- Preceded by: Byrl Salsman
- Succeeded by: Carl W. Anderson

Member of the California State Assembly from the 18th district
- In office January 6, 1947 – September 26, 1957
- Preceded by: Gardiner Johnson
- Succeeded by: Don Mulford

Chairman of the California Republican Party
- In office 1954–1956
- Preceded by: Laughlin Edward Waters Sr.
- Succeeded by: Alphonzo E. Bell Jr.

Personal details
- Born: October 21, 1914 Berkeley, California
- Died: May 6, 1994 (aged 79) Walnut Creek, California
- Party: Republican
- Spouse: Rosalie
- Parent: Thomas E. Caldecott (father)
- Education: University of California, Berkeley (B.A., J.D.)

Military service
- Branch/service: United States Army
- Battles/wars: World War II

Thomas William Caldecott (October 21, 1914 – May 6, 1994) was an American judge and Republican Party politician in California.

Born in Berkeley, California, Caldecott was the son of Eveline Grooms Caldecott and Thomas Edwin Caldecott, who went on to serve on the City Council, as Mayor, and on the Alameda County Board of Supervisors before becoming the namesake of the Caldecott Tunnel. The younger Caldecott attended public schools in Berkeley and went on to the University of California, Berkeley, where he earned his Bachelor of Arts and Juris Doctor. After law school, he worked for Attorney General Earl Warren and then served in the United States Army during World War II.

In 1946, Caldecott was elected to the California State Assembly. In 1949, he became Chairman of the Assembly Civil Service and State Personnel Committee. He became Chairman of the Assembly Judiciary Committee in 1953 and then the Assembly Ways and Means Committee later that same year. While still serving in the Assembly, Caldecott also served as Chairman of the California Republican Party from 1954 to 1956. He resigned from the State Assembly in 1957 when Governor Goodwin Knight appointed him a Judge of the Alameda County Superior Court.

He left the Superior Court in 1968 to become Chief Legislative Secretary to Governor Ronald Reagan. In 1969, Reagan appointed Caldecott as an associate justice of the California First District Court of Appeal, Division Three, where he eventually became Presiding Justice. In 1975, Chief Justice Donald Wright appointed Caldecott to the Judicial Council of California where he served until 1979 as a representative of the courts. He retired from the Court of Appeal in 1984.

Caldecott died of cancer on May 6, 1994, at John Muir Medical Center in Walnut Creek, California.
