= California's 12th State Assembly district =

American legislative district

Current assemblymember
Damon Connolly; D–San Rafael
- Population (2020): 486,148
- Demographics: 61.56% White; 2.02% Black; 23.89% Latino; 5.92% Asian; 0.36% Native American; 0.25% Hawaiian/Pacific Islander; 0.70% other; 5.26% remainder of multiracial

California's 12th State Assembly district is one of 80 California State Assembly districts. It is currently represented by Democrat Damon Connolly of San Rafael.

== District profile ==
The district has the Sonoma Valley to its north and the San Francisco Bay to its south.

All of Marin County

- San Rafael
- Novato
- Mill Valley
- Larkspur
- San Anselmo
- Corte Madera
- Tiburon
- Fairfax

Sonoma County – (45.79%)

- Cotati
- Petaluma
- Rohnert Park
- Santa Rosa – (35.31)

== Election results from statewide races ==
Year	Office	Results
2022	Governor	Newsom 75.9 – 24.1%
2022	Senator	Padilla 77.5 – 22.5%
2021	Recall	Yes 58.1 - 41.9%
2021	Recall	Elder 59.7 - 6.6%
2020	President	Trump 52.5- 45.3%
2018	Governor	Cox 56.1 – 43.9%
2018	Senator	De Leon 59.0 – 41.0%
2016	President	Trump 51.1 – 43.1%
2016	Senator	Harris 59.2 – 40.8%
2014	Governor	Kashkari 53.0 – 47.0%
2012	President	Romney 52.4 – 45.1%
2012	Senator	Emken 53.2 – 46.8%

== List of assembly members representing the district ==
Due to redistricting, the 12th district has been moved around different parts of the state. The current iteration resulted from the 2021 redistricting by the California Citizens Redistricting Commission.

Assembly members	Party	Years served	Counties represented	Notes
E. W. Britt	Democratic	January 5, 1885 – January 3, 1887	Lake	
L. H. Gruwell	Democratic	January 3, 1887 – January 7, 1889	Lake	
C. M. Crawford	Democratic	January 7, 1889 – January 5, 1891	Lake	
James H. Renfro	Democratic	January 5, 1891 – May 20, 1892	Lake	Died in office. Died after being kicked in the head by a horse on his ranch.
Richard I. Thomas	Republican	January 2, 1893 – January 4, 1897	Nevada	
William Siles Robinson	Republican	January 4, 1897 – January 1, 1901	Nevada	
Frank M. Rutherford	Republican	January 1, 1901 – January 5, 1903	Nevada	
Benjamin F. Howard	Democratic	January 5, 1903 – January 2, 1905	Colusa, Glenn, Lake	
Ernest Weyand	Republican	January 2, 1905 – January 7, 1907	Colusa, Glenn, Lake	
F. H. Smythe	Democratic	January 7, 1907 – January 4, 1909	Colusa, Glenn, Lake	
John L. Mendenhall	Democratic	January 4, 1909 – January 6, 1913	Colusa, Glenn, Lake	
G. W. Libby	Democratic	January 6, 1913 – January 4, 1915	Sonoma	
Knox Boude	Republican	January 4, 1915 – January 8, 1917	Sonoma	
Lyman Green	Republican	January 8, 1917 – January 6, 1919	Sonoma	
A. F. Stevens	Republican	January 6, 1919 – January 8, 1923	Sonoma	
Emmett I. Donohue	Republican	January 8, 1923 – January 5, 1925	Sonoma	
Hubert B. Scudder	Republican	January 5, 1925 – January 5, 1931	Sonoma	
Percy G. West	Republican	January 5, 1931 – January 2, 1933	Sacramento	
James E. Thorp	Republican	January 2, 1933 – January 27, 1948	San Joaquin	Died in office from heart condition.
Vacant		January 27, 1948 – January 3, 1949	San Joaquin	
Verne W. Hoffman	Republican	January 3, 1949 – January 8, 1951	San Joaquin	
John J. McFall	Democratic	January 8, 1951 – January 3, 1957	San Joaquin	
William Biddick Jr.	Democratic	January 7, 1957 – January 2, 1961	San Joaquin	
Bob Monagan	Republican	January 2, 1961 – April 9, 1973	San Joaquin	Resigned from the California State Assembly.
Vacant		April 9, 1973 – July 17, 1973	San Joaquin	
Douglas F. Carter	Republican	July 17, 1973 – November 30, 1974	San Joaquin	Was sworn in after winning a special election to replace the vacant seat of Bob Monagan.
Kenneth A. Meade	Democratic	December 2, 1974 – November 30, 1976	Alameda, Contra Costa	
Tom Bates	Democratic	December 6, 1976 – November 30, 1992	Alameda, Contra Costa	
John Burton	Democratic	December 7, 1992 – November 30, 1996	San Francisco	
Kevin Shelley	Democratic	December 2, 1996 – November 30, 2002	San Francisco, San Mateo	
Leland Yee	Democratic	December 2, 2002 – November 30, 2006	San Francisco, San Mateo	
Fiona Ma	Democratic	December 4, 2006 – November 30, 2012	San Francisco, San Mateo	
Kristin Olsen	Republican	December 3, 2012 – November 30, 2016	San Joaquin, Stanislaus	
Heath Flora	Republican	December 5, 2016 – November 30, 2022	San Joaquin, Stanislaus	
Damon Connolly	Democratic	December 5, 2022 – present	Marin, Sonoma	

== Election results (1990–present) ==
=== 2024 ===
2024 California State Assembly 12th district election
Primary election
Party	Candidate	Votes	%
Democratic	Damon Connolly (incumbent)	111,490	77.5
Republican	Andrew Podshadley	17,335	12.0
Republican	Eryn Cervantes	15,121	10.5
Total votes		143,946	100.0
General election
Democratic	Damon Connolly (incumbent)	184,605	75.7
Republican	Andrew Podshadley	59,286	24.3
Total votes		243,891	100.0
Democratic hold			

=== 2022 ===
2022 California State Assembly 12th district election
Primary election
Party	Candidate	Votes	%
Democratic	Damon Connolly	42,950	37.1
Democratic	Sara Aminzadeh	41,934	36.2
Democratic	Steve Schwartz	16,612	14.3
Democratic	Ida Times-Green	13,164	11.4
Republican	Andrew Podshadley (write-in)	1,181	1.0
Total votes		115,841	100.0
General election
Democratic	Damon Connolly	92,287	51.8
Democratic	Sara Aminzade	85,900	48.2
Total votes		21,599	100.0
Democratic gain from Republican			

=== 2020 ===
2020 California State Assembly 12th district election
Primary election
Party	Candidate	Votes	%
Republican	Heath Flora (incumbent)	71,098	62.9
Democratic	Paul Akinjo	41,859	37.1
Total votes		112,957	100.0
General election
Republican	Heath Flora (incumbent)	131,625	60.9
Democratic	Paul Akinjo	84,373	39.1
Total votes		215,998	100.0
Republican hold			

=== 2018 ===
2018 California State Assembly 12th district election
Primary election
Party	Candidate	Votes	%
Republican	Heath Flora (incumbent)	56,212	63.9
Democratic	Robert D. Chase	31,811	36.1
Total votes		88,023	100.0
General election
Republican	Heath Flora (incumbent)	94,404	60.0
Democratic	Robert D. Chase	62,811	40.0
Total votes		157,215	100.0
Republican hold			

=== 2016 ===
2016 California State Assembly 12th district election
Primary election
Party	Candidate	Votes	%
Republican	Ken Vogel	23,678	25.6
Republican	Heath Flora	21,484	23.2
Democratic	Virginia Madueno	19,764	21.4
Democratic	Harinder Grewal	17,245	18.6
Republican	Cindy Marks	10,397	11.2
Total votes		92,568	100.0
General election
Republican	Heath Flora	81,680	52.3
Republican	Ken Vogel	74,433	47.7
Total votes		156,113	100.0
Republican hold			

=== 2014 ===
2014 California State Assembly 12th district election
Primary election
Party	Candidate	Votes	%
Republican	Kristin Olsen (incumbent)	38,892	67.5
Democratic	Harinder Grewal	18,742	32.5
Total votes		57,634	100.0
General election
Republican	Kristin Olsen (incumbent)	63,003	67.2
Democratic	Harinder Grewal	30,752	32.8
Total votes		93,755	100.0
Republican hold			

=== 2012 ===
2012 California State Assembly 12th district election
Primary election
Party	Candidate	Votes	%
Republican	Kristin Olsen (incumbent)	44,209	65.0
Democratic	Christopher Mateo	23,782	35.0
Total votes		67,991	100.0
General election
Republican	Kristin Olsen (incumbent)	89,821	60.6
Democratic	Christopher Mateo	58,517	39.4
Total votes		148,338	100.0
Republican gain from Democratic			

=== 2010 ===
2010 California State Assembly 12th district election
Party	Candidate	Votes	%
Democratic	Fiona Ma (incumbent)	90,388	80.8
Republican	Alfonso Faustino	21,540	19.2
Total votes		111,928	100.0
Democratic hold			

=== 2008 ===
2008 California State Assembly 12th district election
Party	Candidate	Votes	%
Democratic	Fiona Ma (incumbent)	131,231	83.3
Republican	Conchita Applegate	26,380	16.7
Total votes		157,611	100.0
Democratic hold			

=== 2006 ===
2006 California State Assembly 12th district election
Party	Candidate	Votes	%
Democratic	Fiona Ma	73,922	71.0
Republican	Howard Epstein	17,020	16.3
Green	Barry Hermanson	13,174	12.7
Total votes		104,116	100.0
Democratic hold			

=== 2004 ===
2004 California State Assembly 12th district election
Party	Candidate	Votes	%
Democratic	Leland Yee (incumbent)	112,000	77.6
Republican	Howard Epstein	23,803	16.5
Libertarian	Chris Maden	8,560	5.9
Total votes		144,363	100.0
Democratic hold			

=== 2002 ===
2002 California State Assembly 12th district election
Party	Candidate	Votes	%
Democratic	Leland Yee	72,166	77.8
Republican	Howard Epstein	14,699	15.8
Libertarian	Michael Denny	5,985	6.4
Total votes		92,850	100.0
Democratic hold			

=== 2000 ===
2000 California State Assembly 12th district election
Party	Candidate	Votes	%
Democratic	Kevin Shelley (incumbent)	110,644	82.2
Republican	Howard Epstein	23,905	17.8
Total votes		134,549	100.0
Democratic hold			

=== 1998 ===
1998 California State Assembly 12th district election
Party	Candidate	Votes	%
Democratic	Kevin Shelley (incumbent)	80,962	80.5
Republican	Howard Epstein	19,615	19.5
Total votes		100,577	100.0
Democratic hold			

=== 1996 ===
1996 California State Assembly 12th district election
Party	Candidate	Votes	%
Democratic	Kevin Shelley (incumbent)	94,167	78.0
Republican	Torence Faulkner	26,595	22.0
Total votes		120,762	100.0
Democratic hold			

=== 1994 ===
1994 California State Assembly 12th district election
Party	Candidate	Votes	%
Democratic	John L. Burton (incumbent)	71,371	70.8
Republican	Philip Louis Wing	24,459	24.3
Libertarian	Anton Sherwood	5,014	5.0
Total votes		100,844	100.0
Democratic hold			

=== 1992 ===
1992 California State Assembly 12th district election
Party	Candidate	Votes	%
Democratic	John L. Burton (incumbent)	84,924	65.1
Republican	Storm Jenkins	34,104	26.1
Peace and Freedom	Kitty Reese	8,212	6.3
Libertarian	Anton Sherwood	3,221	2.5
Total votes		130,461	100.0
Democratic hold			

=== 1990 ===
1990 California State Assembly 12th district election
Party	Candidate	Votes	%
Democratic	Tom Bates (incumbent)	82,766	67.7
Republican	Jonathan Grear	31,853	26.1
Peace and Freedom	Marsha Feinland	7,605	6.2
Total votes		122,224	100.0
Democratic hold			

== See also ==
- California State Assembly
- California State Assembly districts
- Districts in California
