= Bill Shearer =

American attorney and political activist

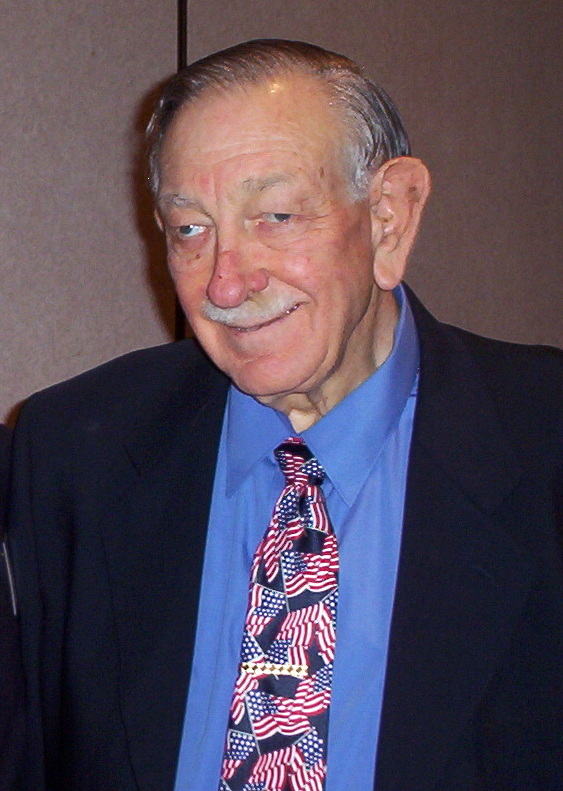
- Shearer in 2006
- Born: January 21, 1931; Marysville, California, U.S.
- Died: March 3, 2007 (aged 76); San Diego, California, U.S.
- Education: San Diego State College
- Known for: Founder of the American Independent Party

William Kennedy Shearer (January 21, 1931 – March 3, 2007) was an American attorney and political activist who founded the American Independent Party. Shearer went on to lead the party for most of his life. He was active in minor party ballot access issues in California.

== Early life and education ==
William K. Shearer was born in Marysville, California on January 21, 1931, and graduated from Grossmont High School and San Diego State College.

== Career ==
Shearer served in the U.S. Army during the Korean War and worked on the staff of United States Representative James B. Utt and, later, for Assemblyman E. Richard Barnes. In 1957, Shearer was hired as executive director of the Central Committee of the Republican Party of San Diego County, California.

Running as a Republican, Shearer unsuccessfully stood for election to the California Assembly from California's 77th State Assembly district in 1952, 1956 and 1958, before founding and publishing the monthly conservative newspaper The California Statesman. He later became an organizer of the Citizens' Councils in California.

Between his political activism, Shearer worked as an attorney, growing a successful, 70-person law firm in San Diego.

=== American Independent Party ===
In 1967, Shearer was hired by the George Wallace 1968 presidential campaign to help establish the American Independent Party (AIP) as a vehicle for Wallace's political ambitions. Shearer went on to co-found the AIP that year in California with his wife, Eileen Knowland Shearer, with the party rapidly consolidating minor parties in other states under the umbrella of a National Committee of Autonomous State Parties to provide Wallace with cross-country ballot lines. (Note: Eileen Knowland Shearer was a cousin of United States Senator William F. Knowland.) The decision by Wallace to start organizing his campaign in California has never been entirely explained. (Note: According to Shearer, the decision to move for party recognition first in California before any other state was because California presented "greater mechanical difficulties" for the organization of new political parties than other jurisdictions.) Because the Wallace campaign had no West Coast contacts, Wallace aide Seymore Trammell called Bill Simmons – a leader of the Citizens' Council of Jackson, Mississippi – for a recommendation for someone in California. Simmons advised the campaign to retain Shearer. Wallace went on to win 46 votes in the United States Electoral College; as of 2023, he was the last minor party candidate to win electoral votes in a U.S. presidential election. (Note: The AIP ultimately established itself as the largest third party in California with the Los Angeles Times reporting, in 2016, that it was "bigger than all of California's other minor parties combined", while also noting that the AIP's large affiliation numbers were probably because many people accidentally registered their affiliation with the AIP thinking they were registering as "independent".)

After the 1968 election, Shearer continued to lead the American Independent Party and was its candidate for Governor of California in 1970. A long-simmering dispute between Wallace and Shearer led to a 1973 split in the party, with it bifurcating into the American Independent Party and the American Party, Shearer continuing to lead the former. In 1976, the New York Times characterized the AIP as "a party that is practically his [Shearer's] own".

Shearer subsequently led the AIP into becoming the California state affiliate of the Populist Party, from which it later withdrew, and then the Constitution Party.

=== Political views ===
In 1951, as a university student, Shearer was the subject of a profile in the San Diego newsweekly Point Magazine which described his support for readoption of the gold standard and his opposition to United States foreign policy as having "all the earmarks of a zealot". Addressing the matter of segregation, in 1967 Shearer stated that he was "not an avowed segregationist, but I do favor a pattern of life which has some degree of segregation". In 1970, Shearer called for the fairness doctrine to be extended to newspapers and for limits to be placed on political campaign spending. During his life, Shearer advocated for ballot access for minor parties and candidates from a variety of political orientations. In 1973, for instance, he submitted an affidavit in support of the Socialist Workers Party in Socialist Workers Party v Eu.

Shearer kept framed photos of the Mexican revolutionary Emiliano Zapata in both his office and his home. According to Eileen Shearer, Zapata was one of Bill Shearer's heroes.

== Personal life ==
Shearer had a daughter who served as the AIP's chair from 2004 to 2006, and several stepchildren. He died on March 3, 2007, in San Diego at the age of 76.
