= Ricardo Romo (academic) =

- Born: 1943 (age 82–83)
- Education: University of Texas, Austin (BA); Loyola Marymount University (MA); University of California, Los Angeles (PhD)

Ricardo Romo is an American urban historian who served as the fifth President of the University of Texas at San Antonio (UTSA) from May 1999 to March 2017.

== Early life ==
A native of San Antonio's Westside, Romo graduated from Fox Tech High School and attended the University of Texas at Austin on a track scholarship, where he was a member of the Texas Cowboys and Lambda Chi Alpha.

He holds a master's degree in history from Loyola Marymount University and a Ph.D. in history from UCLA. Romo is an urban historian and the author of "East Los Angeles: History of a Barrio".

== Early academic career ==
From 1987 to 1993, Romo directed the Texas office of the Tomas Rivera Center, housed at Trinity University, where he evaluated the impact of governmental policies on Latinos. In 2002, George W. Bush appointed him to the President's Board of Advisers on Historically Black Colleges and Universities. In 2004, former Secretary of State Colin Powell appointed Romo as a U.S. representative to the United Nations Educational Scientific and Cultural Organization. In 2005 Romo was appointed to the Board of Directors of the Federal Reserve Bank of Dallas, San Antonio branch.

== UTSA presidency ==
Romo implemented "The UTSA Plan: A Roadmap to Excellence". The plan is a strategic effort to enhance both access to education and excellence in scholarship and service at UTSA.

In October 2008, he received the Distinguished Alumnus Award from the Texas Exes Alumni Association.

In the 2014-2015 academic year, Romo received a total compensation from UTSA in the amount of $530,704. The San Antonio Express-News questions details about the president's resignation: "The public may never be privy to the circumstances that prompted ... Romo to be placed on paid leave. Personnel issues are not subject to open records and disclosure laws. Details of such investigations become public only if lawsuits are filed ...", and suits are not anticipated in this case.

== Controversy ==
On February 14, 2017, Romo was placed on administrative leave pending an investigation into his conduct regarding how he greeted women in his office. Romo had planned to retire in August 2017 after almost two decades with the university. He announced his resignation, effective immediately, on March 3, 2017. "I have been made aware that the manner in which I embraced women made them uncomfortable and was inappropriate," he said. Bexar County Judge Nelson Wolff claimed that the University of Texas System had mishandled the investigation into his friend's conduct. Wolff said that he often embraces men and women in the workplace: "It's a tradition in the Hispanic community that you do that... It's just a tradition, one that I participate in." When the UT System's investigation was closed on March 3, the report’s executive summary stated, "The information gained in the probe supports the conclusion that President Romo engaged in sexual harassment and sexual misconduct against the victims..."

== Personal life ==
Romo is married and has two children.

Romos is an art collector. His collection includes works by Luis Jimenez, Carmen Lomas Garza, Cesar Martinez and Vincent Valdez, as well as print suites from Self Help Graphics and Coronado Studio. He has donated many prints from his collection to the Benson Latin American Collection.
