= Jesse M. Unruh =

American politician (1922–1987)

Jesse Unruh
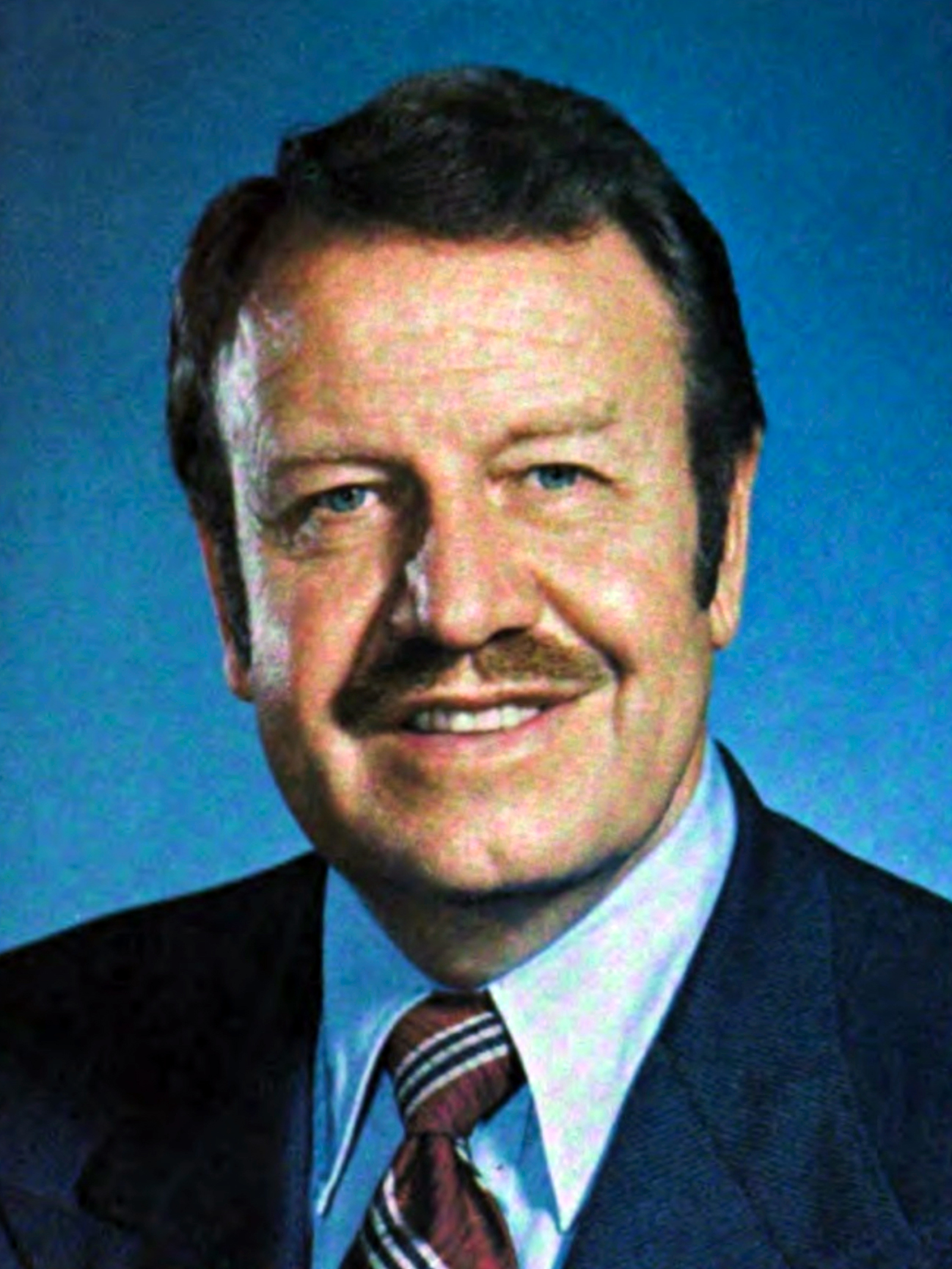
- Official portrait, 1975

26th Treasurer of California
- In office January 6, 1975 – August 4, 1987
- Governor: Jerry Brown; George Deukmejian
- Preceded by: Ivy Baker Priest
- Succeeded by: Elizabeth Whitney

Minority Leader of the California Assembly
- In office January 1969 – September 1970
- Preceded by: Robert T. Monagan
- Succeeded by: Robert T. Monagan

54th Speaker of the California State Assembly
- In office September 19, 1961 – January 6, 1969
- Preceded by: Ralph M. Brown
- Succeeded by: Robert T. Monagan

Member of the California State Assembly from the 65th district
- In office January 3, 1955 – January 4, 1971
- Preceded by: John W. Evans
- Succeeded by: David C. Pierson

Personal details
- Born: Jesse Marvin Unruh; September 30, 1922 Newton, Kansas, U.S.
- Died: August 4, 1987 (aged 64) Marina Del Rey, California, U.S.
- Party: Democratic
- Spouses: Virginia June Lemon (m. 1943; div. 1975) Chris Edwards (m. 1986)
- Children: 5
- Education: University of Southern California (BA)

Military service
- Allegiance: United States
- Branch/service: United States Navy
- Battles/wars: World War II

Jesse Marvin Unruh (/ˈʌnru/ UN-roo; September 30, 1922 – August 4, 1987), was an American politician who served as speaker of the California State Assembly and as the California state treasurer. He was a liberal Democrat.

== Early life and education ==
Born September 30, 1922, in Newton, Kansas, Unruh served in the United States Navy during World War II. After the war, he enrolled at the University of Southern California, receiving a Bachelor of Arts degree in political science and journalism in 1948.

== Career ==
=== California Assembly ===
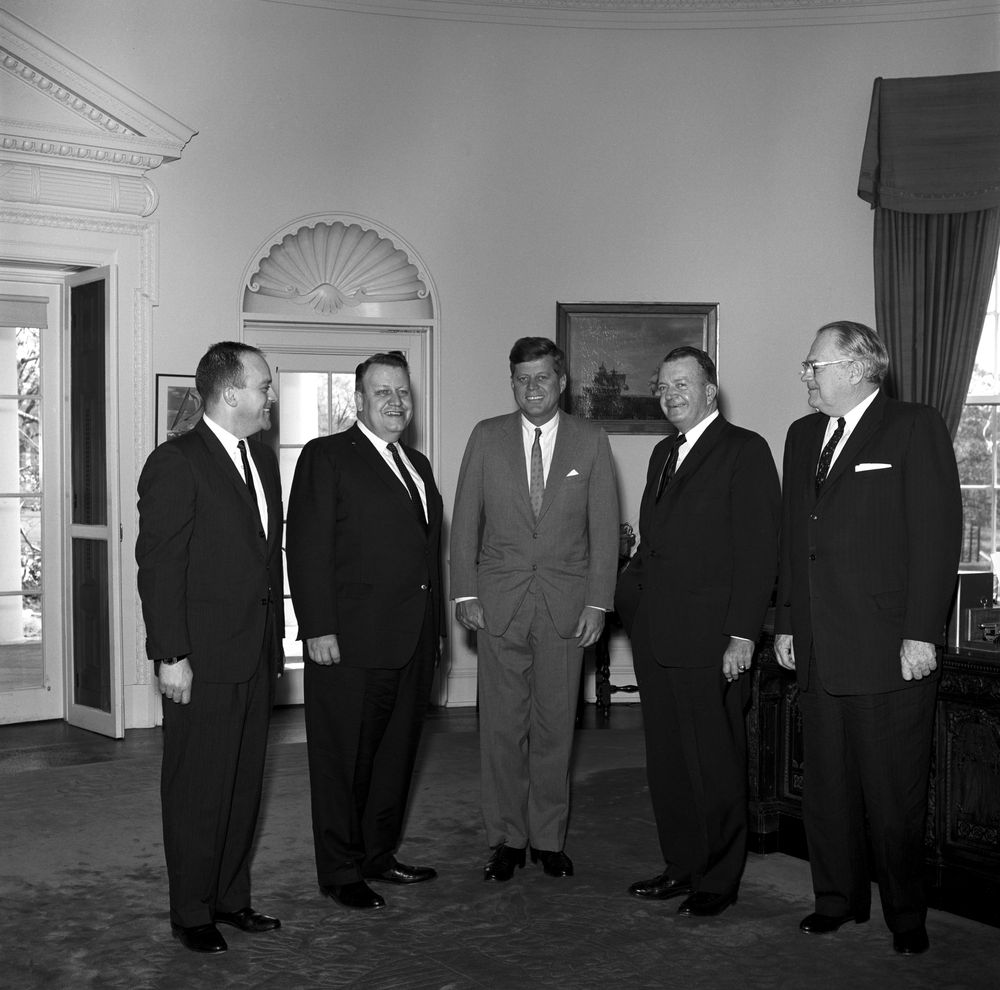
President John F. Kennedy meets with California state legislators. Left to right: Chairman of the California Assembly Committee on Ways and Means, Robert W. Crown; California State Assembly Speaker, Jesse Unruh; President Kennedy; Chairman of the California Senate Finance Committee, George Miller, Jr.; and President Pro Tempore of the California State Senate, Hugh M. Burns. Oval Office, White House, Washington, D.C.

Unruh's political career began as an unsuccessful candidate for the California State Assembly in 1950 and 1952. He was elected as a member of the Assembly on his third attempt in 1954. In 1956, he was an unsuccessful candidate for a Democratic presidential elector for California. In 1959, he wrote California's Unruh Civil Rights Act, which outlawed discrimination by businesses that offer services to the public and was a model for later reforms enacted nationally in the 1960s and 1970s. Unruh was Speaker of the California State Assembly from 1961 to 1969 and a delegate to Democratic National Convention from California in 1960 and 1968.

While serving as speaker of the California Assembly in the 1960s, Unruh used, according to one observer, “his political clout to stretch budget appropriations for education, to push through social legislation to better the plight of the poor, and to reorganize California's Legislature into a full-time professional institution.”

=== Campaign work ===
As a national official of the Democratic Party, he often feuded with Governor of California Pat Brown (1959–1967), a fellow Democrat, and was a case-study of James Q. Wilson's treatise on machine politics, The Amateur Democrat.

Unruh was a California campaign manager for John F. Kennedy in 1960 and a close Kennedy associate throughout his presidency. He helped convince Senator Robert F. Kennedy to enter the 1968 presidential race and managed his California campaign. Kennedy won the California primary, but was assassinated in Los Angeles shortly after his victory speech. After an unsuccessful effort, managed by Unruh and Mayor Richard J. Daley of Chicago, to draft Senator Edward M. Kennedy, Unruh released California delegates to vote their conscience and announced that he would support Eugene McCarthy at the 1968 Democratic National Convention.

U.S. President Lyndon Johnson once described Unruh as "probably one of the most selfish men" he had met in politics.

Unruh left the legislature to unsuccessfully run for governor against Ronald Reagan in 1970. One of his campaign workers was Timothy Kraft, who a decade later was the campaign manager for the unsuccessful reelection bid of President Jimmy Carter. In 1973, Unruh ran unsuccessfully for mayor of Los Angeles.

=== California Treasurer ===
When he campaigned for state treasurer in 1974, the post was considered insignificant. Unruh's radio advertisements assured voters, "Make no mistake about it, I really want this job." Once elected, Unruh politicized the office. The Wall Street Journal noted he became "the most politically powerful public finance officer outside the U.S. Treasury". California pension funds were a major source of revenue for Wall Street underwriting companies, and Unruh secured campaign contributions in exchange for doing business with them. The New York Times said he had gained control of "an obscure post whose duties had long emphasized bookkeeping. In characteristic fashion, he soon transformed the job into a source of financial and political power that reached from California to Wall Street." Because as Treasurer he was an ex officio member of many California boards and commissions, Unruh supervised "the raising and expenditure of virtually all the state's money and consolidated his influence over billions of dollars in public investments and pension funds".

He served as state treasurer from 1975 until his death from prostate cancer on August 4, 1987, 8 months into his 4th term as treasurer. Unruh remains the second-longest-serving California state treasurer, behind only Charles G. Johnson, who served 33 years between 1923 and 1956.

The University of Southern California Department of Political Science includes the Jesse M. Unruh Institute of Politics.

== Personal life ==
Unruh's nickname "Big Daddy" apparently derives from a character in the Tennessee Williams play, Cat on a Hot Tin Roof. Former Senate President pro Tempore Jim Mills in his book A Disorderly House insists it was given to Unruh by then-Assemblyman Don Allen.

Unruh was a Protestant and belonged to the American Legion. He married twice, and had five children.

He died of prostate cancer at his home in Marina Del Rey, California, on August 4, 1987. He is buried in Santa Monica, California.

== Legacy ==
The California State Treasurer's Building was rededicated and renamed the Jesse M. Unruh State Office Building by Governor George Deukmejian on August 19, 1987.

The California State Capitol building's hearing room #4202 currently holds a picture of Jesse M. Unruh.

The California State Assembly Fellowship Program was renamed the Jesse Marvin Unruh Assembly Fellowship Program to honor the former Assembly Speaker and State Treasurer.

== Quotes ==
On campaign contributions: "Money is the mother's milk of politics." 1966
On lobbyists: "If you can't eat their food, drink their booze, screw their women and then vote against them you've got no business being up here." (Note: Has also been quoted with the additional words "take their money" after the clause "screw their women".)

== See also ==
- Glenn E. Coolidge
- Governorship of Ronald Reagan

== Notes ==
Political offices
Preceded by Ralph Brown	Speaker of the California State Assembly; September 1961 – January 1969	Succeeded by Bob Monagan
Preceded by Ivy Baker Priest	Treasurer of California; January 6, 1975 – August 4, 1987	Succeeded by Elizabeth Whitney; Acting
Party political offices
Preceded by Pat Brown	Democratic nominee for Governor of California; 1970	Succeeded by Jerry Brown
Preceded by Milton G. Gordon	Democratic nominee for Treasurer of California; 1974, 1978, 1982, 1986	Succeeded by Kathleen Brown
