= 2014 California Insurance Commissioner election =

- November 4, 2014
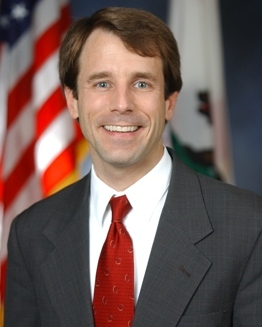

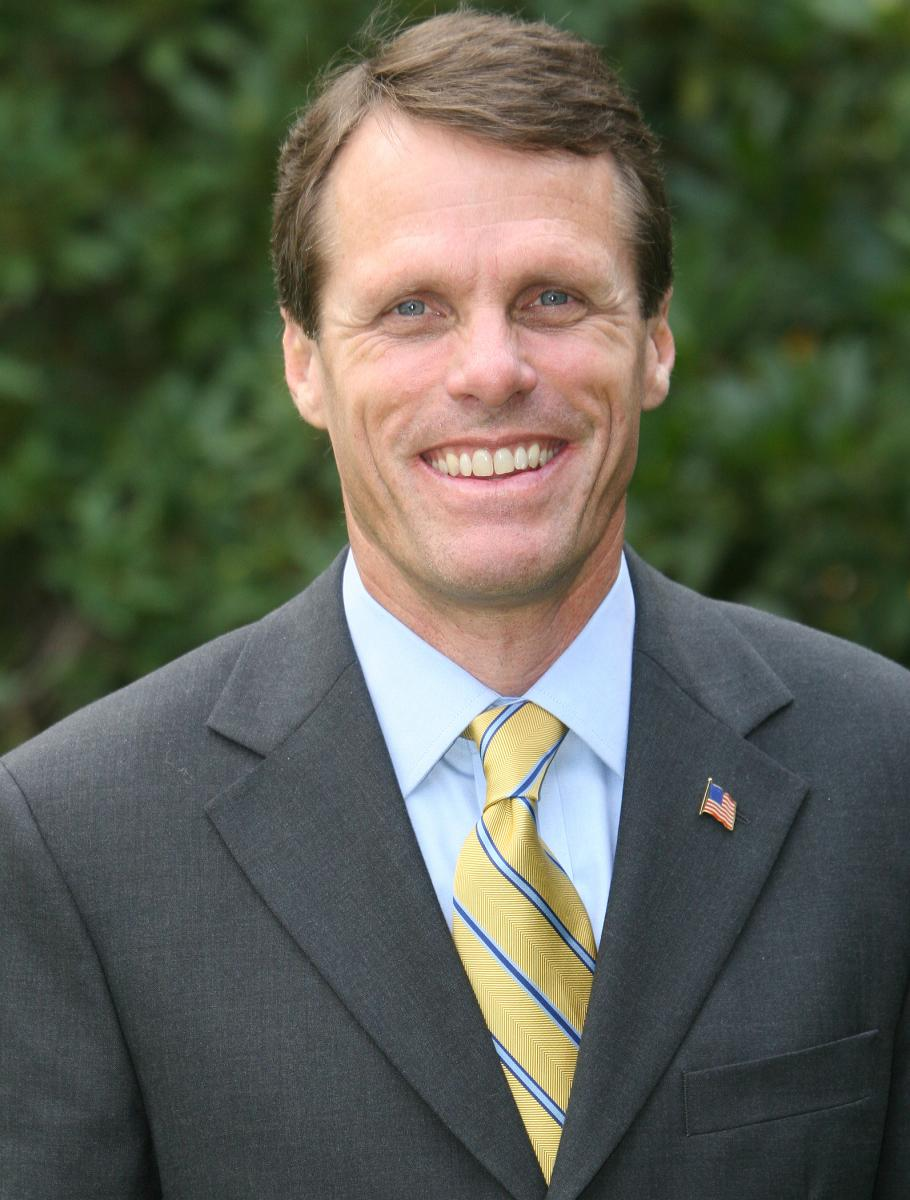
Nominee	Dave Jones	Ted Gaines
Party	Democratic	Republican
Popular vote	4,038,165	2,981,951
Percentage	57.52%	42.48%
- County results Jones: 50–60% 60–70% 70–80% 80–90% Gaines: 50–60% 60–70% 70–80%
Commissioner before election
Dave Jones
Democratic
Elected Commissioner
Dave Jones
Democratic

The 2014 California Insurance Commissioner election was held on November 4, 2014, to elect the Insurance Commissioner of California. Incumbent Democratic Commissioner Dave Jones ran for re-election to a second term in office.

A primary election was held on June 3, 2014. Under California's nonpartisan blanket primary law, all candidates appear on the same ballot, regardless of party. In the primary, voters may vote for any candidate, regardless of their party affiliation. The top two finishers — regardless of party — advance to the general election in November, even if a candidate manages to receive a majority of the votes cast in the primary election. Washington is the only other state with this system, a so-called "top two primary" (Louisiana has a similar "jungle primary"). Jones and Republican Ted Gaines finished first and second, respectively, and contested the general election, which Jones won.

== Primary election ==
=== Candidates ===
==== Democratic Party ====
===== Declared =====
- Dave Jones, incumbent Insurance Commissioner

==== Republican Party ====
===== Declared =====
- Ted Gaines, state senator

===== Withdrew =====
- Michael Villines, former Minority Leader of the California State Assembly and nominee for Insurance Commissioner in 2010

==== Peace and Freedom Party ====
===== Declared =====
- Nathalie Hrizi, teacher and nominee for California's 12th congressional district in 2008

=== Results ===
Results by county Jones: 40–50%; 50–60%; 60–70%; 70–80%; Gaines: 40–50%; 50–60%; 60–70%

Blanket primary results
Party	Candidate	Votes	%
Democratic	Dave Jones (incumbent)	2,106,671	53.05
Republican	Ted Gaines	1,651,242	41.58
Peace and Freedom	Nathalie Hrizi	212,991	5.36
Total votes		3,970,904	100.00

==== By county ====
County	Dave Jones Democratic		Ted Gaines Republican		Nathalie Hrizi Peace and Freedom		Margin		Total
County	#	%	#	%	#	%	#	%	Total
Alameda	131,206	72.25%	38,107	20.99%	12,276	6.76%	93,099	51.27%	181,589
Alpine	227	47.89%	202	42.62%	45	9.49%	25	5.27%	474
Amador	3,568	39.21%	5,079	55.82%	452	4.97%	-1,511	-16.61%	9,099
Butte	15,523	40.23%	20,360	52.76%	2,705	7.01%	-4,837	-12.53%	38,588
Calaveras	4,391	37.76%	6,580	56.59%	657	5.65%	-2,189	-18.83%	11,628
Colusa	1,058	32.38%	2,068	63.30%	141	4.32%	-1,010	-30.92%	3,267
Contra Costa	84,504	62.11%	45,049	33.11%	6,495	4.77%	39,455	29.00%	136,048
Del Norte	2,209	41.98%	2,702	51.35%	351	6.67%	-493	-9.37%	5,262
El Dorado	15,013	37.39%	23,191	57.76%	1,948	4.85%	-8,178	-20.37%	40,152
Fresno	45,459	45.20%	50,523	50.24%	4,587	4.56%	-5,064	-5.04%	100,569
Glenn	1,505	29.61%	3,372	66.34%	206	4.05%	-1,867	-36.73%	5,083
Humboldt	14,175	56.72%	8,886	35.56%	1,929	7.72%	5,289	21.16%	24,990
Imperial	8,896	57.03%	5,604	35.93%	1,098	7.04%	3,292	21.11%	15,598
Inyo	1,440	40.00%	1,946	54.06%	214	5.94%	-506	-14.06%	3,600
Kern	23,517	34.03%	42,321	61.23%	3,277	4.74%	-18,804	-27.21%	69,115
Kings	5,024	35.24%	8,821	61.87%	413	2.90%	-3,797	-26.63%	14,258
Lake	7,316	52.80%	5,173	37.33%	1,367	9.87%	2,143	15.47%	13,856
Lassen	1,514	27.89%	3,668	67.58%	246	4.53%	-2,154	-39.68%	5,428
Los Angeles	392,108	60.77%	211,976	32.85%	41,196	6.38%	180,132	27.92%	645,280
Madera	6,290	35.07%	10,846	60.46%	802	4.47%	-4,556	-25.40%	17,938
Marin	38,245	71.92%	12,283	23.10%	2,650	4.98%	25,962	48.82%	53,178
Mariposa	1,728	37.61%	2,612	56.84%	255	5.55%	-884	-19.24%	4,595
Mendocino	9,287	62.87%	4,130	27.96%	1,354	9.17%	5,157	34.91%	14,771
Merced	9,560	43.27%	11,399	51.59%	1,137	5.15%	-1,839	-8.32%	22,096
Modoc	710	27.24%	1,763	67.65%	133	5.10%	-1,053	-40.41%	2,606
Mono	1,258	45.38%	1,327	47.87%	187	6.75%	-69	-2.49%	2,772
Monterey	28,944	59.86%	16,734	34.61%	2,677	5.54%	12,210	25.25%	48,355
Napa	14,694	57.50%	9,259	36.23%	1,600	6.26%	5,435	21.27%	25,553
Nevada	11,123	44.61%	12,491	50.10%	1,320	5.29%	-1,368	-5.49%	24,934
Orange	122,050	39.02%	177,316	56.69%	13,393	4.28%	-55,266	-17.67%	312,759
Placer	25,946	38.80%	38,201	57.13%	2,724	4.07%	-12,255	-18.33%	66,871
Plumas	1,826	36.76%	2,907	58.53%	234	4.71%	-1,081	-21.76%	4,967
Riverside	78,792	42.75%	97,540	52.92%	7,972	4.33%	-18,748	-10.17%	184,304
Sacramento	106,555	55.76%	77,134	40.36%	7,412	3.88%	29,421	15.40%	191,101
San Benito	3,554	51.72%	2,967	43.18%	350	5.09%	587	8.54%	6,871
San Bernardino	62,971	42.37%	78,167	52.60%	7,478	5.03%	-15,196	-10.23%	148,616
San Diego	183,646	47.40%	189,131	48.81%	14,673	3.79%	-5,485	-1.42%	387,450
San Francisco	85,726	76.47%	16,377	14.61%	9,996	8.92%	69,349	61.86%	112,099
San Joaquin	36,483	47.80%	35,081	45.96%	4,766	6.24%	1,402	1.84%	76,330
San Luis Obispo	27,079	47.28%	27,559	48.12%	2,634	4.60%	-480	-0.84%	57,272
San Mateo	57,256	66.70%	23,701	27.61%	4,879	5.68%	33,555	39.09%	85,836
Santa Barbara	33,345	49.49%	30,510	45.28%	3,527	5.23%	2,835	4.21%	67,382
Santa Clara	149,552	64.35%	69,137	29.75%	13,725	5.91%	80,415	34.60%	232,414
Santa Cruz	29,235	66.10%	11,264	25.47%	3,732	8.44%	17,971	40.63%	44,231
Shasta	9,586	33.48%	17,525	61.21%	1,522	5.32%	-7,939	-27.73%	28,633
Sierra	420	33.49%	732	58.37%	102	8.13%	-312	-24.88%	1,254
Siskiyou	4,149	38.98%	5,823	54.71%	671	6.30%	-1,674	-15.73%	10,643
Solano	29,922	58.69%	18,395	36.08%	2,664	5.23%	11,527	22.61%	50,981
Sonoma	59,734	66.47%	24,142	26.87%	5,984	6.66%	35,592	39.61%	89,860
Stanislaus	23,563	44.93%	26,254	50.06%	2,631	5.02%	-2,691	-5.13%	52,448
Sutter	4,711	32.96%	8,931	62.49%	649	4.54%	-4,220	-29.53%	14,291
Tehama	3,820	31.60%	7,539	62.36%	730	6.04%	-3,719	-30.76%	12,089
Trinity	1,474	42.37%	1,638	47.08%	367	10.55%	-164	-4.71%	3,479
Tulare	14,127	34.02%	25,688	61.85%	1,716	4.13%	-11,561	-27.84%	41,531
Tuolumne	4,525	39.96%	6,160	54.40%	639	5.64%	-1,635	-14.44%	11,324
Ventura	44,487	45.95%	48,368	49.96%	3,964	4.09%	-3,881	-4.01%	96,819
Yolo	18,826	62.52%	9,588	31.84%	1,698	5.64%	9,238	30.68%	30,112
Yuba	2,819	34.15%	4,995	60.51%	441	5.34%	-2,176	-26.36%	8,255
Totals	2,106,671	53.05%	1,651,242	41.58%	212,991	5.36%	455,429	11.47%	3,970,904

== General election ==
=== Polling ===
Poll source	Date(s) administered	Sample size	Margin of error	Dave Jones (D)	Ted Gaines (R)	Undecided
GQR/American Viewpoint	October 22–29, 2014	1,162	± 3.3%	47%	36%	17%
Field Poll	October 15–28, 2014	941	± 3.4%	45%	33%	22%
Field Poll	August 14–28, 2014	467	± 4.8%	47%	32%	21%
Gravis Marketing	July 22–24, 2014	580	± 4%	32%	34%	34%

=== Results ===
2014 California Insurance Commissioner election
Party	Candidate	Votes	%
Democratic	Dave Jones (incumbent)	4,038,165	57.52
Republican	Ted Gaines	2,981,951	42.48
Total votes		7,020,116	100.00
Democratic hold			

==== By county ====
County	Dave Jones Democratic		Ted Gaines Republican		Margin		Total votes cast
County	#	%	#	%	#	%	Total votes cast
Alameda	268,384	79.35%	69,827	20.65%	198,557	58.71%	338,211
Alpine	252	55.26%	204	44.74%	48	10.53%	456
Amador	4,919	39.48%	7,540	60.52%	-2,621	-21.04%	12,459
Butte	26,340	44.91%	32,312	55.09%	-5,972	-10.18%	58,652
Calaveras	5,975	39.37%	9,201	60.63%	-3,226	-21.26%	15,176
Colusa	1,466	36.32%	2,570	63.68%	-1,104	-27.35%	4,036
Contra Costa	157,264	64.68%	85,860	35.32%	71,404	29.37%	243,124
Del Norte	3,060	45.48%	3,668	54.52%	-608	-9.04%	6,728
El Dorado	23,553	39.44%	36,169	60.56%	-12,616	-21.12%	59,722
Fresno	73,729	47.60%	81,177	52.40%	-7,448	-4.81%	154,906
Glenn	1,780	30.61%	4,035	69.39%	-2,255	-38.78%	5,815
Humboldt	22,329	62.88%	13,180	37.12%	9,149	25.77%	35,509
Imperial	12,564	61.34%	7,918	38.66%	4,646	22.68%	20,482
Inyo	2,203	41.85%	3,061	58.15%	-858	-16.30%	5,264
Kern	50,649	38.50%	80,892	61.50%	-30,243	-22.99%	131,541
Kings	8,665	39.66%	13,182	60.34%	-4,517	-20.68%	21,847
Lake	9,712	57.46%	7,190	42.54%	2,522	14.92%	16,902
Lassen	1,808	26.87%	4,920	73.13%	-3,112	-46.25%	6,728
Los Angeles	932,863	66.64%	466,963	33.36%	465,900	33.28%	1,399,826
Madera	10,039	38.26%	16,200	61.74%	-6,161	-23.48%	26,239
Marin	61,645	75.29%	20,235	24.71%	41,410	50.57%	81,880
Mariposa	2,505	39.31%	3,867	60.69%	-1,362	-21.37%	6,372
Mendocino	15,852	68.38%	7,330	31.62%	8,522	36.76%	23,182
Merced	17,900	48.79%	18,791	51.21%	-891	-2.43%	36,691
Modoc	738	26.48%	2,049	73.52%	-1,311	-47.04%	2,787
Mono	1,487	49.29%	1,530	50.71%	-43	-1.43%	3,017
Monterey	45,760	64.25%	25,459	35.75%	20,301	28.51%	71,219
Napa	22,429	62.01%	13,740	37.99%	8,689	24.02%	36,169
Nevada	18,068	48.81%	18,946	51.19%	-878	-2.37%	37,014
Orange	253,433	42.28%	345,984	57.72%	-92,551	-15.44%	599,417
Placer	43,078	38.93%	67,586	61.07%	-24,508	-22.15%	110,664
Plumas	2,660	38.53%	4,243	61.47%	-1,583	-22.93%	6,903
Riverside	158,253	46.26%	183,878	53.74%	-25,625	-7.49%	342,131
Sacramento	183,057	57.88%	133,227	42.12%	49,830	15.75%	316,284
San Benito	7,602	58.20%	5,459	41.80%	2,143	16.41%	13,061
San Bernardino	133,171	47.51%	147,124	52.49%	-13,953	-4.98%	280,295
San Diego	319,429	49.47%	326,308	50.53%	-6,879	-1.07%	645,737
San Francisco	171,711	84.38%	31,775	15.62%	139,936	68.77%	203,486
San Joaquin	57,651	50.99%	55,414	49.01%	2,237	1.98%	113,065
San Luis Obispo	40,668	49.43%	41,611	50.57%	-943	-1.15%	82,279
San Mateo	107,312	70.91%	44,022	29.09%	63,290	41.82%	151,334
Santa Barbara	58,311	55.03%	47,655	44.97%	10,656	10.06%	105,966
Santa Clara	255,196	68.70%	116,293	31.30%	138,903	37.39%	371,489
Santa Cruz	52,160	75.32%	17,095	24.68%	35,065	50.63%	69,255
Shasta	18,329	33.28%	36,750	66.72%	-18,421	-33.44%	55,079
Sierra	553	37.31%	929	62.69%	-376	-25.37%	1,482
Siskiyou	5,428	40.68%	7,916	59.32%	-2,488	-18.65%	13,344
Solano	52,882	60.86%	34,005	39.14%	18,877	21.73%	86,887
Sonoma	96,638	70.57%	40,296	29.43%	56,342	41.15%	136,934
Stanislaus	41,526	47.07%	46,704	52.93%	-5,178	-5.87%	88,230
Sutter	7,291	36.74%	12,554	63.26%	-5,263	-26.52%	19,845
Tehama	4,973	32.82%	10,179	67.18%	-5,206	-34.36%	15,152
Trinity	1,745	46.19%	2,033	53.81%	-288	-7.62%	3,778
Tulare	22,721	37.48%	37,893	62.52%	-15,172	-25.03%	60,614
Tuolumne	6,868	41.60%	9,641	58.40%	-2,773	-16.80%	16,509
Ventura	98,588	51.04%	94,564	48.96%	4,024	2.08%	193,152
Yolo	28,473	65.33%	15,112	34.67%	13,361	30.66%	43,585
Yuba	4,520	37.03%	7,685	62.97%	-3,165	-25.93%	12,205
Total	4,038,165	57.52%	2,981,951	42.48%	1,056,214	15.05%	7,020,116
