= Frederick Peterson (disambiguation) =

Frederick Peterson (1859–1938) was an American neurologist.

Fredrick or Fred Peterson may also refer to:

- Frederick Peterson (politician) (1878–1970), California politician
- Fred L. Peterson (1896–1985), American politician and businessman in the state of Oregon
- Frederick Valdemar Erastus Peterson, a.k.a. Val Peterson (1903–1983), Nebraska politician
- Frederick Alvin Peterson (1920–2009), American archaeologist and anthropologist
- Fritz Peterson (Fred Ingels Peterson, 1942–2023), American baseball player

== See also ==
- Frederick Petersen (disambiguation)
