= Valsequillo =

Valsequillo may refer to the following places:

- Valsequillo de Gran Canaria, a municipality on the island of Gran Canaria in the province of Las Palmas in the Canary Islands.
- Valsequillo, Córdoba, a municipality and a village in the province of Córdoba
- A reservoir and area south of Puebla, Mexico, known for its Pleistocene remains (see Hueyatlaco)
