= 2006 California Attorney General election =

- November 7, 2006
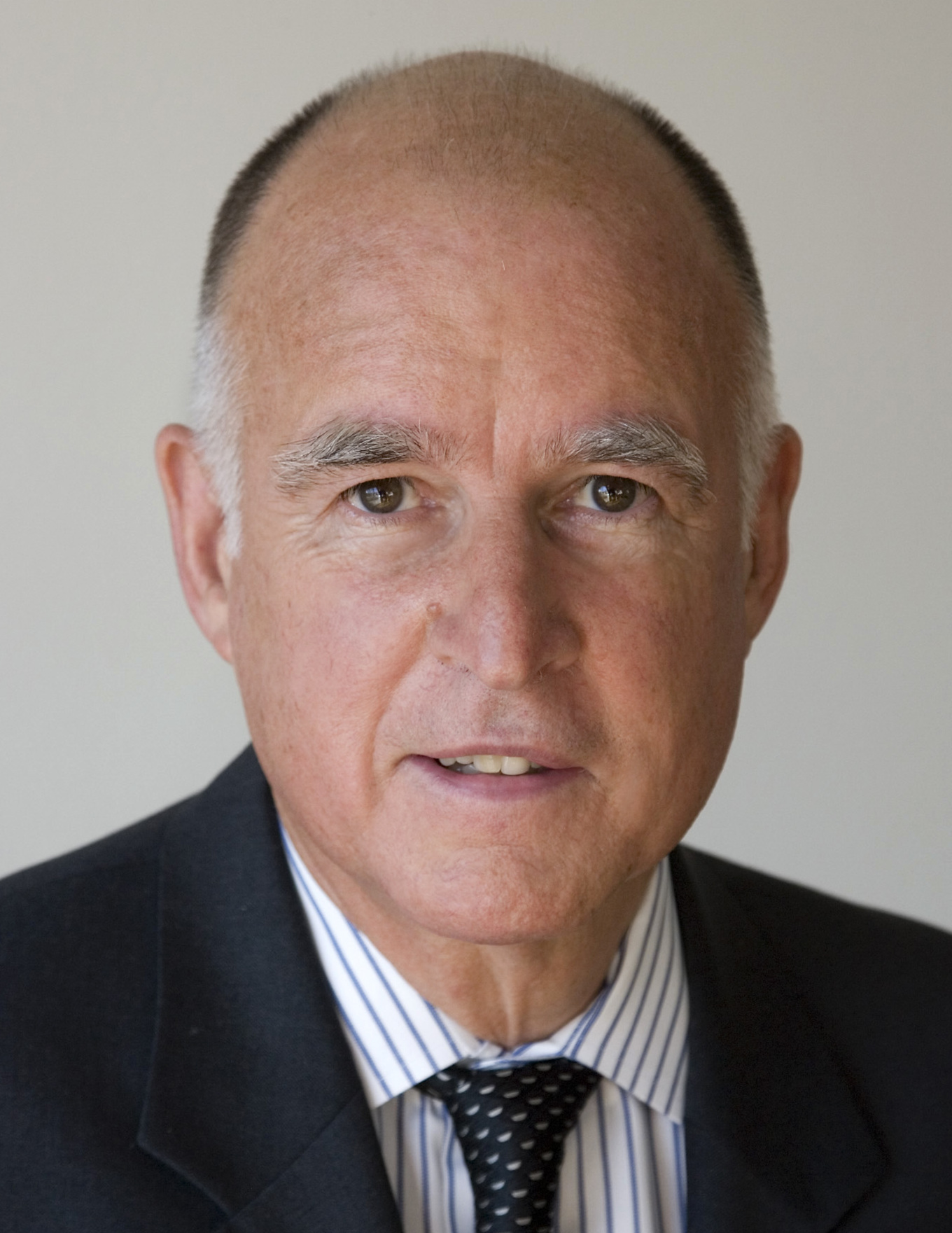

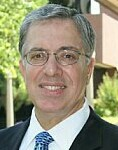
Nominee	Jerry Brown	Chuck Poochigian
Party	Democratic	Republican
Popular vote	4,756,184	3,220,429
Percentage	56.3%	38.1%
- County results Brown: 40–50% 50–60% 60–70% 70–80% Poochigian: 40–50% 50–60% 60–70%
Attorney General before election
Bill Lockyer
Democratic
Elected Attorney General
Jerry Brown
Democratic

The 2006 California attorney general election occurred on November 7, 2006. The primary elections took place on June 6, 2006. Former and future Governor Jerry Brown, the Democratic nominee, easily defeated the Republican nominee, State Senator Chuck Poochigian, for the office previously held by Democrat Bill Lockyer, who was term-limited and ran for treasurer.

== Primary results ==
Results by county are available here and here.

=== Democratic ===
California attorney general Democratic primary, 2006
Candidate	Votes	%
Jerry Brown	1,552,949	63.23
Rocky Delgadillo	903,549	36.77
Total votes	2,456,498	100.00

=== Others ===
California attorney general primary, 2006 (others)
Party	Candidate	Votes	%
Republican	Chuck Poochigian	1,553,604	100.00
Green	Michael Wyman	31,018	100.00
Libertarian	Kenneth Weissman	16,567	100.00
Peace and Freedom	Jack Harrison	3,736	100.00

== Results ==
California attorney general election, 2006
Party	Candidate	Votes	%
Democratic	Jerry Brown	4,756,184	56.29
Republican	Chuck Poochigian	3,220,429	38.11
Green	Michael Wyman	195,130	2.31
Libertarian	Kenneth Weissman	177,469	2.10
Peace and Freedom	Jack Harrison	100,797	1.19
Invalid or blank votes		449,050	5.05
Total votes		8,450,009	100.00
Turnout			39.29
Democratic hold			

=== Results by county ===
Results from the Secretary of State of California:

County	Brown	Votes	Poochigian	Votes	Wyman	Votes	Weissman	Votes	Harrison	Votes
San Francisco	79.73%	188,409	11.65%	27,523	5.70%	13,479	1.78%	4,208	1.14%	2,686
Santa Cruz	75.01%	66,560	19.12%	16,962	3.29%	2,922	1.70%	1,512	0.88%	777
Marin	73.45%	76,182	21.08%	21,868	3.23%	3,354	1.50%	1,559	0.72%	751
Alameda	73.10%	290,072	18.43%	73,120	5.23%	20,740	1.72%	6,824	1.52%	6,036
San Mateo	70.78%	141,617	23.91%	47,828	2.91%	5,815	1.53%	3,067	0.87%	1,747
Sonoma	68.66%	116,443	24.57%	41,663	3.40%	5,765	2.00%	3,385	1.38%	2,343
Santa Clara	66.69%	279,105	27.78%	116,284	2.41%	10,072	2.15%	8,983	0.98%	4,094
Mendocino	66.20%	20,045	25.78%	7,807	4.30%	1,301	2.47%	747	1.25%	379
Contra Costa	66.21%	196,765	29.28%	87,008	2.18%	6,479	1.32%	3,929	1.00%	2,981
Monterey	65.07%	56,367	30.18%	26,138	1.87%	1,623	1.81%	1,567	1.07%	926
Los Angeles	64.48%	1,222,860	30.20%	572,820	1.86%	35,245	2.20%	41,759	1.26%	23,881
Napa	63.55%	26,731	31.01%	13,042	2.59%	1,089	1.87%	785	0.98%	413
Solano	61.43%	62,774	33.48%	34,219	1.90%	1,938	2.11%	2,157	1.08%	1,105
Yolo	60.06%	31,930	33.79%	17,963	3.30%	1,756	2.20%	1,169	0.65%	346
San Benito	59.39%	8,374	35.61%	5,022	1.63%	230	2.33%	329	1.04%	146
Humboldt	58.61%	27,643	32.28%	15,224	5.26%	2,479	2.46%	1,158	1.39%	657
Lake	56.65%	10,795	36.07%	6,873	2.97%	566	2.51%	478	1.81%	344
Imperial	55.98%	12,152	37.23%	8,082	1.88%	409	2.26%	490	2.65%	576
Santa Barbara	54.33%	64,823	40.03%	47,760	2.28%	2,716	2.27%	2,705	1.09%	1,304
Alpine	54.27%	286	37.19%	196	3.61%	19	3.80%	20	1.14%	6
Sacramento	52.58%	184,560	42.52%	149,246	2.09%	7,341	1.71%	6,001	1.11%	3,888
Ventura	51.58%	111,773	43.67%	94,635	1.53%	3,323	2.14%	4,636	1.07%	2,329
San Bernardino	49.63%	167,145	44.73%	150,659	1.76%	5,932	2.53%	8,524	1.35%	4,555
San Diego	49.60%	374,717	45.25%	341,832	1.98%	14,926	2.10%	15,879	1.08%	8,156
San Joaquin	49.13%	67,219	45.40%	62,122	1.86%	2,548	1.95%	2,670	1.66%	2,267
Mono	48.49%	1,785	44.47%	1,637	2.99%	110	2.93%	108	1.11%	41
Trinity	48.27%	2,729	42.84%	2,422	3.29%	186	3.86%	218	1.75%	99
Del Norte	48.29%	3,192	44.81%	2,962	2.57%	170	3.10%	205	1.23%	81
Nevada	48.19%	20,449	46.42%	19,697	2.67%	1,134	2.04%	867	0.67%	286
San Luis Obispo	47.21%	44,512	47.38%	44,668	2.16%	2,032	2.25%	2,123	1.00%	946
Riverside	47.00%	176,341	47.90%	179,692	1.69%	6,331	2.09%	7,854	1.32%	4,956
Stanislaus	45.43%	46,375	50.03%	51,071	1.55%	1,580	1.68%	1,713	1.31%	1,341
Butte	45.22%	30,300	48.90%	32,768	3.11%	2,083	2.65%	1,779	0.12%	82
Inyo	44.33%	2,818	48.97%	3,113	2.89%	184	2.61%	166	1.20%	76
Merced	44.30%	18,277	50.50%	20,834	1.60%	661	2.07%	855	1.53%	631
Tuolumne	43.21%	9,023	51.45%	10,743	2.06%	430	2.06%	431	1.22%	255
Plumas	42.83%	3,744	51.49%	4,501	2.11%	184	2.30%	201	1.27%	111
Amador	41.98%	6,133	52.62%	7,688	2.18%	319	2.18%	318	1.05%	153
Calaveras	42.23%	7,419	52.71%	9,260	2.17%	382	2.77%	486	0.13%	22
Orange	41.46%	293,982	52.89%	375,038	1.77%	12,525	2.62%	18,571	1.27%	8,973
Siskiyou	41.21%	6,731	51.78%	8,456	2.11%	344	3.42%	559	1.48%	242
El Dorado	40.56%	26,966	53.89%	35,829	2.39%	1,587	2.34%	1,553	0.83%	554
Placer	40.44%	48,800	54.74%	66,051	2.00%	2,415	2.10%	2,530	0.72%	866
Sierra	38.87%	608	53.84%	842	2.43%	38	3.90%	61	0.96%	15
Colusa	38.03%	1,848	58.06%	2,821	1.28%	62	1.77%	86	0.86%	42
Tehama	37.64%	6,672	56.22%	9,965	1.82%	322	2.82%	500	1.51%	267
Mariposa	37.51%	2,834	56.31%	4,254	2.57%	194	2.30%	174	1.31%	99
Yuba	36.96%	5,067	55.90%	7,664	2.17%	298	3.31%	454	1.66%	227
Sutter	36.60%	8,591	58.56%	13,746	1.57%	369	1.90%	446	1.37%	321
Shasta	36.02%	20,866	58.43%	33,846	1.74%	1,009	2.47%	1,431	1.33%	772
Fresno	35.55%	61,932	60.20%	104,877	1.66%	2,884	1.41%	2,457	1.19%	2,076
Glenn	35.69%	2,607	60.41%	4,412	1.62%	118	2.15%	157	0.14%	10
Kings	34.05%	7,720	61.84%	14,019	1.24%	282	1.69%	384	1.17%	266
Lassen	33.84%	2,856	57.84%	4,881	2.41%	203	4.48%	378	1.43%	121
Modoc	33.72%	1,238	58.62%	2,152	2.02%	74	4.20%	154	1.44%	53
Kern	32.18%	47,771	61.60%	91,441	1.99%	2,957	2.82%	4,179	1.41%	2092
Tulare	31.18%	21,296	64.86%	44,304	1.49%	1,020	1.52%	1,041	0.95%	647
Madera	31.02%	9,199	64.19%	19,035	1.94%	576	1.65%	489	1.20%	355

== See also ==
- California state elections, 2006
- State of California
- California attorney general
- List of attorneys general of California
