= George Plescia =

American politician

Minority Leader of the California Assembly
- In office April 17, 2006 - November 10, 2006
- Preceded by: Kevin McCarthy
- Succeeded by: Michael Villines

Member of the California State Assembly from the 75th district
- In office December 2, 2002 - November 30, 2008
- Preceded by: Charlene Zettel
- Succeeded by: Nathan Fletcher

Personal details
- Born: George Andrew Plescia; August 19, 1966 (age 59) Sacramento, California, US
- Party: Republican
- Spouse: Melissa Dollaghan
- Education: California State University, Sacramento

George Andrew Plescia (/ˈplɛʃə/; born August 19, 1966) is a U.S. Republican politician from California. He served in the California State Assembly from 2002 and 2008, and served as its Minority Leader in 2006.

== Career ==
Born in Sacramento, California, Plescia graduated from California State University, Sacramento. Plescia worked as an unpaid intern for former State Senator Bill Morrow in his district office, and eventually became a paid staff member of Morrow's staff. Plescia was elected to the California State Assembly in 2002 to represent the 75th Assembly District, which covers parts of northern San Diego County, California. For part of 2006, Plescia served as floor leader of the California State Assembly's Republican caucus. In 2009, he was appointed by Governor Arnold Schwarzenegger to serve on the California Unemployment Insurance Appeals Board.

=== 2012 State Senate campaign ===
Plescia ran against incumbent Democrat Marty Block to represent California's 39th district in the State Senate. Block defeated Plescia 58.4% to 41.6% in the November general election. He took office on December 3, 2012.

During the campaign, Plescia generated controversy after running ads that accused Block of siding with teachers who sexually abused students. However, Block had actually voted against a procedural maneuver, not the bill itself. San Diego Assemblyman Nathan Fletcher, a former Republican, said that Plescia was "playing politics" with his accusation against Block.

San Diego CityBeat called Plescia's claims "despicable" and "disgusting." Although the U-T San Diego published an editorial criticizing Block for his vote, the newspaper also acknowledged that Block's vote was procedural.

== Personal life ==
Plescia and his wife Melissa Dollaghan live in San Diego. He enjoys playing basketball and is a sports fan.

California Assembly
Preceded by Charlene Zettel	California State Assemblyman; 75th District; December 2, 2002–November 30, 2008	Succeeded by Nathan Fletcher
Party political offices
Preceded by Kevin McCarthy	California State Assembly Republican Leader; April 17, 2006–November 10, 2006	Succeeded by Michael Villines
