= Fred Petersen =

Frederick or Fred Petersen may refer to:

- Frederick Petersen (1874–1946), American physiotherapist and politician
- Fred Petersen (rugby league) (born 1978), Samoan rugby player
- Fred A. Petersen (1808–1885), American architect
- Fred C. Petersen (1908–1989), American politician from Florida
- Fredrik Petersen (born 1983), Swedish handball coach and player

== See also ==
- Frederick Peterson (disambiguation)
