= John C. Williamson =

American politician (1912–1998)

Member of the California State Assembly from the 29th district
- In office January 7, 1963 - January 2, 1967
- Preceded by: Bruce F. Allen
- Succeeded by: William M. Ketchum

Member of the California State Assembly from the 39th district
- In office January 5, 1959 - January 7, 1963
- Preceded by: H. W. "Pat" Kelly
- Succeeded by: George Deukmejian

Personal details
- Born: September 15, 1912 Oskaloosa, Kansas
- Died: October 11, 1998 (aged 86) Plumas County, California
- Party: Democratic
- Spouse: Laurel Jean Stewart (m. 1945)
- Children: 4

Military service
- Branch/service: United States Army
- Battles/wars: World War II

John C. Williamson (September 15, 1912 – October 11, 1998) was an American politician who served in the California State Assembly for the 39th and 29th district from 1959 to 1967. During World War II he served in the United States Army.
