= Steven N. Samuelian =

American politician

Steven Samuelian

Member of the California State Assembly from the 29th district
- In office December 2, 2002 – November 30, 2004
- Preceded by: Mike Briggs
- Succeeded by: Michael Villines

Personal details
- Born: August 26, 1969 (age 56) Arcadia, California, U.S.
- Party: Republican
- Spouse: Houry
- Children: 2

Steven N. Samuelian (August 26, 1969) is a Republican politician from the state of California in the United States of America. He was elected to the 29th district of the California State Assembly in 2002. He succeeded Mike Briggs who stepped down to make an unsuccessful run for Congress. He served one term in the assembly, and withdrew from the 2004 campaign. Mike Villines succeeded the assemblyman.

== Background ==
Samuelian is an alumnus of California Polytechnic State University, Pomona. He served in a variety of Republican Party and Republican candidate campaign positions before holding public office. He also held a number of board positions on local organizations and committees.

== 2002 election - California's 29th State Assembly, 29th district ==
Samuelian defeated Larry Willey in the Republican primary and Richard Martinez, Jr. in the General Election.

== 2003 scandal ==
During Samuelian's 2002 run for the state assembly, he revealed that in 1998 he had been cited by the police for loitering for the purpose of solicitation of prostitution. Samuelian paid a fine, and the citation was removed from his record.

Samuelian later encountered controversy in February 2003, when it was reported that he was again stopped and questioned by police when his vehicle was noted on the same block of the same street as before. This time he claimed he was delivering political fliers to the farm bureau. Samuelian denied any wrongdoing, and was not charged.

However, in the wake of this incident, Samuelian faced public calls to resign from members of his own party including Clayton Smith, his former boss United States Congressman George Radanovich (R), United States Congressman Devin Nunes (R), and Michael Der Manouel, Jr., president of the Fresno County Lincoln Club.

In December 2003, Samuelian announced that he would not seek re-election in 2004 in order to spend more time with his family.

== California Consulting ==
Steve Samuelian currently owns the state's largest grant writing company, California Consulting, LLC with offices in Southern, Central, and Northern California.

California Assembly
Preceded by Mike Briggs	California State Assemblyman, 29th district 2002 – 2004	Succeeded by Michael Villines
