= Richard J. Dolwig =

American politician

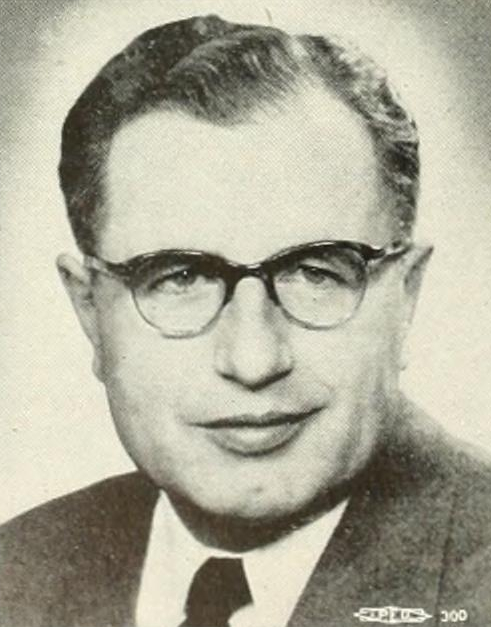
- Dolwig c. 1954

Member of the California State Senate
- In office January 7, 1957 – January 4, 1971
- Preceded by: Harry L. Parkman
- Succeeded by: Arlen F. Gregorio
- Constituency: 21st district (1957–1967); 12th district (1967–1971)

Member of the California State Assembly
- In office January 6, 1947 – January 7, 1957
- Preceded by: Harrison W. Call
- Succeeded by: Carl A. Britschgi
- Constituency: 27th district (1947–1953); 26th district (1953–1957)

Personal details
- Born: April 29, 1908 Dickinson, North Dakota
- Died: November 26, 1992 (aged 84) Sacramento, California
- Party: Republican
- Spouse: Lisabeth Florenz Treu (m. 1953)
- Education: University of North Dakota; Ohio State University; Stanford University

Military service
- Branch/service: United States Army
- Years of service: 1942-1946
- Battles/wars: World War II

Richard J. Dolwig (April 29, 1908 – November 26, 1992) was an American politician who served in the California State Assembly for the 21st and 27th District from 1947 to 1957. He served in the California State Senate from 1957 to 1961. During World War II he also served in the United States Army. He was noted for introducing a 1961 legislative act with Pauline L. Davis and introduced a proposal in 1965 to split California in half.
