= 2010 California Insurance Commissioner election =

- November 2, 2010
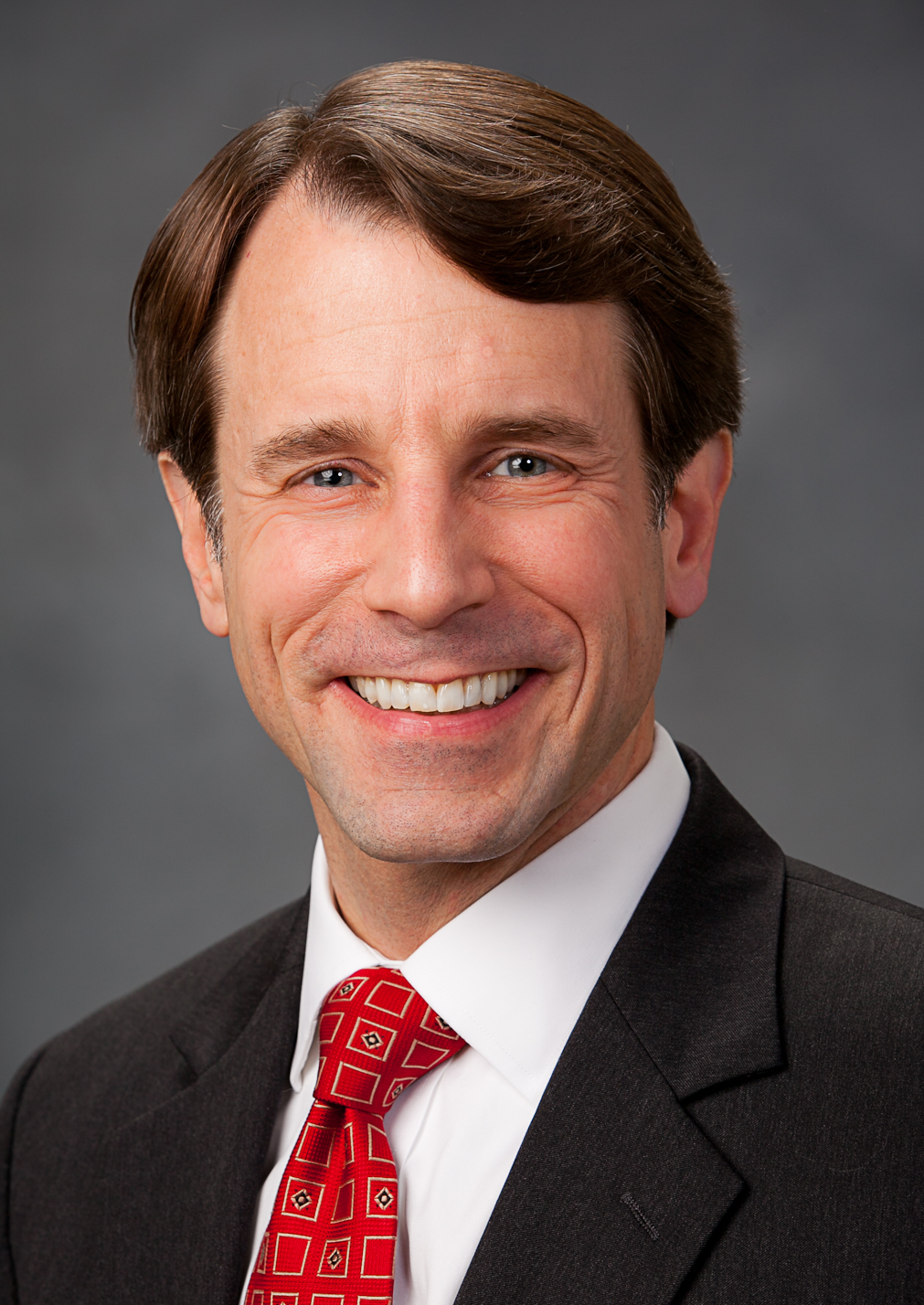

Nominee	Dave Jones	Michael Villines
Party	Democratic	Republican
Popular vote	4,765,400	3,540,626
Percentage	50.57%	37.57%
- County results Jones: 40–50% 50–60% 60–70% 70–80% Villines: 40–50% 50–60% 60–70%
Insurance Commissioner before election
Steve Poizner
Republican
Elected Insurance Commissioner
Dave Jones
Democratic

The 2010 California Insurance Commissioner election was held on November 2, 2010, to choose the Insurance Commissioner of California. The primary election was held on June 8, 2010. Incumbent Insurance Commissioner Steve Poizner, a Republican, ran for Governor of California and did not seek reelection. Democratic Assemblyman Dave Jones defeated Republican Michael Villines in the general election.

== Candidates ==
The following were certified by the California Secretary of State as candidates in the primary election for Insurance Commissioner. Candidates who won their respective primaries and qualified for the general election are shown in bold.

=== American Independent ===
- **Clay Pedersen**, retail manager

=== Democratic ===
- Hector De La Torre, California State Assemblyman from the 50th district
- **Dave Jones**, California State Assemblyman from the 9th district

=== Green ===
- **William Balderston**, teacher and union organizer

=== Libertarian ===
- **Richard Bronstein**, insurance broker

=== Peace and Freedom ===
- **Dina Padilla**, injured worker consultant

=== Republican ===
- Brian FitzGerald, attorney
- **Mike Villines**, California State Assemblyman from the 29th district and former Assembly Minority Leader

== Primary results ==
=== Democratic ===
California Democratic Insurance Commissioner primary, 2010
Candidate	Votes	%
Dave Jones	**1,255,656**	**61.4**
Hector De La Torre	790,493	38.6
Total votes	**2,046,149**	**100.0**
Turnout	7,553,109	27.1%

=== Republican ===
California Republican Insurance Commissioner primary, 2010
Candidate	Votes	%
Mike Villines	**988,661**	**50.5**
Brian FitzGerald	972,315	49.5
Total votes	**1,960,976**	**100.0**
Turnout	5,228,320	37.5%

=== Others ===
California Insurance Commissioner primary, 2010 (others)
Party	Candidate	Votes	%
**American Independent**	**Clay Pedersen**	**39,843**	**100.0**
**Green**	**William Balderston**	**20,803**	**100.0**
**Libertarian**	**Richard Bronstein**	**18,011**	**100.0**
**Peace and Freedom**	**Dina Padilla**	**4,012**	**100.0**

== General election results ==
California Insurance Commissioner election, 2010
Party	Candidate	Votes	%	±%
**Democratic**	**Dave Jones**	**4,765,400**	**50.57%**	**+12.08%**
Republican	Mike Villines	3,540,626	37.57%	−13.24%
Libertarian	Richard Bronstein	372,676	3.96%	+0.29%
Peace and Freedom	Dina Padilla	293,502	3.11%	+0.86%
Green	William Balderston	252,301	2.68%	−0.57%
American Independent	Clay Pedersen	198,347	2.10%	+0.57%
Total votes		**9,422,852**	**100.0%**	
Democratic **gain** from Republican				
