= Bill Thomas =

American politician (born 1941)

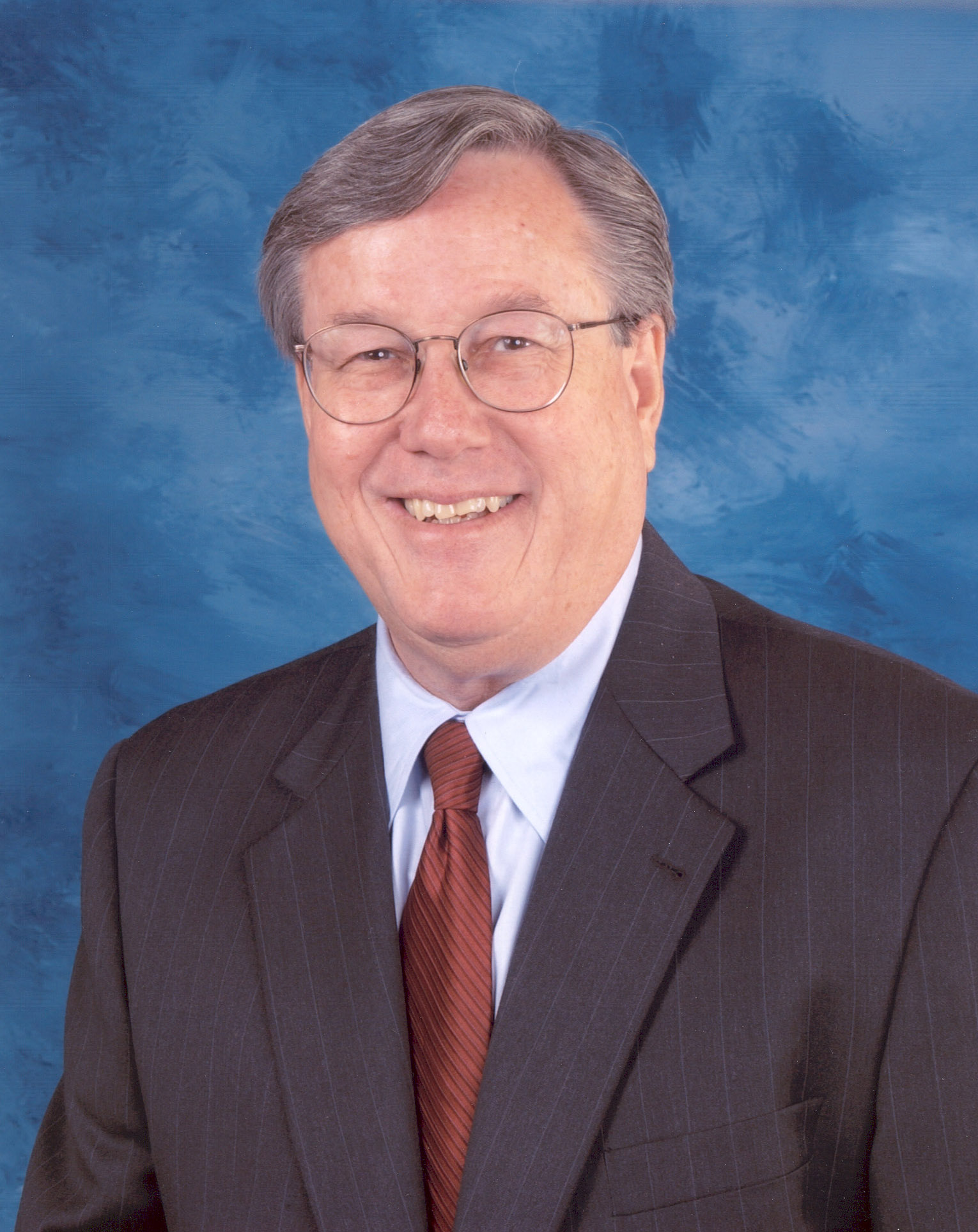

Chair of the House Ways and Means Committee
- In office January 3, 2001 – January 3, 2007
- Preceded by: Bill Archer
- Succeeded by: Charles Rangel

Chair of the House Administration Committee
- In office January 3, 1995 – January 3, 2001
- Preceded by: Charlie Rose
- Succeeded by: Bob Ney

Member of the U.S. House of Representatives from California
- In office January 3, 1979 – January 3, 2007
- Preceded by: William M. Ketchum
- Succeeded by: Kevin McCarthy
- Constituency: 18th district (1979–1983); 20th district (1983–1993); 21st district (1993–2003); 22nd district (2003–2007)

Member of the California State Assembly from the 33rd district
- In office December 2, 1974 – November 30, 1978
- Preceded by: Ernest N. Mobley
- Succeeded by: Don Rogers

Personal details
- Born: William Marshall Thomas; December 6, 1941 (age 84) Wallace, Idaho, U.S.
- Party: Republican
- Spouse: Sharon Thomas
- Children: 2
- Education: Santa Ana College; San Francisco State University (BA, MA)
- Thomas's voice Thomas opening debate on the Medicare Modernization Act. Recorded June 26, 2003

William Marshall Thomas (born December 6, 1941) is an American politician. He was a Republican member of the United States House of Representatives from 1979 to 2007, finishing his tenure representing California's 22nd congressional district and as the chair of the House Ways and Means Committee.

== Early life and family ==
Thomas was born in Wallace, Idaho, moving with his parents to Southern California. He graduated from Garden Grove High School, attended Santa Ana College, earning an associate's degree before transferring to San Francisco State University, where he earned his bachelor's degree and master's degree in political science in 1963 and 1965, respectively. He became an instructor at Bakersfield College before running for and winning a seat in the California State Assembly in 1974. He won election to the House of Representatives in 1978, representing the 18th congressional district.

Thomas married the former Sharon Lynn Hamilton in 1968. They have two grown children. He and his wife are Baptists.

== Career ==
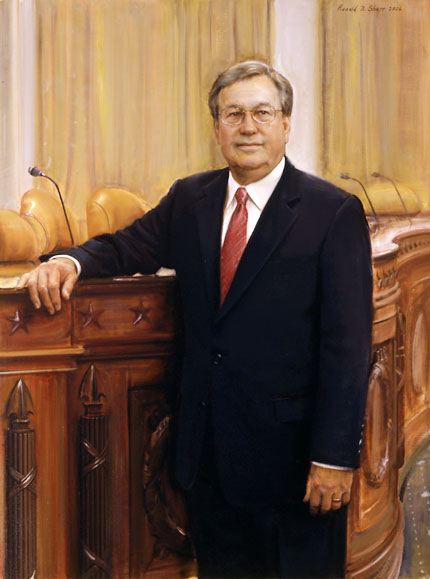
Thomas's official portrait by artist Ronald N. Sherr

When Washingtonian magazine polled congressional aides on the "best and worst" of Congress, Thomas was voted #2 for "brainiest", #3 for "workhorse", and #1 for "meanest" and overwhelmingly for "hottest temper" in the House. Thomas is known for being able to comprehend and communicate the intricacies of obscure legislative matters, studying testimony and research reports himself instead of relying on executive summaries from his aides. Thomas is also known for losing his temper when people are unprepared, earning a reputation for sharp interrogations. "He's revered, but he's also reviled to some degree", fellow representative Mark Foley told CQ Weekly.

Thomas voted against the Abandoned Shipwrecks Act of 1987. The Act asserts United States title to certain abandoned shipwrecks located on or embedded in submerged lands under state jurisdiction, and transfers title to the respective state, thereby empowering states to manage these cultural and historical resources more efficiently, with the goal of preventing treasure hunters and salvagers from damaging them. Despite him voting against hit, President Ronald Reagan signed it into law on April 28, 1988.

Thomas voted 'yea' on all four articles of impeachment against President Bill Clinton in 1998, including both perjury charges, obstruction of justice, and abuse of power.

Thomas was a key proponent of several of President George W. Bush's agenda items, including three major tax cut bills and the Medicare Prescription Drug, Improvement, and Modernization Act of 2003 (PL 108–173), and was also instrumental in the passage of the Balanced Budget Act of 1997.

On March 6, 2006, Thomas announced he would not seek reelection, retiring after 28 years in the House. A major influence on his decision was the internal GOP term limits that would require him to relinquish his Ways and Means chairmanship even if he were re-elected. Thomas endorsed a former aide, Assemblyman Kevin McCarthy, who was elected to replace him. Following McCarthy's vote to decertify the 2020 presidential election, Thomas said that McCarthy was a "hypocrite" and generally lambasted his behavior in regard to that election. Thomas has criticized McCarthy in several interviews since that time.

In 2007, after leaving the House, Thomas joined the American Enterprise Institute as a visiting fellow working on tax policy, trade policy, and health care policy. Thomas also joined law and lobbying firm Buchanan, Ingersoll & Rooney.

On September 8, 2016, Thomas was named to the Kern Community College District Board of Trustees for Area 1, filling the seat of Rick Wright. He did not run for reelection in 2018. He was replaced by Nan Gomez-Heitzeberg.

=== Congressional committees ===
U.S. House Committee on Ways and Means – Chairman (2001–2007)

U.S. House Committee on Administration – Chairman (1995–2001)

=== Controversies ===
==== 1992: Congressional banking scandal ====
In the 1992 Rubbergate banking scandal, involving House members writing checks when the funds were not available, Thomas bounced 119 checks, the tenth-highest amount for a Republican member of Congress. A brief overdraft of $16,200, occurred in October 1989, as he wrote a $15,300 check to buy a car.

=== 2001: alleged affair with lobbyist ===
The Bakersfield Californian published an article on Thomas about an affair with Deborah Steelman, a lobbyist for Cigna, Pfizer, Aetna, United Healthcare Corporation, the Healthcare Leadership Council, and Prudential. Thomas was then chair of the House subcommittee that regulates HMOs. "Any personal failures of commitment or responsibility to my wife, family or friends are just that, personal," the former congressman wrote in an "open letter to friends and neighbors." Neither he nor Steelman explicitly denied the allegations. She was promoted to Vice President of Eli Lilly, a position which she used to steer huge campaign gifts to Thomas's war chest.

The Medicare Modernization Act of 2003 prohibited Medicare from negotiating prescription prices with the drug industry, for instance.

=== 2003: controversy involving U.S. Capitol police ===
In July 2003, Thomas called the U.S. Capitol Police to eject Democrats from a meeting room. A few days later, he tearfully apologized on the House floor for what he called his "just plain stupid" decision to ask the police to eject the Congressmen.

== Election history ==
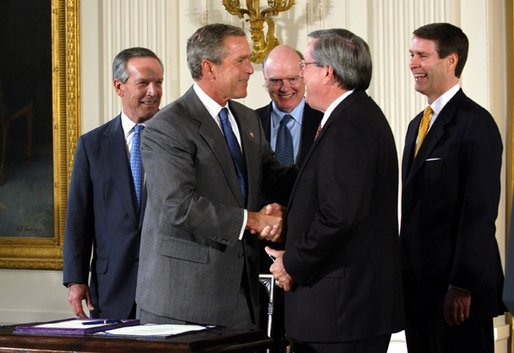
Bill Thomas congratulating President George W. Bush shortly after signing the Jobs and Growth Tax Relief Reconciliation Act of 2003

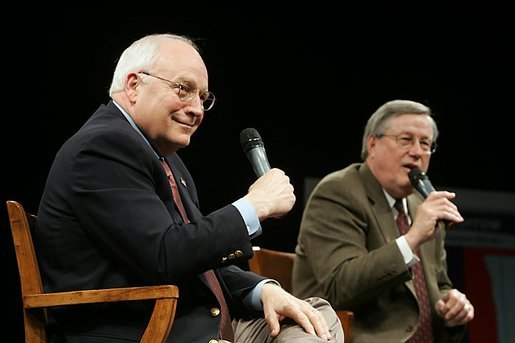
Bill Thomas with Vice President Dick Cheney at a Town Hall meeting on Social Security in 2005

- 1974 – Defeated Raymond Gonzales – 54–46%
- 1976 – Defeated Stephen W. Schilling – 57–43%
- 1978 – Defeated Bob Sogge – 59–41%
- 1980 – Defeated Mary Pat Timmermans – 71–29%
- 1982 – Defeated Robert J. Bethea – 68–32%
- 1984 – Defeated Michael T. LeSage – 71–29%
- 1986 – Defeated Jules H. Moquin – 73–27%
- 1988 – Defeated Lita Reid – 71–27%
- 1990 – Defeated Michael Thomas – 60–34%
- 1992 – Defeated Deborah Vollmer – 65–35%
- 1994 – Defeated John Evans – 69–28%
- 1996 – Defeated Deborah Vollmer – 66–27%
- 1998 – Defeated John Evans – 79–21%
- 2000 – Defeated Pete Martinez – 72–25%
- 2002 – Defeated Jaime Corvera – 73–24%
- 2004 – Unopposed

U.S. House of Representatives
Preceded by William M. Ketchum	Member of the U.S. House of Representatives from California's 18th congressional district 1979–1983	Succeeded by Richard H. Lehman
Preceded by Barry Goldwater Jr.	Member of the U.S. House of Representatives from California's 20th congressional district 1983–1993	Succeeded by Cal Dooley
Preceded by Elton Gallegly	Member of the U.S. House of Representatives from California's 21st congressional district 1993–2003	Succeeded by Devin Nunes
Preceded by Charlie Rose	Chair of the House Administration Committee; 1995–2001	Succeeded by Bob Ney
Preceded by Bill Archer	Chair of the House Ways and Means Committee; 2001–2007	Succeeded by Charles Rangel
Preceded by Lois Capps	Member of the U.S. House of Representatives from California's 22nd congressional district 2003–2007	Succeeded by Kevin McCarthy
U.S. order of precedence (ceremonial)
Preceded by Solomon Ortiz as Former U.S. Representative	Order of precedence of the United States as Former U.S. Representative	Succeeded by Duncan L. Hunter as Former U.S. Representative
