= Mark Stone (politician) =

American politician and lawyer (born 1957)

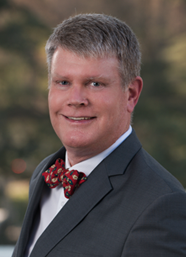

Member of the California State Assembly from the 29th district
- In office December 3, 2012 – December 5, 2022
- Preceded by: Bill Monning (redistricted)
- Succeeded by: Robert Rivas (redistricted)

Personal details
- Born: June 17, 1957 (age 69) Santa Barbara, California, U.S.
- Party: Democratic
- Education: University of California, Berkeley (BA); Santa Clara University (JD)
- Profession: Lawyer
- Website: a29.asmdc.org

Mark Stone (born June 17, 1957) is an American lawyer and politician who served in the California State Assembly. He is a Democrat who represented the 29th Assembly District, which encompassed parts of the northern Central Coast.

Prior to being elected to the Assembly in 2012, he was a Santa Cruz County Supervisor and served on the Scotts Valley School Board prior to that.

In 2009, he successfully swam the English Channel.

== 2014 California State Assembly ==
California's 29th State Assembly district election, 2014
Primary election
Party	Candidate	Votes	%
Democratic	Mark Stone (incumbent)	58,117	68.4
Republican	Palmer Kain	26,905	31.6
Total votes		85,022	100.0
General election
Democratic	Mark Stone (incumbent)	88,265	69.4
Republican	Palmer Kain	38,903	30.6
Total votes		127,168	100.0
Democratic hold			

== 2016 California State Assembly ==
California's 29th State Assembly district election, 2016
Primary election
Party	Candidate	Votes	%
Democratic	Mark Stone (incumbent)	107,770	75.0
Republican	Sierra Roberts	35,934	25.0
Total votes		143,704	100.0
General election
Democratic	Mark Stone (incumbent)	156,703	72.2
Republican	Sierra Roberts	60,245	27.8
Total votes		216,948	100.0
Democratic hold			

== 2018 California State Assembly ==
California's 29th State Assembly district election, 2018
Primary election
Party	Candidate	Votes	%
Democratic	Mark Stone (incumbent)	86,641	72.4
Republican	Vicki L. Nohrden	33,073	27.6
Total votes		119,714	100.0
General election
Democratic	Mark Stone (incumbent)	147,237	71.8
Republican	Vicki L. Nohrden	57,714	28.2
Total votes		204,951	100.0
Democratic hold			

== 2020 California State Assembly ==
2020 California's 29th State Assembly district election
Primary election
Party	Candidate	Votes	%
Democratic	Mark Stone (incumbent)	90,034	73.9%
Republican	Shomir Banerjee	31,767	26.1%
Total votes			

Government offices
Preceded by Bill Monning	California State Assembly District 29; 2012–2022	Succeeded by none
