= Linda Halderman =

American politician (born 1968)

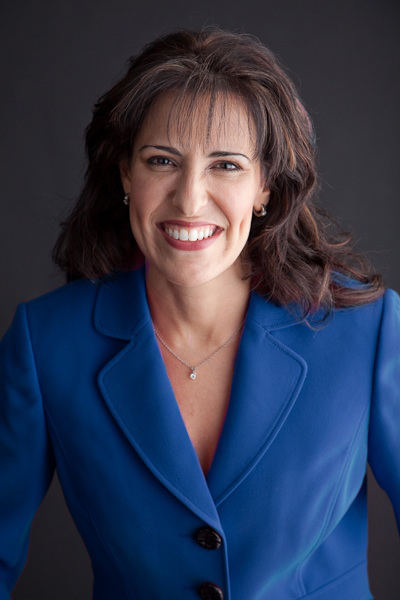

Member of the California State Assembly from the 29th district
- In office December 6, 2010 – November 30, 2012
- Preceded by: Michael Villines
- Succeeded by: Jim Patterson (redistricted to 23rd)

Personal details
- Born: June 30, 1968 (age 58) Fresno, California, U.S.
- Party: Republican
- Education: University of Illinois
- Profession: General surgeon

Linda Halderman (June 30, 1968) is an American politician who served in the California State Assembly. She is a Republican.

== Background ==
Linda Halderman is a board-certified General Surgeon who specializes in breast cancer diagnosis and treatment. Halderman graduated Phi Beta Kappa with a bachelor's degree in English from the University of Illinois. After earning a Medical Degree from Hahnemann University in Philadelphia, she completed residency training at the University of California, San Francisco-Fresno general surgery program.

== Tenure in Assembly ==
Halderman was elected to the California State Assembly in 2010 with 67.4% of the votes. While serving in the legislature, she stated that she was sexually harassed by Democratic state Senator Robert Hertzberg. She claimed that over two months, he repeatedly hugged her closely and rubbed his groin against her. When she complained to the Assembly's Chief Administrator, he dismissed her complaints and no action was taken against the Senator.

Discouraged, Halderman did not seek reelection in 2012.
