= Hueyatlaco =

Archeological site in Mexico

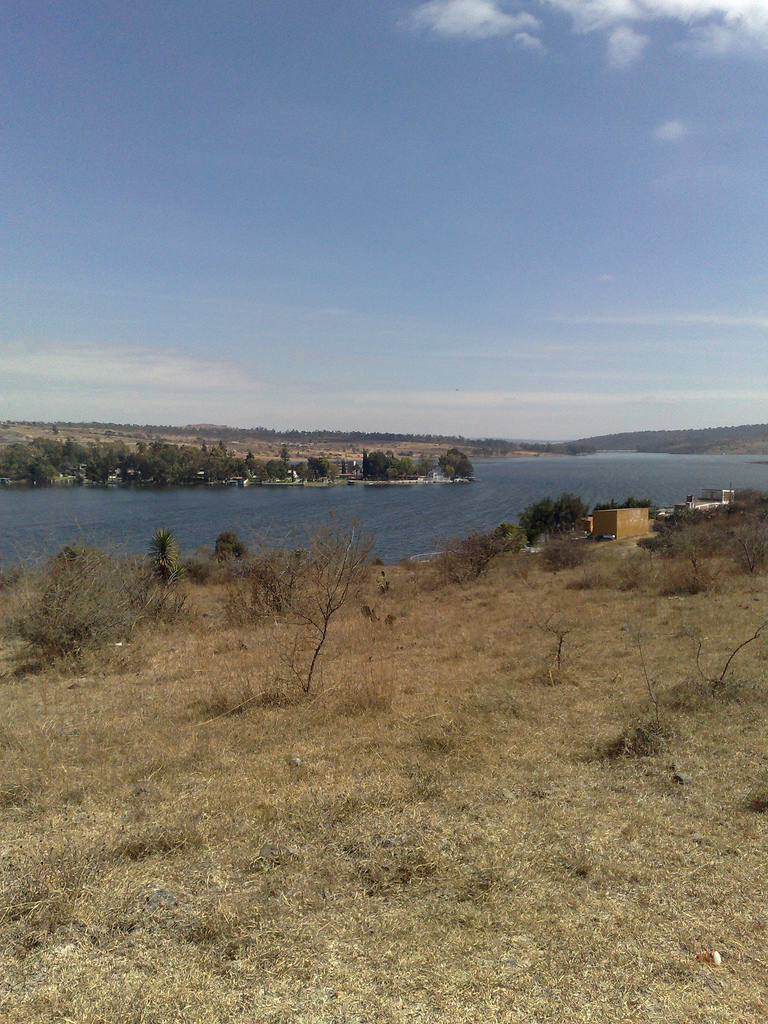
Valsequillo, area of the findings.

Hueyatlaco is an archeological site in the Valsequillo Basin near the city of Puebla, Mexico. After excavations in the 1960s, the site became notorious due to geochronologists' analyses, which have found wildly contradictory estimates for human habitation at Hueyatlaco dating from ca. 370,000 to 25,000 years before present (ybp).

If correct, these controversial findings would substantially exceed the previous oldest-known evidence for habitation of the New World (the White Sands footprints dating to roughly 22,000 ybp). The findings at Hueyatlaco are the subject of continued debate by the scientific community, and have seen only occasional discussion in the literature.

== Excavation overview ==
Cynthia Irwin-Williams led the team that first excavated the site in 1962. The site was discovered by Juan Armenta Camacho in 1960 and received media attention. The dig is often associated with Virginia Steen-McIntyre because of her continued efforts to publicize her findings and opinions. She joined the team in 1966 as a graduate student, at the request of project geologist Harold E. (Hal) Malde. It is also associated with the U.S. Geological Survey.

The region, located about 75 miles southeast of Mexico City, was known for its abundance of animal fossils, and Irwin-Williams described Hueyatlaco as a "kill site" where animals were hunted and butchered.

Excavations were conducted via standard protocols, including securing the sites to prevent trespass or accidental disturbances. During excavation, investigators discovered numerous stone tools. The tools ranged from relatively primitive implements at a smaller associated site, to more sophisticated items such as scrapers and double-edged blades uncovered at the main excavation site. The diversity of tools made from non-local materials suggested that the region had been used by multiple groups over a considerable period.

== Early controversy ==
In 1967, Jose L. Lorenzo of the Instituto Nacional de Antropología e Historia claimed that implements had been planted at the site by local laborers in such a way as to make it difficult or impossible to determine which artifacts were discovered in situ and which were planted. Irwin-Williams counter-argued that Lorenzo's claims were malicious and without merit. Furthermore, in 1969 Irwin-Williams cited statements of support from three prominent archeologists and anthropologists (Richard MacNeish, Hannah Marie Wormington and Frederick Alvin Peterson) who had each visited the site independently and attested to the integrity of the excavations and the professionalism of the group's methodology.

== First dating publication ==
In mid-1969, B.J. Szabo, Malde and Irwin-Williams published their first paper about dating the excavation site. The stone tools were discovered in situ in a stratum that also contained animal remains. Radiocarbon dating of the animal remains produced an age of over 35,000 ybp. Uranium dating produced an age of 260,000 ybp, give or take 60,000 years.

The authors stated no definitive explanation for the anomalous results. Malde suggested the tool-bearing strata had possibly been eroded by an ancient streambed, thus combining older and newer strata and complicating dating.

== Anomaly resolution attempts ==
In 1973, Virginia Steen-MacIntyre, Malde and Roald Fryxell returned to Hueyatlaco to re-examine the geographic strata and more accurately determine an age for the tool-bearing strata. They were able to rule out Malde's streambed hypothesis. Moreover, the team undertook an exhaustive analysis of volcanic ash and pumice from the original excavation site and the surrounding region. Using the zircon Fission track dating method, geochemist C.W. Naeser dated samples of ash from Hueyatlaco's tool-bearing strata to 370,000 ybp +/- 240,000 years.

The confirmation of an anomalously distant age for human habitation at the Hueyatlaco site led to tension between Irwin-Williams and the other team members. Malde and Fryxell announced the findings at a Geological Society of America meeting, admitting that they could not account for the anomalous results. Irwin-Williams responded by describing their announcement as "irresponsible". Given the substantial margin of error for the fission-track findings, and the then-new method of uranium dating, Irwin-Williams asserted that Hueyatlaco had not been accurately dated to her satisfaction.

== Delays ==
For the next several years, the excavation team were often at odds as they discussed how to move forward with the Hueyatlaco findings. Malde and Steen-McIntyre argued that the 200,000 ybp findings were valid, while Irwin-Williams argued in favor of a more recent—though still somewhat controversial—figure of 20,000 ybp. Webb and Clark suggest that her promoting the 20,000 ybp date is "particularly puzzling", as it was unsupported by any evidence the team uncovered.

The delays forced Steen-McIntyre to write her doctoral dissertation not on Hueyatlaco as planned, but rather on the dating of volcanic ash in geographic strata.

Despite leading the original excavations, Irwin-Williams never published a final report on the site.

== Quaternary Research publication ==
In 1981, the journal Quaternary Research published a paper by Steen-McIntyre, Fryxell and Malde that defended an anomalously distant age of human habitation at Hueyatlaco. The paper reported the results of four sophisticated independent tests: uranium-thorium dating, fission track dating, tephra hydration dating and the studying of mineral weathering to determine the date of the artifacts. These tests, among other data, validated a date of 250,000 ybp for the Hueyatlaco artifacts. They wrote:

"The evidence outlined here consistently indicates that the Hueyatlaco site is about 250,000 yr. old. We who have worked on geological aspects of the Valsequillo area are painfully aware that so great an age poses an archeological dilemma [...] In our view, the results reported here widen the window of time in which serious investigation of the age of Man in the New World would be warranted. We continue to cast a critical eye on all the data, including our own."

== Aftermath ==
In a letter to Quaternary Research, Irwin-Williams objected to several points in the article by Steen-McIntyre et al.; Malde and Steen-McIntyre responded with a point-by-point rebuttal.

Steen-McIntyre claims that some of the original research team were harassed, viewed as incompetent, or saw their careers hampered due to their involvement in such a controversial and anomalous investigation.

In 1990, Frison and Walker discuss possible pre-clovis sites dating to perhaps 20,000 ybp but argued against human habitation of Hueyatlaco ca. 250,000 ybp. They argue that the stone tools found at the site are "entirely too modern" to have possibly been manufactured by hominids of that era, and that the animal remains at the site are consistent with fauna that thrived no earlier than the Last Glacial Maximum ca. 18,000 to 20,000 ybp.

Biostratigraphic researcher Sam VanLandingham has published two peer-reviewed analyses that confirm the earlier findings of ca. 250,000 ybp for the tool-bearing strata at Hueyatlaco. His 2004 analysis found that Hueyatlaco samples could be dated to the Sangamonian Stage (ca. 80,000 to 220,000 ybp) by the presence of multiple diatom species, one of which first appeared during this era and others that became extinct by the era's end. VanLandingham's 2006 paper refined and re-confirmed his 2004 findings.

In 2008 during a Geological Society of America conference, Joseph Liddicoat presented paleomagnetic research into the volcanic ash at Hueyatlaco. The ash was dated to sometime after the Brunhes–Matuyama reversal, ca. 780,000 ybp.

== See also ==
- Xalnene Tuff footprints
- Cerutti Mastodon site

== Bibliography ==
Hardaker, Chris The First American: the suppressed history of the people who discovered the New World, Career Press, 2007
