= Bruce F. Allen =

American politician (1917–1986)

Member of the California State Assembly from the 29th district
- In office January 5, 1953 – January 7, 1963
- Preceded by: Charles Gubser
- Succeeded by: John C. Williamson

Personal details
- Born: Bruce Franklin Allen; August 17, 1917 San Jose, California
- Died: April 13, 1986 (aged 68) Los Gatos, California
- Party: Republican
- Spouse: Darella Steward (m. 1943)
- Children: 3

Military service
- Branch/service: United States Army
- Battles/wars: World War II

Bruce Franklin Allen (August 17, 1917 – April 13, 1986) was a Republican, and served in the California State Assembly from 1953 through 1963. As a legislator, he authored AB700 (1959) that provided a method to grade gasoline for the purpose of informing motorists. From 1966 to 1984, he was a Santa Clara Superior Court Judge. He served in the United States Army during World War II.
