= William M. Ketchum =

American politician

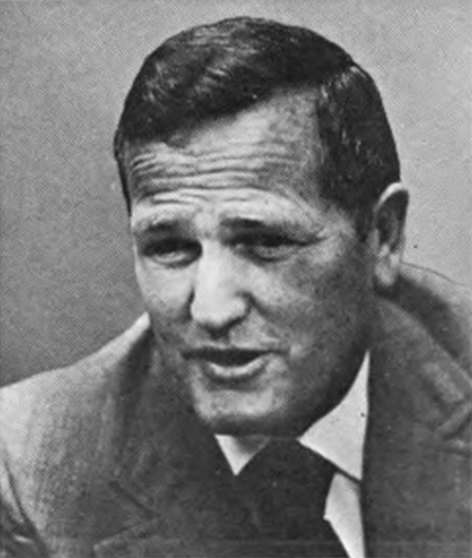

Member of the U.S. House of Representatives from California
- In office January 3, 1973 – June 24, 1978
- Preceded by: New Constituency (Redistricting)
- Succeeded by: Bill Thomas
- Constituency: 36th district (1973–75); 18th district (1975–78)

Member of the California State Assembly from the 29th district
- In office January 2, 1967 – January 3, 1973
- Preceded by: John C. Williamson
- Succeeded by: Bob Nimmo

Personal details
- Born: William Matthew Ketchum; September 2, 1921 Los Angeles, California, U.S.
- Died: June 24, 1978 (aged 56) Bakersfield, California, U.S.
- Party: Republican
- Education: Colorado School of Mines; University of Southern California

William Matthew Ketchum (September 2, 1921 – June 24, 1978) was an American businessman and Republican Party politician who was a member of the California State Assembly from 1967 to 1973 and a member of the United States House of Representatives from 1973 until his death.

== Early life ==
Ketchum was born on September 2, 1921, in Los Angeles, California. He was educated at schools in Los Angeles County and military school in North Hollywood, California, before attending the Colorado School of Mines from 1939 to 1940, and the University of Southern California from 1940 to 1942.

=== Military ===
He entered the United States Army in 1942 and served in the Pacific before his discharge in 1946. Ketchum was recalled into service during the Korean War and served from 1950 to 1953.

== Career ==
Ketchum owned and operated a hardware and auto-supply store from 1946 to 1950, and worked as a salesman from 1953 to 1957. He engaged in cattle ranching and farming, and was a member of the Republican State Central committee from 1964 to 1966.

He served in the California Assembly from 1967 to 1973, and as a delegate to the 1968 Republican National Convention.

=== Congress ===
In 1972, he was elected to the first of three consecutive terms in Congress, defeating his Democratic opponent Timothy Lemucci by 12 percentage points. He was reelected twice but died in office before completing his third term.

== Death ==
On June 24, 1978, Ketchum had a heart attack at his home in Bakersfield, California, and was pronounced dead on arrival at Kern Medical Center, aged 56.

== Electoral history ==
1972 United States House of Representatives elections in California
Party	Candidate	Votes	%
Republican	William M. Ketchum	87,984	52.7
Democratic	Timothy Lemucchi	72,516	43.5
American Independent	William M. "Bill" Armour	6,307	3.8
Total votes		166,807	100.0
Republican hold			

1974 United States House of Representatives elections in California
Party	Candidate	Votes	%
Republican	William M. Ketchum (inc.)	66,603	52.7
Democratic	George A. Seielstad	59,931	47.3
Total votes		126,534	100.0
Turnout			
Republican hold			

1976 United States House of Representatives elections in California
Party	Candidate	Votes	%
Republican	William M. Ketchum (inc.)	101,658	64.2
Democratic	Dean Close	56,683	35.8
Total votes		158,341	100.0
Turnout			
Republican hold			

== See also ==
- List of members of the United States Congress who died in office (1950–1999)

U.S. House of Representatives
Preceded by Bob Wilson	Member of the U.S. House of Representatives from California's 36th congressional district 1973 – 1975	Succeeded by George Brown, Jr.
Preceded by Bob Mathias	Member of the U.S. House of Representatives from California's 18th congressional district 1975 – 1978	Succeeded by Bill Thomas
