= Cerutti Mastodon site =

Fossil site in San Diego County, California

Coordinates: 32°39′57.4″N 117°03′11.4″W

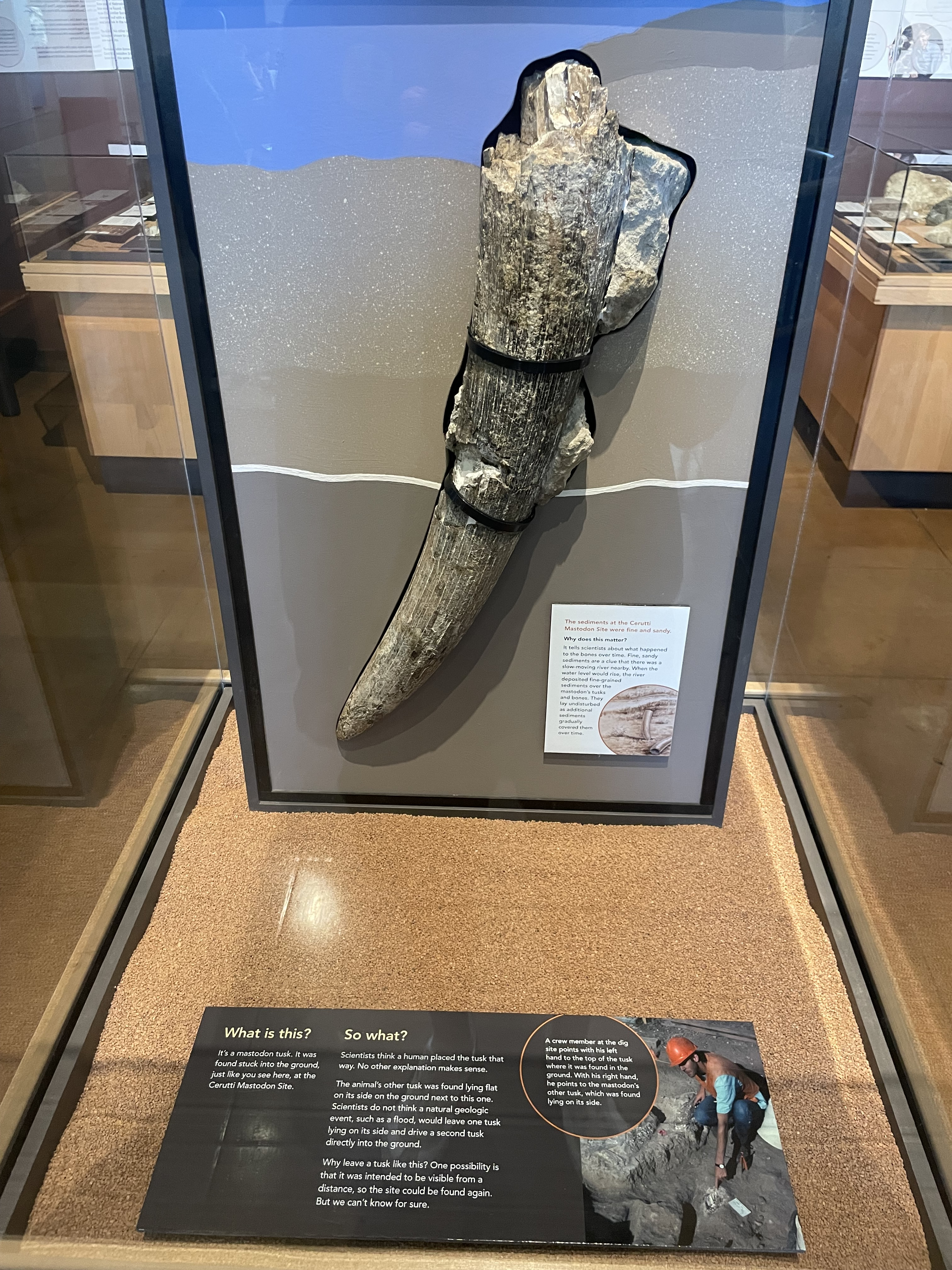
Mastodon tusk from the site, found in an upright position

The Cerutti Mastodon site is a paleontological and possible archeological site in San Diego County, California. In 2017, broken mastodon bones at the site were dated to around 130,700 years ago.

The bones were found with cobblestones displaying use-wear and impact marks among the otherwise fine-grain sands. Researchers have proposed that these marks were caused by the intentional breakage of the broken bones by hominins using the cobblestones. If true, that would be older by far than the scientific consensus for habitation of the New World, which generally traces widespread human migration to the Americas to 19,000 to 26,000 years ago, and tens of thousands of years earlier than any modern human sites outside of Africa.

== Context ==
The Cerutti Mastodon site (SDNHM locality 3767) is a paleontological site located in San Diego County, California, United States. A team of researchers from the San Diego Natural History Museum, led by Thomas Deméré, excavated the site from 1992 to 1993. The site is named after Richard Cerutti, another paleontologist from the museum who is credited with discovering the site during freeway expansion of State Route 54. Before the expansion, the site was a hilly ridge that ran parallel to the freeway. The site was found approximately nine feet down under "unnamed Pleistocene stream deposits".

Construction used a Caterpillar 235C excavator, which has a reach of 39.4 feet and a downward dig of 26.4 feet at ground level. The site was found during the construction of a drainage system. Excavated materials were placed at the base of the sound berm towards the east after which the bones were found and hand excavation followed.

== Findings ==
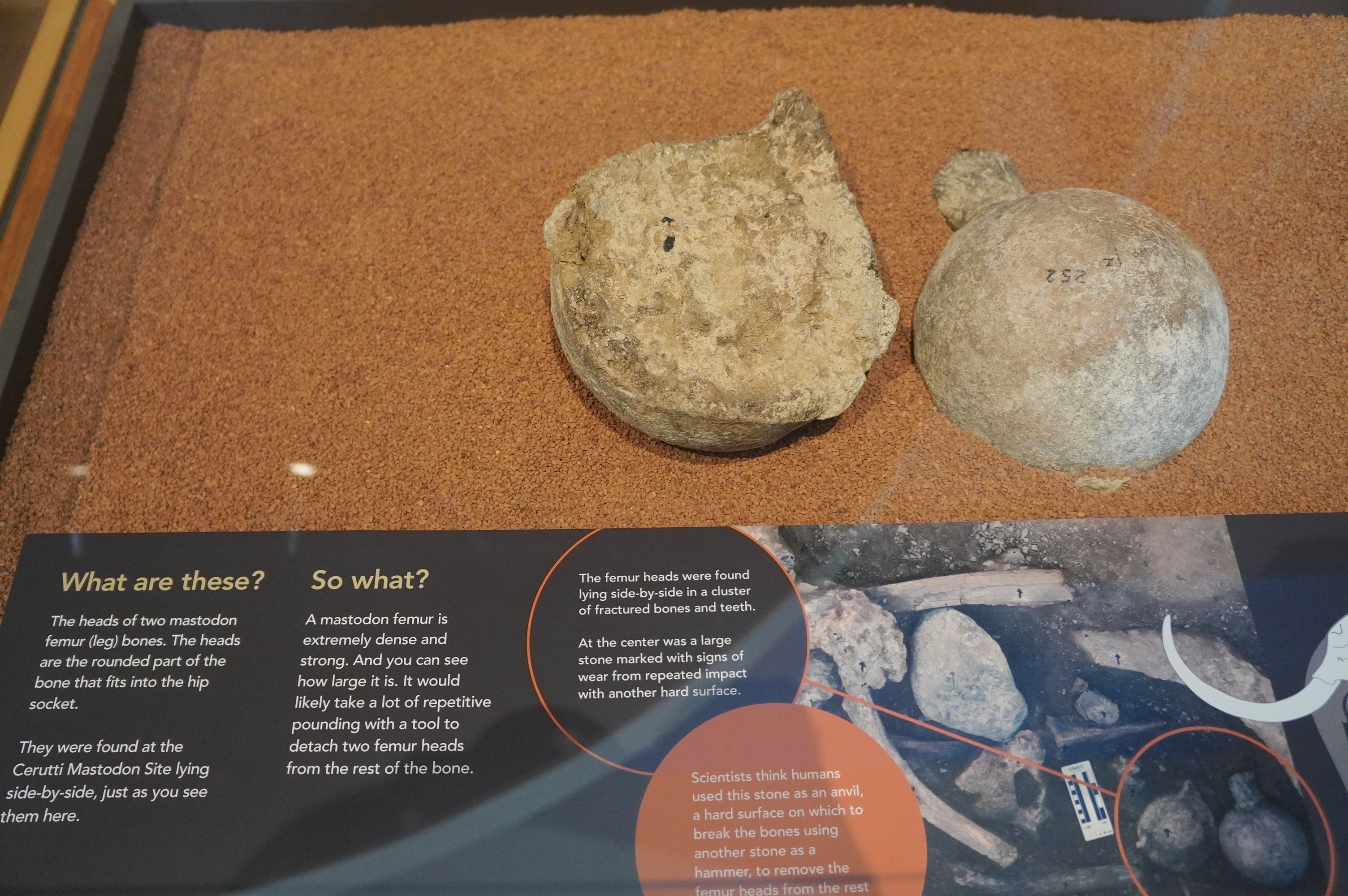
Femur heads from the site

The fossil remains of a juvenile male Mammut americanum (SDNHM 49926) were discovered in stratigraphic layer Bed E, including 2 tusks, 3 molars, 4 vertebrae, 16 ribs, 2 phalanx bones, 2 sesamoids and over 300 other bone fragments. Remains of dire wolf, horse, camel, mammoth and ground sloth were also found. Five cobbles displaying use-wear and impact marks were also recovered from the site in Bed E.

The research team found cobbles and broken mastodon bones lying together at the site. Uranium-thorium dating of the bones gives a date of around 130,700 (±9,400) years ago. The research team claims that the cobbles found at the site were used as hammerstones and anvils. The research team also claims that the mastodon bones show signs of intentional breakage by hominins. If so, this would indicate that some form of Homo was present in the Americas at an extremely early date.

Analysis from the research team states that the spiral fracturing of the different fragments suggests that the impact occurred when they were fresh and that there is also evidence of percussion. They also state that due to their distribution and occurrence this breakage most likely occurred at the site where they were buried. They suggest that the evidence shows that humans who had manual dexterity and experience with hammerstones and anvils extracted marrow from the mastodon limb bones or raw material to use for tool production. The wear and impact marks on the five cobbles were also compared with features on hammerstones and anvils that had been used in bone breakage experiments to help determine if it was likely they were used in this way.

== Criticism ==
Hominin timeline
| ← / Earlier apes; ← / Gorilla split; ← / Chimpanzee split; ← / Earliest bipedal; ← / Earliest sign of Ardipithecus; ← / Earliest sign of Australopithecus; ← / Earliest stone tools; ← / Earliest sign of Homo; ← / Dispersal beyond Africa; ← / Earliest fire / cooking; ← / Earliest rock art; ← / Earliest clothes; ← / Modern humans |
(million years ago)

The dating of the peopling of the Americas is a very contentious subject. For most of the 20th Century, the Clovis First theory was dominant, dating human habitation of the Americas to no earlier than 13,000 years ago. Later data pushed back the date from Clovis First, with theories suggesting dates of approximately 15,000 to 24,000 years ago. Other theories proposed dates as early as 40,000 years ago.

A 2017 study concluded that "by around 15–14,000 cal BP an ice-free corridor formed between the Laurentide and Cordilleran ice sheets potentially allowing humans to disperse from Beringia to continental North America; arguably, this corridor wouldn't have been biologically viable for human migration before ca. 13–12,500 cal BP, however [77–79]. It is now more widely recognized that the first inhabitants of Beringia probably dispersed along a Pacific coastal route, possibly as early as ca. 16,000 cal BP, and settled south of the ice sheets before the ice-free corridor became a viable route [3–12,77–79]."

Given the substantial differences between these theories and the Cerutti findings, some researchers responded with skepticism. Several critics have argued that the evidence from the site did not definitively rule out the possibility that the cobbles may have been altered due to natural causes. Other critics also cite the lack of lithic artifacts and debris, generally found at sites associated with lithic tool manufacturing, at the Cerutti Mastodon site. Archaeologists also cite the lack of taphonomic evidence at the site, evidence that is generally required to support claims of material culture.

No human bones were found, and the claims of tools and bone processing have been described as "not plausible". Michael R. Waters commented, "To demonstrate such early occupation of the Americas requires the presence of unequivocal stone artefacts. There are no unequivocal stone tools associated with the bones... this site is likely just an interesting paleontological locality." Chris Stringer said that "extraordinary claims require extraordinary evidence - each aspect requires the strongest scrutiny," adding that "High and concentrated forces must have been required to smash the thickest mastodon bones, and the low energy depositional environment seemingly provides no obvious alternative to humans using the heavy cobbles found with the bones."

Another 2017 paper by eight anthropologists including Tom Dillehay, David J. Meltzer, Richard Klein, Vance T. Holliday, and Jon M. Erlandson pointed out the ample supply of good stone for making tools in the area, saying that "the absence of clearly modified chipped stone tools at the CML is damning". They argued that nothing has yet been found to prove that there were hominins in the Americas before ~50 kya.

The claim that the stone tools were created by a human was also challenged by a former Caltrans land surveyor, who suggested that the site was affected by heavy earth moving construction. Ferrell believes that "the raking of the steel teeth on the excavator bucket across the site dragged the cobbles identified as anvils and hammer stones onto the site from the north, and could also account for the fragmentation of some of those cobbles, and the molar which was broken into three parts". Furthermore, he states that the impact of the dump trucks would have had "compressive and distorting effects on the sediments and materials enclosed in them" It has further been argued that the man-made fractures on the remains themselves were a result of the construction.

Thomas Deméré, in response to critiques, states that many of the critics have not examined the bones themselves and that their critique is based on "long-distance interpretations of our data" and that other hypotheses do not take into account all of the evidence found.

== Follow-up study ==
A 2020 paper by Luc Bordes, Elspeth Hayes, Richard Fullager and Tom Deméré supported the suggestion made in the original study that the cobbles were intentionally used by hominins to break the mastodon bones. This new data has identified bone micro-residues on cobbles pegmatite CM-254 and andesite CM-281. The micro residues were only found on the upward facing surface of the cobbles while there was no residue found on the downward facing surfaces. The surfaces of the cobbles that showed no wear also had no traces of micro residue, showing that the bones were only in contact with some surfaces of the cobbles. The authors claimed that this meant that the contact had to be forceful enough to transfer residue, whereas residue would completely coat the cobbles had the transfer been as a result of environmental exposure. They state that the bone residue and the damaged surface of the cobbles occur under a carbonate crust that develops over time and therefore, this leads them to believe that the bone residue was transferred to the cobbles when the site was formed around 130,700 years ago. The authors concluded that these cobbles served as hammers and anvils in order to break the bones which is consistent with the original findings. Other authors still expressed skepticism, continuing to contend that the supposed anthropogenic nature of the site was actually the result of road construction.

== See also ==
- Bluefish Caves
- Calico Early Man Site
- Pedra Furada
- Hueyatlaco
- Settlement of the Americas
