= Harrison W. Call =

American politician (1898–1975)

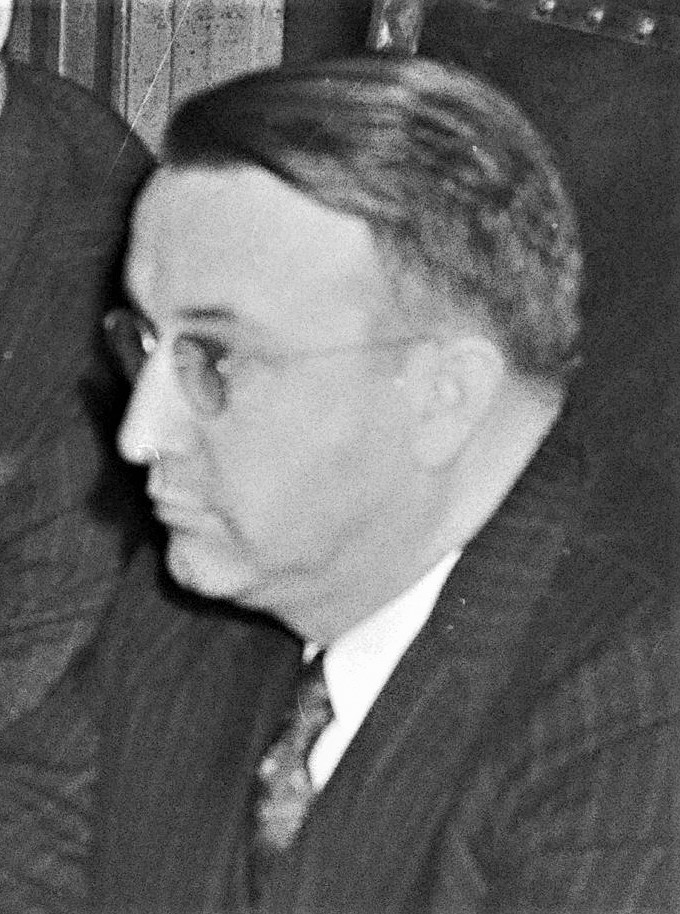
- Call in 1940

Member of the California State Assembly from the 29th district
- In office January 4, 1937 - January 4, 1943
- Preceded by: Frederick Peterson
- Succeeded by: John F. Thompson

Member of the California State Assembly from the 27th district
- In office January 4, 1943 - January 6, 1947
- Preceded by: Albert Charles Wollenberg
- Succeeded by: Richard J. Dolwig

Personal details
- Born: January 5, 1898 Farmington, New Mexico
- Died: August 29, 1975 (aged 77) North Highlands, California
- Party: Republican
- Spouse: Stella Beutler (m. 1927)
- Children: 1

Military service
- Branch/service: United States Army
- Battles/wars: Pancho Villa Expedition

Harrison W. Call (January 5, 1898 - August 29, 1975) served in the California State Assembly for the 29th and 27th district from 1937 to 1947. He served in the United States Army in the Mexican Expedition (1916–1917) and World War I.
