= Mike Briggs (politician) =

American politician (1959–2025)

Member of the California State Assembly from the 29th district
- In office December 7, 1998 - November 30, 2002
- Preceded by: Chuck Poochigian
- Succeeded by: Steven N. Samuelian

Personal details
- Born: January 23, 1959 Fresno, California, U.S.
- Died: August 31, 2025 (aged 66)
- Party: Republican
- Spouse: Robin
- Children: Three

Mike E. Briggs (January 23, 1959 – August 31, 2025) was an American politician from California and a member of the Republican Party (GOP). Briggs was elected to the Fresno City Council in 1994, succeeding Brian Setencich, who resigned a month before his term ended to take his seat in the California State Assembly. Briggs became the second Fresno City Councilman in history to rise to a higher office when he won election to the California State Assembly in 1998 from the Fresno-based 29th district, succeeding Chuck Poochigian, who made a successful run for the California State Senate.

At the end of his second term, Briggs decided to run for the newly created 21st congressional district rather than to seek reelection to the legislature. Former Fresno mayor and now Assemblyman Jim Patterson entered the race, dividing the vote in the Fresno County portion of the district, delivering the seat to Tulare County candidate Devin Nunes who held the seat until 2022.

Briggs died on August 31, 2025, from cancer at the age of 66.

California Assembly
Preceded by Chuck Poochigian	California State Assembly, 29th District; December 7, 1998 – November 30, 2002	Succeeded by Steven N. Samuelian
