= Charlene Zettel =

American politician

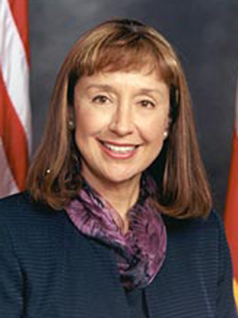
- Official portrait, 2001

Member of the California State Assembly from the 75th district
- In office December 7, 1998 – November 30, 2002
- Preceded by: Jan Goldsmith
- Succeeded by: George Plescia

Personal details
- Born: Charlene Gonzales; May 26, 1947 (age 79) Los Angeles, California, U.S.
- Party: Republican
- Spouse: David Zettel (m. 1970)
- Children: 2
- Education: University of Southern California

Charlene Zettel (née Gonzales; born May 26, 1947) is an American politician who serves on the California Fair Political Practices Commission (FPPC). She served in the California State Assembly from 1999 until 2002.

Zettel was born in East Los Angeles, California. She attended Flintridge Sacred Heart Academy in La Canada-Flintridge and then earned her bachelor's degree in dental hygiene from University of Southern California, where she was one of the original USC Song Girls. While serving in the State Assembly, Zettel worked for the passage of "Oliver's Law", which provides parents with information about day care providers. She was also the first Republican Latina elected to the State Assembly. She stepped down with one term to go before term limits would have claimed her in order to run for the California State Senate, but lost that election to Dennis Hollingsworth, who claimed 54% of the vote while Zettel claimed 46%.

Zettel was appointed the Director of the Department of Consumer Affairs in March 2004 by California Governor Arnold Schwarzenegger. She was appointed University of California Regent by Governor Schwarzenegger in 2009 and served until her term expired on March 1, 2021. In 2009, Zettel was appointed director for the San Diego Office of the Governor. She was also a board member of the San Diego Regional Airport Authority for two years and a former public interest director of the Federal Home Loan Bank of San Francisco. Zettel served as CEO of Donate Life California, the state's organ, eye, and tissue directory, from October 2011 to January 2015. In 2025, Zettel was appointed to the FPPC by State Controller Malia M. Cohen.

Zettel met her husband David Zettel at USC and married in 1970; the couple has two adult sons.
