= Xalnene Tuff footprints =

Geological academic controversy

The Xalnene Tuff footprints are a geological academic controversy, concerning a 2005 discovery of 269 markings in a geological layer in the Valsequillo Basin, south of the city of Puebla, Mexico, which were originally interpreted to be human and animal footprints. The layer was variously dated to 40,000 years Before Present (BP) or 1.3 million years BP, both dates significantly before the currently accepted date for the settlement of the Americas. A 2010 study argues that the marks were made by recent mining activities.

== Past theories ==
The Clovis people were at one time considered to be the first inhabitants of the Americas, migrating into the area 13,100 years BP. However, tools, bone structures, genetics, and languages indicate that the early Americans were from many origins, and there have been some sites dated to 15–16,000 years BP.

== Methodology ==
Carbon dating techniques were used.

== Implications of the discovery ==
Implications of the find by González et al. are that other colonisation dates that are long before Clovis need to be re-evaluated. As it is rare to find human and animal prints, these could add to the literature and experience of footprints – González et al. recommended a further study could be undertaken on the Xalnene markings. The Xalnene markings could shed light on the controversially dated Valsequillo Gravels megafauna remains, which are mostly mineralised and cannot be radiocarbon dated directly. If the Xalnene footprints are part of a migration route, the potential route could be mapped and further studies undertaken to find more evidence of human colonisation of the Americas at this time.

== Rebuttal ==
Renne et al. used argon-argon dating and palaeomagnetic data suggesting that the layer in which the footprints are preserved is 1.30±0.03 million years old, rather than the 40,000 years suggested by González et al. Renne suggested the marks were pick marks from nearby mining operations. As a result of this, while the editor decided to publish the original paper with a postscript pointing others to Renne's paper, some coauthors of the Gonazalez paper decided to withdraw their names from the publication.

== Later research ==
Gonzalez initially felt that the footprint marks could be differentiated from old quarry marks. Argon-Argon dating may be contaminated by olivine including older argon. Xenocrysts and phenocrysts were removed in a later dating of the ash material by Mark et al. 2010, which confirmed Renne's proposed age for the Xalnene Tuff. A re-examination of whether the features were footprints was conducted by Morse et al. 2010. A comparison with other markings thought to be footprints was undertaken, from various species of humans and in varying substrates and ages. This suggested that the marks were made by recent mining activity using picks. "The picks produce a spalling effect which removes material more widely around the point of impact," says Morse. "Actual pick marks are visible in the quarry but this spalling seems to have caused the print-like depressions with their 'mid-foot' deep points."

== See also ==
- Hueyatlaco
