= Frederick Peterson (politician) =

American politician

Member of the California State Assembly from the 29th district
- In office January 2, 1933 - January 4, 1937
- Preceded by: Harry F. Morrison
- Succeeded by: Harrison W. Call

Personal details
- Born: October 15, 1878 Berlin-Mitte, Germany
- Died: January 7, 1970 (aged 91) Palo Alto, California
- Party: Republican
- Spouse: Gladys
- Children: 1

Military service
- Branch/service: United States Army
- Battles/wars: World War I

Frederick Peterson (October 15, 1878 - January 7, 1970) served in the California State Assembly for the 29th district from 1933 to 1937. During World War I he also served in the United States Army.
