= California's 29th State Assembly district =

American legislative district

Current assemblymember
Robert Rivas; D–Hollister
- Population (2020) • Voting age • Citizen voting age: 495,410; 495,410; 357,685
- Demographics: 18.73% White; 0.93% Black; 72.63% Latino; 4.55% Asian; 0.27% Native American; 0.17% Hawaiian/Pacific Islander; 0.45% other; 2.26% remainder of multiracial
- Registered voters: 242,268
- Registration: 50.84% Democratic; 21.51% Republican; 21.20% No party preference

California's 29th State Assembly district is one of 80 California State Assembly districts. It is currently represented by Democrat Robert Rivas of Hollister, the Speaker of the California State Assembly.

== Election results from statewide races ==
Year	Office	Results
2021	Recall	No 72.9 – 27.1%
2020	President	Biden 73.6 – 23.8%
2018	Governor	Newsom 70.9 – 29.1%
2018	Senator	Feinstein 57.4 – 42.6%
2016	President	Clinton 70.0 – 23.0%
2016	Senator	Harris 71.1 – 28.9%
2014	Governor	Brown 73.4 – 26.6%
2012	President	Obama 69.9 – 26.7%
2012	Senator	Feinstein 72.5 – 27.5%

== List of assembly members representing the district ==
Due to redistricting, the 29th district has been moved around different parts of the state. The current iteration resulted from the 2021 redistricting by the California Citizens Redistricting Commission.

Assembly members	Party	Years served	Counties represented	Notes
James H. Daley	Republican	January 5, 1885 - January 3, 1887	San Francisco	
James B. Brown	Republican	January 3, 1887 – January 7, 1889	San Francisco	
Thomas Mulvey	Democratic	January 7, 1889 – January 5, 1891	San Francisco	
James H. Daley	Republican	January 5, 1891 – January 2, 1893	San Francisco	
W. T. Boyce	Democratic	January 2, 1893 – January 7, 1895	San Francisco	
J. D. Coghlin	Democratic	January 7, 1895 – January 4, 1897	San Francisco	
John Allen	Fusion	January 4, 1897 – January 2, 1899	San Francisco	
Charles F. Kenneally	Republican	January 2, 1899 – January 1, 1901	San Francisco	
Jeremiah F. Collins	Republican	January 1, 1901 – January 5, 1903	San Francisco	
Thomas F. Finn	Democratic	January 5, 1903 – January 2, 1905	San Francisco	
John A. Cullen	Republican	January 2, 1905 – January 2, 1911	San Francisco	
Daniel Rimlinger	Republican	January 2, 1911 – January 6, 1913	San Francisco	
Ignatius A. Richardson	Democratic	January 6, 1913 – January 4, 1915	San Francisco	
James J. Byrnes	Democratic	January 4, 1915 – January 8, 1917	San Francisco	
Harry F. Morrison	Republican	January 8, 1917 – January 2, 1933	San Francisco	
Frederick Peterson	Republican	January 2, 1933 – January 4, 1937	San Mateo	
Harrison W. Call	Republican	January 4, 1937 – January 4, 1943	San Mateo	
John F. Thompson	Republican	January 4, 1943 – January 8, 1951	Santa Clara	
Charles Gubser	Republican	January 8, 1951 – January 3, 1953	Santa Clara	
Bruce F. Allen	Republican	January 5, 1953 – January 7, 1963	Santa Clara	
John C. Williamson	Democratic	January 7, 1963 – January 2, 1967	Kern	
William M. Ketchum	Republican	January 2, 1967 – January 3, 1973	Kern, San Luis Obispo, Tulare	Resigned from the State Assembly after being elected to House of Representatives.
Vacant		January 3, 1973 – January 8, 1973	Kern, San Luis Obispo, Tulare	
Robert Nimmo	Republican	January 8, 1973 – November 30, 1976	Kern, San Luis Obispo, Tulare	
Robert Nimmo	Republican	January 8, 1973 – November 30, 1976	Monterey, San Luis Obispo, Santa Barbara	
Carol Boyd Hallett	Republican	December 6, 1976 – November 30, 1982	Monterey, San Luis Obispo, Santa Barbara	
Eric Seastrand	Republican	December 6, 1982 – June 20, 1990	Monterey, San Luis Obispo, Santa Barbara	Died in office. His wife ended up succeeding him.
Vacant		June 20, 1990 – December 3, 1990	Monterey, San Luis Obispo, Santa Barbara	
Andrea Seastrand	Republican	December 3, 1990 – November 30, 1992	Monterey, San Luis Obispo, Santa Barbara	
Bill Jones	Republican	December 7, 1992 – November 30, 1994	Fresno, Tulare	
Chuck Poochigian	Republican	December 5, 1994 – November 30, 1998	Fresno, Tulare	
Mike Briggs	Republican	December 7, 1998 – November 30, 2002	Fresno, Tulare	
Steven N. Samuelian	Republican	December 2, 2002 – November 30, 2004	Fresno, Tulare, Madera	
Michael Villines	Republican	December 6, 2004 – November 30, 2010	Fresno, Tulare, Madera	
Linda Halderman	Republican	December 6, 2010 – November 30, 2012	Fresno, Tulare, Madera	
Mark Stone	Democratic	December 3, 2012 – November 30, 2022	Monterey, Santa Clara, Santa Cruz	
Robert A. Rivas	Democratic	December 5, 2022 – present	Monterey, Santa Clara, Santa Cruz, San Benito	

== Election results (1990–present) ==
=== 2024 ===
2024 California State Assembly 29th district election
Primary election
Party	Candidate	Votes	%
Democratic	Robert Rivas (incumbent)	40,756	64.8
Republican	J.W. Paine	22,145	35.2
Total votes		62,901	100.0
General election
Democratic	Robert Rivas (incumbent)	99,600	66.0
Republican	J.W. Paine	51,291	34.0
Total votes		150,891	100.0
Democratic hold			

=== 2022 ===
2022 California State Assembly 29th district election
Primary election
Party	Candidate	Votes	%
Democratic	Robert Rivas (incumbent)	38,163	64.3
Republican	Stephanie L. Castro	21,148	35.7
Total votes		59,311	100.0
General election
Democratic	Robert Rivas (incumbent)	63,439	63.8
Republican	Stephanie L. Castro	36,030	36.2
Total votes		99,469	100.0
Democratic hold			

=== 2020 ===
2020 California State Assembly 29th district election
Primary election
Party	Candidate	Votes	%
Democratic	Mark Stone (incumbent)	124,519	75.8
Republican	Shomir Banerjee	39,835	24.2
Total votes		164,354	100.0
General election
Democratic	Mark Stone (incumbent)	185,496	73.0
Republican	Shomir Banerjee	68,772	27.0
Total votes		254,268	100.0
Democratic hold			

=== 2018 ===
2018 California State Assembly 29th district election
Primary election
Party	Candidate	Votes	%
Democratic	Mark Stone (incumbent)	86,641	72.4
Republican	Vicki L. Nohrden	33,073	27.6
Total votes		119,714	100.0
General election
Democratic	Mark Stone (incumbent)	147,237	71.8
Republican	Vicki L. Nohrden	57,714	28.2
Total votes		204,951	100.0
Democratic hold			

=== 2016 ===
2016 California State Assembly 29th district election
Primary election
Party	Candidate	Votes	%
Democratic	Mark Stone (incumbent)	107,770	75.0
Republican	Sierra Roberts	35,934	25.0
Total votes		143,704	100.0
General election
Democratic	Mark Stone (incumbent)	156,703	72.2
Republican	Sierra Roberts	60,245	27.8
Total votes		216,948	100.0
Democratic hold			

=== 2014 ===
2014 California State Assembly 29th district election
Primary election
Party	Candidate	Votes	%
Democratic	Mark Stone (incumbent)	58,117	68.4
Republican	Palmer Kain	26,905	31.6
Total votes		85,022	100.0
General election
Democratic	Mark Stone (incumbent)	88,265	69.4
Republican	Palmer Kain	38,903	30.6
Total votes		127,168	100.0
Democratic hold			

=== 2012 ===
2012 California State Assembly 29th district election
Primary election
Party	Candidate	Votes	%
Democratic	Mark Stone	52,471	54.0
Republican	Tom Walsh	31,476	32.4
Democratic	Bob Fultz	13,194	13.6
Total votes		97,141	100.0
General election
Democratic	Mark Stone	137,652	68.9
Republican	Tom Walsh	62,057	31.1
Total votes		199,709	100.0
Democratic gain from Republican			

=== 2010 ===
2010 California State Assembly 29th district election
Party	Candidate	Votes	%
Republican	Linda Halderman	89,016	67.4
Democratic	Michael J. Esswein	43,124	32.6
Total votes		132,140	100.0
Republican hold			

=== 2008 ===
2008 California State Assembly 29th district election
Party	Candidate	Votes	%
Republican	Michael Villines (incumbent)	110,230	65.9
Democratic	Humberto Avila	57,100	34.1
Total votes		167,330	100.0
Republican hold			

=== 2006 ===
2006 California State Assembly 29th district election
Party	Candidate	Votes	%
Republican	Mike Villines (incumbent)	76,719	65.5
Democratic	Benjamin Avila	35,163	30.0
Peace and Freedom	John Crockford	3,784	3.2
Libertarian	Jonathan Zwickel	1,479	1.3
Total votes		117,145	100.0
Republican hold			

=== 2004 ===
2004 California State Assembly 29th district election
Party	Candidate	Votes	%
Republican	Mike Villines (incumbent)	95,209	62.4
Democratic	Michael R. Macias	52,334	34.3
Green	John Crockford	5,150	3.4
Total votes		152,693	100.0
Republican hold			

=== 2002 ===
2002 California State Assembly 29th district election
Party	Candidate	Votes	%
Republican	Steven N. Samuelian	63,011	60.9
Democratic	Richard Martinez, Jr.	36,977	35.7
Libertarian	Jonathan Zwickel	3,613	3.4
Total votes		103,601	100.0
Republican hold			

=== 2000 ===
2000 California State Assembly 29th district election
Party	Candidate	Votes	%
Republican	Mike Briggs (incumbent)	102,156	70.3
Democratic	Lita Reid	38,595	26.6
Libertarian	Ron Drioane	4,486	3.1
Total votes		154,908	100.0
Republican hold			

=== 1998 ===
1998 California State Assembly 29th district election
Party	Candidate	Votes	%
Republican	Mike Briggs	83,080	91.2
No party	Bill Maze (write-in)	8,000	8.8
Total votes		91,080	100.00
Republican hold			

=== 1996 ===
1996 California State Assembly 29th district election
Party	Candidate	Votes	%
Republican	Chuck Poochigian (incumbent)	94,278	67.8
Democratic	Mike McGonigie	38,103	27.4
Natural Law	Nancy D. Adalian	6,699	4.8
Total votes		139,080	100.0
Republican hold			

=== 1994 ===
1994 California State Assembly 29th district election
Party	Candidate	Votes	%
Republican	Chuck Poochigian	81,113	67.7
Democratic	Michael E. O'Hare	38,776	32.3
Total votes		119,889	100.0
Republican hold			

=== 1992 ===
1992 California State Assembly 29th district election
Party	Candidate	Votes	%
Republican	Bill Jones (incumbent)	122,464	100.0
Total votes		122,464	100.0
Republican hold			

=== 1990 ===
1990 California State Assembly 29th district election
Party	Candidate	Votes	%
Republican	Andrea Seastrand	74,769	65.2
Democratic	John Jay Lybarger	39,905	34.8
Total votes		114,674	100.0
Republican hold			

== See also ==
- California State Assembly
- California State Assembly districts
- Districts in California
