= Michael Villines =

American politician (born 1967)

Mike Villines

Minority Leader of the California Assembly
- In office November 10, 2006 – June 1, 2009
- Preceded by: George Plescia
- Succeeded by: Sam Blakeslee

Member of the California State Assembly from the 29th district
- In office December 6, 2004 – November 30, 2010
- Preceded by: Steven N. Samuelian
- Succeeded by: Linda Halderman

Personal details
- Born: Michael N. Villines; March 30, 1967 (age 59) San Jose, California, U.S.
- Party: Republican
- Profession: Businessman
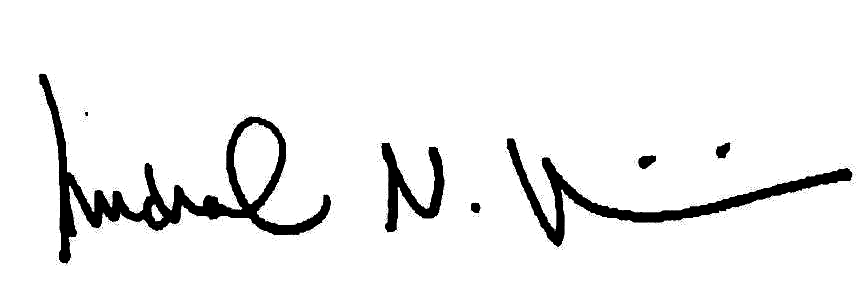
- Signature
- Website: Official web site

Michael N. Villines (born March 30, 1967) is an American businessman and former California State Assemblyman, who served from 2004 to 2010 representing the 29th district. The 29th Assembly District includes Clovis, Fresno, Madera, Orange Cove, and Shaver Lake. He served as the Assembly's Minority Leader between 2006 and 2009.

== Election to California Assembly ==
After building a public relations firm in the Fresno area, Mike Villines was elected to his first political office in the California Assembly in 2004. He received 42.9% of the vote in a Republican primary contested by three candidates and went on to easily defeat his Democratic opponent in the general election with 62.4% of the vote.

== Republican Leader ==
Villines was chosen by his colleagues in November 2006 where he served as Republican leader for 2 1/2 years, making him one of the longest serving leaders over the past 25 years (due to terms limits). He succeeded George Plescia of La Jolla. Plescia had succeeded Kevin McCarthy who stepped down to make a successful run for Congress.

Villines served as chief negotiator for Assembly Republicans, crafting solutions to the critical problems facing California. He was a member of the "Big 5" group of legislative leaders that included at the time Governor Schwarzenegger, Senate President Pro Tem Darrell Steinberg, Senate Republican Leader Dennis Hollingsworth, and Speaker of the Assembly Karen Bass. Final agreements on such important issues as how to balance the budget are reached during "Big 5" meetings.

Villines' leadership was key to the February 2009 Budget Deal, which included large spending cuts and temporary tax increases, that allowed California to reduce its $42 billion budget deficit. He was recognized by members of both political parties for his willingness to pursue a bipartisan solution to rapidly expanding crisis despite the risk to his political career. While the deal was highly unpopular at the time, Villines was awarded with the John F. Kennedy Profile in Courage Award along with fellow legislative leaders Karen Bass, Dave Cogdill and Darrell Steinberg for their role in the budget deal. The Award is the nation's most prestigious honor for elected public servants and recognizes acts that put the good of the public ahead of the individual's interests.

Villines was initially opposed to any tax increases but described his reasoning for the deal during his Profiles in Courage acceptance speech. "Now there were many who argued that doing nothing was the best option – letting the state 'go off the cliff' was the "fiscally responsible" position... For me, there was nothing more fiscally or socially irresponsible than inaction...especially when we knew the facts. I was determined not to let California fail and to the best I could to solve the problem. And so I worked with Dave, Karen, Darrell and Governor Schwarzenneger [sic] to craft a budget compromise... But in the end, we believed it was practical, fair, and the only way to get California on the road to recovery...I learned that courage is taking the hard road even when there is an easy way out. And I gained a real understanding of what politics should be – putting the interests of the people ahead of what's easy or best for my career."

== Run for Insurance Commissioner ==
In 2009, Villines became a candidate for California Insurance Commissioner. The incumbent, Steve Poizner, was leaving the office to run for governor. Villines received the 2010 Republican nomination for Insurance Commissioner over BrianFitzGerald, but lost the general election to the Democratic nominee, fellow Assemblyman Dave Jones.

Villines received the endorsement of San Francisco Chronicle for the post of Insurance Commissioner and had the follow to say "Villines has shown he can balance competing interests and is willing to take the heat for doing the right thing...The fortitude to do the right thing against immense pressure is a pretty good credential for insurance commissioner, the state officeholder charged with regulating and approving rates for homeowner and auto insurance. " He also received endorsements from the LA Daily News, Modesto Bee, Fresno Bee, Bakersfield Californian and the Merced Sun-Star.

== Priorities and recognition ==
Villines authored AB 1887 to create a high-risk pool to allow for health-care coverage for Californians with pre-existing conditions utilizing federal funds directed from the Affordable Health Care for America Act. The bill passed by receiving bipartisan support within the California Assembly and Senate and was praised for its ability to finally address the segment of the population that was unable to obtain health insurance. He is also carrying AB 2561 which creates the California Department of Energy (CDOE) and consolidates within the CDOE fragmented state energy functions and authorities to establish a coordinated body to regulate the state's energy policies.

During his legislative career, Villines has made improving California's business climate, reducing the tax burden on hard-working families and restoring common-sense solutions and accountability to state government his top priorities. He authored several bills to address during his time in the Assembly these issues. He has also been a strong advocate for a cap on general fund spending and public pension reform as solutions to the state's structural budget deficit.

In spring of 2010, he received the John F. Kennedy Profile in Courage Award along with three other California Legislators. Villines was named an "Emerging Leader" by the State Legislative Leaders Foundation.

== Education ==
Villines earned a Bachelor of Arts degree in political science at California State University, Fresno.

California Assembly
Preceded by Steven N. Samuelian	California State Assemblyman; 29th District; December 6, 2004 – November 30, 2010	Succeeded by Linda Halderman
Party political offices
Preceded by George Plescia	Minority Leader of the California State Assembly; November 10, 2006 – June 1, 2009	Succeeded by Sam Blakeslee
