= Chuck Poochigian =

American politician

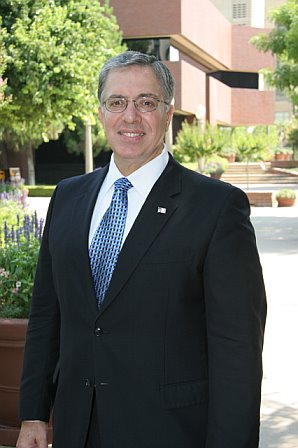

Associate Justice of the California Second District Court of Appeal, Fifth Division
- In office 2009–2025
- Appointed by: Arnold Schwarzenegger

Member of the California State Senate from the 14th district
- In office December 7, 1998 - November 30, 2006
- Preceded by: Kenneth L. Maddy
- Succeeded by: Dave Cogdill

Member of the California State Assembly from the 29th district
- In office December 5, 1994 - November 30, 1998
- Preceded by: Bill Jones
- Succeeded by: Mike Briggs

Personal details
- Born: Charles Suren Poochigian; May 19, 1949 (age 77) Fresno, California, U.S.
- Party: Republican
- Spouse: Debbie Poochigian (m. 1977)
- Children: 3
- Education: California State University, Fresno (BA); Santa Clara University (JD)
- Profession: Politician; Judge

Charles Suren "Pooch" Poochigian (born May 19, 1949) is an American jurist who served as an Associate Justice of the California Court of Appeal from 2009 to 2025. A member of the Republican Party, he is also a former California State Senator.

He campaigned unsuccessfully in 2006 for California Attorney General, losing to former Governor Jerry Brown in the November general election.

== Personal ==
Poochigian is a third generation Armenian-American resident of the San Joaquin Valley. His family has farmed there since 1912.

He received his undergraduate degree in business administration from California State University, Fresno, in 1972 and his Juris Doctor (J.D.) from Santa Clara University School of Law in 1975. From 1975 until November 1988, he practiced general civil and business law.

He served six years in the California Air National Guard.

He and his wife, Debbie, married since 1977, have three grown children.

== Career ==
=== Work for George Deukmejian ===
In 1978, Poochigian worked on the campaign of then-State Senator George Deukmejian, who was running for Attorney General.

From 1985 to 1987, Poochigian served on the California Fair Employment and Housing Commission as an appointee of Governor Deukmejian. In 1988, he was chosen to serve on the senior staff of Governor Deukmejian. Poochigian served as the Chief Deputy Appointments Secretary, assisting the Governor in the selection of key administration officials and members of over 375 state boards and commissions.

=== Work for Pete Wilson ===
In 1991, Governor Pete Wilson named him the Appointments Secretary. While serving on the Governor's senior staff and overseeing the appointments unit, he assisted the Governor in the evaluation and selection of candidates for judicial appointments.

=== California State Assemblyman (1994-1998) ===
In 1994, Poochigian was elected to the California State Assembly to represent the 29th Assembly District with 67.7% of the vote and was reelected in 1996 with 67.8% of the vote.

In his first Assembly term, he served as the chairman of the Assembly Appropriations Committee, as a member of the Republican Caucus Leadership (1995–1997), and as a member of the Budget Conference Committee (1995 and 1996). Additionally, he served as the Assembly's representative on California's Little Hoover Commission, having been appointed by both Republican and Democratic Speakers of the Assembly.

In 1996, the California Journal named him the Republican "Rookie of the Year" (out of a class of 22). The Journal also rated him among the top 5 legislators in the 80-member State Assembly in the following separate categories: Effectiveness, Integrity, Intelligence, Problem-solving, Potential, and Overall. In 1998, the California Journal also recognized him as one of the top 5 Assembly members in the categories of Integrity and Hardwork.

=== California State Senator (1998-2006) ===
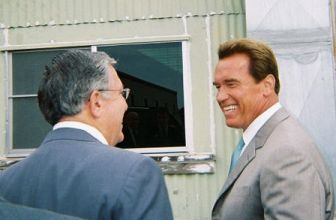
Poochigian with Arnold Schwarzenegger

In 1998, Poochigian was unopposed in seeking election to represent California's 14th Senate District, which included portions of Fresno, Tulare, and Kern Counties.

In November 2002, he was again re-elected without opposition to the reapportioned 14th Senate District which now includes all or portions of Fresno, Madera, Mariposa, San Joaquin, Stanislaus, and Tuolumne Counties.

On April 8, 2005, as a California State Senator and assistant Republican leader, Poochigian published an article in the San Diego Union-Tribune, entitled "Using the ADA to abuse the legal system" where he ridiculed the ADA requirements for basic accommodations for disability, such as grab bars around toilets and levers on doors and faucets, and referred to those requirements as "payday for shakedown artists".

In 2006, Capitol Weekly named Poochigian the most effective Senator (excluding the Pro-Tem). However, Poochigian earned a zero rating from Equality California (EQCA) for his opposition to LGBT legislation. EQCA noted that Poochigian opposed every major LGBT bill, including: AB 1001 (prohibited discrimination based on sexual orientation); AB 537 (protected LGBT children from harassment and violence in public schools); and AB 25 (established the most basic rights for same-sex domestic partners).

=== Attorney General campaign (2006) ===
In the 2006 California elections, Poochigian was defeated by Democrat Jerry Brown, the former governor of California and at the time, mayor of Oakland, for California Attorney General, receiving 38.2% of the vote, to Brown's 56.4%.

Poochigian's campaign was characterized as one of the most aggressive and creative down-ballot races in 2006. The campaign was featured by The Wall Street Journal and others for its use of emerging technology, such as MySpace, YouTube, and other online mediums, to reach out to voters and mobilize activists. One notable attack ad released by the Brown campaign voiced over by Peter Coyote stated that Poochigian had a 0% rating on the environment. The ad also made the claim that Poochigian flatly rejects "Sound Science" which caused confusion about what exactly "Sound Science" means. The National Journal's "Hotline" named the campaign one of the country's top 15 down-ballot races to watch.

A post-election Los Angeles Times article stated: "[T]he famously collegial Poochigian, 57, proved reliably feisty, hitting Brown hard for Oakland's skyrocketing murder rate and a past littered with Moonbeam moments during his long-ago stint in Sacramento and lefty pronouncements while he was a talk radio host in the 1990s."

=== Appellate Court Justice (2009) ===
On August 20, 2009, Governor Arnold Schwarzenegger nominated Poochigian to become a justice of the California Court of Appeal, Fifth Appellate District. On September 24, 2009, Poochigian was unanimously confirmed to the court by California's Commission on Judicial Appointments, consisting in this case of Chief Justice Ronald M. George, Fifth District Presiding Justice James A. Ardaiz, and Attorney General Brown. At the confirmation hearing, Chief Justice George "ripped into the commission that rated [Poochigian] "not qualified" for the post," noting that there was a "real problem in the process" used by the Commission on Judicial Nominees Evaluation, and strongly urging that there be "some revisions in the procedure." Chief Justice George and Justice Ardaiz criticized the JNE commission for disregarding its own standards and the statutory standards that are supposed to govern its processes.

Still, Poochigian's appointment was not without controversy. JNE Commission Chair Jonathan Wolf of San Francisco wrote to the Chief Justice that Poochigian “is intelligent, diligent, and articulate...and is committed to public service” but continued that in the Commission's view "Poochigian’s legal background [did] not qualify him for the appellate bench." In explaining the Commission's findings, Wolf continued, "he [Poochigian] had not practiced law for approximately 21 years and had not litigated a case in approximately the same amount of time. Moreover, he has no jury trials and no criminal law experience."

Among other groups, Poochigian's appointment was strongly opposed by the National Organization for Women and Equality California In a circulated letter opposing Mr. Poochigian's appointment, California National Organization for Women President Patricia Bellasalma wrote,"Mr. Poochigian’s long political history of being vehemently opposed to the rights of women, the LGBT community, workers and people of color in addition to having no credible legal experience qualifying him for the bench, as determined by the California State Bar, amplifies this travesty.”

Poochigian's tenure on the Court of Appeal ended in 2025.

California Senate
Preceded by Kenneth L. Maddy	California State Senator; 14th District; 1998–2006	Succeeded by Dave Cogdill
California Assembly
Preceded by Bill Jones	California State Assemblyman; 29th District; 1994–1998	Succeeded by Mike Briggs
