= Frederick Alvin Peterson =

Frederick Alvin Peterson (June 23, 1920 – April 18, 2009) was an American archaeologist and anthropologist. Peterson's research focused primarily on Mexico where he spent a majority of his professional career. Of his many published works, he is best known for co-authoring the book Ancient Mexico: an introduction to the pre-Hispanic cultures.

== Early life and education ==
Peterson was born on June 23, 1920, in Sheboygan, Wisconsin. In addition to receiving his MA in anthropology and Latin American studies at the University of the Americas (later named Mexico City College) in 1949, he also served in the army during World War II.

== Career ==
Along with his field work in Mexico, throughout the years he worked at various institutions such as Mexico City College, the University of Houston, Milwaukee Public Museum, and the New World Archaeological Foundation. For more than four decades, Peterson was a professor at the West Virginia Wesleyan College. He died on April 18, 2009, in Buckhannon, West Virginia.

== Selected works ==
- Peterson, F. A., & Franco, J. L. (1959). Ancient Mexico: an introduction to the pre-Hispanic cultures.
- MacNeish, R. S., & Peterson, F. A. (1962). The Santa Marta Rock Shelter Ocozocoautla, Chiapas, Mexico (Vol. 14). New World Archaeological Foundation, Brigham Young University.
- Peterson, F. A. (1953). Some Rare Mexican Artifacts. Journal of the Illinois State Archaeological Society, 3(3), 78–82.
- Ritzenthaler, R. E., & Peterson, F. A. (1954). Courtship Whistling of the Mexican Kickapoo Indians. American Anthropologist, 56(6), 1088–1089.
- Zenil, A. M., & Peterson, F. A. (1954). A Smiling Head Complex from Central Veracruz, Mexico. American Antiquity, 20(2), 162–169.
