= California State Assembly Republican Caucus =

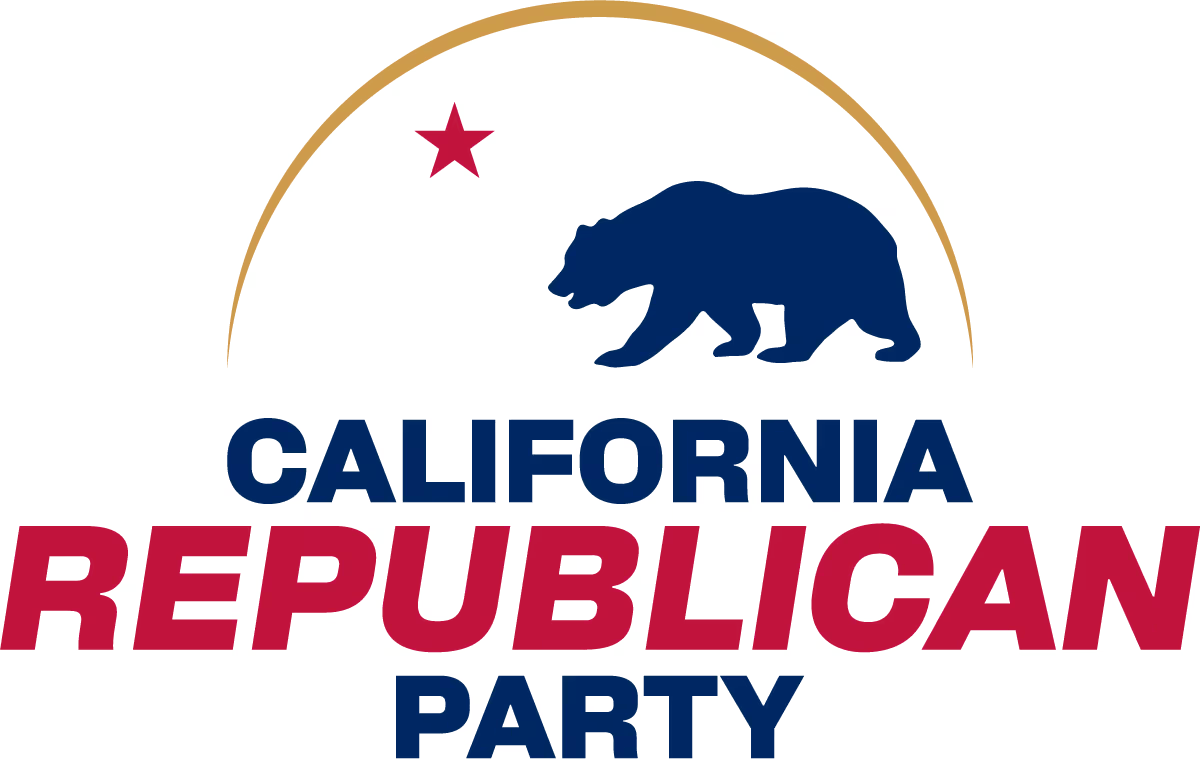
- Leader: Alexandra Macedo
- Floor Leader: Josh Hoover
- Floor Whip: David Tangipa
- Chair: Natasha Johnson
- Ideology: American conservatism
- Political position: Right-wing
- National affiliation: Republican Party (United States)
- Colors: Red
- Seats in the California State Assembly: 19 / 80

Election symbol

Website
- asmrc.org

The California State Assembly Republican Caucus is the formal organization of Republican Members in the California State Assembly, who hold 19 of its 80 seats after the 2024 general election. It is one of the Assembly's two officially recognized political party caucuses and is led by Assembly Member Alexandra Macedo, the Assembly Republican Leader (Minority Leader of the State Assembly).

== Caucus Members for the 2024–2026 term ==
District	Name	Residence	First elected	Term limited	Notes
1	Heather Hadwick	Alturas	2024	2036	
3	James Gallagher	Nicolaus	2014	2026	Minority Leader from February 8, 2022 to September 16, 2025
5	Joe Patterson	Rocklin	2022	2034	
7	Josh Hoover	Folsom	2022	2034	
8	David Tangipa	Clovis	2024	2036	
9	Heath Flora	Lodi	2016	2028	Minority Leader from September 16, 2025 to August 3, 2026
22	Juan Alanis	Modesto	2022	2034	
33	Alexandra Macedo	Tulare	2024	2036	Minority Leader from August 3, 2026
34	Tom Lackey	Palmdale	2014	2026	
36	Jeff Gonzalez	Indio	2024	2036	
47	Greg Wallis	Bermuda Dunes	2022	2034	
58	Leticia Castillo	Home Gardens	2024	2036	
59	Phillip Chen	Yorba Linda	2016	2028	
63	Bill Essayli	Corona	2022	2034	
70	Tri Ta	Westminster	2022	2034	
71	Kate Sanchez	Rancho Santa Margarita	2022	2034	
72	Diane Dixon	Newport Beach	2022	2034	
74	Laurie Davies	Laguna Niguel	2020	2032	
75	Carl DeMaio	Escondido	2024	2036	

== Caucus Leadership Positions ==
=== Current hierarchy ===
For the 2026–2027 legislative period, the California State Assembly Republican leadership team is as follows (from highest to lowest):

- Alexandra Macedo as Minority Leader (Republican Caucus Leader)
- David Tangipa as Minority Whip
- Josh Hoover as Minority Floor Leader
- Natasha Johnson as Caucus Chair
- Joe Patterson as Minority Deputy Leader (Republican Caucus Deputy Leader)

=== Caucus Leaders ===
Since 1996, the Republican Caucus Leaders have also served as the Minority Leader. the following have served as the Republican Leader:

- Charles W. Lyon, 1943-46 (Served as speaker from 1943-46)
- Sam L. Collins, 1947-52 (Served as speaker from 1947-52)
- James W. Silliman, 1953-54 (Served as speaker from 1953-54)
- Luther H. Lincoln, 1955-58 (Served as speaker from 1955-58)
- Joseph C. Shell, 1959-63
- Charles J. Conrad, 1963-64
- Robert T. Monagan, 1965-73 (Served as speaker from 1969–70)
- Robert G. Beverly, 1973-75
- Paul V. Priolo, 1976-79
- Carol Hallett, 1979-82
- Robert W. Naylor, 1982-84
- Pat Nolan, 1984-88
- Ross Johnson, 1988-91
- Bill Jones, 1991-92
- James Brulte, 1992-95
- Curt Pringle 1995-97 (Served as speaker in 1996)
- Bill Leonard, 1997-98
- Rod Pacheco, 1998-99
- Scott Baugh, 1999-2000
- Bill Campbell, 2000-01
- Dave Cox, 2001-04
- Kevin McCarthy, 2004-06
- George Plescia, 2006
- Mike Villines, 2006-09
- Sam Blakeslee, 2009-10
- Martin Garrick, 2010
- Connie Conway, 2010–2014
- Kristin Olsen, 2014-2016
- Chad Mayes, 2016-2017
- Brian Dahle, 2017-2018
- Marie Waldron, 2018–2022
- James Gallagher, 2022-2025
- Heath Flora, 2025-2026
- Alexandra Macedo, 2026-present

=== Republican Floor Leaders ===
Since 1996, the Republican Floor Leaders have also served as the Minority Floor Leader. the following have served as the Republican Floor Leader:

- Joseph C. Shell 1962
- Charles J. Conrad 1963–1964
- Robert G. Beverly 1973–1974
- Mike Villines until 2009
- Sam Blakeslee 2009–2010
- Connie Conway 2010–2014
- Heath Flora 2023–2025
- Josh Hoover 2026–present

=== Republican Caucus Chairs ===
- Gene Chappie 1976
- Dick Mountjoy 1982–1984
- Robert Frazee 1990
- Lynne Leach 1997–1998
- Jim Battin 1999
- Charlene Zettel 1999–2000
- Tony Strickland 2001
- Russ Bogh 2005
- Cameron Smyth 2009
- Connie Conway 2010
- Brian Nestande 2011
- Tom Lackey 2023–2025
- Natasha Johnson 2026–present

=== Republican Whips ===
Since 1996, the Republican Whip has served as the Minority Whip. The following has served as the Republican Whip:

- Nathan Fletcher (2010 (Chief Republican Whip)
- Bill Berryhill 2011 (Chief Minority Whip)
- Dan Logue 2011 (Chief Minority Whip)
- Kristin Olsen 2011
- Juan Alanis 2023–2024 (Chief Republican Whip)
- David Tangipa 2026–present

== See also ==
- California Republican Party
