= William Riker (disambiguation) =

William Riker is a fictional character in the Star Trek universe.

William Riker may also refer to:

- William E. Riker (1873–1969), American religious leader
- William H. Riker (1920–1993), American political scientist

== See also ==
- William (disambiguation)
- Riker (disambiguation)
