= 1942 California gubernatorial election =

- November 3, 1942
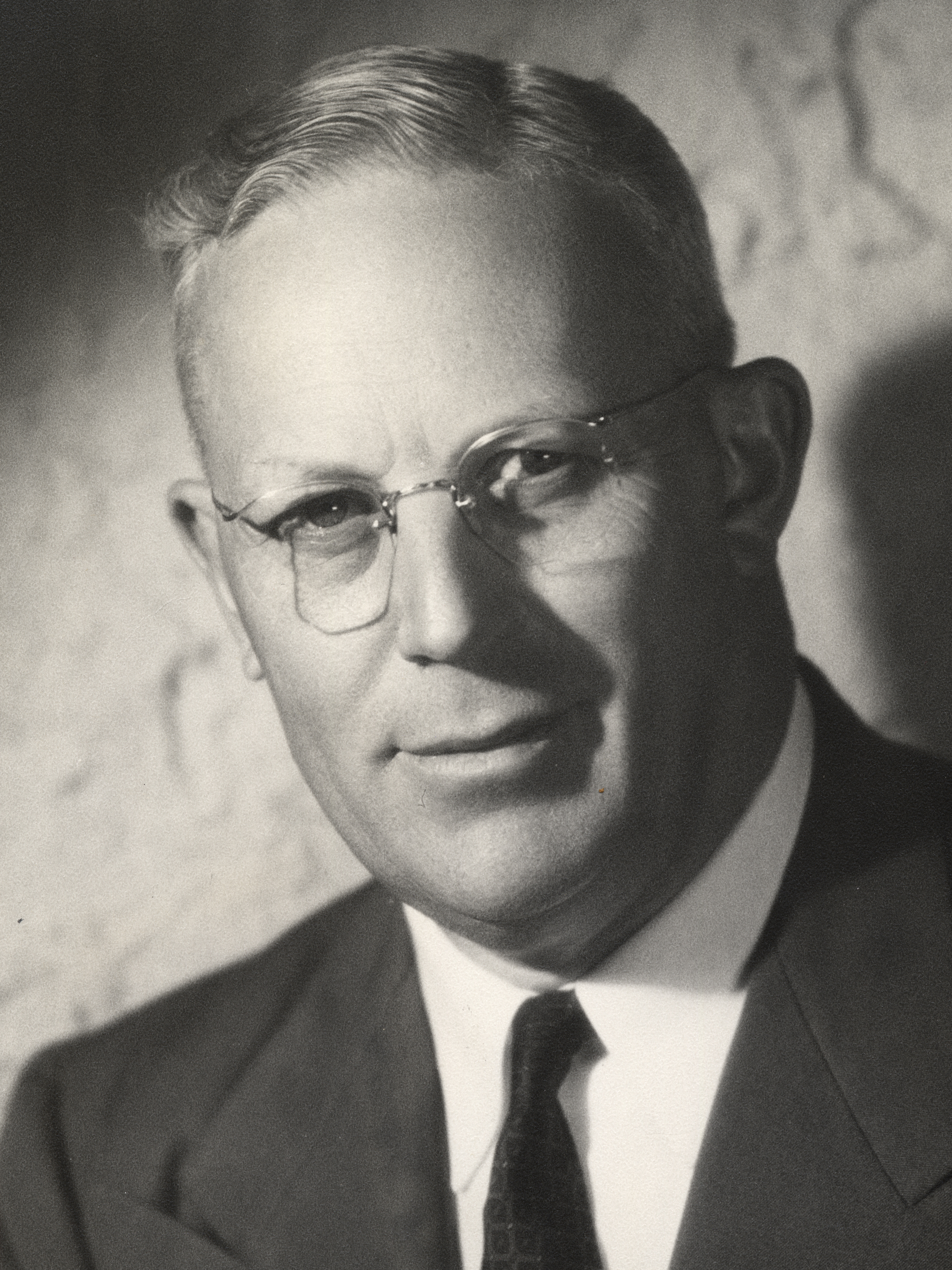

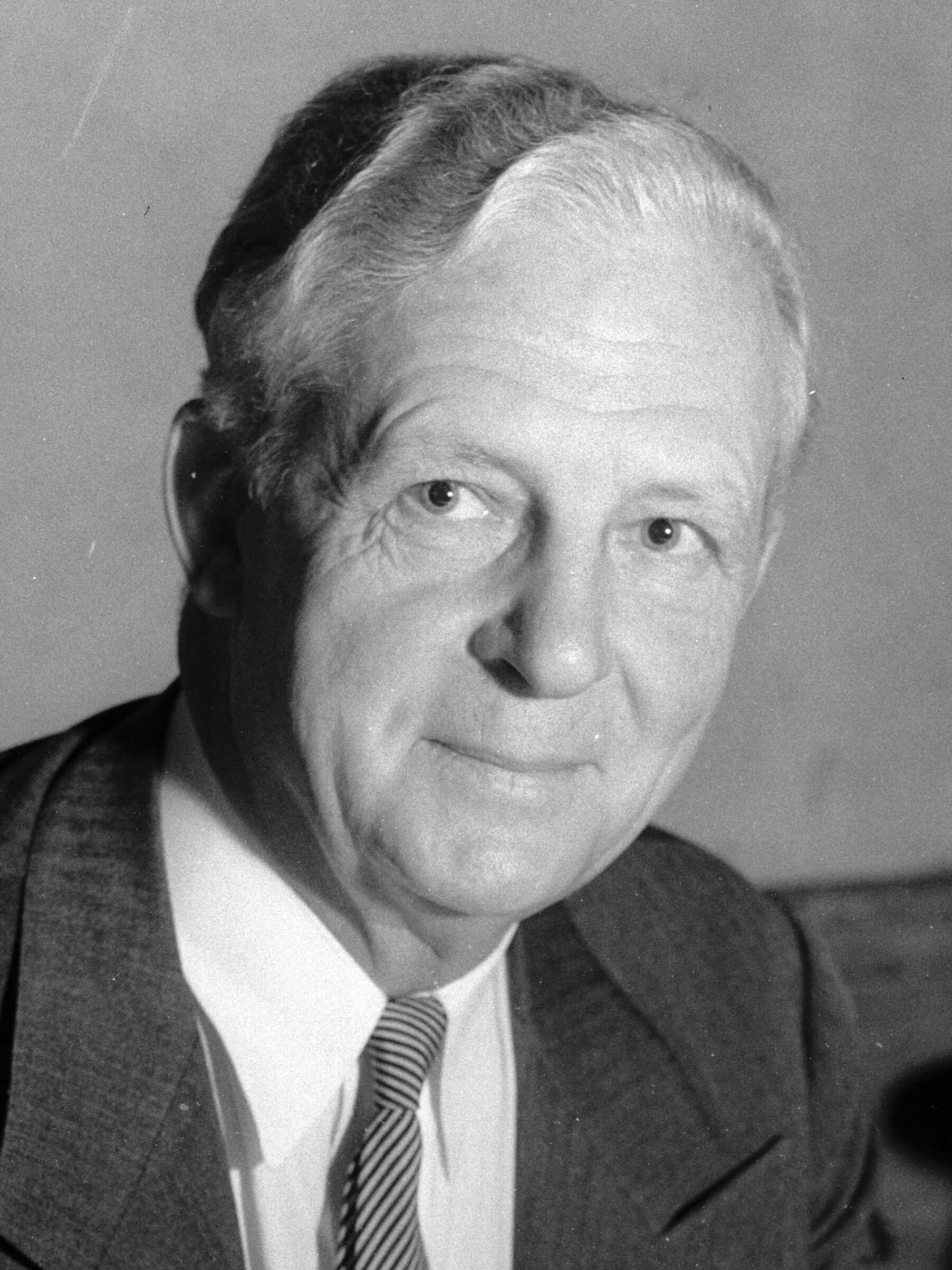
Nominee	Earl Warren	Culbert Olson
Party	Republican	Democratic
Popular vote	1,275,287	932,995
Percentage	57.07%	41.75%
- County results Warren: 50–60% 60–70% 70–80% Olson: 50–60%
Governor before election
Culbert Olson
Democratic
Elected Governor
Earl Warren
Republican

The 1942 California gubernatorial election was held on November 3, 1942. The election pitted incumbent Democratic Governor Culbert Olson against state Attorney General Earl Warren. Warren won in a landslide to become the 30th governor of California, receiving 57% of the vote to Olson's 42%.

== Primary election results ==
=== Candidates ===
- Culbert L. Olson (D), incumbent governor
- Ray G. Owens (D)
- Alonzo J. Riggs (D)
- William E. Riker (R), white supremacist preacher
- Earl Warren (R), Attorney General of California
- Nathan T. Porter (Townsend)
- Fred Dyster (Prohibition)

=== Results ===
Democratic primary results
Party	Candidate	Votes	%
Democratic	Culbert L. Olson (incumbent)	514,144	52.04%
Democratic	Earl Warren	404,778	40.97%
Democratic	Ray G. Owens	50,780	5.14%
Democratic	Nathan T. Porter	11,032	1.12%
Democratic	Alonzo J. Riggs	7,231	0.73%
Total votes		987,965	100.00%

Republican primary results
Party	Candidate	Votes	%
Republican	Earl Warren	635,230	94.22%
Republican	Nathan T. Porter	15,602	2.31%
Republican	William E. Riker	10,004	1.48%
Republican	Fred Dyster	9,824	1.46%
Republican	Culbert L. Olson (write-in)	3,504	0.52%
Total votes		674,164	100.00%

Townsend primary results
Party	Candidate	Votes	%
Townsend	Nathan T. Porter	1,899	65.33%
Townsend	Earl Warren (write-in)	747	25.70%
Townsend	Culbert L. Olson (write-in)	261	8.98%
Total votes		2,907	100.00%

Prohibition primary results
Party	Candidate	Votes	%
Prohibition	Fred Dyster	1,561	100.00%
Total votes		1,561	100.00%

== General election results ==
1942 California gubernatorial election
Party	Candidate	Votes	%	±%
Republican	Earl Warren	1,275,287	57.07%	+12.91%
Democratic	Culbert Olson (incumbent)	932,995	41.75%	−10.74%
Townsend	Nathan T. Porter	15,501	0.69%	+0.69%
Prohibition	Fred Dyster	10,640	0.48%	+0.48%
	Scattering	122	0.01%	
Majority		342,292	15.32%	
Total votes		2,234,545	100.00%	
Republican gain from Democratic		Swing	+23.64%	

=== Results by county ===
County	Earl Warren Republican		Culbert L. Olson Democratic		Nathan T. Porter Townsend		Fred Dyster Prohibition		Scattering Write-in		Margin		Total votes cast
County	#	%	#	%	#	%	#	%	#	%	#	%	Total votes cast
Alameda	110,438	55.23%	87,964	43.99%	963	0.48%	579	0.29%	18	0.01%	22,474	11.24%	199,962
Alpine	92	76.03%	27	22.31%	1	0.83%	1	0.83%	0	0.00%	65	53.72%	121
Amador	1,506	61.37%	926	37.73%	11	0.45%	11	0.45%	0	0.00%	580	23.63%	2,454
Butte	8,345	65.43%	4,198	32.91%	132	1.03%	80	0.63%	0	0.00%	4,147	32.51%	12,755
Calaveras	1,922	73.81%	664	25.50%	13	0.50%	5	0.19%	0	0.00%	1,258	48.31%	2,604
Colusa	2,102	71.59%	805	27.42%	22	0.75%	7	0.24%	0	0.00%	1,297	44.18%	2,936
Contra Costa	21,450	51.88%	19,542	47.27%	173	0.42%	175	0.42%	4	0.01%	1,908	4.61%	41,344
Del Norte	876	59.47%	568	38.56%	23	1.56%	6	0.41%	0	0.00%	308	20.91%	1,473
El Dorado	2,632	60.44%	1,662	38.16%	35	0.80%	26	0.60%	0	0.00%	970	22.27%	4,355
Fresno	23,002	51.39%	21,116	47.18%	384	0.86%	258	0.58%	0	0.00%	1,886	4.21%	44,760
Glenn	2,955	68.42%	1,321	30.59%	25	0.58%	18	0.42%	0	0.00%	1,634	37.83%	4,319
Humboldt	9,053	58.68%	6,242	40.46%	89	0.58%	43	0.28%	0	0.00%	2,811	18.22%	15,427
Imperial	5,490	67.21%	2,567	31.42%	69	0.84%	43	0.53%	0	0.00%	2,923	35.78%	8,169
Inyo	1,861	70.76%	734	27.91%	23	0.87%	12	0.46%	0	0.00%	1,127	42.85%	2,630
Kern	18,083	60.14%	11,707	38.94%	139	0.46%	138	0.46%	1	0.00%	6,376	21.21%	30,068
Kings	4,859	59.47%	3,222	39.43%	46	0.56%	44	0.54%	0	0.00%	1,637	20.03%	8,171
Lake	1,980	72.53%	676	24.76%	56	2.05%	18	0.66%	0	0.00%	1,304	47.77%	2,730
Lassen	2,151	54.26%	1,763	44.48%	43	1.08%	7	0.18%	0	0.00%	388	9.79%	3,964
Los Angeles	506,038	54.12%	417,360	44.64%	6,729	0.72%	4,866	0.52%	54	0.01%	88,678	9.48%	935,047
Madera	3,377	63.09%	1,903	35.55%	43	0.80%	30	0.56%	0	0.00%	1,474	27.54%	5,353
Marin	11,307	66.73%	5,531	32.64%	58	0.34%	48	0.28%	0	0.00%	5,776	34.09%	16,944
Mariposa	1,019	65.07%	521	33.27%	19	1.21%	7	0.45%	0	0.00%	498	31.80%	1,566
Mendocino	5,719	64.37%	3,056	34.40%	54	0.61%	55	0.62%	0	0.00%	2,663	29.98%	8,884
Merced	7,075	61.26%	4,310	37.32%	87	0.75%	76	0.66%	2	0.02%	2,765	23.94%	11,550
Modoc	1,203	60.15%	771	38.55%	19	0.95%	7	0.35%	0	0.00%	432	21.60%	2,000
Mono	393	72.78%	143	26.48%	1	0.19%	3	0.56%	0	0.00%	250	46.30%	540
Monterey	11,278	65.73%	5,738	33.44%	88	0.51%	52	0.30%	2	0.01%	5,540	32.29%	17,158
Napa	5,680 (Note: The published Statement of Vote contains a typo for Warren in this county. The correct figure can be found on the original canvass at the State Archives.)	62.74%	3,240	35.79%	88 (Note: The published Statement of Vote contains a typo for Porter in this county. The correct figure can be found on the original canvass at the State Archives.)	0.97%	45	0.50%	0	0.00%	2,440	26.95%	9,053
Nevada	3,974	67.14%	1,893	31.98%	28	0.47%	24	0.41%	0	0.00%	2,081	35.16%	5,919
Orange	31,065	69.54%	12,847	28.76%	377	0.84%	385	0.86%	1	0.00%	18,218	40.78%	44,675
Placer	4,709	52.60%	4,149	46.35%	57	0.64%	36	0.40%	1	0.01%	560	6.26%	8,952
Plumas	1,348	46.35%	1,537	52.85%	16	0.55%	7	0.24%	0	0.00%	-189	-6.50%	2,908
Riverside	18,547	65.81%	9,000	31.94%	290	1.03%	342	1.21%	2	0.01%	9,547	33.88%	28,181
Sacramento	29,175	51.92%	26,475	47.11%	372	0.66%	173	0.31%	0	0.00%	2,700	4.80%	56,195
San Benito	2,592	74.06%	878	25.09%	11	0.31%	17	0.49%	2	0.06%	1,714	48.97%	3,500
San Bernardino	28,517	64.49%	14,880	33.65%	365	0.83%	453	1.02%	5	0.01%	13,637	30.84%	44,220
San Diego	51,709	58.56%	35,113	39.76%	906	1.03%	579	0.66%	0	0.00%	16,596	18.79%	88,307
San Francisco	120,979	53.40%	103,888	45.85%	1,178	0.52%	514	0.23%	1	0.00%	17,091	7.54%	226,560
San Joaquin	24,511	71.55%	9,380	27.38%	228	0.67%	138	0.40%	0	0.00%	15,131	44.17%	34,257
San Luis Obispo	7,121	64.28%	3,784	34.16%	100	0.90%	73	0.66%	0	0.00%	3,337	30.12%	11,078
San Mateo	26,037	63.43%	14,737	35.90%	175	0.43%	96	0.23%	5	0.01%	11,300	27.53%	41,050
Santa Barbara	14,657	68.71%	6,437	30.18%	152	0.71%	85	0.40%	1	0.00%	8,220	38.53%	21,332
Santa Clara	37,905	64.23%	20,367	34.51%	482	0.82%	244	0.41%	20	0.03%	17.538	29.72%	59,018
Santa Cruz	9,858	66.45%	4,761	32.09%	136	0.92%	80	0.54%	0	0.00%	5,097	34.36%	14,835
Shasta	4,591	56.48%	3,382	41.60%	119	1.46%	37	0.46%	0	0.00%	1,209	14.87%	8,129
Sierra	442	53.77%	376	45.74%	3	0.36%	1	0.12%	0	0.00%	66	8.03%	822
Siskiyou	5,217	61.03%	3,151	36.86%	150	1.75%	30	0.35%	0	0.00%	2,066	24.17%	8,548
Solano	9,453	53.25%	8,131	45.81%	123	0.69%	44	0.25%	0	0.00%	1,322	7.45%	17,751
Sonoma	14,299	60.94%	8,962	38.19%	132	0.56%	70	0.30%	2	0.01%	5,337	22.74%	23,465
Stanislaus	13,286	62.49%	7,624	35.86%	149	0.70%	201	0.95%	1	0.00%	5,662	26.63%	21,261
Sutter	3,552	73.13%	1,258	25.90%	30	0.62%	17	0.35%	0	0.00%	2,294	47.23%	4,857
Tehama	3,339	73.71%	1,133	25.01%	34	0.75%	24	0.53%	0	0.00%	2,206	48.70%	4,530
Trinity	948	58.74%	635	39.34%	26	1.61%	5	0.31%	0	0.00%	313	19.39%	1,614
Tulare	14,797	68.41%	6,498	30.04%	175	0.81%	160	0.74%	0	0.00%	8,299	38.38%	21,630
Tuolumne	2,624	65.13%	1,360	33.76%	33	0.82%	12	0.30%	0	0.00%	1,264	31.37%	4,029
Ventura	10,282	56.36%	7,730	42.37%	147	0.81%	86	0.47%	0	0.00%	2,552	13.99%	18,245
Yolo	4,853	61.93%	2,921	37.28%	35	0.45%	27	0.34%	0	0.00%	1,932	24.66%	7,836
Yuba	3,014	66.92%	1,431	31.77%	39	0.87%	20	0.44%	0	0.00%	1,583	35.15%	4,504
Total	1,275,287	57.07%	932,995	41.75%	15,501	0.69%	10,640	0.48%	122	0.01%	342,292	15.32%	2,234,545

=== Counties that flipped from Democratic to Republican ===
- Alameda
- Amador
- Butte
- Contra Costa
- El Dorado
- Fresno
- Kern
- Kings
- Lassen
- Los Angeles
- Madera
- Mariposa
- Merced
- Modoc
- Placer
- Sacramento
- San Bernardino
- San Diego
- San Francisco
- San Joaquin
- Shasta
- Sierra
- Siskiyou
- Solano
- Stanislaus
- Trinity
- Tulare
- Tuolumne
- Ventura
- Yuba
