= 1946 California gubernatorial election =

- November 5, 1946
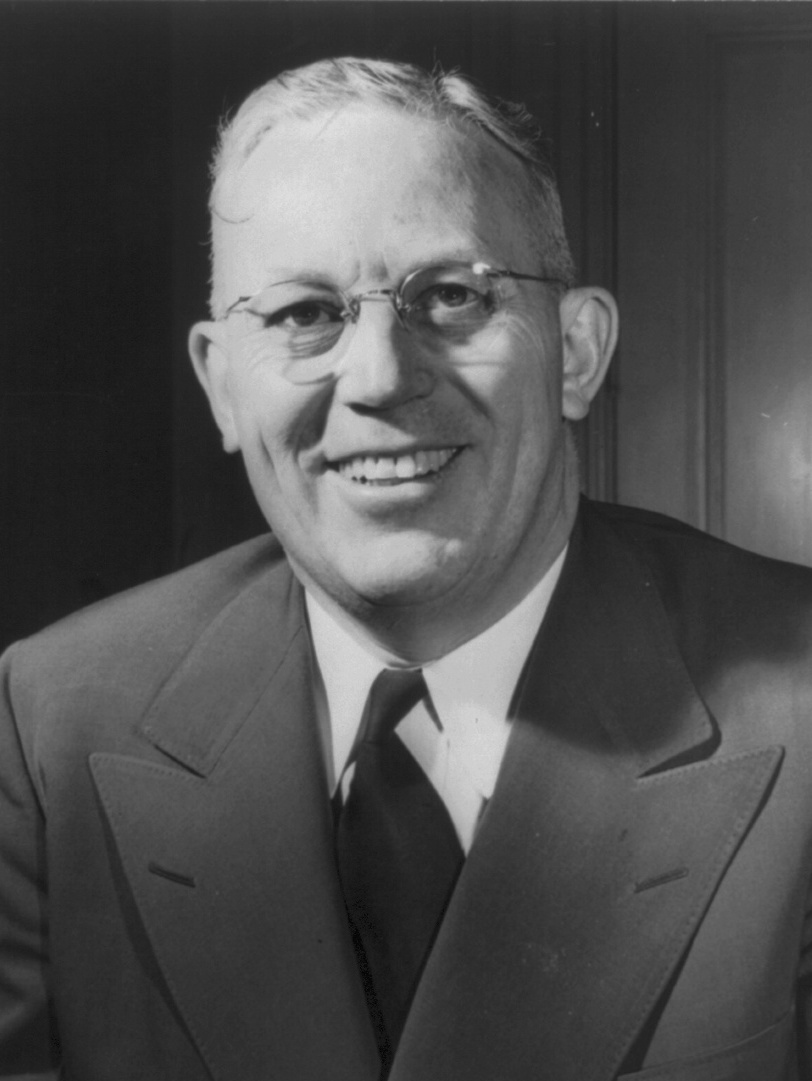

Nominee	Earl Warren	Henry R. Schmidt
Party	Republican	Prohibition
Alliance	Democratic
Popular vote	2,344,542	180,579
Percentage	91.64%	7.06%
- County results Warren: 80–90% 90–100%
Governor before election
Earl Warren
Republican
Elected Governor
Earl Warren
Republican

The 1946 California gubernatorial election was held on November 5, 1946. It is notable for the incumbent Governor, Earl Warren, being nominated by both the Republican and Democratic parties. Subsequently, Warren won re-election effectively unopposed, receiving more than 90% of the vote. He was the first governor of the state to win two elections since Hiram Johnson in 1914.

== Primary election results ==
=== Republican primary ===
The Republican primary occurred on June 5, 1946. Incumbent Governor Earl Warren won 91.10% of the vote.

Republican primary results
Party	Candidate	Votes	%
Republican	Earl Warren (incumbent)	774,502	91.10%
Republican	Robert W. Kenny	70,331	8.27%
Republican	William E. Riker	5,359	0.63%
Total votes		850,192	100.00%

=== Democratic primary ===
The Democratic primary occurred on June 5, 1946. Despite being a Republican, Earl Warren won 51.93% of the vote and the Democratic nomination.

Democratic primary results
Party	Candidate	Votes	%
Democratic	Earl Warren	593,180	51.93%
Democratic	Robert W. Kenny	530,968	46.49%
Democratic	A. Beldon Gilbert	9,865	0.86%
Democratic	William E. Riker	8,175	0.72%
Total votes		1,142,188	100.00%

=== Prohibition primary ===
Prohibition primary results
Party	Candidate	Votes	%
Prohibition	Henry R. Schmidt	1,786	100.00%
Total votes		1,786	100.00%

== General election results ==
1946 California gubernatorial election
Party	Candidate	Votes	%	±%
Republican	Earl Warren (incumbent)	2,344,542	91.64%	+34.57%
Prohibition	Henry R. Schmidt	180,579	7.06%	+6.58%
Independent	Archie Brown (write-in) (Note: Affiliated with Communist Party)	22,606	0.88%	
Independent	James Roosevelt (write-in) (Note: Affiliated with Democratic Party)	3,210	0.13%	
Independent	Robert W. Kenny (write-in)	1,636	0.06%	
Independent	Albert Clark (write-in)	835	0.03%	
Independent	Robert W. Long (write-in)	679	0.02%	
	Scattering	4,312	0.17%	
Majority		2,163,963	84.58%	
Total votes		2,558,399	100.00%	
Republican hold		Swing	+76.20%	

=== Results by county ===
County	Earl Warren Republican		Henry R. Schmidt Prohibition		Archie Brown Communist		All Others (Note: These votes were Scattering unless otherwise noted in each county) Write-in		Margin		Total votes cast
County	#	%	#	%	#	%	#	%	#	%	Total votes cast
Alameda	179,864	88.32%	19,457	9.55%	3,776	1.85%	543 (Note: 247 for Kenny, 102 for Clark)	0.27%	160,407	78.77%	203,640
Alpine	106	98.15%	2	1.85%	0	0.00%	0	0.00%	104	96.30%	108
Amador	2,416	92.39%	190	7.27%	0	0.00%	9	0.34%	2,226	85.12%	2,615
Butte	12,534	94.13%	782	5.87%	0	0.00%	0	0.00%	11,752	88.25%	13,316
Calaveras	2,507	94.78%	135	5.10%	0	0.00%	3	0.11%	2,372	89.68%	2,645
Colusa	2,750	95.52%	129	4.48%	0	0.00%	0	0.00%	2,621	91.04%	2,879
Contra Costa	44,668	89.92%	3,921	7.89%	1,010	2.03%	77	0.16%	40,747	82.03%	49,676
Del Norte	2,138	95.02%	112	4.98%	0	0.00%	0	0.00%	2,026	90.04%	2,250
El Dorado	3,886	92.52%	314	7.48%	0	0.00%	0	0.00%	3,572	85.05%	4,200
Fresno	48,151	92.05%	4,051	7.74%	90	0.17%	20 (Note: 2 for Roosevelt, 13 for Clark)	0.04%	44,100	84.30%	52,312
Glenn	3,293	95.23%	155	4.48%	7	0.20%	3 (Note: 2 for Kenny, 1 for Long)	0.09%	3,138	90.75%	3,458
Humboldt	14,446	95.03%	677	4.45%	0	0.00%	79	0.52%	13,769	90.57%	15,202
Imperial	7,167	93.91%	446	5.84%	0	0.00%	19	0.25%	6,721	88.06%	7,632
Inyo	2,337	94.42%	125	5.05%	0	0.00%	13	0.53%	2,212	89.37%	2,475
Kern	32,497	92.37%	2,608	7.41%	0	0.00%	78	0.22%	29,889	84.95%	35,183
Kings	7,512	93.88%	472	5.90%	0	0.00%	18	0.22%	7,040	87.98%	8,002
Lake	3,016	94.55%	164	5.14%	0	0.00%	10	0.31%	2,852	89.40%	3,190
Lassen	3,565	93.94%	223	5.88%	0	0.00%	7 (Note: 7 for Kenny)	0.18%	3,342	88.06%	3,795
Los Angeles	988,710	90.57%	81,301	7.45%	13,949	1.28%	7,670 (Note: 3,203 for Roosevelt, 1,370 for Kenny, 716 for Clark, 674 for Long)	0.70%	907,409	83.12%	1,091,630
Madera	5,575	92.22%	457	7.56%	0	0.00%	13	0.22%	5,118	84.67%	6,045
Marin	19,912	95.15%	762	3.64%	0	0.00%	252	1.20%	19,150	91.51%	20,926
Mariposa	1,492	94.85%	75	4.77%	6	0.38%	0	0.00%	1,417	90.08%	1,573
Mendocino	7,048	93.92%	373	4.97%	0	0.00%	83	1.11%	6,675	88.95%	7,504
Merced	11,263	94.48%	658	5.52%	0	0.00%	0	0.00%	10.605	88.96%	11,921
Modoc	1,846	94.86%	100	5.14%	0	0.00%	0	0.00%	1,746	89.72%	1,946
Mono	502	94.36%	30	5.64%	0	0.00%	0	0.00%	472	88.72%	532
Monterey	20,674	95.67%	834	3.86%	0	0.00%	101	0.47%	19,840	91.81%	21,609
Napa	10,786	95.30%	522	4.61%	0	0.00%	10	0.09%	10,264	90.69%	11,318
Nevada	6,483	93.75%	432	6.25%	0	0.00%	0	0.00%	6,051	87.51%	6,915
Orange	51,058	93.13%	3,616	6.60%	0	0.00%	151	0.28%	47,442	86.53%	54,825
Placer	9,209	92.33%	765	7.67%	0	0.00%	0	0.00%	8,444	84.66%	9,974
Plumas	3,652	93.28%	260	6.64%	0	0.00%	3 (Note: 3 for Kenny)	0.08%	3,392	86.64%	3,915
Riverside	33,193	92.44%	2,552	7.11%	0	0.00%	162	0.45%	30,641	85.33%	35,907
Sacramento	54,145	91.64%	4,464	7.56%	385	0.65%	89	0.15%	49,681	84.09%	59,083
San Benito	3,807	96.80%	126	3.20%	0	0.00%	0	0.00%	3,681	93.59%	3,933
San Bernardino	55,874	92.07%	4,500	7.41%	227	0.37%	88	0.15%	51,374	84.65%	60,689
San Diego	115,666	93.48%	8,074	6.52%	0	0.00%	0	0.00%	107,592	86.95%	123,740
San Francisco	220,344	92.15%	16,716	6.99%	2,056	0.86%	0	0.00%	203,628	85.16%	239,116
San Joaquin	37,291	93.90%	2,290	5.77%	103	0.26%	30	0.08%	35,001	88.13%	39,714
San Luis Obispo	12,277	94.16%	698	5.35%	0	0.00%	64	0.49%	11,579	88.80%	13,039
San Mateo	47,672	94.80%	2,183	4.34%	331	0.66%	99	0.20%	45,489	90.46%	50,285
Santa Barbara	22,306	95.11%	1,020	4.35%	0	0.00%	128	0.55%	21,286	90.76%	23,454
Santa Clara	62,641	94.28%	3,393	5.11%	410	0.62%	0	0.00%	59,248	89.17%	66,444
Santa Cruz	17,224	94.22%	965	5.28%	0	0.00%	92	0.50%	16,259	88.94%	18,281
Shasta	7,862	94.45%	447	5.37%	15	0.18%	0	0.00%	7,415	89.08%	8,324
Sierra	836	95.65%	37	4.23%	0	0.00%	1	0.11%	799	91.42%	874
Siskiyou	7,504	94.31%	453	5.69%	0	0.00%	0	0.00%	7,051	88.61%	7,957
Solano	21,609	94.93%	1,155	5.07%	0	0.00%	0	0.00%	20,454	89.85%	22,764
Sonoma	22,692	94.15%	1,219	5.06%	172	0.71%	20	0.08%	21,473	89.09%	24,103
Stanislaus	21,608	92.67%	1,628	6.98%	57	0.24%	24 (Note: 5 for Roosevelt, 7 for Kenny, 4 for Clark, 4 for Long)	0.10%	19,980	85.69%	23,317
Sutter	4,486	94.66%	253	5.34%	0	0.00%	0	0.00%	4,233	89.32%	4,739
Tehama	3,836	92.66%	304	7.34%	0	0.00%	0	0.00%	3,532	85.31%	4,140
Trinity	1,799	93.80%	109	5.68%	0	0.00%	10	0.52%	1,690	88.11%	1,918
Tulare	23,361	93.50%	1,587	6.35%	0	0.00%	36	0.14%	21,774	87.15%	24,984
Tuolumne	4,301	95.24%	203	4.50%	12	0.27%	0	0.00%	4,098	90.74%	4,516
Ventura	19,012	90.74%	1,340	6.40%	0	0.00%	601	2.87%	17,672	84.34%	20,953
Yolo	7,719	94.28%	420	5.13%	0	0.00%	48	0.59%	7,299	89.15%	8,187
Yuba	4,414	93.38%	295	6.24%	0	0.00%	18	0.38%	4,119	87.14%	4,727
Total	2,344,542	91.64%	180,579	7.06%	22,606	0.88%	10,672	0.42%	2,163,963	84.58%	2,558,399

=== Counties that flipped from Democratic to Republican ===
- Plumas
