= List of minority leaders of the California State Assembly =

Minority Leader of the California State Assembly

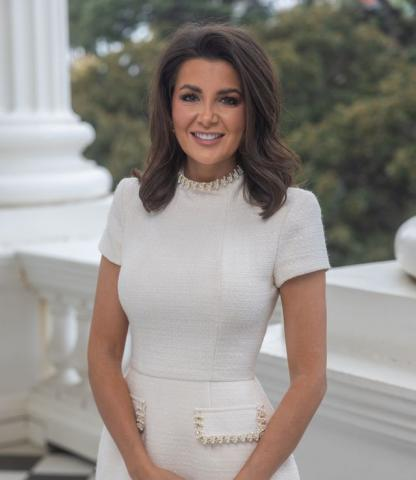
- Incumbent; Alexandra Macedo (R) since August 3, 2026
- Appointer: Minority party in the Assembly
- Term length: 2 years
- Inaugural holder: Charles W. Lyon (R)
- Formation: 1939
- Website: https://www.assembly.ca.gov/assemblymembers/leadership

The Minority Leader of the California State Assembly is the leader of the minority party in the California State Assembly. The current minority leader is Alexandra Macedo of the 33rd district.

== List ==
Name	Took office	Left office	Party/caucus
Charles W. Lyon	1939	1943	Republican
Alfred W. Robertson	1943	1945	Democratic
John B. Cooke	1947	1948	Democratic
Julian Beck	1948 (Note: also stated as starting in 1949)	1952	Democratic
Vincent Thomas	1953	1957 (Note: also stated as ending in 1955)	Democratic
William A. Munnell	1957	1958	Democratic
Joseph C. Shell	1959	1963	Republican
Charles J. Conrad	1963	1964	Republican
Robert T. Monagan	1965	1968	Republican
Jesse M. Unruh	1969	1970 (June)	Democratic
John J. Miller	1970 (June)	1970 (December)	Democratic
Robert T. Monagan	1971	1973	Republican
Robert G. Beverly	1973	1975	Republican
Paul V. Priolo	1976	1979	Republican
Carol Boyd Hallett	1979	1981	Republican
Robert W. Naylor	1981	1984	Republican
Pat Nolan	1984	1988	Republican
Ross Johnson	1988	1991	Republican
Bill Jones	1991	1992	Republican
Jim Brulte	1992	1995	Republican
Willie Brown	1995 (June)	1995 (September)	Democratic
Richard Katz	1995	1996	Democratic
Curt Pringle	1995	1997	Republican
Bill Leonard	1997	1998	Republican
Rod Pacheco	1998	1999	Republican
Scott Baugh	1999	2000	Republican
Bill Campbell	2000	2001	Republican
Dave Cox	2001	2004	Republican
Kevin McCarthy	2004	2006	Republican
George Plescia	2006 (April)	2006 (November)	Republican
Michael Villines	2006	2009	Republican
Sam Blakeslee	2009	2010	Republican
Martin Garrick	2010 (February)	2010 (November)	Republican
Connie Conway	2010	2014	Republican
Kristin Olsen	2014	2016	Republican
Chad Mayes	2016	2017	Republican
Brian Dahle	2017	2018	Republican
Marie Waldron	2018	2022	Republican
James Gallagher	2022	2025	Republican
Heath Flora	2025	2026	Republican
Alexandra Macedo	2026	Incumbent	Republican

== See also ==
- Speaker of the California State Assembly
- List of majority leaders of the California State Assembly
- Minority leader
- Parliamentary leader
