= San Joaquin College of Law =

Private law school in Clovis, California, US

- Motto: Lex Justitia (Law Justice)
- Established: 1969
- School type: Private law school
- Dean: Janice L. Pearson
- Location: Clovis, California, United States
- Enrollment: 204
- Faculty: 10 full-time; 41 adjunct
- USNWR ranking: Unranked
- Bar pass rate: 74% (July 2024 first-time takers)
- Website: San Joaquin College of Law

The San Joaquin College of Law (SJCL) is a private law school in Clovis, California.

== History ==
SJCL was founded in Fresno in 1969 by Fresno County Municipal Court Judge Dan Eymann, U.S. District Court Judge Oliver Wanger, and attorney John Loomis. The school began instruction in 1970 on the campus of Fresno Pacific College (now Fresno Pacific University). It remained there until 1980, when the campus moved to Shields Avenue.

In 1996, SJCL relocated to the original Clovis High School building. The structure was built in 1920. The renovation, including a new courtroom, lecture hall, and enlarged library, allowed the Law School to expand, while still maintaining the historic character of the building.

== Accreditation ==
SJCL is approved by the Committee of Bar Examiners of the State Bar of California. It is not accredited by the American Bar Association. As a result, SJCL graduates may not qualify to take the bar or practice outside of California.

== Bar pass rate ==
For the July, 2025 California bar exam, the school's pass rate for first-time takers was 62% vs. the statewide average of 70%. Among the twenty-three California law schools with thirty or more first-time takers, SJCL ranked eighteenth.

In order to evaluate the "qualitative soundness of a law school's program of legal education," the State Bar of California requires all California-Approved Law schools to provide cumulative bar passage rates for the previous five years. For 2018–2022, SJCL's cumulative five-year bar pass rate was 76.3%.

The school also publishes cumulative graduate bar passage data. According to SJCL, its five-year cumulative bar passage rate was 85.0% in 2025, following reported rates of 78.2% (2024), 79.7% (2023), 76.3% (2022), and 77.7% (2021).

== San Joaquin Agricultural Law Review ==
The San Joaquin Agricultural Law Review has been published by SJCL students since 1990, making it the oldest of the three law reviews in the United States focusing on agriculture law.

== New American Legal Clinic ==
The New American Legal Clinic (NALC) is a non-profit immigration law clinic that operates out of San Joaquin College of Law. There is both a classroom and practical component to the clinical course which is offered every fall, spring and summer session. There is a director and legal director as well as clinical staff that instruct and assist the students in completing and filing cases with the Department of Homeland Security/USCIS as well as the immigration courts. Cases are handled by students and supervised by professors. The NALC Clinic is also recognized as a source of information for media, practitioners, immigrants’ rights groups and collaboratives and agricultural and other industry employers in the Central San Joaquin Valley of California.

== Family Law Mediation Clinic ==
Students and faculty of San Joaquin College of Law provide alternative dispute resolution services in a free family law mediation clinic. They meet with husband and wife in the mediation setting to help them negotiate a legal agreement while avoiding the time and expense of going to court. In their role as mediators, they do not represent either party, nor do they represent the parties jointly.

== Notable alumni ==
- Joe Cooper, NFL player
- Gary S. Austin, Magistrate Judge of the U.S. District Court for the Eastern District of California
- Alexandra Macedo, politician
