= Alexandra Macedo =

American attorney and politician

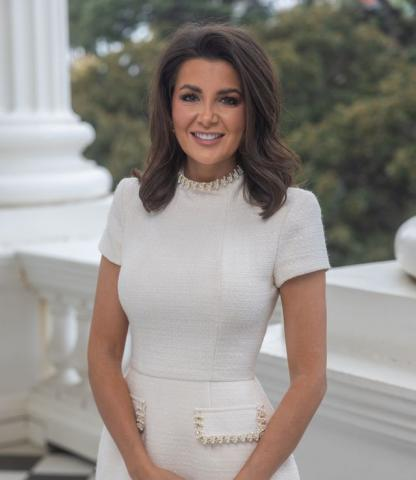
- Official portrait, 2024

Minority Leader of the California Assembly
- Incumbent
- Assumed office August 3, 2026
- Preceded by: Heath Flora

Member of the California State Assembly from the 33rd district
- Incumbent
- Assumed office December 2, 2024
- Preceded by: Devon Mathis

Personal details
- Born: 1994 (age 31–32) Tulare, California, U.S.
- Party: Republican
- Education: California State University, Northridge (BS); San Joaquin College of Law (JD)

Alexandra Marie Macedo (born 1994) is an American politician who is a member of the California State Assembly for the 33rd district, a largely rural district based in the San Joaquin Valley. She has served as Assembly Republican Leader since August 3, 2026.

== Early life and education ==
Macedo was born and raised in Tulare, California to an agricultural family of Portuguese descent that grew almonds and has run the Tulare Sales Yard since 1939. She started participating in 4-H and the National FFA Organization in the 4th grade. At 8 years old, Macedo was diagnosed with supraventricular tachycardia. Her father, David 'Dave' Macedo, previously served as mayor of Tulare.

After graduating from Tulare Union High School, Macedo graduated from California State University, Northridge with a Bachelor of Science in business law and later earned a Juris Doctor from the San Joaquin College of Law. She is not admitted to the State Bar of California.

== Career ==
She founded Macedo Engineering & Consulting Inc. with her mother, an agricultural company focused on supporting dairy and crop farmers. She is currently President of Macedo Environmental Consulting Inc., offering environmental compliance assistance and consulting along with agricultural design and project management.

In 2018, Macedo won the Miss Central Valley beauty pageant.

== California State Assembly ==
Incumbent Devon Mathis announced he would not seek re-election to the California State Assembly in 2024 and endorsed Macedo for the seat the next day.

As a state legislator, Macedo has publicly opposed major spending on California’s High-Speed Rail project, calling Governor Gavin Newsom’s announcement of its southern railhead completion “an absolute disgrace and disrespectful to the Central Valley.”

She has also expressed concerns about proposed state redistricting maps and suggested potential legal challenges, contending that current proposals could disenfranchise voters.

In 2025, Macedo was named “Almond Champion of the Year” by the Almond Alliance in recognition of her leadership on agricultural issues, such as water infrastructure, wildfire prevention, and cost reduction for workers and farmers.

Macedo was elected Minority Leader of the California State Assembly on August 3, 2026, succeeding Heath Flora, after members of the Assembly Republican Caucus voted to replace Flora. Macedo, a Republican representing the 33rd Assembly District, became the leader of the Assembly Republican Caucus and subsequently appointed Josh Hoover as Minority Floor Leader.

== Electoral history ==
2024 California State Assembly 33rd district election
Primary election
| Party | Candidate | Votes | % |
|---|---|---|---|
| Republican | Alexandra Macedo | 22,165 | 44.1 |
| Republican | Xavier Avila | 11,845 | 23.5 |
| Democratic | Ruben Macareno | 7,640 | 15.2 |
| Democratic | Angel Ruiz | 6,292 | 12.5 |
| Democratic | Hipolito Cerros | 2,375 | 4.7 |
| Total votes | | 50,317 | 100.0 |
General election
| Republican | Alexandra Macedo | 72,575 | 62.9 |
| Republican | Xavier Avila | 42,773 | 37.1 |
| Total votes | | 115,348 | 100.0 |
| Republican hold | | | |

August 2026 California State Assembly Republican Caucus leadership election
Primary election
| Party | Candidate | Votes | % |
|---|---|---|---|
| Republican | Alexandra Macedo | 10 | 52.6 |
| Republican | Heath Flora | 9 | 47.4 |
| Total votes | | 19 | 100.0 |
| Republican hold | | | |

California Assembly
| Preceded by Heath Flora | Minority Leader of the California Assembly; 2026–present | Incumbent |
