= Corrin Rankin =

American politician (born 1974)

Chair of the California Republican Party
- Incumbent
- Assumed office March 16, 2025
- Preceded by: Jessica Millan Patterson

Personal details
- Born: Corrin Rankin Pellarin; March 19, 1974 (age 52) Redwood City, California, U.S.
- Party: Republican
- Education: Masters Institute (BS)

Corrin Rankin Pellarin (born March 19, 1974) is an American politician who is the chairwoman of the California Republican Party. She defeated former California State Senator Mike Morrell with 57% of the vote in March 2025, becoming the first black person to serve as chairwoman in state party history.

== Early life and education ==
Corrin Rankin was born and raised in Redwood City, California, on March 19, 1974. For a brief period, Rankin lived in Menlo Park, California, and attended a Catholic school at St. Raymond. She received her college diploma from the Masters Institute of Technology in San Jose.

Party political offices
Preceded by Jessica Millan Patterson	Chair of the California Republican Party; 2025–present	Incumbent
