= Riker =

Riker or Ryker is a given name and surname of Dutch origin and is a cognate of Richard.

== Persons with the surname ==
- Albert Joyce Riker (1894-1982), American plant pathologist
- Andrew L. Riker (1868–1930), American automobile designer and engineer
- Brock Riker (born 2006), American football player
- David Riker, American screenwriter and film director
- James Riker (1822-1889), New York historian and genealogist
- John Riker (died 2019), American truck driver and manager in WCW under the name Ralphus
- John Lafayette Riker (1822–1862), American Civil War Officer
- Philip Riker (born 1946), American former competition swimmer
- Richard Riker (1773–1842), New York politician
- Robin Riker (born 1952), American actress and book author
- Samuel Riker (1743-1823), New York politician
- Tom Riker (born 1950), American former professional basketball player
- William E. Riker (1873–1969), cult leader
- William H. Riker (1920–1993), American political scientist

=== In fiction ===
- William T. Riker, a fictional character in the Star Trek franchise
  - Kyle Riker, father of the fictional William Riker
  - Thomas Riker, a fictional twin of William Riker in Star Trek franchise
- John Ryker, fictional enemy of the Hulk in Marvel comics

== Persons with the given name ==
- Ryker Evans (born 2001), Canadian ice hockey player
- Riker Hylton (born 1988), Jamaican sprinter
- Ryker Lee (born 2006), American ice hockey player
- Riker Lynch (born 1991), American singer
- Ryker Mathews (born 1992), American football player

== Other ==
- Riker (TV series), an American television series
- Rikers Island, in New York
- Can-Am Ryker, a three-wheeled motorcycle
- Riker Electric Vehicle Company, a defunct American motor vehicle manufacturer founded in 1898
- Vortex Rikers, a fictional prison spacecraft in the Unreal franchise
