= Kristin Olsen =

American politician (born 1974)

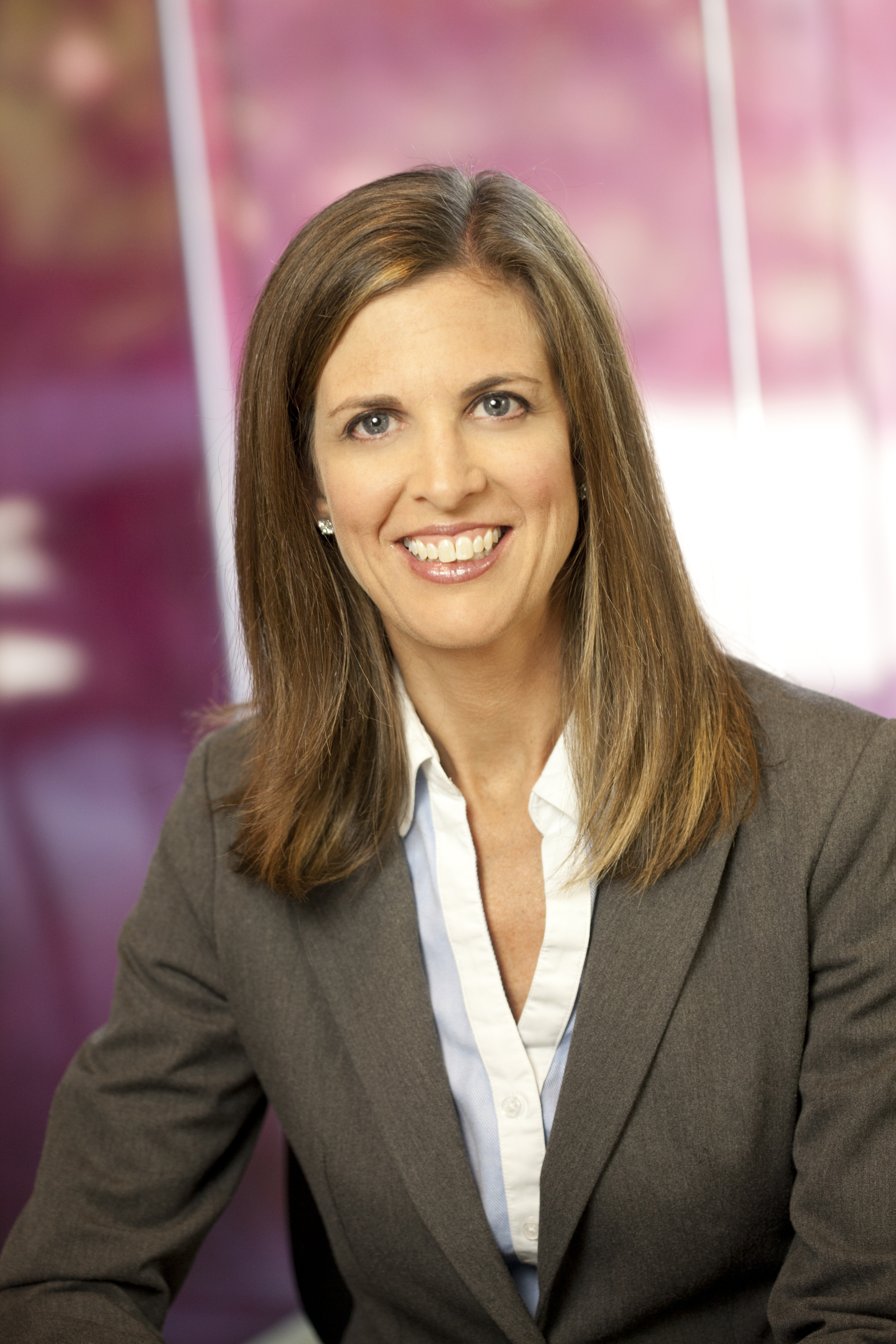

Member of the Stanislaus County Board of Supervisors
- In office January 10, 2017 – January 10, 2021
- Preceded by: Bill O’Brien
- Succeeded by: Buck Condit

Minority Leader of the California Assembly
- In office November 6, 2014 – January 4, 2016
- Preceded by: Connie Conway
- Succeeded by: Chad Mayes

Member of the California State Assembly from the 12th district
- In office December 3, 2012 – November 30, 2016
- Preceded by: Fiona Ma
- Succeeded by: Heath Flora

Member of the California State Assembly from the 25th district district
- In office December 6, 2010 – November 30, 2012
- Preceded by: Tom Berryhill
- Succeeded by: Bob Wieckowski

Member of the Modesto City Council from the 5th district
- In office December 21, 2005 – December 6, 2010
- Preceded by: Denny Jackman
- Succeeded by: Stephanie Burnside

Personal details
- Born: January 19, 1974 (age 52) Modesto, California, U.S.
- Party: Republican
- Education: Westmont College
- Occupation: Business Owner politician

Kristin Olsen (born January 19, 1974) is an American business owner and politician. She served on the Stanislaus County Board of Supervisors from 2017 to 2021. From 2010 to 2016 she served in the California State Assembly representing the 12th district and serving as the Assembly Minority Leader. Prior to being elected to the State Assembly, she was a member of the Modesto City Council. Olsen is a Republican and lives in Riverbank.

== Background ==
Olsen was elected to the Modesto City Council in 2005, and re-elected in 2009. While on the City Council, Olsen served as a member of the Safety & Communities Committee and as Vice Chair of the Finance Committee. Prior to this Olsen served as Vice Chair of the Finance Committee and was a member of the Safety & Communities Committee.

In addition to serving on the City Council, Olsen directed marketing and communications programs as Assistant Vice President for Communications & Public Affairs at California State University, Stanislaus. Furthermore, Olsen has served on the Modesto Citizens Housing and Community Development Committee, as well as on the Modesto City Planning Commission.

Olsen served as the vice-chair of the California Republican Party for a brief time in 2017. Olsen resigned from the position citing "personal and professional obligations" that would not allow her to effectively help lead the party.

== Stanislaus County Board of Supervisors ==
As a member of the Stanislaus County Board of Supervisors, Olsen worked on a variety of issues including developing more reliable water infrastructure, improving county health services and alleviating homelessness. As a Supervisor, Olsen was appointed to represent the County on the Commission of the California County Tobacco Securitization Agency, North County Corridor Transportation Express Authority, San Joaquin Valley Air Pollution Control District Board of Directors, and the Stanislaus County Remote Access Network (RAN) Board.

After leaving the State Assembly and joining the Board of Supervisors, Olsen became a board member for California Women Lead, which is a nonpartisan organization that recruits and trains women to run for elected office. She also serves on the supervisory (audit) committee of the Valley First Credit Union and the board of New Way California.

== California State Assembly ==
Olsen was elected to the California State Assembly in 2010. She received the plurality of votes in the June Republican primary election contested by six candidates. In the November 2010 General Election, Olsen received 100% of the vote for the 25th district and easily won reelection for her seat in 2012.

Olsen was praised for being one of eight Republican Assembly Members to release her office operating budget during a controversy between the Speaker of the Assembly John A. Perez and Assemblyman Anthony Portantino. Portantino had alleged that Speaker Perez reduced the operating budget for Portantino's office in retaliation for his "no" vote on the 2011-12 State budget. Portantino went on to release his office spending to the public while Perez and the Assembly Rules committee refused to release the budgets for all of the Assembly despite Public Record requests from newspapers.

Olsen was one of the first Republican members that responded by releasing their office spending in defense of the principle of government transparency. The Sacramento Bee and Modesto Bee praised Olsen for being willing to open her budget to public scrutiny claiming that citizens deserve the right to know how their money is being spent.

Olsen was named a 2014 Aspen Institute Rodel Fellow.

=== Legislation ===
During 2012, Olsen introduced a controversial bill that would ban teachers from having romantic relationships with a student regardless of whether the student was over 18, the age of consent in California. Teachers who violated the ban could face prosecution for a felony and lose their state funded retirement pension. The bill was in response to a Modesto high school teacher who left his wife and children for one of his students following her 18th birthday. While the proposed bill received a substantial amount of media coverage, the bill ultimately failed to get any votes in the Assembly Public Safety committee and was defeated.

Olsen introduced the Legislative Transparency Act during the 2011-2012 Legislative Session which would have required potential legislation to be reviewable online for public viewing at least 72 hours prior to being voted on. Olsen's bill would have stopped the popular practice utilized by Assembly and Senate Democrats where legislation is introduced and passed simultaneously thus nullifying the normal vetting and public review process. This process has been utilized to pass bills with wide-ranging and substantial policy effects in recent years. Assembly Democrats defeated the bill in the Elections Committee hearing on a 2–2 vote with 2 committee members abstaining.

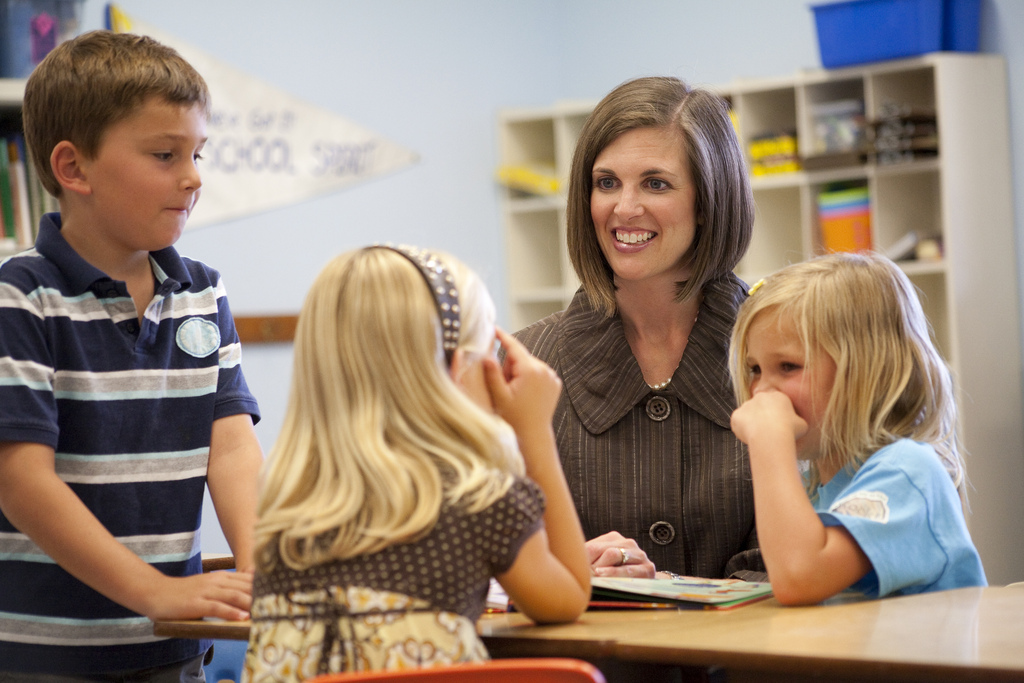
Olsen visiting a school classroom

Olsen was the Vice Chair of both the Education and Agriculture Committees. She was also a member of the Insurance, Higher Education and Accountability and Administrative Review Committees.

=== Elections ===
California's 12th State Assembly district election, 2014
Primary election
Party	Candidate	Votes	%
Republican	Kristin Olsen (incumbent)	38,892	67.5
Democratic	Harinder Grewal	18,742	32.5
Total votes		57,634	100.0
General election
Republican	Kristin Olsen (incumbent)	63,003	67.2
Democratic	Harinder Grewal	30,752	32.8
Total votes		93,755	100.0
Republican hold			
