= 1950 California gubernatorial election =

- November 7, 1950
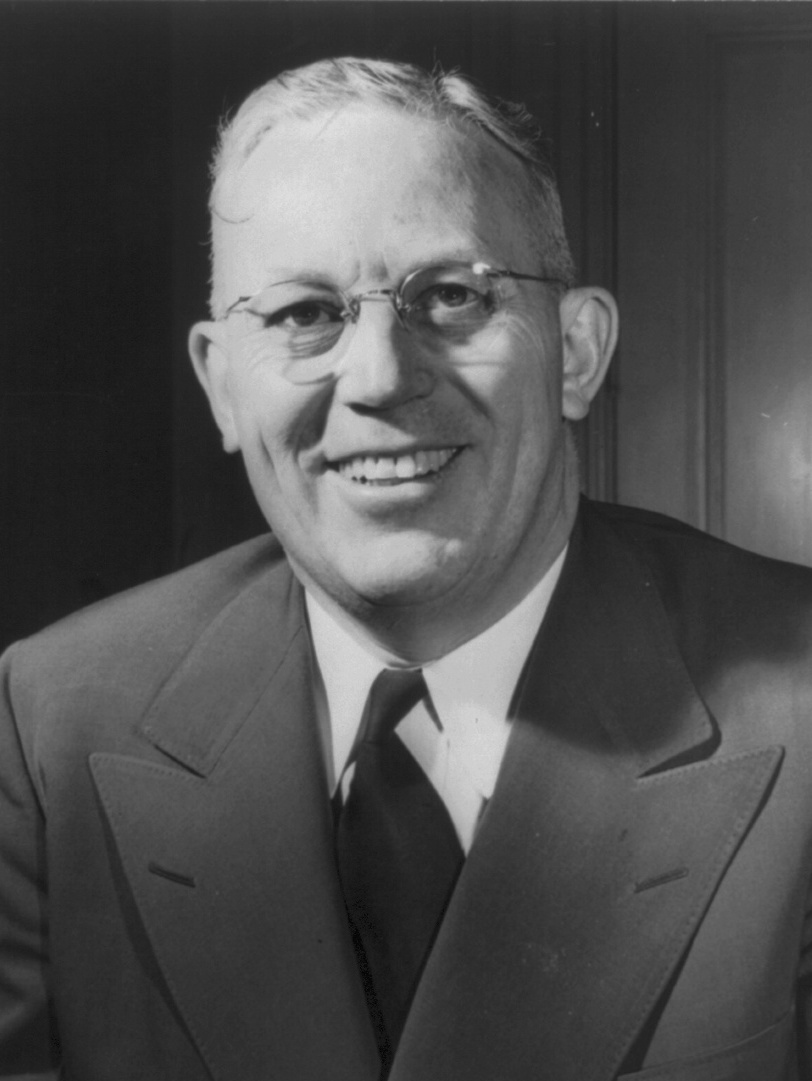

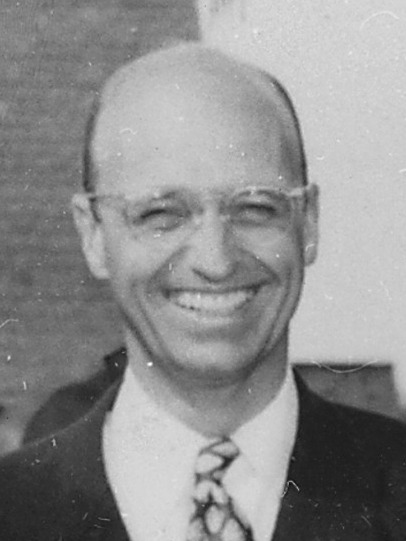
Nominee	Earl Warren	James Roosevelt
Party	Republican	Democratic
Popular vote	2,461,754	1,333,856
Percentage	64.85%	35.14%
- County results Warren: 50–60% 60–70% 70–80% 80–90%
Governor before election
Earl Warren
Republican
Elected Governor
Earl Warren
Republican

The 1950 California gubernatorial election was held on November 7, 1950. For the last time, Warren was reelected governor in a landslide over the Democratic opponent, James Roosevelt, the son of President Franklin D. Roosevelt.

Warren is the last Republican gubernatorial nominee to have won Alameda County, along with being the last nominee of any party to sweep every county in the state.

== Primary elections ==
Primary elections were held on June 6, 1950.

=== Democratic primary ===
==== Candidates ====
- Welburn Mayock, former counsel to the treasurer of the Democratic National Committee
- Olindo R. Angelillo, engineer
- Roy E. Land
- William E. Riker, perennial candidate
- James Roosevelt, Democratic National Committeeman, son of Franklin Roosevelt, insurance broker
- Earl Warren, incumbent Governor

==== Results ====
Democratic primary results
Party	Candidate	Votes	%
Democratic	James Roosevelt	969,433	55.56%
Democratic	Earl Warren (incumbent)	719,468	41.23%
Democratic	Welburn Mayock	27,553	1.58%
Democratic	Olindo R. Angelillo	10,534	0.60%
Democratic	Roy E. Land	10,065	0.58%
Democratic	William E. Riker	7,904	0.45%
Total votes		1,744,957	100.00%

=== Republican primary ===
==== Candidates ====
- Olindo R. Angelillo, engineer
- Roy E. Land
- William E. Riker, perennial candidate
- James Roosevelt, Democratic National Committeeman
- Earl Warren, incumbent Governor

==== Results ====
Republican primary results
Party	Candidate	Votes	%
Republican	Earl Warren (incumbent)	1,101,411	88.40%
Republican	James Roosevelt	120,328	9.66%
Republican	Roy E. Land	9,149	0.73%
Republican	Olindo R. Angelillo	7,966	0.64%
Republican	William E. Riker	7,053	0.57%
Total votes		1,245,907	100.00%

=== Independent–Progressive primary ===
==== Candidates ====
- James Roosevelt, Democratic National Committeeman

==== Results ====
Independent–Progressive primary results
Party	Candidate	Votes	%
Independent-Progressive	James Roosevelt (write-in) (Note: Was not listed as Independent-Progressive in the general election)	3,156	100.00%
Total votes		3,156	100.00%

== General election results ==
1950 California gubernatorial election
Party	Candidate	Votes	%	±%
Republican	Earl Warren (incumbent)	2,461,754	64.85%	−26.79%
Democratic	James Roosevelt	1,333,856	35.14%	+35.01%
	Scattering	480	0.01%	
Majority		1,127,898	29.71%	
Total votes		3,796,090	100.00%	
Republican hold		Swing	-61.80%	

=== Results by county ===
County	Earl Warren Republican		James Roosevelt Democratic		Scattering Write-in		Margin		Total votes cast
County	#	%	#	%	#	%	#	%	Total votes cast
Alameda	177,330	61.52%	110,876	38.47%	31	0.01%	66,454	23.06%	288,237
Alpine	109	80.74%	26	19.26%	0	0.00%	83	61.48%	135
Amador	2,216	56.26%	1,723	43.74%	0	0.00%	493	12.52%	3,939
Butte	14,365	62.07%	8,779	37.93%	0	0.00%	5,586	24.14%	23,144
Calaveras	2,815	59.98%	1,878	40.02%	0	0.00%	937	19.97%	4,693
Colusa	2,825	72.14%	1,091	27.86%	0	0.00%	1,734	44.28%	3,916
Contra Costa	53,486	57.56%	39,430	42.43%	7	0.01%	14,056	15.13%	92,923
Del Norte	2,091	65.16%	1,118	34.84%	0	0.00%	973	30.32%	3,209
El Dorado	4,588	62.64%	2,736	37.36%	0	0.00%	1,852	25.29%	7,324
Fresno	56,987	65.69%	29,764	34.31%	7	0.01%	27,223	31.38%	86,758
Glenn	3,948	71.86%	1,545	28.12%	1	0.02%	2,403	43.74%	5,494
Humboldt	14,946	62.04%	9,143	37.96%	0	0.00%	5,803	24.09%	24,089
Imperial	8,879	69.22%	3,947	30.77%	1	0.01%	4,932	38.45%	12,827
Inyo	2,886	74.55%	985	25.45%	0	0.00%	1,901	49.11%	3,871
Kern	39,250	60.95%	25,143	39.04%	6	0.01%	14,107	21.91%	64,399
Kings	7,694	62.82%	4,552	37.17%	1	0.01%	3,142	25.66%	12,247
Lake	3,708	68.15%	1,730	31.80%	3	0.06%	1,978	36.35%	5,441
Lassen	3,120	56.02%	2,449	43.98%	0	0.00%	671	12.05%	5,569
Los Angeles	1,005,344	63.94%	566,805	36.05%	273	0.02%	438,539	27.89%	1,572,422
Madera	6,102	62.45%	3,669	37.55%	0	0.00%	2,433	24.90%	9,771
Marin	25,347	77.31%	7,435	22.68%	6	0.02%	17,912	54.63%	32,788
Mariposa	1,603	65.91%	829	34.09%	0	0.00%	774	31.83%	2,432
Mendocino	7,824	61.09%	4,983	38.91%	1	0.01%	2,841	22.18%	12,808
Merced	11,476	64.00%	6,454	35.99%	1	0.01%	5,022	28.01%	17,931
Modoc	2,275	65.13%	1,218	34.87%	0	0.00%	1,057	30.26%	3,493
Mono	702	76.89%	211	23.11%	0	0.00%	491	53.78%	913
Monterey	22,858	66.10%	11,721	33.89%	4	0.01%	11,137	32.20%	34,583
Napa	11,429	70.14%	4,866	29.86%	0	0.00%	6,563	40.28%	16,295
Nevada	5,276	65.32%	2,801	34.68%	0	0.00%	2,475	30.64%	8,077
Orange	57,335	75.38%	18,720	24.61%	4	0.01%	38,615	50.77%	76,059
Placer	9,361	58.12%	6,744	41.88%	0	0.00%	2,617	16.25%	16,105
Plumas	2,923	51.51%	2,749	48.44%	3	0.05%	174	3.07%	5,675
Riverside	37,334	66.92%	18,449	33.07%	8	0.01%	18,885	33.85%	55,791
Sacramento	65,748	64.98%	35,441	35.02%	0	0.00%	30,307	29.95%	101,189
San Benito	3,231	71.28%	1,302	28.72%	0	0.00%	1,929	42.55%	4,533
San Bernardino	59,138	63.39%	34,135	36.59%	12	0.01%	25,003	26.80%	93,285
San Diego	128,309	67.20%	62,598	32.79%	26	0.01%	65,711	34.42%	190,933
San Francisco	200,323	65.22%	106,809	34.78%	6	0.00%	93,514	30.45%	307,138
San Joaquin	36,275	60.96%	23,221	39.02%	9	0.02%	13,054	21.94%	59,505
San Luis Obispo	13,043	66.75%	6,496	33.24%	2	0.01%	6,547	33.50%	19,541
San Mateo	68,548	75.79%	21,880	24.19%	16	0.02%	46,668	51.60%	90,444
Santa Barbara	25,519	73.98%	8,976	26.02%	0	0.00%	16,543	47.96%	34,495
Santa Clara	67,548	70.77%	27,876	29.21%	19	0.02%	39,672	41.57%	95,443
Santa Cruz	18,926	68.39%	8,746	31.60%	2	0.01%	10,180	36.79%	27,674
Shasta	7,155	53.24%	6,282	46.75%	1	0.01%	873	6.50%	13,438
Sierra	741	61.14%	470	38.78%	1	0.08%	271	22.36%	1,212
Siskiyou	8,141	63.72%	4,635	36.28%	0	0.00%	3,506	27.44%	12,776
Solano	20,261	59.42%	13,838	40.58%	0	0.00%	6,423	18.84%	34,099
Sonoma	27,896	70.55%	11,629	29.41%	14	0.04%	16,267	41.14%	39,539
Stanislaus	27,121	69.73%	11,773	30.27%	3	0.01%	15,348	39.46%	38,897
Sutter	5,400	68.92%	2,435	31.08%	0	0.00%	2,965	37.84%	7,835
Tehama	4,443	62.24%	2,694	37.74%	1	0.01%	1,749	24.50%	7,138
Trinity	1,434	59.60%	972	40.40%	0	0.00%	462	19.20%	2,406
Tulare	27,050	64.29%	15,018	35.69%	9	0.02%	12,032	28.60%	42,077
Tuolumne	3,660	62.39%	2,206	37.61%	0	0.00%	1,454	24.79%	5,866
Ventura	20,231	61.70%	12,556	38.29%	2	0.01%	7,675	23.41%	32,789
Yolo	8,654	67.83%	4,104	32.17%	0	0.00%	4,660	35.66%	12,758
Yuba	4,527	58.62%	3,195	41.38%	0	0.00%	1,332	17.25%	7,722
Total	2,461,754	64.85%	1,333,856	35.14%	480	0.01%	1,127,898	29.71%	3,796,090

== Bibliography ==
- Brazil, Burton R. (March 1951). "The 1950 Elections in California". The Western Political Quarterly. 4 (1). University of Utah: 67–71. doi:10.2307/442096. JSTOR 442096.
