= Charles J. Conrad =

American politician

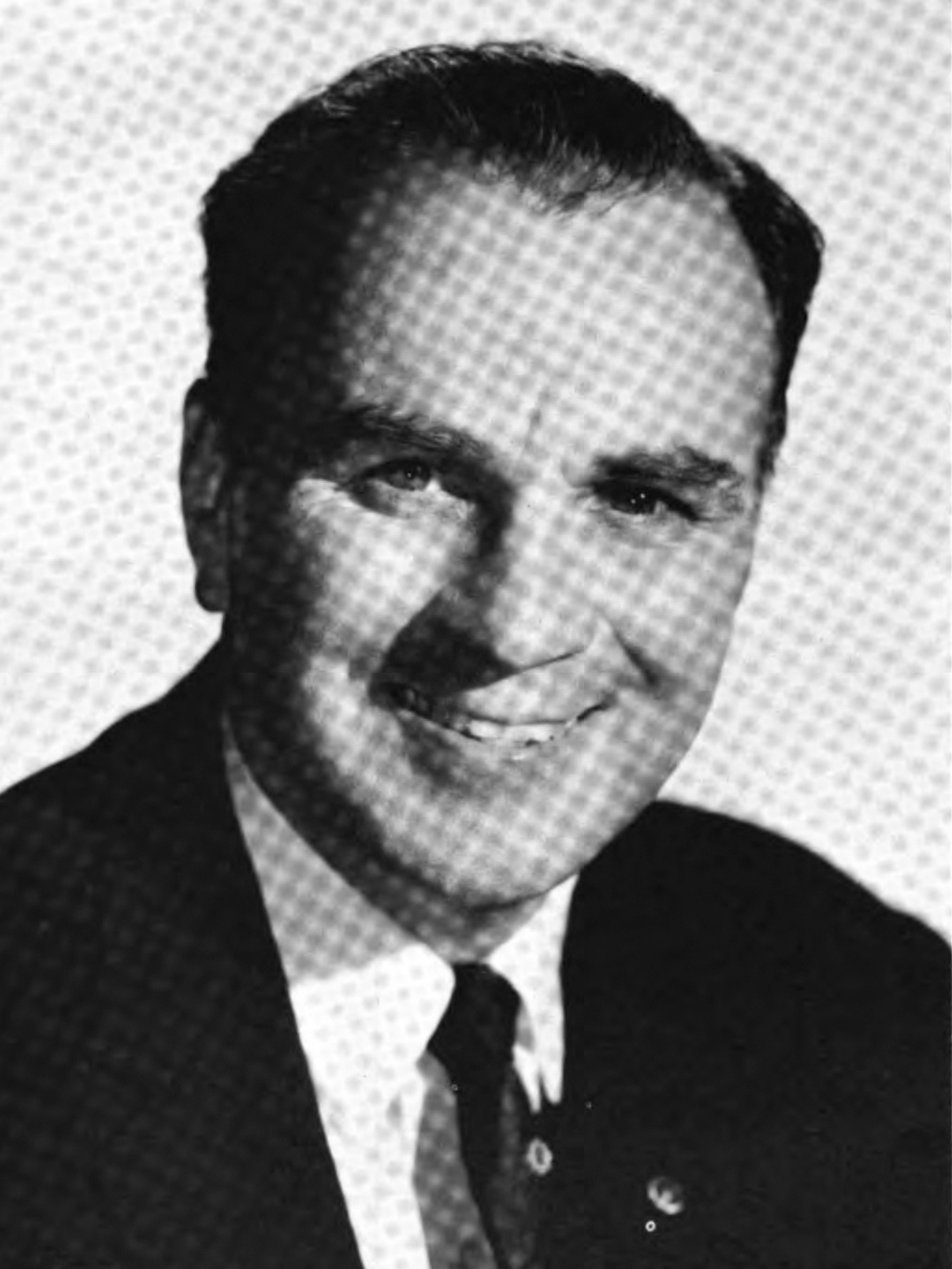

Minority Leader of the California Assembly
- In office 1963–1964
- Preceded by: Joseph C. Shell
- Succeeded by: Robert T. Monagan

Member of the California State Assembly from the 57th district
- In office January 6, 1947 – January 8, 1973
- Preceded by: Albert Dekker
- Succeeded by: Howard Berman

Personal details
- Born: November 28, 1909 Philadelphia, Pennsylvania
- Died: January 15, 1998 (aged 88) Thousand Oaks, California
- Party: Republican
- Spouse: Grace Irene Odell

Military service
- Branch/service: United States Coast Guard
- Battles/wars: World War II

Charles Julius Conrad (November 28, 1909 – January 15, 1998) was an American politician and actor who served in the California State Assembly for the 57th district from 1947 to 1973 and during World War II, he served in the United States Coast Guard. He was defeated in 1972 by Howard Berman. He appeared in the television programs Sergeant Preston of the Yukon and Perry Mason (as a judge).
