= California Republican Party =

California affiliate of the Republican Party

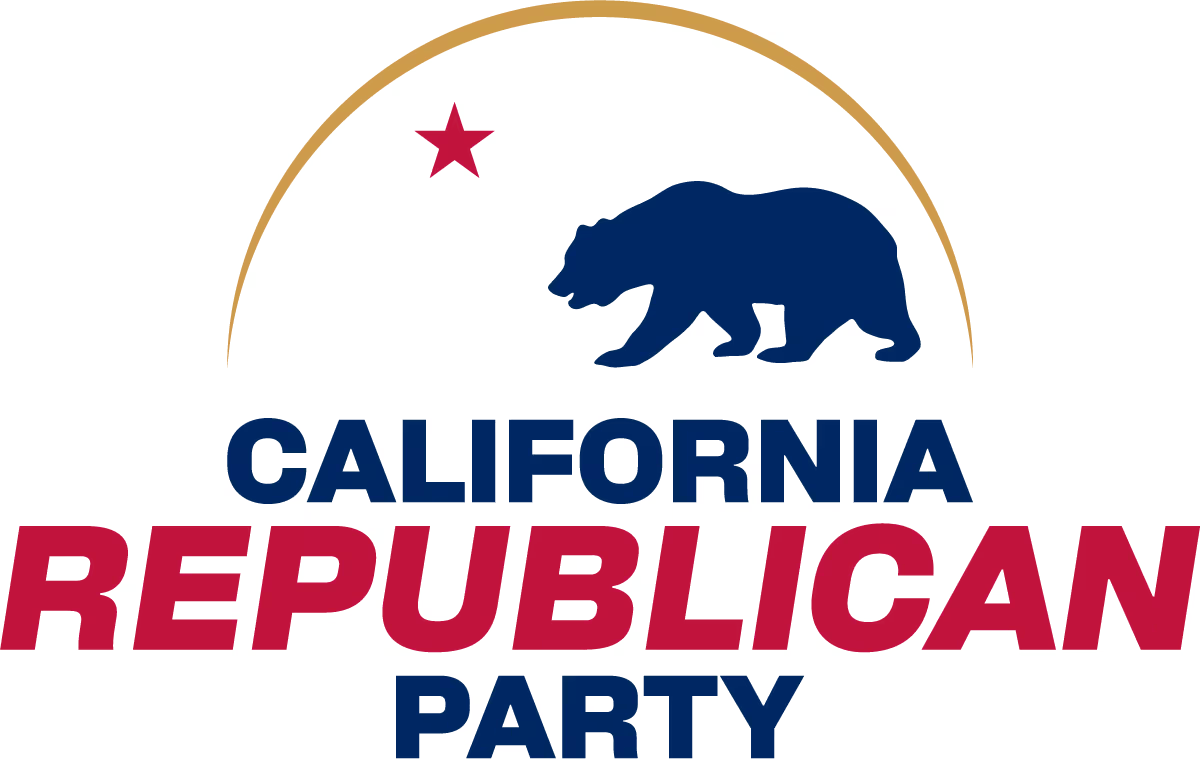
- Chairperson: Corrin Rankin
- Senate Leader: Brian Jones
- Assembly Leader: Alexandra Macedo
- Founders: John C. Frémont; Pío Pico
- Founded: 1854; 172 years ago
- Headquarters: Sacramento, California
- Student wing: California College Republicans
- Membership (October 4, 2026): ▼5,821,120
- Ideology: Conservatism
- National affiliation: Republican Party
- Colors: Red (customary); Green Blue
- United States Senate: 0 / 2
- United States House of Representatives: 8 / 52
- Statewide executive offices: 0 / 8
- California State Senate: 10 / 40
- California State Assembly: 20 / 80

Election symbol

Website
- cagop.org

The California Republican Party (CAGOP) is the affiliate of the United States Republican Party in the U.S. state of California. The party is based in Sacramento, California, and is led by chair Corrin Rankin.

== History ==
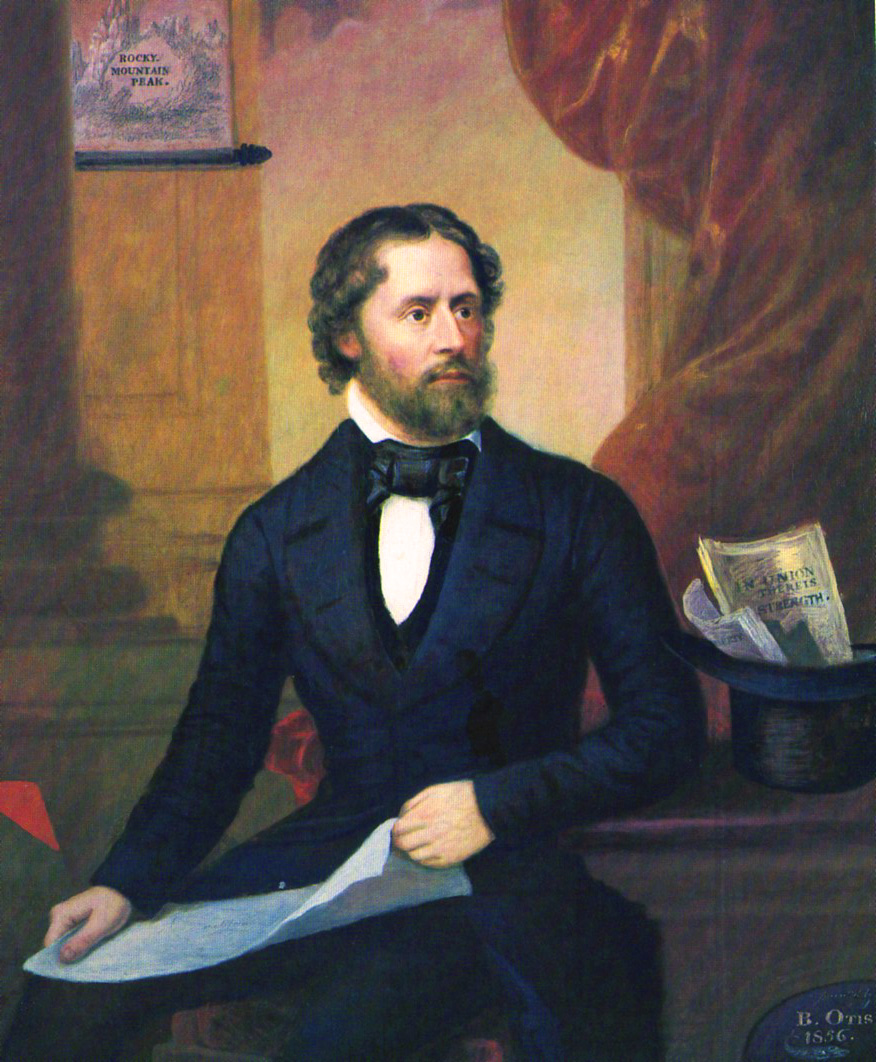
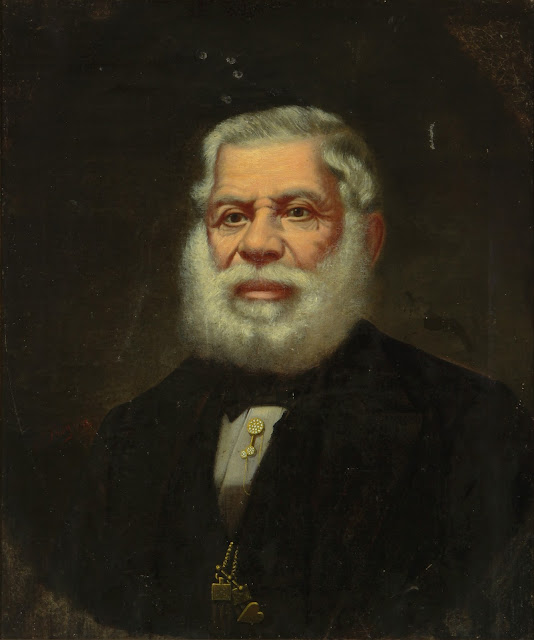
Left to right: former explorer John C. Frémont, and former governor of Alta California and ranchero Pío Pico, who were instrumental in founding the party.

Party logo used in 2024 (Note: Prior to 2024, the party used the same logo, but with the "CA" portion of the logo being green, rather than maroon.)

The Republican Party was born in 1854 as a primary vehicle to oppose the expansion of slavery in the United States. In 1856, Republicans nominated John C. Frémont, one of California's inaugural senators, for the 1856 presidential election, but he lost the state by a wide margin to Democrat and eventual winner James Buchanan, though he did win the state of New York. Later in 1860, Abraham Lincoln was elected to the presidency as the first Republican president. The Republican Party would emerge as primary opposition to the Democratic Party until the present day.

California Republicans and Democrats were competitive throughout the late 19th century. In 1878, Republican California Senator Aaron A. Sargent introduced the language that would become the 19th Amendment to the Constitution, which would allow women the right to vote.

Republicans dominated state politics for most of the 20th century (they controlled the state senate from 1891 to 1958) until the 1960s when the Democrats once again became competitive with the rightward shift of the Republican Party, exemplified by their nomination of Barry Goldwater in 1964 (Goldwater lost California in a landslide). Republicans still saw ample success up until the 1990s. George H. W. Bush carried the state in 1988 after Ronald Reagan twice carried the state in 1984 and 1980. Pete Wilson was elected Senator in 1982 and 1988, and John Seymour was the last Republican Senator from California after being appointed to the seat in 1991.

California's Latino and Asian populations grew significantly in the 1990s. The growing segment of voters were turned off by the Republican Party's hard-line stance on immigration; the Party closely tied itself to Proposition 187. Democrats have won most elections at the state, local, and federal levels since the 2000s by comfortable margins. For example, despite failing to win the presidency, Hillary Clinton won a higher percentage of votes than any candidate since Franklin D. Roosevelt.

Still, California elected Arnold Schwarzenegger twice for governor. Schwarzenegger and Steve Poizner, who later became an independent, are the last Republicans to win statewide elections in California.

California has two Republican presidents in U.S. history: Richard Nixon, who was a U.S. representative and senator from California, and Ronald Reagan, who was a governor of California (1967–1975). Herbert Hoover also studied in California and lived there for a number of years. Other notable California Republicans include former Governor and Chief Justice Earl Warren, former Governor and Senator Hiram Johnson, and former Senator and founder of Stanford University Leland Stanford.

In 2018, the California Republican Party had fewer registered voters than voters registered with a no party preference option; however, that trend reversed in 2020.

The California Republican Party is known for its culture-war style politics; the state party platform advocates for a near-total ban on abortion access, banning same-sex marriage, and privatizing education.

== Elected officials ==
The following is a list of Republican statewide, federal, and legislative officeholders:

=== Members of Congress ===
==== U.S. Senate ====
- None

Both of California's United States Senate seats have been held by Democrats since 1992. John F. Seymour is the last Republican to have represented California in the U.S. Senate. Appointed in 1991 by Pete Wilson who resigned his Class I Senate seat because he was elected governor in 1990, Seymour lost the 1992 special election to Democratic challenger Dianne Feinstein for the remainder of the term expiring in 1995. Feinstein held the seat until her death in 2023. Pete Wilson is the last Republican to have won an election to represent California in the U.S. Senate, when he won in 1988. He is also the last Republican to represent California for a full term in the U.S. Senate from 1983 to 1989.

The last Republican to hold the other senatorial seat (the Class 3 seat) was Thomas Kuchel who held the seat for three terms, from 1953 to 1969. Kuchel ran for a fourth term, but lost the Republican primary.

With the passage of Prop 14 in 2010 setting up a jungle primary system in California, there was a period of 10 years (2012–2022) in which no Republican made the general election for the US Senate, as Republicans were locked out from the general elections in both the 2016 election and the 2018 election.

==== U.S. House of Representatives ====
Out of the 52 seats California is apportioned in the United States House of Representatives, 8 are held by Republicans:

District	Member	Photo
1st	James Gallagher	
5th	Tom McClintock	
20th	Vince Fong	
22nd	David Valadao	
23rd	Jay Obernolte	
40th	Young Kim	
41st → 40th	Ken Calvert	
48th	Darrell Issa	

=== Statewide offices ===
- None

California has not had a Republican in a state-wide elected office since January 2011. Republicans were last elected to a statewide office in 2006, when Arnold Schwarzenegger was re-elected as governor and Steve Poizner was elected as insurance commissioner. In 2010, term limits prevented Schwarzenegger from seeking a third term while Poizner chose not to seek re-election as California's Insurance Commissioner, instead making an unsuccessful bid for the Republican nomination for governor. In 2018, Poizner attempted to run again for his old seat of insurance commissioner, but did so without the affiliation to the Republican Party.

The last Republican to serve as lieutenant governor is Abel Maldonado, who was appointed in 2010 by Schwarzenegger to fill the vacancy when John Garamendi resigned to take a seat in Congress. Maldonado lost the election in 2010 for a full term, and left office in January 2011. The last Republican elected to the position is Mike Curb, who was elected in 1978 and served until January 1983.

The last Republican to serve as Attorney general is Dan Lungren who was elected in 1990, reelected in 1994, and served until January 1999.

The last Republican to serve as Secretary of State is Bruce McPherson, who was appointed to the position in 2005 when the previous Secretary of State, Kevin Shelley, resigned. McPherson lost the election for a full term in 2006 and left office in January 2007. The last Republican elected to the position is Bill Jones who was elected in 1994, reelected in 1998 and served until January 2003.

The last Republican to serve as State treasurer is Matt Fong, who was elected in 1994 and served until January 1999. Fong chose not to run for re-election to a second term in office in 1998, choosing instead to run unsuccessfully for the US Senate seat.

The last Republican to serve as State controller is Houston I. Flournoy, who was elected in 1966, reelected in 1970, and served until January 1975.

The last Republican to serve as the Superintendent of Public Instruction (which is officially a non-partisan position) is Max Rafferty, who was elected in 1962, reelected in 1966, and served until January 1971.

=== Board of Equalization, State Senate and Assembly ===
==== Board of Equalization ====
Republicans hold one of the four non-ex-officio seats on the State Board of Equalization:

- 1st District: Ted Gaines

==== State Senate ====
Republicans are in the minority, holding ten of the 40 seats in the California State Senate. Republicans have been the minority party in the Senate since 1970.

- SD-1: Megan Dahle
- SD-4: Marie Alvarado-Gil (Note: Elected as a Democrat, switched to the Republican Party 20 months into her term)
- SD-8: Roger Niello
- SD-12: Shannon Grove
- SD-19: Rosilicie Ochoa Bogh
- SD-23: Suzette Martinez Valladares
- SD-32: Kelly Seyarto
- SD-36: Tony Strickland
- SD-37: Steven Choi
- SD-40: Brian Jones (Minority Leader)

==== State Assembly ====
Republicans hold 19 of the 80 seats in the California State Assembly. The last time the Republicans were the majority party in the Assembly was during the 1994–1996 session.

- AD-1: Heather Hadwick
- AD-5: Joe Patterson
- AD-7: Josh Hoover
- AD-8: David Tangipa
- AD-9: Heath Flora
- AD-22: Juan Alanis
- AD-32: Stan Ellis
- AD-33: Alexandra Macedo (Minority Leader)
- AD-34: Tom Lackey
- AD-36: Jeff Gonzalez
- AD-47: Greg Wallis
- AD-58: Leticia Castillo
- AD-59: Phillip Chen
- AD-63: Natasha Johnson
- AD-70: Tri Ta
- AD-71: Kate Sanchez
- AD-72: Diane Dixon
- AD-74: Laurie Davies
- AD-75: Carl DeMaio

=== Mayoral offices ===
Of California's ten largest cities, two have Republican mayors as of March 25th 2026:

- Fresno (5): Jerry Dyer
- Bakersfield (9): Karen Goh

== Rules for presidential primary elections ==
=== How delegates are awarded ===
As of the 2024 Republican National Convention, the California Republican Party gets to send 169 delegates to the quadannual Presidential nominating convention, the most of any state party. From the 2004 presidential primary until the 2020 presidential primary, the California Republican Party awarded three delegates to the winner of the primary within each one of the state's congressional districts, with the balance (about a dozen delegates) awarded proportionally based on the statewide result.

Ahead of the 2024 National Convention, the state party changed its rules for awarding delegates in order to comply with the rules of the national party (failure to do so would have resulted in a cut of 50% to the number of delegates the state party gets to send to the national convention). Under the new system, delegates are awarded based on the statewide results, rather than results within the individual districts. At the urging of the Donald Trump presidential campaign, the rules were also changed that if a candidate receives more than 50% of the primary votes, the candidate gets 100% of the state's 169 allotted delegates. If no candidate gets 50% of the primary vote, then delegates are awarded proportionally.

=== Participation of "independent" voters ===
Since January 2001, California has had a "modified" closed primary system in which political parties can determine whether or not to allow voters who are not affiliated with any party (i.e. "independent") to participate in the party's primary. The passage of Proposition 14 limited this "modified" closed primary system to primaries for President of the United States, starting with the 2012 primaries. Since the adoption of the "modified" closed primary system, the California Republican Party has allowed "independent" voters to vote in Republican primaries only in 2004, 2006, 2008, and 2010 (for 2008, the allowance applied to all primaries except for the presidential primary).

== Governance ==
The California Republican Party is a "political party that has detailed statutory provisions applicable to its operation", which are in division 7, part 3 of the California Elections Code. The Republican State Central Committee (RSCC), the governing body of the California Republican Party, functions pursuant to its standing rules and bylaws. The RSCC works together with the Republican county central committees and district central committees, with county central committees appointing delegates to the RSCC. The regular officers of the RSCC are the chairman, state vice chairman, eight regional vice chairmen, secretary, and treasurer.

=== County central committees ===
There are semi-autonomous county central committees for each of California's 58 counties. At every direct primary election (presidential primary) or when district boundaries are redrawn, their members are either elected by supervisor district or Assembly district depending on the county.

County central committees
County party	Elected members
Republican Party of Los Angeles County	Assembly district committee members elected at the direct primary elections.
Republican Party of San Diego County	Six regular members elected from each Assembly district in the county.
Republican Party of Orange County	Six members elected from each Assembly district.

=== Party chairs ===
- Gustave Brenner (1912–14)
- Francis V. Keesling (1914–16)
- Chester H. Rowell (1916–18)
- Raymond Benjamin (1918–22)
- Albert E. Boynton (1922–1924)
- Charles L. Neumiller (1924–28)
- Frank F. Merriam (1928–30)
- Marshal Hale (1930–34)
- Louis B. Mayer (1932–33)
- Earl Warren (1934–36)
- Justus Craemer (1936–38)
- Bradford Melvin (1938–40)
- Thomas Kuchel (1940–42)
- Edward Tickle (1942–44)
- Leo Anderson (1944–46)
- Arthur W. Carlson (1946–48)
- Sim Delapp (1948–50)
- Laughlin Waters (1950–54)
- Thomas W. Caldecott (1954–56)
- Alphonzo E. Bell, Jr. (1956–58)
- George W. Milias (1958–60)
- John Krehbiel (1960–62)
- Caspar Weinberger (1962–64)
- Gaylord Parkinson (1964–67)
- James Halley (1967–69)
- Dennis Carpenter (1969–71)
- Putnam Livermore (1971–73)
- Gordon Luce (1973–75)
- Paul Haerle (1975–77)
- Michael B. Montgomery (1977–79)
- Truman Campbell (1979–81)
- Tirso del Junco (1981–83)
- Ed Reinecke (1983–85)
- Mike Antonovich (1985–87)
- Bob Naylor (1987–89)
- Frank Visco (1989–91)
- Jim Dignan (1991–93)
- Tirso del Junco (1993–95)
- John Herrington (1995–97)
- Michael J. Schroeder (1997–99)
- John McGraw (1999–2001)
- Shawn Steel (2001–03)
- George "Duf" Sundheim (2003–07)
- Ron Nehring (2007–11)
- Tom Del Beccaro (2011–13)
- Jim Brulte (2013–19)
- Jessica Millan Patterson (2019–2025)
- Corrin Rankin (since 2025)

=== California Republican Party biannual conventions ===
The California Republican Party typically holds its convention on a biannual basis. (Note: The bylaws of the California Republican Party do not mandate biannual conventions, but the bylaws refer to a "fall convention" and a "spring convention".)

Recent conventions are listed below:

- February 1996: Hyatt Regency San Francisco Airport
- October 2017: Anaheim
- February 2019: Hyatt Regency, downtown Sacramento
- April 2022: Anaheim
- September/October 2023: Anaheim
- March 2025: SAFE Credit Union Convention Center, Sacramento
- September 2025: Garden Grove

== Election results ==
=== Presidential ===
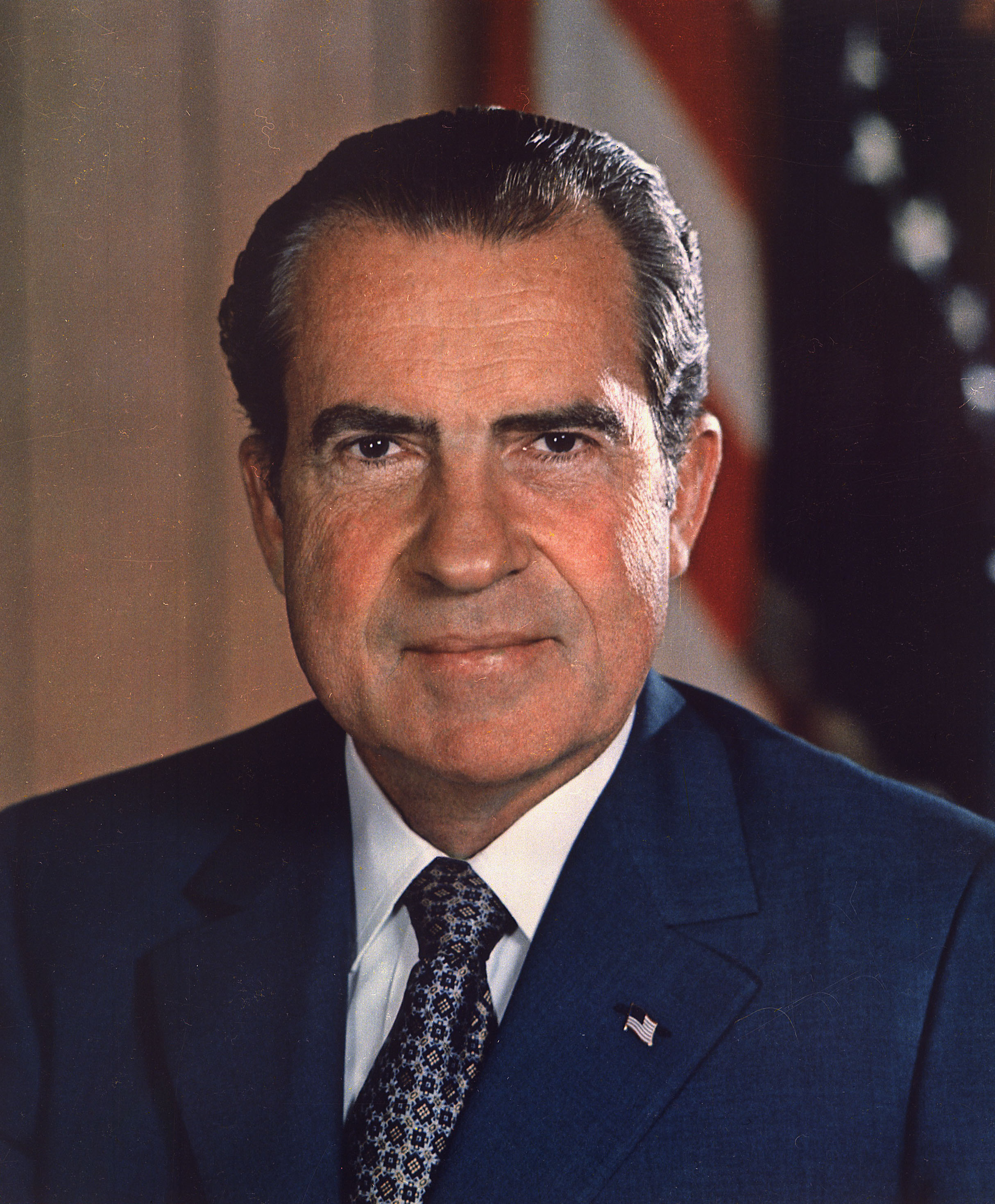
President Richard Nixon (1969−1974), whose home state was California

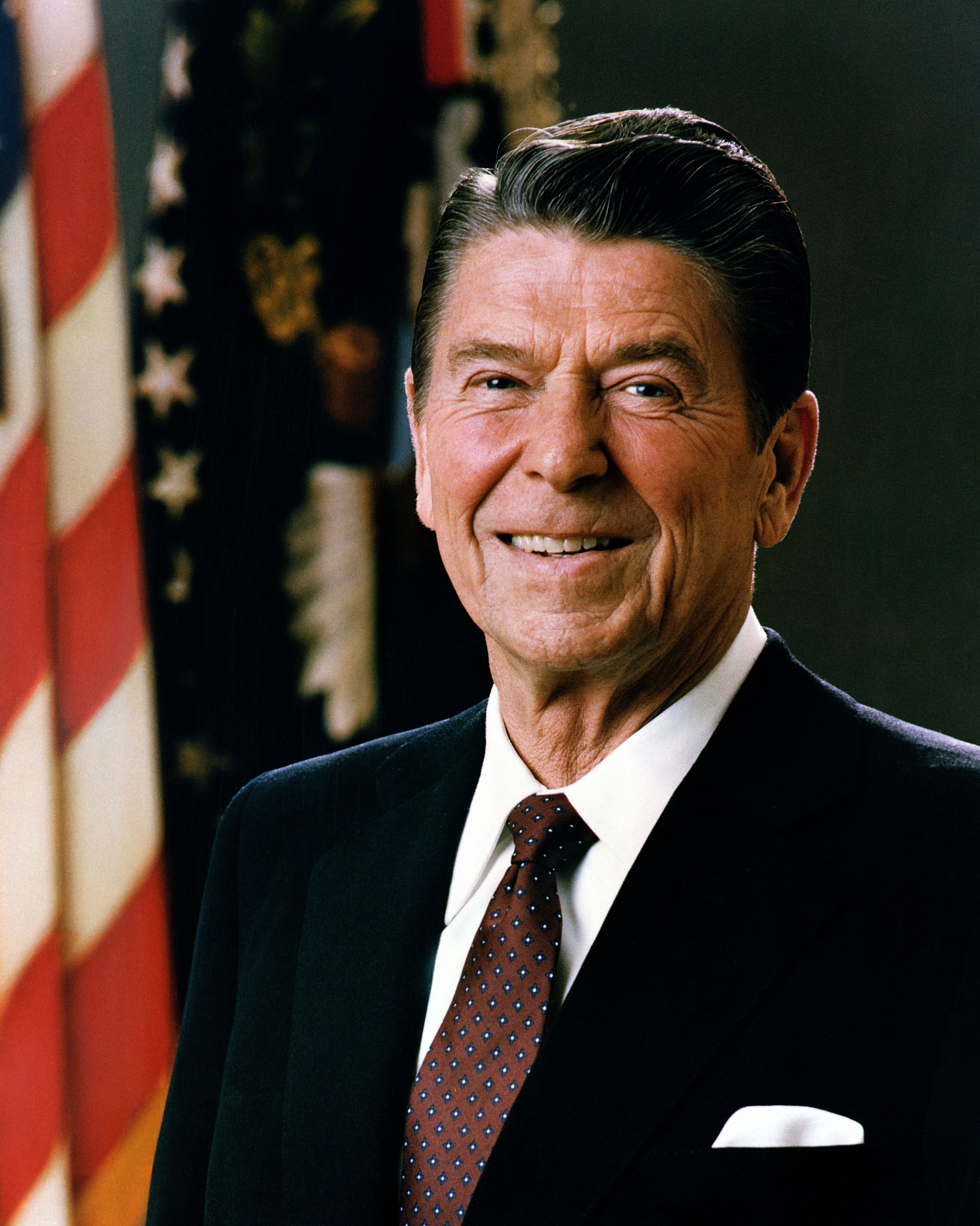
President Ronald Reagan (1981−1989), whose home state was California

California Republican Party presidential election results
Election	Presidential ticket	Votes	Vote %	Electoral votes	Result (Note: Result of the national electoral vote count)
1856	John C. Frémont/William L. Dayton	20,704	18.78%	0 / 4	Lost
1860	Abraham Lincoln/Hannibal Hamlin	38,733	32.32%	4 / 4	Won
1864	Abraham Lincoln/Andrew Johnson	62,053	58.60%	5 / 5	Won
1868	Ulysses S. Grant/Schuyler Colfax	54,588	50.24%	5 / 5	Won
1872	Ulysses S. Grant/Henry Wilson	54,007	56.38%	6 / 6	Won
1876	Rutherford B. Hayes/William A. Wheeler	79,258	50.88%	6 / 6	Won
1880	James A. Garfield/Chester A. Arthur	80,282	48.89%	1 / 6	Won
1884	James G. Blaine/John A. Logan	102,369	51.97%	8 / 8	Lost
1888	Benjamin Harrison/Levi P. Morton	124,816	49.66%	8 / 8	Won
1892	Benjamin Harrison/Whitelaw Reid	118,027	43.78%	1 / 9	Lost
1896	William McKinley/Garret Hobart	146,688	49.16%	8 / 9	Won
1900	William McKinley/Theodore Roosevelt	164,755	54.50%	9 / 9	Won
1904	Theodore Roosevelt/Charles W. Fairbanks	205,226	61.84%	10 / 10	Won
1908	William Howard Taft/James S. Sherman	214,398	55.46%	10 / 10	Won
1912	State party ran Theodore Roosevelt/Hiram Johnson (Progressive)	283,610	41.83%	11 / 13	Lost
1916	Charles E. Hughes/Charles W. Fairbanks	462,516	46.27%	0 / 13	Lost
1920	Warren G. Harding/Calvin Coolidge	624,992	66.20%	13 / 13	Won
1924	Calvin Coolidge/Charles G. Dawes	733,250	57.20%	13 / 13	Won
1928	Herbert Hoover/Charles Curtis	1,162,323	64.69%	13 / 13	Won
1932	Herbert Hoover/Charles Curtis	847,902	37.39%	0 / 22	Lost
1936	Alf Landon/Frank Knox	836,431	31.70%	0 / 22	Lost
1940	Wendell Willkie/Charles L. McNary	1,351,419	41.34%	0 / 22	Lost
1944	Thomas E. Dewey/John W. Bricker	1,512,965	42.97%	0 / 25	Lost
1948	Thomas E. Dewey/Earl Warren	1,895,269	47.13%	0 / 25	Lost
1952	Dwight D. Eisenhower/Richard Nixon	2,897,310	56.35%	32 / 32	Won
1956	Dwight D. Eisenhower/Richard Nixon	3,027,668	55.39%	32 / 32	Won
1960	Richard Nixon/Henry Cabot Lodge Jr.	3,259,722	50.10%	32 / 32	Lost
1964	Barry Goldwater/William E. Miller	2,879,108	40.79%	0 / 40	Lost
1968	Richard Nixon/Spiro Agnew	3,467,664	47.82%	40 / 40	Won
1972	Richard Nixon/Spiro Agnew	4,602,096	55.00%	45 / 45	Won
1976	Gerald Ford/Bob Dole	3,882,244	49.35%	45 / 45	Lost
1980	Ronald Reagan/George H. W. Bush	4,524,858	52.69%	45 / 45	Won
1984	Ronald Reagan/George H. W. Bush	5,467,009	57.51%	47 / 47	Won
1988	George H. W. Bush/Dan Quayle	5,054,917	51.13%	47 / 47	Won
1992	George H. W. Bush/Dan Quayle	3,630,574	32.61%	0 / 54	Lost
1996	Bob Dole/Jack Kemp	3,828,380	38.21%	0 / 54	Lost
2000	George W. Bush/Dick Cheney	4,567,429	41.65%	0 / 54	Won
2004	George W. Bush/Dick Cheney	5,509,826	44.36%	0 / 55	Won
2008	John McCain/Sarah Palin	5,011,781	36.95%	0 / 55	Lost
2012	Mitt Romney/Paul Ryan	4,839,958	37.12%	0 / 55	Lost
2016	Donald Trump/Mike Pence	4,483,810	31.62%	0 / 55	Won
2020	Donald Trump/Mike Pence	6,006,429	34.32%	0 / 55	Lost
2024	Donald Trump/JD Vance	6,081,697	38.33%	0 / 54	Won

=== Gubernatorial ===
California Republican Party gubernatorial election results
Election	Gubernatorial candidate	Votes	Vote %	Result
1857	Edward Stanly	21,040	22.46%	Lost ✗
1859	Leland Stanford	10,110	9.84%	Lost ✗
1861	Leland Stanford	56,036	46.41%	Won ✓
1863	Frederick Low	64,283	59.03%	Won ✓
1867	George Congdon Gorham	40,359	43.71%	Lost ✗
1871	Newton Booth	62,561	52.11%	Won ✓
1875	Timothy Guy Phelps	31,322	25.48%	Lost ✗
1879	George Clement Perkins	67,965	42.42%	Won ✓
1882	Morris M. Estee	67,175	40.79%	Lost ✗
1886	John Franklin Swift	84,316	43.10%	Lost ✗
1890	Henry Markham	125,129	49.56%	Won ✓
1894	Morris M. Estee	110,738	38.92%	Lost ✗
1898	Henry Gage	148,354	51.68%	Won ✓
1902	George Pardee	146,332	48.06%	Won ✓
1906	James Gillett	125,887	40.4%	Won ✓
1910	Hiram Johnson	177,191	45.94%	Won ✓
1914	John D. Fredericks	271,990	29.35%	Lost ✗
1918	William Stephens	387,547	56.28%	Won ✓
1922	Friend Richardson	576,445	59.69%	Won ✓
1926	C. C. Young	814,815	71.22%	Won ✓
1930	James Rolph Jr.	999,393	72.22%	Won ✓
1934	Frank Merriam	1,138,629	48.87%	Won ✓
1938	Frank Merriam	1,171,019	44.17%	Lost ✗
1942	Earl Warren	1,275,237	57.07%	Won ✓
1946	Earl Warren	2,344,542	91.64%	Won ✓
1950	Earl Warren	2,461,754	64.86%	Won ✓
1954	Goodwin Knight	2,290,519	56.83%	Won ✓
1958	William Knowland	2,110,911	40.16%	Lost ✗
1962	Richard Nixon	2,740,351	46.87%	Lost ✗
1966	Ronald Reagan	3,742,913	57.55%	Won ✓
1970	Ronald Reagan	3,439,174	52.83%	Won ✓
1974	Houston Flournoy	2,952,954	47.25%	Lost ✗
1978	Evelle Younger	2,526,534	36.50%	Lost ✗
1982	George Deukmejian	3,881,014	49.28%	Won ✓
1986	George Deukmejian	4,505,601	60.54%	Won ✓
1990	Pete Wilson	3,791,904	49.25%	Won ✓
1994	Pete Wilson	4,781,766	55.18%	Won ✓
1998	Dan Lungren	3,218,030	38.38%	Lost ✗
2002	Bill Simon	3,169,801	42.40%	Lost ✗
2003 (recall)	Arnold Schwarzenegger (best-performing)	4,206,284	48.6%	Won ✓
2006	Arnold Schwarzenegger	4,850,157	55.88%	Won ✓
2010	Meg Whitman	4,127,391	40.9%	Lost ✗
2014	Neel Kashkari	2,929,213	40.03%	Lost ✗
2018	John H. Cox	4,742,825	38.05%	Lost ✗
2021 (recall)	Larry Elder (best-performing)	3,563,867	48.41%	Recall failed
2022	Brian Dahle	4,462,914	40.82%	Lost ✗
2026	Steve Hilton	3,575,025	34.5%	Lost ✗

== See also ==
- California State Assembly Republican Caucus
- Pasadena Republican Club, the oldest continuously active Republican club in America
