= Heath Flora =

American politician (born 1983)

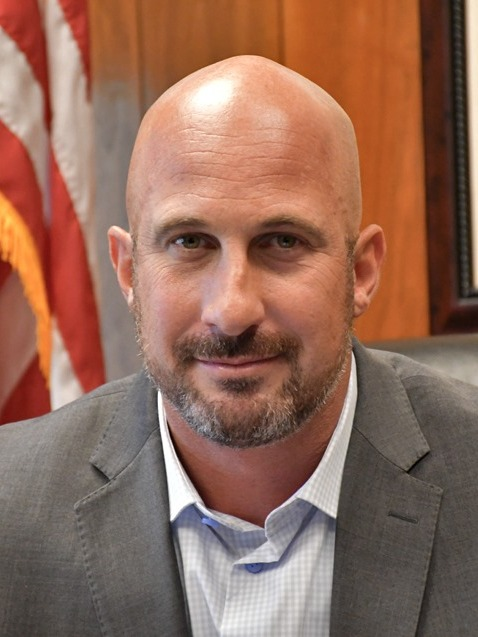
- Official portrait, 2020

Minority Leader of the California Assembly
- In office September 16, 2025 – August 3, 2026
- Preceded by: James Gallagher
- Succeeded by: Alexandra Macedo

Member of the California State Assembly
- Incumbent
- Assumed office December 5, 2016
- Preceded by: Kristin Olsen
- Constituency: 12th district (2016–2022); 9th district (2022–present)

Personal details
- Born: Heath Hubert Flora; July 19, 1983 (age 43) Stanislaus County, California, U.S.
- Party: Republican
- Spouse: Melodie Flora (divorced)
- Children: 2
- Education: Modesto Junior College (AA)
- Website: State Assembly website

Heath Hubert Flora (born July 19, 1983) is an American politician in the California State Assembly. He represents the northern San Joaquin Valley, including the cities of Manteca and Lodi. Flora served as the Minority Leader of the California State Assembly from September 16, 2025 to August 3, 2026.

== Early life ==
On July 19, 1983, Flora was born in Stanislaus County, California.

== Career ==
Flora served for over 15 years as a volunteer fire fighter. From 2005 to 2007, Flora was a firefighter with the California Department Forestry and Fire Protection. Flora is a businessman and owner of Golden Valley Equipment.

In 2016, Flora's political career began when he ran for the California State Assembly to succeed fellow Republican Kristen Olsen, who ran successfully for the Stanislaus County Board of Supervisors. In a surprise, he won the election and became a Republican member of California State Assembly for District 12, encompassing part of the San Joaquin Valley. Flora defeated Ken Vogel, a former San Joaquin County Supervisor, with 52.2% of the votes in an upset.

On November 6, 2018, as an incumbent, Flora won the election and continued serving District 12. Flora defeated Robert D. Chase with 60% of the votes.

In Flora's first term as a member of the Assembly, Flora authored seven bills that were ultimately signed into law, including bills to develop a firefighter pre-apprenticeship program and to reduce the impact of property taxes on new construction.

In 2020, Flora was reelected with 67% over Lathrop City Councilman Paul Akinjo.

=== Controversies ===
In November 2020, amidst the COVID-19 pandemic, Heath Flora travelled to Hawaii to attend a conference with 120 other people.

Following the 2022 sale of his Ripon home, Flora registered to vote at his parents’ property in Modesto. However, reports indicated the property, also registered to his family’s business, was occupied by relatives while Flora resided in Sacramento. Because his Modesto registration is over 50 miles from the Capitol, Flora was eligible for taxpayer-funded tax-free per diem stipends, receiving $42,416 in 2024.

In 2024, Flora spent $606,213 from his campaign account, a significant portion of which was used for meals in Sacramento and travel to Las Vegas. While labeled as "district meetings" in campaign finance filings, many of these expenditures occurred on weekends or during legislative recess at locations outside of Flora’s district.

In July 2025, the Assembly Republican caucus voted unanimously to make Flora the next Republican leader, succeeding term-limited minority leader James Gallagher when he resigns on September 16, 2025.

On August 3, 2026, Flora was ousted as the Republican leader of the California State Assembly

== Electoral history ==
2016 California State Assembly 12th district election
Primary election
Party	Candidate	Votes	%
Republican	Ken Vogel	23,678	25.6
Republican	Heath Flora	21,484	23.2
Democratic	Virginia Madueno	19,764	21.4
Democratic	Harinder Grewal	17,245	18.6
Republican	Cindy Marks	10,397	11.2
Total votes		92,568	100.0
General election
Republican	Heath Flora	81,680	52.3
Republican	Ken Vogel	74,433	47.7
Total votes		156,113	100.0
Republican hold			

2018 California State Assembly 12th district election
Primary election
Party	Candidate	Votes	%
Republican	Heath Flora (incumbent)	56,212	63.9
Democratic	Robert D. Chase	31,811	36.1
Total votes		88,023	100.0
General election
Republican	Heath Flora (incumbent)	94,404	60.0
Democratic	Robert D. Chase	62,811	40.0
Total votes		157,215	100.0
Republican hold			

2020 California State Assembly 12th district election
Primary election
Party	Candidate	Votes	%
Republican	Heath Flora (incumbent)	71,098	62.9
Democratic	Paul Akinjo	41,859	37.1
Total votes		112,957	100.0
General election
Republican	Heath Flora (incumbent)	131,625	60.9
Democratic	Paul Akinjo	84,373	39.1
Total votes		215,998	100.0
Republican hold			

2022 California State Assembly 9th district election
Primary election
Party	Candidate	Votes	%
Republican	Heath Flora (incumbent)	65,647	99.8
Democratic	Mushtaq A. Tahirkheli (write-in)	142	0.2
Total votes		65,789	100.0
General election
Republican	Heath Flora (incumbent)	96,990	69.2
Democratic	Mushtaq A. Tahirkheli	43,109	30.8
Total votes		140,099	100.0
Republican gain from Democratic			

2024 California State Assembly 9th district election
Primary election
Party	Candidate	Votes	%
Republican	Heath Flora (incumbent)	65,952	73.2
American Independent	Tami Nobriga	21,946	24.4
Democratic	Rosella Rowlison (write-in)	2,139	2.4
Democratic	Belinda Smith (write-in)	87	0.1
Total votes		90,124	100.0
General election
Republican	Heath Flora (incumbent)	129,268	70.1
American Independent	Tami Nobriga	55,169	29.9
Total votes		184,437	100.0
Republican hold			

== Personal life ==
Flora has two children. In 2015, Flora and his family moved from Modesto to Ripon, California, where he no longer lives. Flora’s wife, Melodie, filed for divorce in April 2022 in San Joaquin County Superior Court.

In July 2022, a woman named Emily Hughes claimed that Flora had multiple extra-marital affairs, one of which was with her. Hughes' affair with Flora took place while Hughes worked as a lobbyist for the California Medical Association and Flora was serving on the Assembly Health Committee which deals with issues of interest to the California Medical Association. In August 2022, Flora promised to issue a formal statement about the affair, but has yet to issue a statement as of a week after the promise.

In 2023, court records from Flora’s divorce proceedings showed a failure to pay court-ordered child support, resulting in a wage garnishment request to the Assembly. A San Joaquin County Superior Court later ordered Flora to pay more than $16,000 in past-due support and healthcare expenses for his children.

California Assembly
Preceded by James Gallagher	Minority Leader of the California Assembly; 2025–2026	Succeeded by Alexandra Macedo
