= William E. Riker =

American White Supremacist leader

William Edward Riker
- Born: February 17, 1873; California
- Died: December 3, 1969 (aged 96); Agnews State Hospital, Santa Clara, California
- Occupations: preacher, con-artist, politician
- Spouse: Lucille Schutrum Jensen Riker (1874–1950)

William Edward Riker (February 17, 1873 – December 3, 1969) was a White supremacist religious leader and perennial candidate who founded the community of Holy City, California, and was an unsuccessful candidate for California Governor. Other nicknames included "Father", "The Comforter", "The Professor", "The Emancipator".

== Early life ==
Riker was born in California on February 17, 1873. He worked as a palm reader and later traveled as a mind reader under the professional name "Professor Riker". Riker moved to Canada rather than face charges of bigamy in San Francisco. In Canada, Riker established The Perfect Christian Divine Way (PCDW) and a religious doctrine which emphasized white supremacy, racial segregation, gender segregation, and abstinence from alcohol and sex. In 1918, the PCDW was incorporated by Riker, Irvin Fisher and Anna Schramm in Los Angeles.

== Religious commune leader ==
In 1918, Riker returned to the United States and purchased 75 acres (30 ha) of land near Los Gatos outside of San Jose. He used the property to found the religious commune of Holy City, which Riker said he had been instructed to do through messages from God. He married his fourth wife, "Mother" Lucille Schutrum Jensen Riker (1874–1950) which went against claims of celibacy. This marriage resulted in one of his early disciples, Frieda Schwartz, suing him in order to recuperate her money invested in PCDW. Schwartz lost the lawsuit but generated publicity and more tourism to the area as a result.

Eventually increasing the commune to 200 acres (81 ha), Riker developed it into a road-side tourist attraction which included an observatory, gas station, dance hall, restaurant and penny peep show machines. Along the roadway entering Holy City, Riker placed nine Santa Claus statues and a billboard that read "Headquarters for the World's Most Perfect Government."

In 1925 Riker added a radio station with the call letters KFQU, which broadcast popular programming as well as his personal message. The station closed after six years when Riker's license was revoked for "irregularities".

== Politics ==
Riker ran for political office on a White Supremacy platform, advocating that Black and Asian Americans be banned from owning businesses in California. In one of his political pamphlets titled The Emancipator, Riker wrote:

The White Man can take care of any and all kinds of business in our own, White Man's California State Home, and no longer will the White Man tolerate your undermining and polluting tactics. Farmers, Business Men and The Workers say: Orientals get out and stay out of our business. Our new Government will see that you get a job. Your polluting, undermining system of business must eternally stop in Our California. And besides this, keep your polluting hands off our White Race Women; they also belong only to the White Race Man. This is the true law of our original White Man's Constitution, these statements explain the real and true spirit of California.

He unsuccessfully ran for Governor of California four times. In 1938, he entered the Progressive Party primary and received only 170 of the approximately 7,500 total votes cast. In the subsequent three elections, he entered both the Republican and Democratic primaries. Riker lost the primaries in 1942, 1946 and 1950, averaging less than one percent of the total votes.

Riker was arrested by the FBI in 1942 for sedition due to his support of Adolf Hitler whom Riker called "a second Martin Luther". A jury acquitted Riker, who then sued his attorney Melvin Belli for defamation because Belli's successful defense was to present Riker as a "crackpot." Riker lost the suit.

== Decline and death ==
The 1940 re-routing of California State Route 17 to bypass Holy City caused a decline in visitors. Financial difficulties eventually led to Riker losing control of the community in 1960. In 1966, at the age of 93, Riker converted to Catholicism.

Riker died on December 3, 1969, at Agnews State Hospital, in Santa Clara, California.
