= 2022 Anaheim mayoral election =

- November 8, 2022
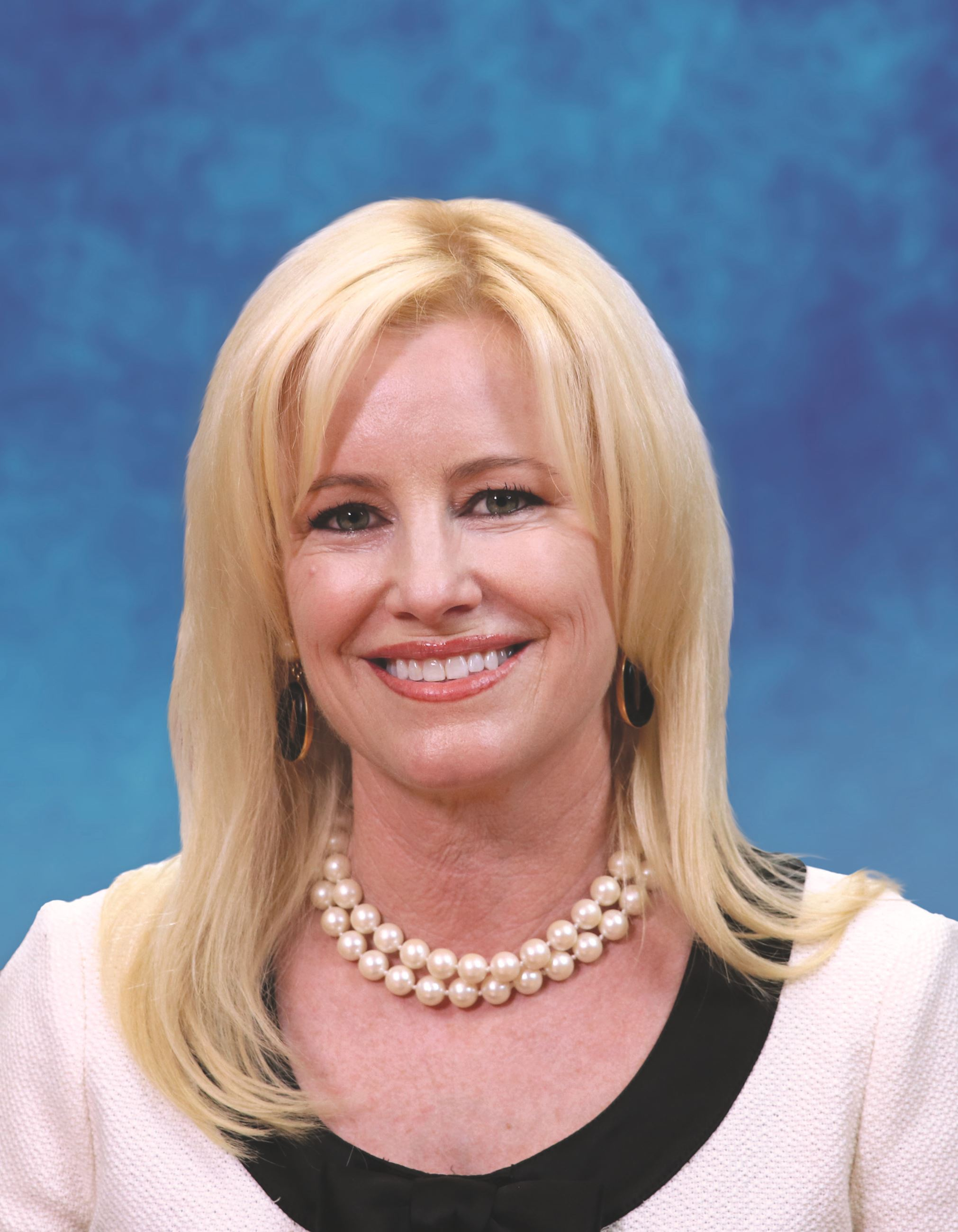

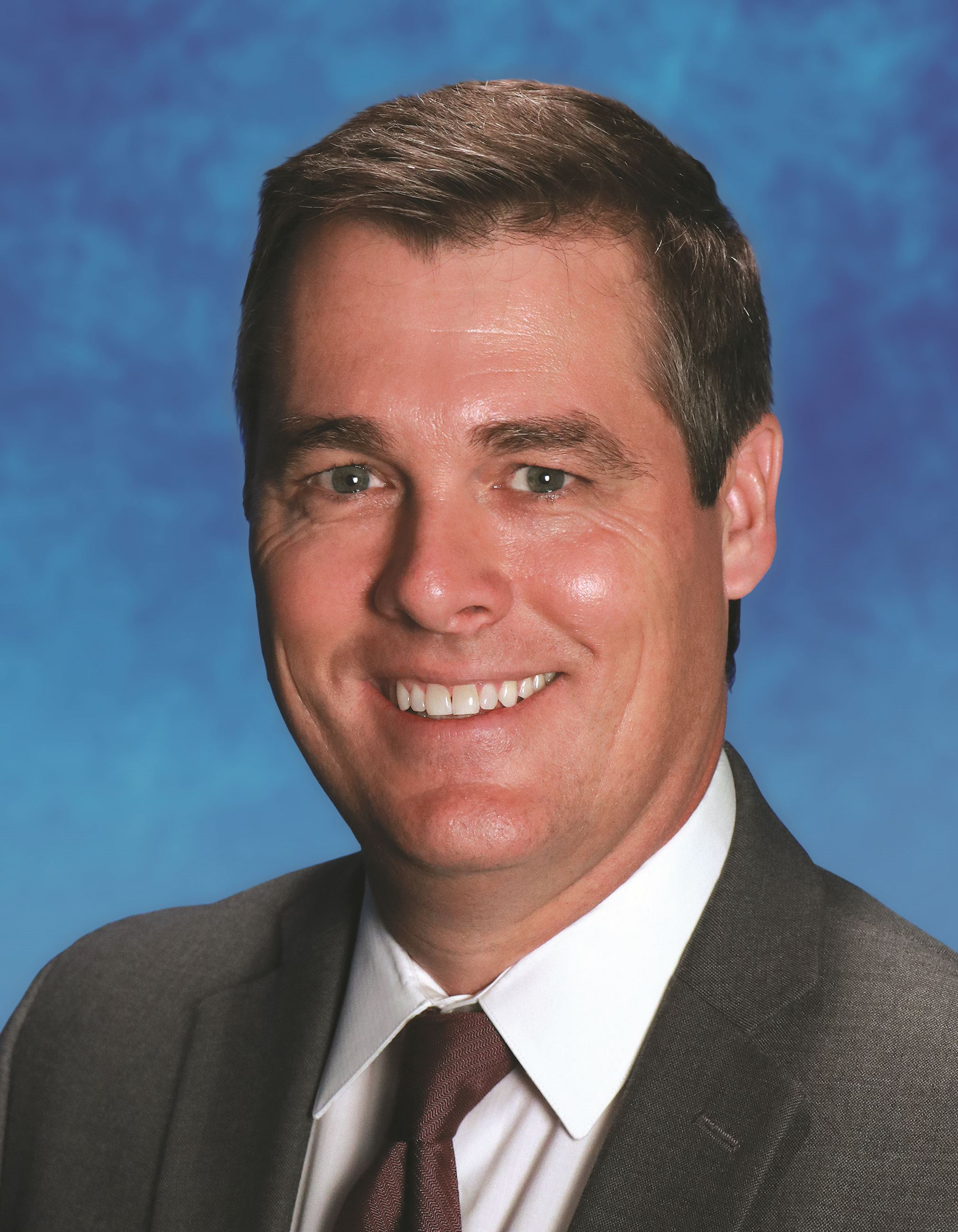

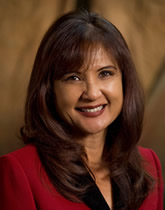

Candidate	Ashleigh Aitken	Trevor O’Neil
Popular vote	28,493	22,948
Percentage	42.85%	34.51%
Candidate	Lorri Galloway	Dick Lopez
Popular vote	11,282	3,770
Percentage	16.97%	5.67%
- City council district results Aitken: 40–50% O'Neil: 40–50%
Mayor before election
Vacant
Trevor O'Neil (acting)
Elected mayor
Ashleigh Aitken

The 2022 Anaheim mayoral election was held on Tuesday November 8, to elect the next mayor of Anaheim, California. Municipal elections in California were officially nonpartisan; candidates' party affiliations do not appear on the ballot.

One-term mayor Harry Sidhu, who was elected in 2018 with 32.5% of the vote, resigned in May 2022 amid corruption allegations and an investigation by the FBI regarding the sale of Angel Stadium. Afterwards, the office of mayor remained vacant, with mayor pro tempore Trevor O'Neil serving in an acting capacity.

Attorney Ashleigh Aitken won the election, becoming the first woman elected mayor of Anaheim and the first Democrat to serve as mayor since 2002.

== Candidates ==
- Ashleigh Aitken (Democratic), attorney and candidate for mayor in 2018
- Lorri Galloway (Democratic), former city councilwoman and candidate for mayor in 2014 and 2018
- Dick Lopez (Independent), water systems operator
- Trevor O'Neil (Republican), mayor pro tempore and city councilman

=== Withdrew ===
- Harry Sidhu (Republican), former mayor

== Endorsements ==
Ashleigh Aitken

Newspapers

- The Orange County Register

Organizations

- Anaheim Firefighters Association
Trevor O'Neil

State legislators

- Phillip Chen, state assemblyman from the 55th district
- Steven Choi, state assemblyman from the 68th district

County officials

- Donald P. Wagner, Orange County supervisor from the 3rd district

Organizations

- Anaheim Taxpayers Association
- Lincoln Club of Orange County

== Polling ==
Poll source	Date(s) administered	Sample size (Note: Key: A – all adults RV – registered voters LV – likely voters V – unclear)	Margin of error	Ashleigh Aitken	Lorri Galloway	Trevor O'Neil	Undecided
Public Opinion Strategies (Note: Poll conducted for O'Neil's campaign)	August 2022	– (RV)	± 4.9%	18%	18%	39%	25%

== Results ==
2022 Anaheim mayoral election
Candidate	Votes	%
Ashleigh Aitken	28,493	42.85
Trevor O'Neil (acting incumbent)	22,948	34.51
Lorri Galloway	11,282	16.97
Dick Lopez	3,770	5.67
Total votes	66,493	100.00

== Notes ==
Partisan clients
