= 2010 Anaheim mayoral election =

- November 2, 2010
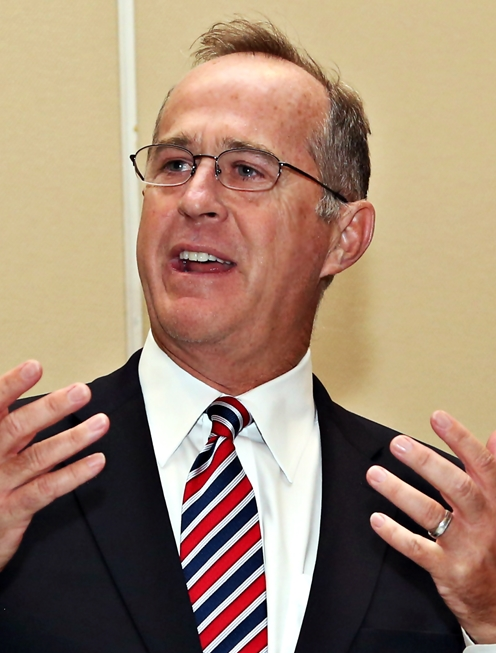

Candidate	Tom Tait	Shirley McCracken	Denis Fitzgerald
Popular vote	33,340	19,668	8,229
Percentage	54.4%	32.1%	13.4%
Mayor before election
Curt Pringle
Republican
Elected mayor
Tom Tait

The 2010 Anaheim mayoral election was held on November 2, 2010, to elect the mayor of Anaheim, California. It saw the election of Tom Tait.

Municipal elections in California are officially non-partisan.

== Results ==
Results
Candidate	Votes	%
Tom Tait	33,340	54.4
Shirley McCracken	19,668	32.1
Denis Fitzgerald	8,229	13.4
