= Electoral history of Jay Obernolte =

American politician electoral record

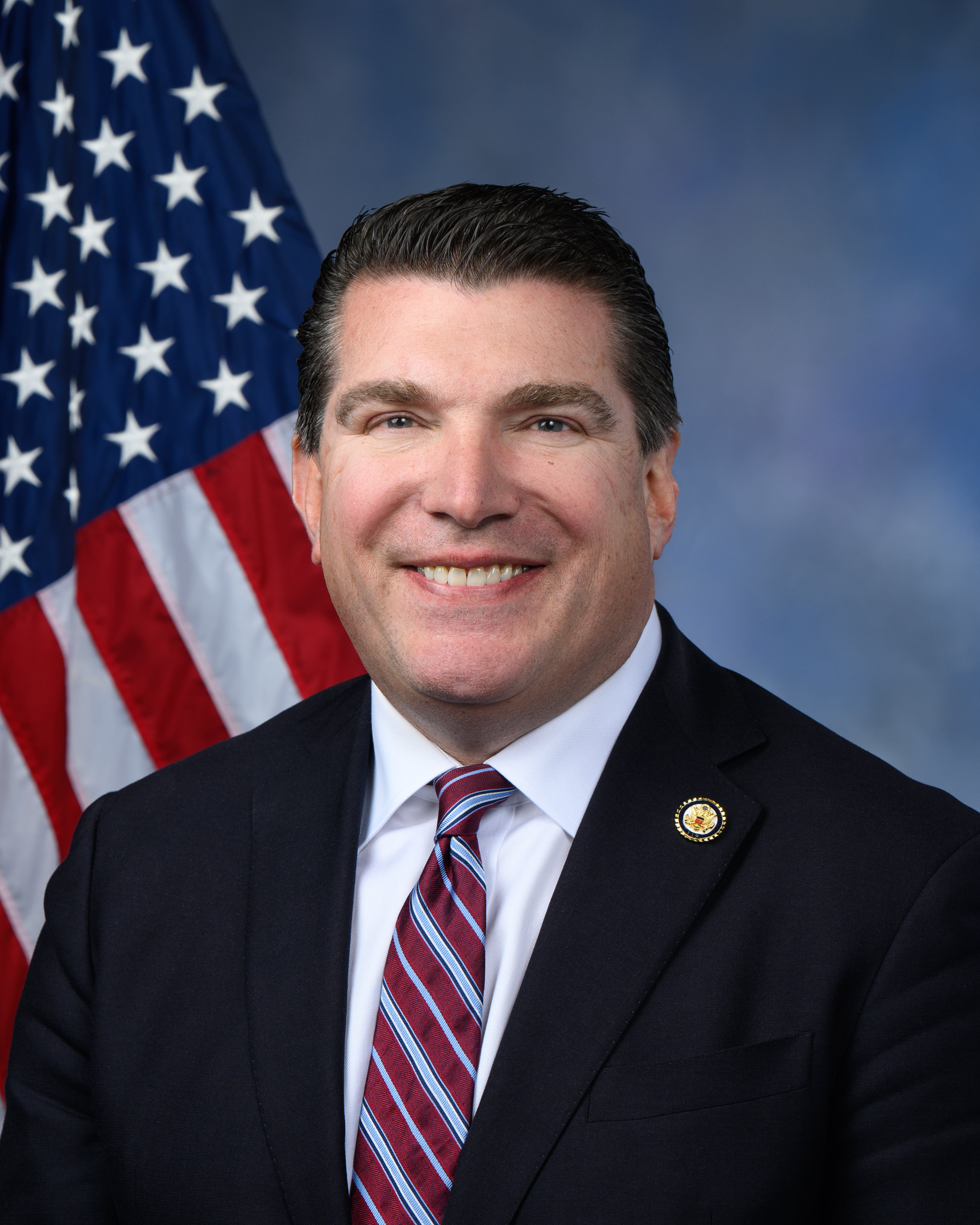
Official portrait, 2025

Jay Phillip Obernolte (/ˈoʊbərˌnoʊlti/ OH-bər-NOHL-tee; born August 18, 1970) is an American politician and businessman serving as the U.S. representative for California's 23rd district since 2021, when it was numbered as the 8th district. A Republican, he was previously a member of the California State Assembly representing the 33rd district. Before serving in the Assembly, Obernolte served on the city council and was the mayor of Big Bear Lake, California. He is the owner, president, and technical director of FarSight Studios, an American video game developer.

Obernolte is the only Republican to represent a district with territory in Los Angeles County.

== California State Assembly ==
=== 2014 California State Assembly election ===
On February 10, 2014, Obernolte announced his candidacy for the California State Assembly to succeed Tim Donnelly in the 33rd district.

Obernolte was endorsed by the California Republican Party, the San Bernardino County Republican party, the California Republican Assembly, The Press-Enterprise, the Howard Jarvis Taxpayers Association, Peace Officers Research Association of California (PORAC), San Bernardino County Safety Employee's Benefit Association (SEBA), the California Conservative Christians, and the Independent Voter Political Action Committee.

In the June primary, Obernolte finished second with 18.89% of the vote with 7,887 votes. He defeated Democrat John Coffey in the November general election with 65.9% of the vote.

2014 California's 33rd State Assembly district election
Primary election
| Party | Candidate | Votes | % |
|---|---|---|---|
| Democratic | John Coffey | 9,865 | 23.1 |
| Republican | Jay Obernolte | 8,028 | 18.8 |
| Republican | Michelle Ambrozic | 7,566 | 17.7 |
| Republican | Rick Roelle | 6,574 | 15.4 |
| Republican | Art Bishop | 5,956 | 14.0 |
| Republican | Brett Savage | 1,811 | 4.2 |
| Republican | Scott Markovich | 975 | 2.3 |
| Republican | Jerry J. Laws | 814 | 1.9 |
| Republican | Robert J. "Bob" Burhle | 802 | 1.9 |
| Republican | Robert Larivee | 299 | 0.7 |
| Total votes | | 45,690 | 100.0 |
General election
| Republican | Jay Obernolte | 46,144 | 65.9 |
| Democratic | John Coffey | 23,828 | 34.1 |
| Total votes | | 69,972 | 100.0 |
| Republican hold | | | |

=== 2016 California State Assembly election ===
On January 25, 2016, Obernolte announced he would seek reelection as the representative for California's 33rd Assembly District.

In the June primary, Obernolte finished first with 60.7% of the vote with 43,526 votes. He defeated Democrat Scott Markovich in the November general election with 60.6% of the vote.

2016 California's 33rd State Assembly district election
Primary election
| Party | Candidate | Votes | % |
|---|---|---|---|
| Republican | Jay Obernolte (incumbent) | 43,526 | 60.7 |
| Democratic | Scott Markovich | 28,220 | 39.3 |
| Total votes | | 71,746 | 100.0 |
General election
| Republican | Jay Obernolte (incumbent) | 84,000 | 60.6 |
| Democratic | Scott Markovich | 56,086 | 39.4 |
| Total votes | | 140,086 | 100.0 |
| Republican hold | | | |

=== 2018 California State Assembly election ===
2018 California's 33rd State Assembly district election
Primary election
| Party | Candidate | Votes | % |
|---|---|---|---|
| Republican | Jay Obernolte (incumbent) | 43,100 | 65.8 |
| Democratic | Socorro Cisneros | 12,566 | 19.2 |
| Democratic | Scott Markovich | 9,854 | 15.0 |
| Total votes | | 65,520 | 100.0 |
General election
| Republican | Jay Obernolte (incumbent) | 72,109 | 60.2 |
| Democratic | Socorro Cisneros | 47,603 | 39.8 |
| Total votes | | 119,712 | 100.0 |
| Republican hold | | | |

== U.S. House of Representatives ==
=== 2020 California congressional election ===
In September 2019, after Paul Cook announced his retirement from California's 8th congressional district, Obernolte announced his candidacy. The district covers most of the High Desert of San Bernardino County and Mono and Inyo counties.

In February 2020, President Donald Trump endorsed Obernolte on Twitter.

In the November 2020 election, Obernolte defeated Democratic nominee Chris Bubser with 56.1% of the vote to Bubser's 43.9%. Obernolte was sworn in to Congress on January 3, 2021, and appointed Freshman Class Representative to the House Republican Policy Committee.

2020 California's 8th congressional district primary results by county Map legend: Obernolte—30–40%; Bubser—30–40%; Bubser—40–50%

California's 8th congressional district, 2020
Primary election
| Party | Candidate | Votes | % |
|---|---|---|---|
| Republican | Jay Obernolte | 50,677 | 35.0 |
| Democratic | Christine Bubser | 41,595 | 28.7 |
| Republican | Tim Donnelly | 30,079 | 20.7 |
| Democratic | Bob Conaway | 9,053 | 6.2 |
| No party preference | Jeff Esmus | 4,042 | 2.8 |
| Democratic | James Ellars | 3,948 | 2.7 |
| Republican | Jeremy Staat | 2,288 | 1.6 |
| Republican | Jerry Laws | 2,010 | 1.4 |
| Republican | Justin David Whitehead | 1,305 | 0.9 |
| No party preference | J. Green (write-in) | 11 | 0.0 |
| Total votes | | 145,008 | 100.0 |
General election
| Republican | Jay Obernolte | 158,711 | 56.1 |
| Democratic | Christine Bubser | 124,400 | 43.9 |
| Total votes | | 283,111 | 100.0 |
| Republican hold | | | |

=== 2022 California congressional election ===
California's 23rd congressional district, 2022
Primary election
| Party | Candidate | Votes | % |
|---|---|---|---|
| Republican | Jay Obernolte (incumbent) | 57,988 | 60.9 |
| Democratic | Derek Marshall | 20,776 | 21.8 |
| Democratic | Bianca A. Gómez | 16,516 | 17.3 |
| Total votes | | 95,280 | 100.0 |
General election
| Republican | Jay Obernolte (incumbent) | 102,733 | 61.0% |
| Democratic | Derek Marshall | 65,655 | 39.0% |
| Total votes | | 168,388 | 100.0 |
| Republican hold | | | |

=== 2024 California congressional election ===
California's 23rd congressional district, 2024
Primary election
| Party | Candidate | Votes | % |
|---|---|---|---|
| Republican | Jay Obernolte (incumbent) | 70,208 | 63.4 |
| Democratic | Derek Marshall | 40,477 | 36.6 |
| Total votes | | 110,685 | 100.0 |
General election
| Republican | Jay Obernolte (incumbent) | 159,286 | 60.1 |
| Democratic | Derek Marshall | 105,563 | 39.9 |
| Total votes | | 264,849 | 100.0 |
| Republican hold | | | |
