= 2002 Anaheim mayoral election =

- November 5, 2002
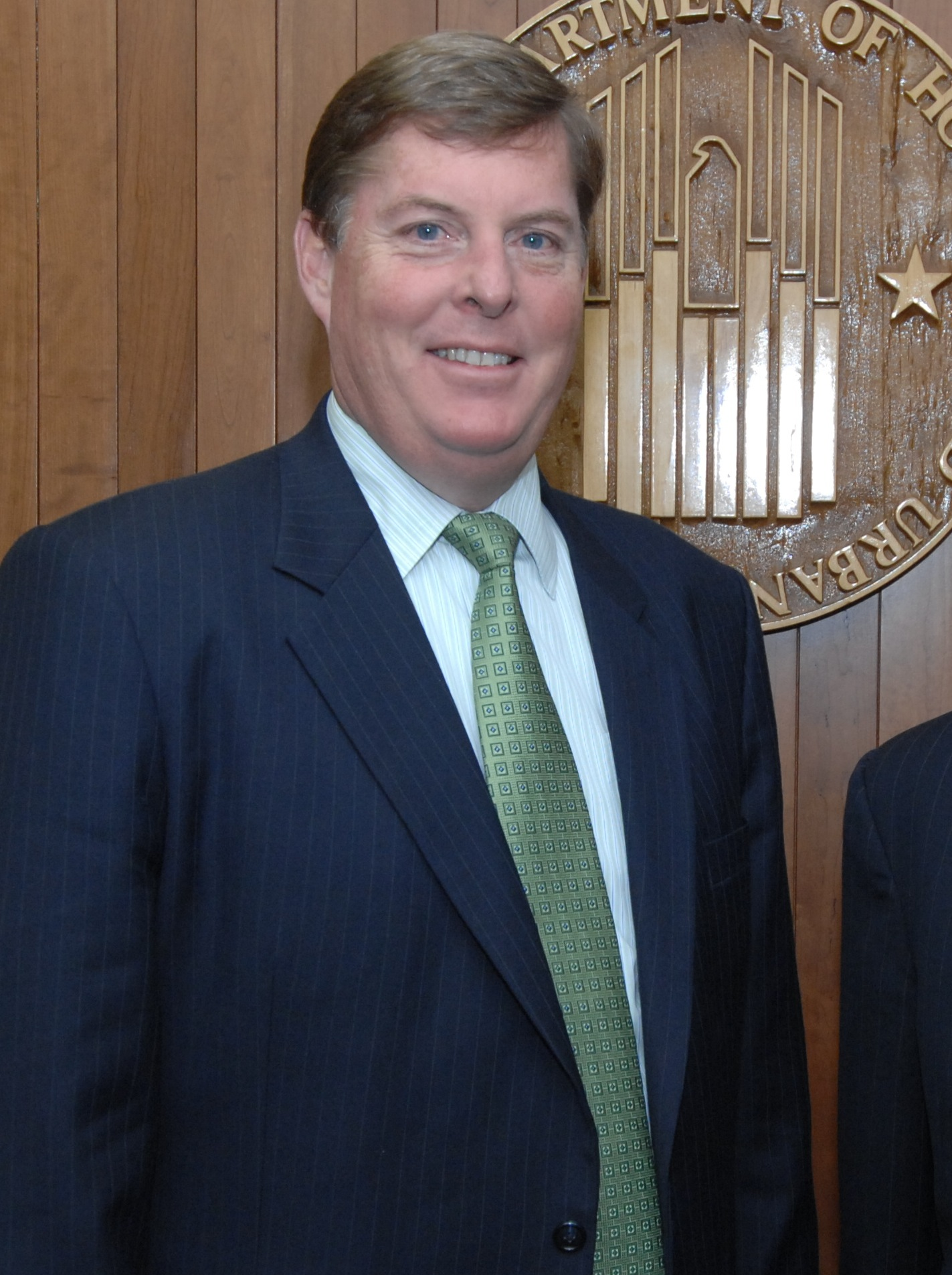

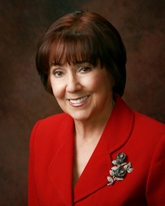

| Candidate | Curt Pringle | Lucille Kring |
| Party | Republican | Republican |
| Popular vote | 16,146 | 12,142 |
| Percentage | 35.9% | 27.0% |
| Candidate | Frank Feldhaus | Steve Staveley |
| Party | Nonpartisan | Nonpartisan |
| Popular vote | 9,783 | 6,928 |
| Percentage | 21.7% | 15.4% |
Mayor before election
Tom Daly
Democratic
Elected mayor
Curt Pringle
Republican

The 2002 Anaheim mayoral election was held on November 5, 2002, to elect the mayor of Anaheim, California. It saw the election of Curt Pringle.

== Results ==
Results
| Candidate | Votes | % |
|---|---|---|
| Curt Pringle | 16,146 | 35.9 |
| Lucille Kring | 12,142 | 27.0 |
| Frank Feldhaus | 9,783 | 21.7 |
| Steve Staveley | 6,928 | 15.4 |
