= 2018 Anaheim mayoral election =

- November 6, 2018
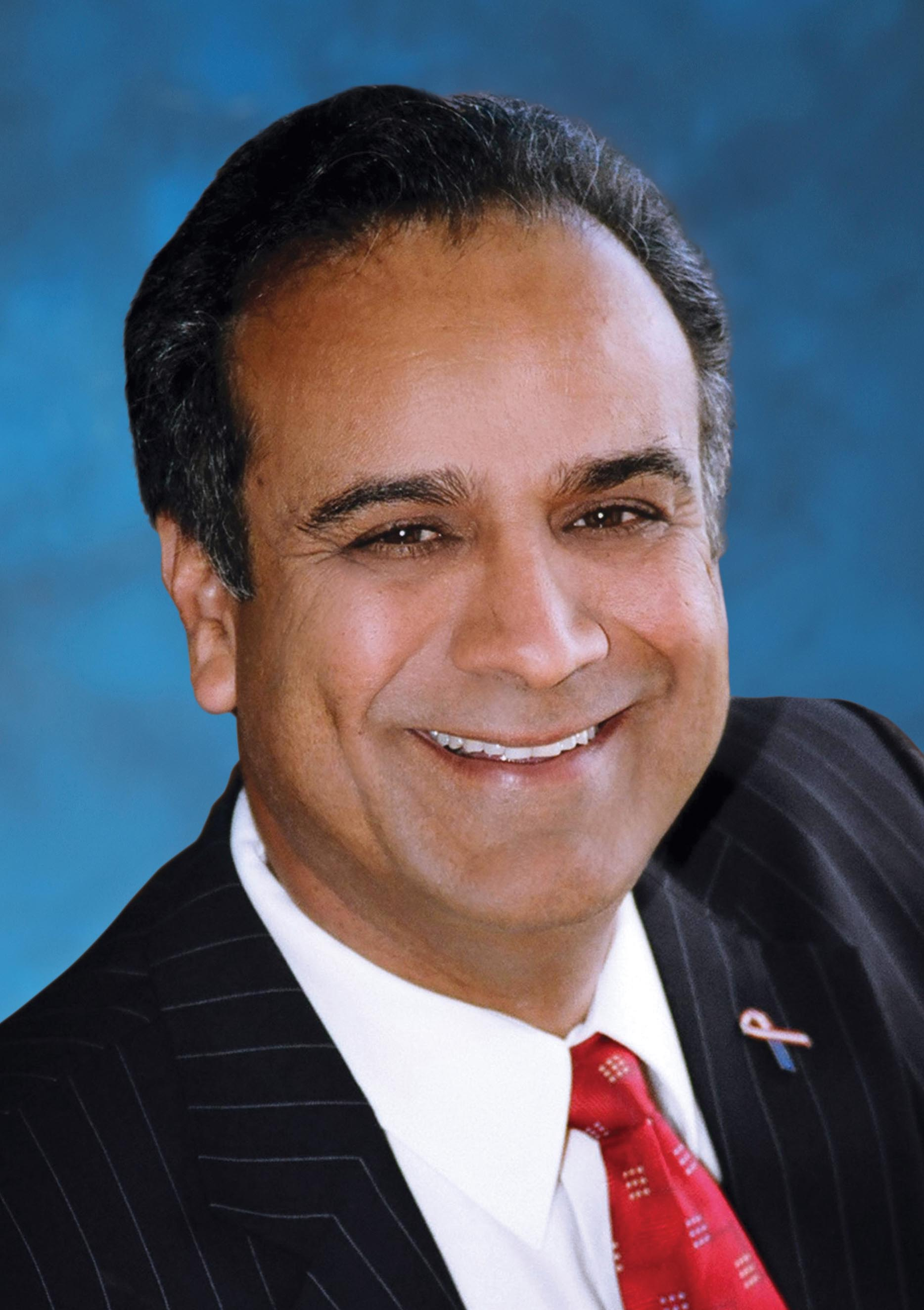

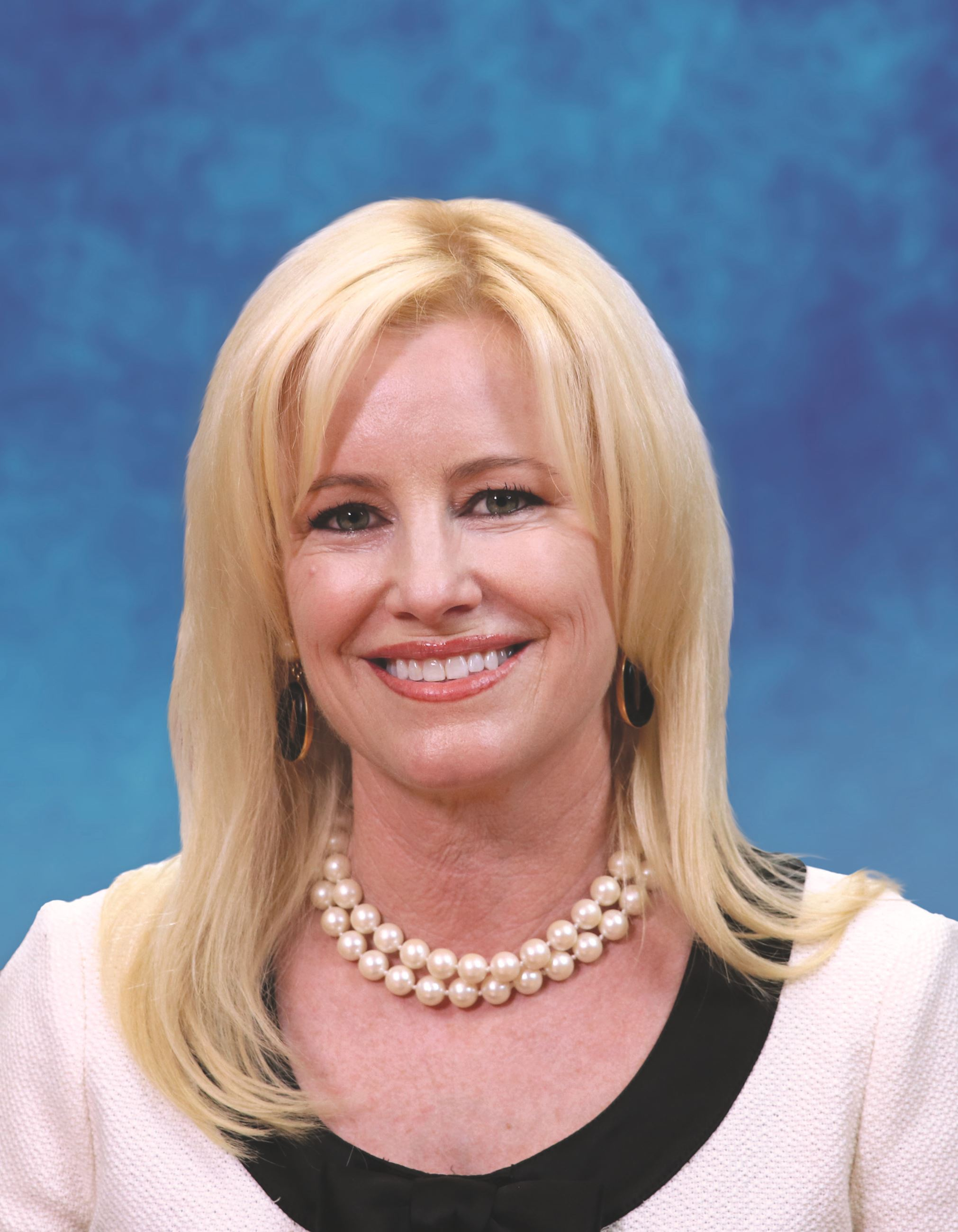

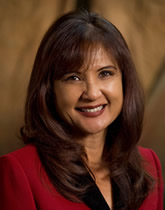

Candidate	Harry Sidhu	Ashleigh Aitken
Popular vote	26,422	25,944
Percentage	32.5%	31.9%
Candidate	Lorri Galloway	Cynthia Ward
Popular vote	12,367	7,121
Percentage	15.2%	8.7%
- Results by city council district Sidhu: 40–50% Aitken: 30–40%
Mayor before election
Tom Tait
Elected mayor
Harry Sidhu

The 2018 Anaheim mayoral election was held on November 6, 2018, to elect the mayor of Anaheim, California. It saw the election of Harry Sidhu. Sidhu is the first person of color to serve as mayor of Anaheim and the first Sikh to serve as the city's mayor.

Municipal elections in California are officially non-partisan.

== Results ==
2018 Anaheim mayoral election
Candidate	Votes	%
Harry Sidhu	26,422	32.5%
Ashleigh Aitken	25,944	31.9%
Lorri Galloway	12,367	15.2%
Cynthia Ward	7,121	8.7%
H. Fuji Shioura	3,024	3.7%
Robert Williams	2,824	3.5%
Rudy Gaona	2,506	3.1%
Tony D. Martin	1,199	1.5%
Total votes	81,407	100%
