= Avelino Valencia =

American politician

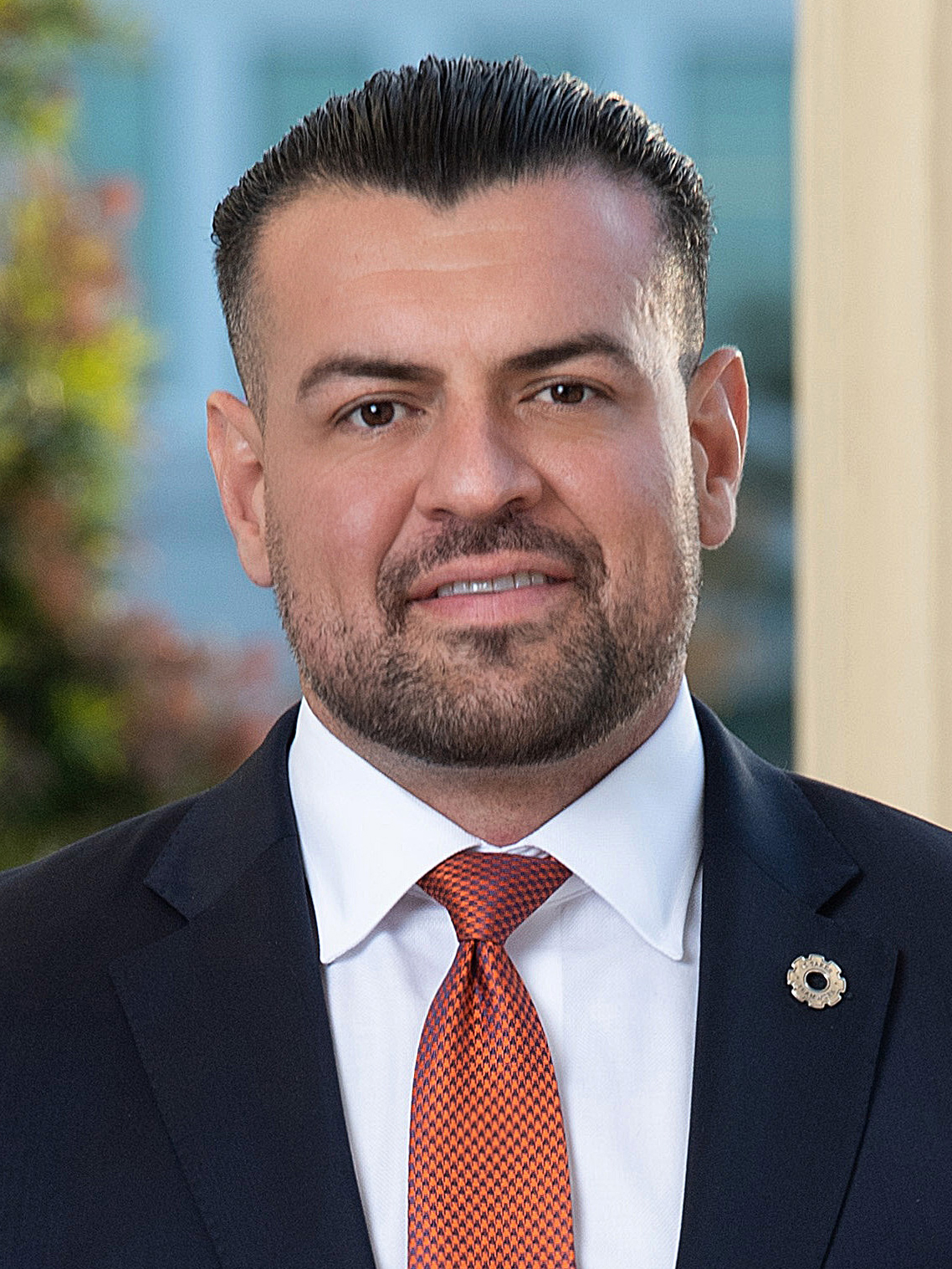
- Official portrait, 2022

Member-elect of the California Senate from the 34th district
- Assuming office December 7, 2026
- Succeeding: Tom Umberg

Member of the California State Assembly from the 68th district
- Incumbent
- Assumed office December 5, 2022
- Preceded by: Steven Choi (redistricted)
- Succeeded by: Jessie Lopez (elect)

Member of the Anaheim City Council for the 4th district
- In office December 8, 2020 – December 5, 2022
- Preceded by: Lucille Kring
- Succeeded by: Norma Campos Kurtz

Personal details
- Born: November 12, 1988 (age 38) Anaheim, California
- Party: Democratic
- Education: Fullerton College (A.S.); San Jose State University (B.A.); Johns Hopkins University (MPA)
- Profession: Politician

Avelino Valencia (born November 12, 1988) is an American Democratic politician who is currently serving as a member of the California State Assembly for the 68th district since 2022. Previously, he was a member of the Anaheim City Council.

== Early life and career ==
Valencia was born on November 12, 1988, in Anaheim, California, to parents of Mexican descent. He attended Katella High School, Fullerton College, San Jose State University, and Johns Hopkins University.

Playing for the 2009 San Jose State Spartans football team, he made a single reception for seven yards.

He worked for Assemblyman Tom Daly as a political staffer from 2016 to 2022.

== Political career ==
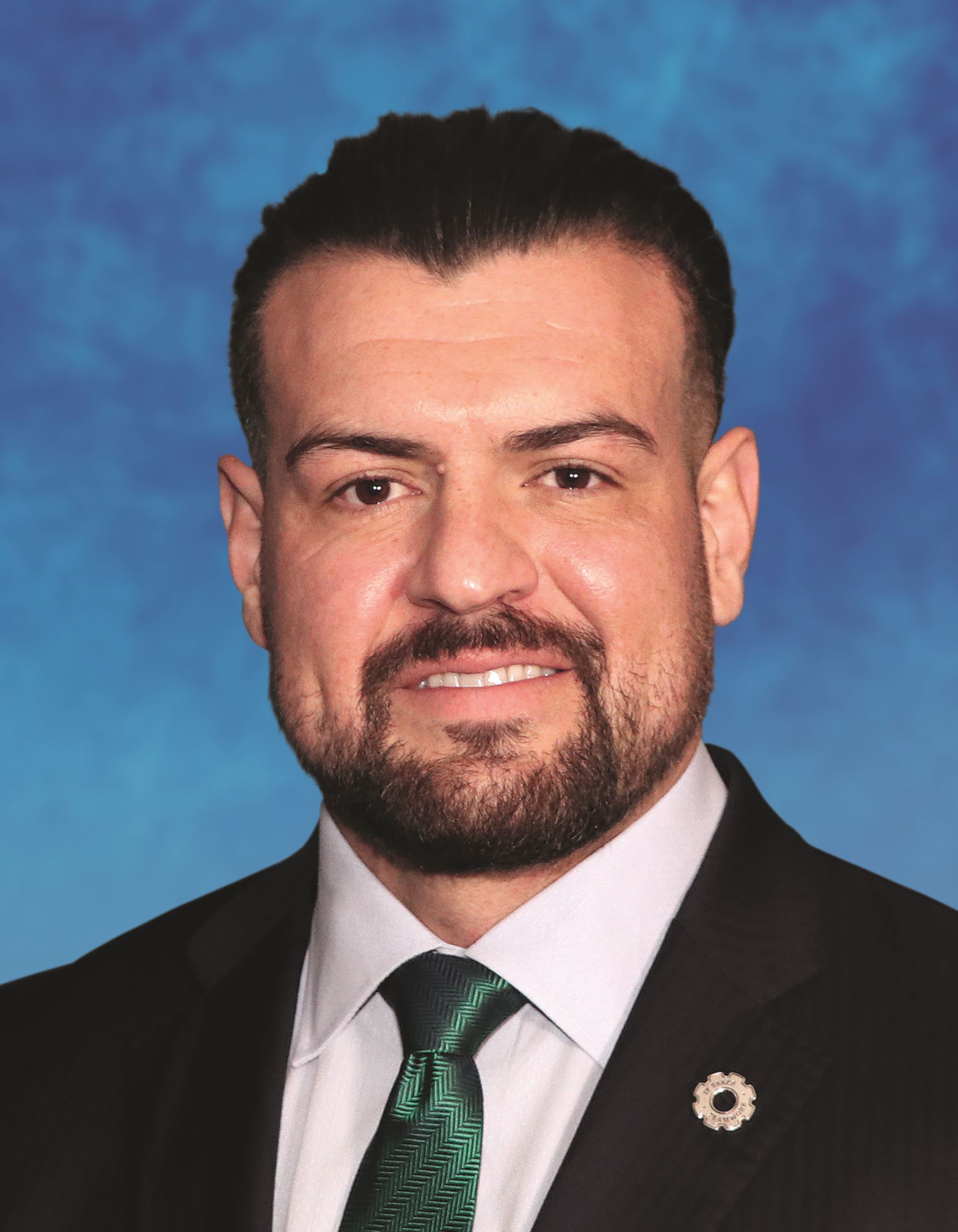
Avelino Valencia on the Anaheim city Council

In 2020, Valencia ran for Anaheim City Council to replace the termed-out Lucille King, winning the election against Anaheim Union High School District Board of Trustee President Annemarie Randle-Trejo and activist Jeannine Robbins.

In 2022, California State Assembly member Tom Daly announced his retirement and the district was redistricted, leaving no incumbent in the 2022 election. Valencia announced his campaign for Assembly against three other politicians. In the primary, he and Republican Mike Tardif advanced to the general election, where Valencia led Tardif in the votes and was elected as a member of the Assembly.

In December 2024, Valencia announced that in 2026 he will run for the California State Senate to replace termed out Senator Tom Umberg.

== Electoral history ==
2020 Anaheim City Council 4th district election
| Candidate | Votes | % |
|---|---|---|
| Avelino Valencia | 7,861 | 50.62 |
| Annemarie Randle-Trejo | 3,541 | 22.80 |
| Jeanine A. Robbins | 3,349 | 21.56 |
| Julie Brunette | 779 | 5.02 |
| Total votes | 15,530 | 100.0 |

2022 California State Assembly 68th district election
Primary election
| Party | Candidate | Votes | % |
|---|---|---|---|
| Democratic | Avelino Valencia | 22,635 | 48.3 |
| Republican | Mike Tardif | 11,034 | 23.5 |
| Democratic | Bulmaro Vicente | 7,029 | 15.0 |
| Republican | James Wallace | 6,189 | 13.2 |
| Total votes | | 46,887 | 100.0 |
General election
| Democratic | Avelino Valencia | 49,385 | 62.3 |
| Republican | Mike Tardif | 29,910 | 37.7 |
| Total votes | | 79,295 | 100.0 |
| Democratic hold | | | |

2024 California State Assembly 68th district election
Primary election
| Party | Candidate | Votes | % |
|---|---|---|---|
| Democratic | Avelino Valencia (incumbent) | 28,985 | 58.8 |
| Republican | Mike Tardif | 20,320 | 41.2 |
| Total votes | | 49,305 | 100.0 |
General election
| Democratic | Avelino Valencia (incumbent) | 84,259 | 63.7 |
| Republican | Mike Tardif | 47,975 | 36.3 |
| Total votes | | 132,234 | 100.0 |
| Democratic hold | | | |
