= Edgar Campbell =

Edgar Campbell may refer to:

- Edgar C. Campbell Sr. (1902–1987), Philadelphia city councilmember
- Edgar O. Campbell (1867–1947), California state legislator
