= Reggie Jones-Sawyer =

American politician (born 1957)

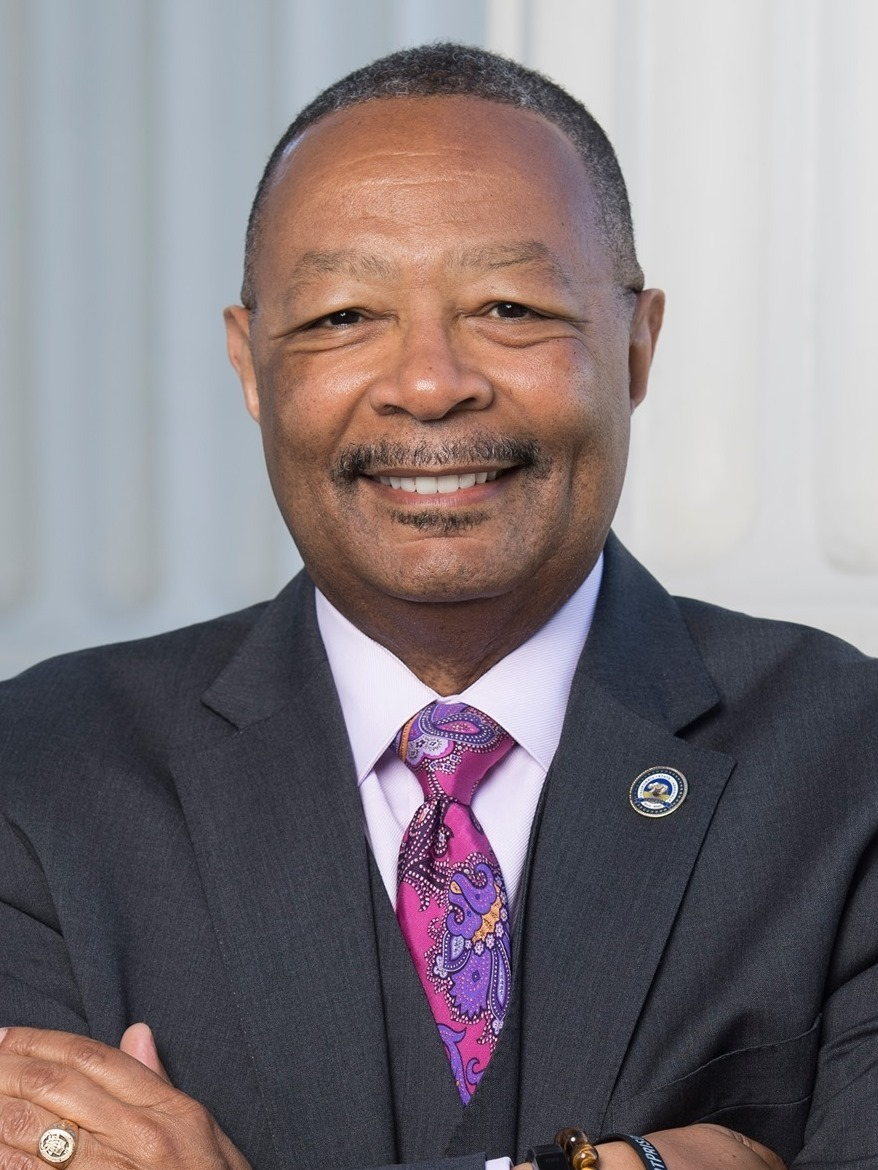
- Official portrait, 2020

Member of the California State Assembly
- In office December 3, 2012 – November 20, 2024
- Preceded by: Tim Donnelly (redistricted)
- Succeeded by: Sade Elhawary
- Constituency: 59th district (2012–2022); 57th district (2022–2024)

Personal details
- Born: January 14, 1957 (age 69) Little Rock, Arkansas, U.S.
- Party: Democratic
- Children: 3
- Relatives: Jefferson Thomas (uncle)
- Education: University of Southern California (BS)
- Profession: Labor organizer

Reginald Byron Jones-Sawyer Sr. (born January 14, 1957) is an American politician who served in the California State Assembly from 2012 to 2024. Representing the 59th district from 2012 to 2022 and the 57th district from 2022 to 2024, Jones-Sawyer was a member of the California Legislative Black Caucus and served as chair of the caucus from 2015 to 2016. In 2023, he announced his candidacy for the Los Angeles City Council for the 2024 Los Angeles elections, in which he placed 5th out of five candidates in the primary.

== Early life and education ==
Jones-Sawyer was born in Little Rock, Arkansas on January 14, 1957. His uncle, Jefferson Thomas, was one of the "Little Rock Nine" high school students. He attended and graduated from the University of Southern California, earning a Bachelor of Science degree in Public Administration.

== Political career ==
Prior to his election to the California State Assembly, Jones-Sawyer worked for the City of Los Angeles, including as Director of Asset Management and Assistant Deputy Mayor. He also served as the Secretary of the California Democratic Party, Chair of the Baldwin Hills Conservancy, Chair of the Los Angeles County Small Business Commission, and Vice President for SEIU's Local 721 within the Los Angeles Professional Managers Association.

Jones-Sawyer was elected to the State Assembly in 2012, being re-elected five more times until 2022; he was twice re-elected without any opposition. In 2014, he was fined for campaign violations, admitting that he accepted campaign contributions from a friend that was over the limit of contributions. In 2021, Jones-Sawyer sought to change the statewide entry requirements for police officers with AB89, which would've required at least a bachelor's degree or at least 25 years of age before entering a police academy.

In 2023, Jones-Sawyer announced that he would be challenging appointed incumbent councilor Heather Hutt in the 2024 Los Angeles elections. He was eliminated in the primary.

In 2023, Jones-Sawyer committee chair of Public Safety Committee, disapproved of Senate Bill 14, a bill that would include sex trafficking of a minor in the lists of crimes that are defined as serious under California law, making the crime a strike under the Three Strikes law. Jones-Sawyer said it would disproportionately affect “Black and Brown Communities.” Proponents of the bipartisan bill argued that over 70% of trafficked women in shelters are black and over 50% of children trafficked are black i.e. Figueroa St. Los Angeles. Jones-Sawyer argued, “there is no evidence that if you lock someone up for long periods of time, it helps them”. However, proponents of SB14 argued this is to protect victims and prevent repeat perpetrators from further trafficking.

Jones-Sawyer is a member of the California Legislative Progressive Caucus.

== Electoral history ==
Electoral history of Reggie Jones-Sawyer
| Year | Office | Party | Primary | | | General | | | Result | Swing |
| Year | Office | Party | Total | % | P. | Total | % | P. | Result | Swing |
|---|---|---|---|---|---|---|---|---|---|---|
| 2012 | State Assembly | Democratic | 7,029 | 43.6% | 1st | 36,949 | 52.3% | 1st | Won | Hold |
| 2014 | State Assembly | Democratic | 12,404 | 100.00% | 1st | 28,493 | 100.00% | 1st | Won | Hold |
| 2016 | State Assembly | Democratic | 35,820 | 100.00% | 1st | 77,325 | 100.00% | 1st | Won | Hold |
| 2018 | State Assembly | Democratic | 19,188 | 76.8% | 1st | 47,765 | 66.9% | 1st | Won | Hold |
| 2020 | State Assembly | Democratic | 19,873 | 44.9% | 2nd | 63,448 | 57.5% | 1st | Won | Hold |
| 2024 | City Council | Nonpartisan | 2,102 | 5.92% | 5th | Did not advance | | | Lost | N/A |
