= Jessie Lopez (politician) =

American politician

- Lopez in 2022

Member-elect of the California State Assembly from the 68th district
- Assuming office December 7, 2026
- Succeeding: Avelino Valencia

Personal details
- Born: Santa Ana, California
- Party: Democratic
- Other political affiliations: Working Families Party; Democratic Socialists of America (Note: The Democratic Socialists of America (DSA) are not a registered political party. Instead, they are a political organization for those with democratic socialist ideologies.)
- Education: Santa Ana College (A.A.), California State University, Long Beach (B.A)
- Website: https://www.votejessielopez.com/

Jessie Lopez is an American politician. A member of the Democratic Party, she is the member-elect for the 68th district of the California State Assembly. She is currently a member of the Santa Ana City Council.
