= Tom Tait =

American politician

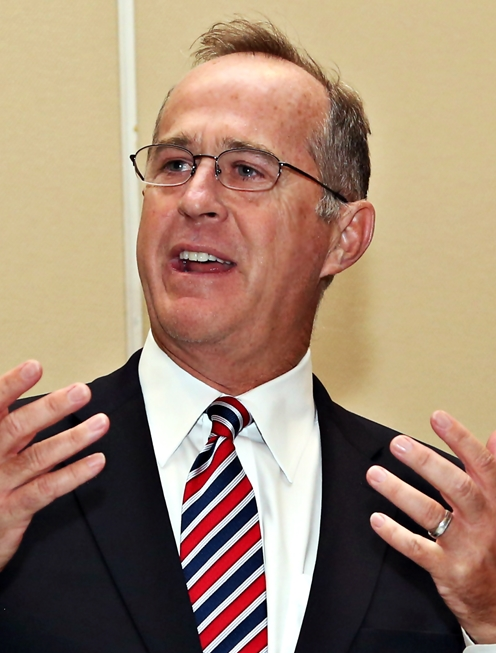

45th Mayor of Anaheim
- In office December 8, 2010 – December 4, 2018
- Preceded by: Curt Pringle
- Succeeded by: Harry Sidhu

Member of the Anaheim City Council for the At Large district
- In office February 7, 1995 – December 7, 2004
- Preceded by: Tom Daly
- Succeeded by: Harry Sidhu

Personal details
- Born: October 18, 1958 (age 67)
- Party: Republican
- Spouse: Julie
- Children: 4
- Education: University of Wyoming (BS); Vanderbilt University (JD, MBA)

Tom Tait (born October 18, 1958) is an American politician and businessman who was the 45th mayor of Anaheim, California from 2010 to 2018. He previously served on the Anaheim City Council beginning in 1995 to 2004 and served as Mayor Pro Tem from 2002 to 2003.

Tait was born in California and attended the University of Wyoming where he received his Bachelor of Science degree and then went on to earn a master's degree in Business Administration from Vanderbilt University with a Finance concentration, followed by a receiving a Juris Doctor degree from Vanderbilt in 1985. Tait is a member of the California State Bar, and is president of Tait & Associates, Inc. as well as Tait Environmental Services. Tait and his wife, Julie, have four children and the pair has resided in Anaheim for 22 years. Tait was a member of Toastmasters.

== Electoral history ==
=== Mayor ===
2010 Anaheim mayoral election
Candidate	Votes	%
Tom Tait	33,340	54.4
Shirley McCracken	19,668	32.1
Denis Fitzgerald	8,229	13.4

2014 Anaheim mayoral election
Candidate	Votes	%
Tom Tait	24,116	53.4
Lori Galloway	9,235	20.4
Licille Kring	8,757	19.4
Denis Fitzgerald	3,090	6.8

Political offices
Preceded by Curt Pringle	Mayor of Anaheim; 2010-2018	Succeeded by Harry Sidhu
