= Anthony Adams (California politician) =

American politician

Member of the California State Assembly from the 59th district
- In office December 4, 2006 - November 30, 2010
- Preceded by: Dennis Mountjoy
- Succeeded by: Tim Donnelly

Personal details
- Born: February 27, 1971 (age 55) Los Angeles, California, US
- Party: Republican
- Spouse: Deanna
- Education: California State University, San Bernardino; Western State University College of Law

Anthony Adams (born February 27, 1971, in Los Angeles, California) is a former California State Assemblyman who represented the 59th district from 2006 to 2010. He re-registered from Republican to No Party Preference (previously known as Decline To State) in 2012.

Receiving his bachelor's degree in political science from California State University, San Bernardino and his law degree from Western State University College of Law in Fullerton, Adams passed the California Bar exam in July 2010.

Adams was the director of legislative affairs for San Bernardino County prior to his election to the State Assembly. He served as a member of the Hesperia Public Safety Commission. He hosted a local weekly radio broadcast on KIXW (AM Talk 960). The California State Firefighters Association and the San Bernardino County Board of Education have both named Assemblyman Adams as Legislator of the Year.

Adams was one of only six Republican legislators to approve the 2009 budget, which included tax increases despite having previously signed an anti-tax pledge. Adams chose not to run for re-election in 2010, and was appointed by Governor Arnold Schwarzenegger to a post on the state parole board in December 2010 instead.

Adams ran for Congress in California's 8th District in 2012, and came in 9th place in the primary with 3.3% of the vote He and his wife Deanna have resided in Hesperia, California, since 1996.

Adams is currently working in Northern California (Ukiah) as a Deputy Public Defender for Mendocino County, as of September 2014.
