= California's 59th State Assembly district =

American legislative district

Current assemblymember
Phillip Chen; R–Yorba Linda
- Population (2010) • Voting age • Citizen voting age: 465,168; 319,044; 168,548
- Demographics: 2.60% White; 19.38% Black; 75.00% Latino; 2.05% Asian; 0.13% Native American; 0.04% Hawaiian/Pacific Islander; 0.36% other; 0.43% remainder of multiracial
- Registered voters: 193,106
- Registration: 66.83% Democratic; 5.04% Republican; 24.16% No party preference

California's 59th State Assembly district is one of 80 California State Assembly districts. It is currently represented by Republican Phillip Chen of Yorba Linda.

== District profile ==
The district encompasses most of the more Republican leaning areas in northeast Orange County along the Inland Empire border, taking in the entirety of suburban cities such as Yorba Linda, Brea, Placentia, Anaheim Hills, Villa Park, North Tustin, and portions of Orange and Fullerton. It also encompasses the suburban San Bernardino county city of Chino Hills and a small portion of Chino.

== Election results from statewide races ==
Year	Office	Results
2021	Recall	No 87.5 – 12.5%
2020	President	Biden 84.6 – 11.8%
2018	Governor	Newsom 88.6 – 11.4%
2018	Senator	Feinstein 58.9 – 41.1%
2016	President	Clinton 90.1 – 5.1%
2016	Senator	Harris 54.2 – 45.8%
2014	Governor	Brown 90.9 – 9.1%
2012	President	Obama 93.2 – 6.2%
2012	Senator	Feinstein 91.8 – 8.2%

== List of assembly members representing the district ==
Due to redistricting, the 59th district has been moved around different parts of the state. The current iteration resulted from the 2021 redistricting by the California Citizens Redistricting Commission.

Assembly members	Party	Years served	Counties represented	Notes
Flavel Joseph Woodward	Republican	January 5, 1885 – January 3, 1887	San Joaquin	
James Riley Henry	Democratic	January 3, 1887 – January 7, 1889	San Joaquin	
John McMullin	Democratic	January 7, 1889 – January 5, 1891	San Joaquin	
John Lyman Beecher Jr.	Republican	January 5, 1891 – January 2, 1893	San Joaquin	
John H. Matthews	Democratic	January 2, 1893 – January 7, 1895	San Benito	
Charles G. Cargill	Republican	January 7, 1895 – January 4, 1897	San Benito	
Claudius Frazier Rubell	Democratic	January 4, 1897 – January 2, 1899	San Benito	
Charles G. Cargill	Republican	January 2, 1899 – June 18, 1900	San Benito	Died in office from pneumonia.
Vacant		June 18, 1900 – January 1, 1901	San Benito	
William Higby	Republican	January 1, 1901 – January 5, 1903	San Benito	
Montague B. Steadman	Republican	January 5, 1903 – January 2, 1905	Monterey	
J. B. R. Cooper	Republican	January 2, 1905 – January 7, 1907	Monterey	
John Jay Wyatt	Republican	January 7, 1907 – January 2, 1911	Monterey	
Charles B. Rosendale	Democratic	January 2, 1911 – January 6, 1913	Monterey	
Henry C. Bagby	Democratic	January 6, 1913 – January 4, 1915	Santa Barbara	
Ira E. Kramer	Progressive	January 4, 1915 – January 8, 1917	Santa Barbara	
Theodore Randolph Finley, Sr.	Democratic	January 8, 1917 – January 6, 1919	Santa Barbara	
William C. Oakley	Democratic	January 6, 1919 – January 3, 1921	Santa Barbara	
Oscar W. Smith	Republican	January 3, 1921 – January 8, 1923	Santa Barbara	
Edgar W. Stow	Republican	January 8, 1923 – January 5, 1925	Santa Barbara	
Edgar O. Campbell	Republican	January 5, 1925 – January 3, 1927	Santa Barbara	
Theodore Randolph Finley, Sr.	Democratic	January 3, 1927 – June 1, 1927	Santa Barbara	Resigned to become Mayor of Santa Barbara.
Vacant		June 1, 1927 – January 7, 1929	Santa Barbara	
George R. Bliss	Republican	January 7, 1929 – January 5, 1931	Santa Barbara	
Willard E. Badham	Republican	January 5, 1931 – January 2, 1933	Los Angeles	
Charles W. Lyon	Republican	January 2, 1933 – January 6, 1947	Los Angeles	
Willard M. Huyck	Republican	January 6, 1947 – January 8, 1951	Los Angeles	
Charles W. Lyon	Republican	January 8, 1951 – January 3, 1955	Los Angeles	
Thomas M. Rees	Democratic	January 3, 1955 – January 7, 1963	Los Angeles	
Anthony Beilenson	Democratic	January 7, 1963 – January 2, 1967	Los Angeles	
Alan Sieroty	Democratic	January 2, 1967 – November 30, 1974	Los Angeles	
Jack R. Fenton	Democratic	December 2, 1974 – November 30, 1980	Los Angeles	
Matthew G. Martínez	Democratic	December 1, 1980 – July 15, 1982	Los Angeles	Resigned from office after winning a congressional seat.
Vacant		July 15, 1982 – December 6, 1982	Los Angeles	
Charles Calderon	Democratic	December 6, 1982 – April 16, 1990	Los Angeles	Resigned to be sworn in the 26th State Senate district after winning special election.
Vacant		April 16, 1990 – December 3, 1990	Los Angeles	
Xavier Becerra	Democratic	December 3, 1990 – November 30, 1992	Los Angeles	
Dick Mountjoy	Republican	December 7, 1992 – January 23, 1995	Los Angeles	Removed from office after a majority of the membership of the California State Assembly determined that he was not duly elected and qualified to be an Assemblymember.
Vacant		January 23, 1995 – June 7, 1995	Los Angeles	
Bob Margett	Republican	June 7, 1995 – November 30, 2000	Los Angeles	Sworn in after winning special election.
Dennis Mountjoy	Republican	December 4, 2000 – November 30, 2006	Los Angeles	
Dennis Mountjoy	Republican	December 4, 2000 – November 30, 2006	Los Angeles, San Bernardino	
Anthony Adams	Republican	December 4, 2006 – November 30, 2010	Los Angeles, San Bernardino	
Tim Donnelly	Republican	December 6, 2010 – November 30, 2012	Los Angeles, San Bernardino	
Reggie Jones-Sawyer	Democratic	December 6, 2012 – November 30, 2022	Los Angeles	
Phillip Chen	Republican	December 5, 2022 – present	Orange, San Bernandino	

== Election results (1990–present) ==
=== 2024 ===
2024 California State Assembly 59th district election
Primary election
Party	Candidate	Votes	%
Republican	Phillip Chen (incumbent)	75,179	63.8
Democratic	Dave Obrand	42,719	36.2
Total votes		117,898	100.0
General election
Republican	Phillip Chen (incumbent)	139,133	60.5
Democratic	Dave Obrand	90,834	39.5
Total votes		229,947	100.0
Republican hold			

=== 2022 ===
2022 California State Assembly 59th district election
Primary election
Party	Candidate	Votes	%
Republican	Phillip Chen (incumbent)	75,555	99.2
No party preference	Leon Sit (write-in)	551	0.7
Libertarian	David Naranjo (write-in)	58	0.1
Total votes		76,164	100.0
General election
Republican	Phillip Chen (incumbent)	113,363	70.0
No party preference	Leon Sit	48,602	30.0
Total votes		161,965	100.0
Republican gain from Democratic			

=== 2020 ===
2020 California State Assembly 59th district election
Primary election
Party	Candidate	Votes	%
Democratic	Efren Martinez	22,416	50.6
Democratic	Reggie Jones-Sawyer (incumbent)	19,873	44.9
Democratic	Marcello Villeda	1,999	4.5
Total votes		44,288	100.0
General election
Democratic	Reggie Jones-Sawyer (incumbent)	63,448	57.5
Democratic	Efren Martinez	46,853	42.5
Total votes		110,301	100.0
Democratic hold			

=== 2018 ===
2018 California State Assembly 59th district election
Primary election
Party	Candidate	Votes	%
Democratic	Reggie Jones-Sawyer (incumbent)	19,188	76.8
Democratic	Leslie Hagan-Morgan	5,797	23.2
Total votes		24,985	100.0
General election
Democratic	Reggie Jones-Sawyer (incumbent)	47,765	66.9
Democratic	Leslie Hagan-Morgan	23,653	33.1
Total votes		71,418	100.0
Democratic hold			

=== 2016 ===
2016 California State Assembly 59th district election
Primary election
Party	Candidate	Votes	%
Democratic	Reggie Jones-Sawyer (incumbent)	35,820	100.0
Total votes		35,820	100.0
General election
Democratic	Reggie Jones-Sawyer (incumbent)	77,324	100.0
Total votes		77,324	100.0
Democratic hold			

=== 2014 ===
2014 California State Assembly 59th district election
Primary election
Party	Candidate	Votes	%
Democratic	Reggie Jones-Sawyer (incumbent)	12,404	100.0
Total votes		12,404	100.0
General election
Democratic	Reggie Jones-Sawyer (incumbent)	28,493	100.0
Total votes		28,493	100.0
Democratic hold			

=== 2012 ===
2012 California State Assembly 59th district election
Primary election
Party	Candidate	Votes	%
Democratic	Reggie Jones-Sawyer	7,029	43.6
Democratic	Rodney D. Robinson	3,038	18.8
Democratic	Greg Akili	2,772	17.2
Democratic	Gertrude "Trudy" Holmes-Magee	2,487	15.4
Democratic	Armenak H. Nouridjanian	810	5.0
Total votes		16,136	100.0
General election
Democratic	Reggie Jones-Sawyer	40,519	52.3
Democratic	Rodney D. Robinson	36,949	47.7
Total votes		77,468	100.0
Democratic gain from Republican			

=== 2010 ===
2010 California State Assembly 59th district election
Party	Candidate	Votes	%
Republican	Tim Donnelly	82,475	57.3
Democratic	Darcel Woods	52,928	36.8
Libertarian	Tony Tyler	4,335	3.0
American Independent	Robert Gosney	4,269	2.9
Total votes		144,007	100.0
Republican hold			

=== 2008 ===
2008 California State Assembly 59th district election
Party	Candidate	Votes	%
Republican	Anthony Adams (incumbent)	91,366	51.0
Democratic	Donald Williamson	73,011	40.8
Libertarian	Maureen Keedy	14,744	8.2
Total votes		179,121	100.0
Republican hold			

=== 2006 ===
2006 California State Assembly 59th district election
Party	Candidate	Votes	%
Republican	Anthony Adams	67,499	55.8
Democratic	Elliott Barkan	45,655	37.7
Libertarian	Jill Stone	7,845	6.5
Total votes		120,999	100.0
Republican hold			

=== 2004 ===
2004 California State Assembly 59th district election
Party	Candidate	Votes	%
Republican	Dennis L. Mountjoy (incumbent)	99,381	58.2
Democratic	Dan Harden	64,375	37.7
Libertarian	Fritz R. Ward	6,937	4.1
Total votes		170,693	100.0
Republican hold			

=== 2002 ===
2002 California State Assembly 59th district election
Party	Candidate	Votes	%
Republican	Dennis L. Mountjoy (incumbent)	65,439	63.4
Democratic	Patrick D. Smith	37,788	36.6
Total votes		103,227	100.0
Republican hold			

=== 2000 ===
2000 California State Assembly 59th district election
Party	Candidate	Votes	%
Republican	Dennis L. Mountjoy	67,036	48.3
Democratic	Meline Dolores Hall	60,013	43.2
Libertarian	George White	6,359	4.6
Natural Law	Louis M. Allison	5,390	3.9
Total votes		138,798	100.0
Republican hold			

=== 1998 ===
1998 California State Assembly 59th district election
Party	Candidate	Votes	%
Republican	Bob Margett (incumbent)	58,339	54.7
Democratic	Christian P. Christiansen	44,133	41.4
Natural Law	Louise M. Allison	2,269	2.1
Libertarian	Jerry Johnson	1,855	1.7
Total votes		106,596	100.0
Republican hold			

=== 1996 ===
1996 California State Assembly 59th district election
Party	Candidate	Votes	%
Republican	Bob Margett (incumbent)	72,438	58.4
Democratic	Brent A. Decker	51,551	41.6
Total votes		123,989	100.0
Republican hold			

=== 1995 (special) ===
1995 California State Assembly 59th district special election Vacancy resulting from the resignation of Dick Mountjoy
Party	Candidate	Votes	%
Republican	Bob Margett	21,726	71.7
Democratic	Brent A. Decker	8,592	28.3
Total votes		30,318	100.0
Republican hold			

=== 1994 ===
1994 California State Assembly 59th district election
Party	Candidate	Votes	%
Republican	Dick Mountjoy (incumbent)	74,126	65.2
Democratic	Margalo Ashley-Farrand	39,489	34.7
No party	Gary V. Miller (write-in)	45	0.0
Total votes		113,660	100.0
Republican hold			

=== 1992 ===
1992 California State Assembly 59th district election
Party	Candidate	Votes	%
Republican	Dick Mountjoy (incumbent)	79,846	55.5
Democratic	Louise Gelber	64,091	44.5
Total votes		143,937	100.0
Republican gain from Democratic			

=== 1990 ===
1990 California State Assembly 59th district election
Party	Candidate	Votes	%
Democratic	Xavier Becerra	34,650	60.9
Republican	Leland Lieberg	19,938	35.0
Libertarian	Steven Pencall	2,331	4.1
Total votes		56,919	100.0
Democratic hold			

== See also ==
- California State Assembly
- California State Assembly districts
- Districts in California
