= Harry Sidhu =

American politician (born 1957)

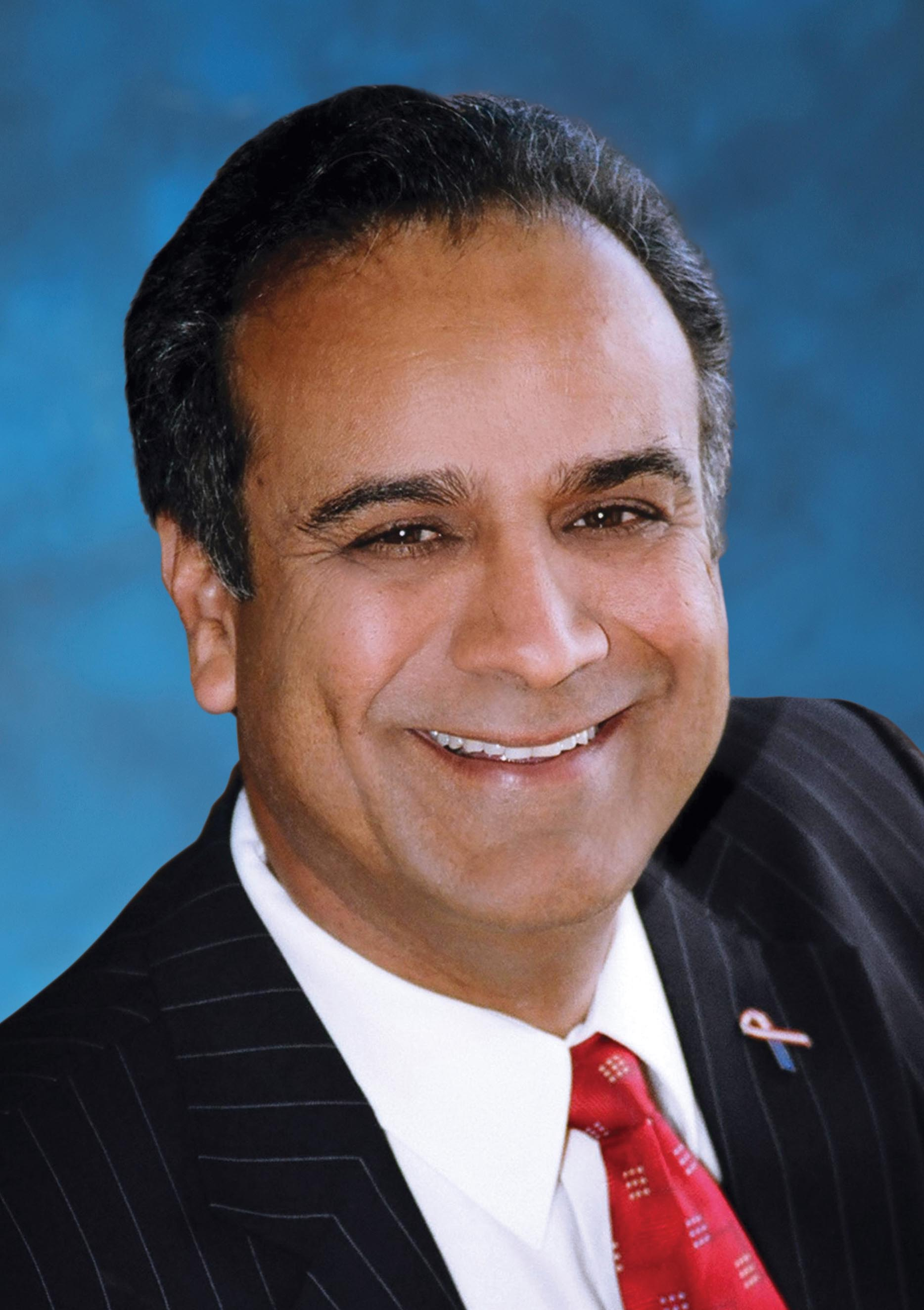

46th Mayor of Anaheim
- In office December 4, 2018 – May 24, 2022
- Preceded by: Tom Tait
- Succeeded by: Ashleigh Aitken

Mayor pro tempore of Anaheim
- In office January 12, 2010 – December 11, 2012
- Mayor: Curt Pringle; Tom Tait
- Preceded by: Bob Hernandez
- Succeeded by: Gail E. Eastman

Member of the Anaheim City Council for the At Large district
- In office December 7, 2004 – December 11, 2012
- Preceded by: Tom Tait
- Succeeded by: Lucille Kring

Personal details
- Born: Harish Singh Sidhu; July 8, 1957 (age 68) India
- Political party: Republican
- Spouse: Gin Sidhu
- Children: 2
- Education: Drexel University (BS)
- Website: Official website Campaign website

Harish Singh "Harry" Sidhu (born July 8, 1957) is an American Republican politician and businessman who served as the 46th mayor of Anaheim, California from 2018 to 2022 after winning the office in the 2018 election. He was the first person of color and the first Sikh to serve as mayor of Anaheim. He was a member of the Anaheim City Council from 2004 to 2012 and was mayor pro tempore of Anaheim from 2010 to 2012.

Sidhu resigned as Mayor effective May 24, 2022, in the midst of an FBI investigation for possible corruption involving the sale of Angel Stadium. In August 2023, he pleaded guilty to obstruction of justice for deleting four emails, wire fraud, and making false statements to the FAA and the FBI. In March 2025, he was sentenced to two months in prison and fined $55,000.

== Education and early career ==
Sidhu earned a degree in mechanical engineering from Drexel University. He became a U.S. citizen in 1979 and worked as a consulting engineer.

Sidhu served as director of the Orange County Water District Board. He also serves on the board of Friends of United States, an organization that promotes India–United States relations.

== Mayoral career ==
=== Resignation ===
On May 16, 2022, a filing at the Orange County Superior Court stated that Sidhu was under investigation by the FBI for actions related to the sale of Angel Stadium and registering a personal helicopter at a false out-of-state address. On August 16, 2023, Sidhu agreed to plead guilty to obstruction of justice (for "deleting multiple email messages and documents"), wire fraud, and making false statements to the FAA and the FBI. He admitted to attempting to evade sales tax on the helicopter, providing confidential information to the Angels, and hoping to receive $1 million in independent expenditures from the team if they bought Angel Stadium.

== Electoral history ==
=== City Council ===
2004 Anaheim City Council at-large election (2 seats)
Candidate	Votes	%
Lorri Galloway	24,856	18.8
Harry Sidhu	24,242	18.4
Jerry O'Connnell	19,044	14.4
Lucile Kring	15,819	12.0
Sefanie O'Neill	10,451	7.9
Richard "Dick" Larochelle	10,421	7.9
Andrea James	8,152	6.2
George Charles Johnson	7,243	5.5
Robert J. Flores	5,068	3.8
John R. Karczynski	2,206	1.7
Rubin Jamison Skipper	1,807	1.4
Craig Merrihue	1,496	1.1
Faiz Zuberi	1,137	0.9

2008 Anaheim City Council at-large election (2 seats)
Candidate	Votes	%
Harry Sidhu (incumbent)	32,652	23.2
Lorri Galloway (incumbent)	31,694	22.6
Gail Eastman	27,200	19.4
John Karczynski	11,668	8.3
Kostas "Gus" Roditis	10,160	7.2
Jennifer Rivera	8,208	5.8
Robert J. Flores	7,148	5.1
Steve Perez	5,495	3.9
Brian Chuchua	4,957	3.5
Faiz Zuberi	1,336	1.0

=== State Assembly ===
California's 68th State Assembly district election, 2016
Primary election
Party	Candidate	Votes	%
Democratic	Sean Jay Panahi	32,610	33.0
Republican	Steven Choi	19,559	19.8
Republican	Harry Sidhu	19,405	19.7
Republican	Deborah Pauly	13,880	14.1
Republican	Alexia Deligianni-Brydges	5,098	5.2
No party preference	Brian Chuchua	4,635	4.7
Republican	Kostas Roditis	3,528	3.6
Total votes		98,715	100.0
General election
Republican	Steven Choi	114,210	60.3
Democratic	Sean Jay Panahi	75,231	39.7
Total votes		189,441	100.0
Republican hold			

=== Mayor ===
2018 Anaheim mayoral election
Candidate	Votes	%
Harry Sidhu	26,422	32.5%
Ashleigh Aitken	25,944	31.9%
Lorri Galloway	12,367	15.2%
Cynthia Ward	7,121	8.7%
H. Fuji Shioura	3,024	3.7%
Robert Williams	2,824	3.5%
Rudy Gaona	2,506	3.1%
Tony D. Martin	1,199	1.5%
Total votes	81,407	100%

== Personal life ==
Sidhu is of Punjabi descent. He emigrated from India.

Political offices
Preceded by Tom Tait	Mayor of Anaheim; 2018–2022	Succeeded by Ashleigh Aitken
