= 1998 California State Treasurer election =

- November 3, 1998
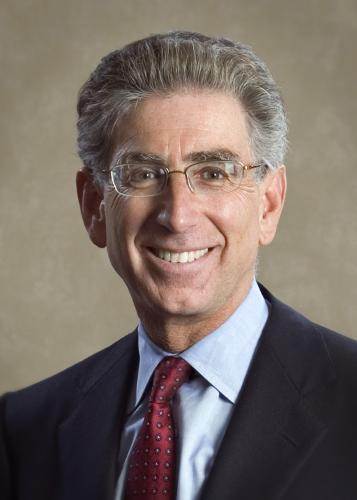

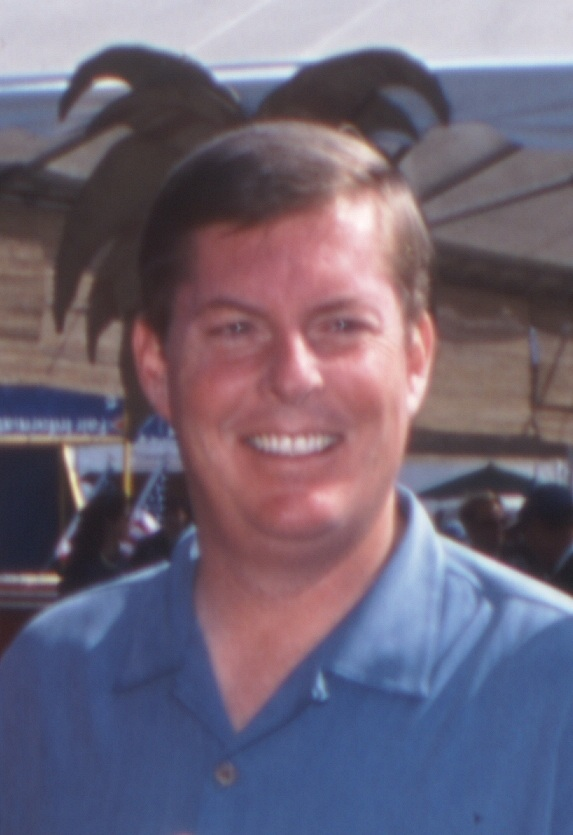
Nominee	Phil Angelides	Curt Pringle
Party	Democratic	Republican
Popular vote	4,166,206	3,159,898
Percentage	52.60%	39.90%
- County results Angelides: 40–50% 50–60% 60–70% 70–80% Pringle: 40–50% 50–60%
Treasurer before election
Matt Fong
Republican
Elected Treasurer
Phil Angelides
Democratic

The 1998 California State Treasurer election occurred on November 3, 1998. The primary elections took place on June 3, 1998. The Democratic nominee, Phil Angelides, handily defeated the Republican nominee, State Assemblyman Curt Pringle, for the office previously held by incumbent Matt Fong, who chose not to seek re-election in favor of running for Senate.

== Primary results ==
Final results from Secretary of State of California.

=== Democratic ===
==== Candidates ====
Phil Angelides, Former Chairman of the California Democratic Party

Albert Robles

Mervin Evans

California State Treasurer Democratic primary, 1998
Candidate	Votes	%
Phil Angelides	1,374,917	53.10
Albert Robles	948,122	36.62
Mervin Evans	266,203	10.28
Total votes	2,589,242	100.00

=== Republican ===
==== Candidates ====
Curt Pringle, Assemblyman and Former Speaker of California State Assembly

Jan Goldsmith

California State Treasurer Republican primary, 1998
Candidate	Votes	%
Curt Pringle	1,506,892	62.20
Jan Goldsmith	915,787	37.80
Total votes	2,422,679	100.00

=== Others ===
California State Treasurer primary, 1998 (Others)
Party	Candidate	Votes	%
Libertarian	Jon Petersen	128,124	100.00
Peace and Freedom	Jan B. Tucker	98,891	100.00
Natural Law	Carlos Aguirre	93,377	100.00
American Independent	Edmon V. Kaiser	54,431	100.00

== General election results ==
Final results from the Secretary of State of California.

1998 Secretary of State election, California
Party	Candidate	Votes	%
Democratic	Phil Angelides	4,166,206	52.60
Republican	Curt Pringle	3,159,898	39.90
Libertarian	John Petersen	183,436	2.32
Natural Law	Carlos Aguirre	172,844	2.18
Peace and Freedom	Jan B. Tucker	146,226	1.85
American Independent	Edmon V. Kaiser	91,801	1.16
Invalid or blank votes		427,354	4.96
Total votes		7,920,411	100.00
Turnout			41.32
Democratic gain from Republican			

=== Results by county ===
Final results from the Secretary of State of California.

County	Angelides	Votes	Pringle	Votes	Petersen	Votes	Aguirre	Votes	Others	Votes
San Francisco	72.39%	154,351	19.00%	40,507	2.48%	5,281	2.17%	4,617	3.96%	8,451
Alameda	67.81%	243,238	24.37%	87,393	2.13%	7,654	1.87%	6,710	3.81%	13,684
Marin	61.26%	58,145	32.28%	30,643	2.56%	2,428	1.21%	1,151	2.69%	2,555
Los Angeles	60.84%	1,140,657	32.35%	606,568	1.92%	36,009	2.45%	45,852	2.45%	45,907
San Mateo	60.53%	116,819	32.38%	62,478	2.31%	4,467	1.89%	3,645	2.89%	5,571
Santa Cruz	60.41%	48,443	28.50%	22,860	3.95%	3,170	2.14%	1,720	5.00%	4,004
Yolo	59.45%	28,990	33.73%	16,449	2.14%	1,044	1.91%	929	2.77%	1,349
Sonoma	58.97%	88,758	31.83%	47,911	2.93%	4,414	1.74%	2,615	4.52%	6,804
Solano	58.68%	57,230	34.51%	33,657	2.01%	1,960	1.78%	1,740	3.01%	2,940
Santa Clara	57.79%	226,786	34.49%	135,351	3.01%	11,809	1.93%	7,577	2.78%	10,925
Contra Costa	56.16%	157,804	36.91%	103,733	2.40%	6,740	1.69%	4,763	2.84%	7,973
Lake	55.37%	9,992	36.95%	6,668	2.45%	442	1.40%	253	3.82%	690
Mendocino	54.39%	14,701	32.88%	8,888	3.84%	1,039	1.93%	523	6.95%	1,880
Sacramento	53.47%	186,404	40.13%	139,903	2.00%	6,983	1.61%	5,620	2.78%	9,691
Monterey	53.01%	46,022	38.74%	33,631	2.52%	2,191	2.62%	2,277	3.11%	2,701
Napa	52.95%	21,499	39.50%	16,037	2.30%	935	1.79%	727	3.47%	1,407
Merced	50.97%	19,464	41.69%	15,920	1.59%	609	2.96%	1,130	2.78%	1,061
Humboldt	50.46%	21,942	37.01%	16,095	4.11%	1,785	1.73%	754	6.69%	2,907
San Benito	49.63%	6,160	40.60%	5,039	2.88%	358	3.63%	451	3.26%	404
Stanislaus	49.38%	47,815	44.31%	42,908	1.79%	1,733	1.89%	1,832	2.63%	2,544
Del Norte	47.96%	3,396	42.73%	3,026	2.63%	186	1.64%	116	5.04%	357
San Joaquin	47.83%	57,052	45.00%	53,674	1.86%	2,213	2.25%	2,680	3.07%	3,655
San Bernardino	47.11%	149,773	44.58%	141,718	2.08%	6,603	2.89%	9,192	3.35%	10,632
Imperial	46.88%	10,583	39.41%	8,897	1.25%	283	8.64%	1,951	3.82%	861
Santa Barbara	46.48%	54,087	45.83%	53,337	2.34%	2,721	2.34%	2,728	3.00%	3,498
Tuolumne	46.11%	8,964	47.26%	9,188	2.26%	439	1.17%	228	3.19%	621
Ventura	45.75%	89,840	46.21%	90,737	2.33%	4,579	2.83%	5,554	2.88%	5,669
Fresno	45.55%	73,618	46.51%	75,166	2.25%	3,630	2.79%	4,504	2.91%	4,708
Alpine	44.63%	237	46.14%	245	2.82%	15	2.07%	11	4.33%	23
San Diego	44.62%	306,636	47.47%	326,178	2.65%	18,182	2.24%	15,370	3.03%	20,796
Kings	44.60%	9,683	47.28%	10,264	1.75%	381	2.75%	597	3.61%	785
Riverside	44.00%	142,273	48.19%	155,802	2.00%	6,472	2.55%	8,251	3.26%	10,536
Trinity	43.99%	2,097	43.93%	2,094	4.32%	206	1.57%	75	6.19%	295
Amador	43.56%	5,615	50.18%	6,469	2.61%	336	1.03%	133	2.62%	338
Siskiyou	43.05%	6,806	49.34%	7,800	3.20%	506	1.30%	205	3.10%	491
Tehama	42.46%	7,552	49.05%	8,724	2.74%	488	1.57%	280	4.17%	743
Yuba	42.26%	5,486	49.02%	6,363	2.39%	310	2.30%	299	4.02%	523
Butte	42.11%	26,399	49.70%	31,160	2.54%	1,595	1.80%	1,129	3.84%	2,409
Plumas	41.94%	3,417	51.33%	4,182	2.72%	222	1.15%	94	2.85%	232
San Luis Obispo	41.56%	34,000	51.42%	42,068	2.47%	2,018	1.62%	1,323	2.94%	2,401
Nevada	41.23%	15,396	51.41%	19,198	2.94%	1,097	1.23%	459	3.20%	1,196
Tulare	40.89%	28,995	51.60%	36,583	2.02%	1,435	2.61%	1,853	2.87%	2,037
Calaveras	40.73%	6,346	50.39%	7,852	4.76%	741	1.35%	210	2.78%	433
Mariposa	40.67%	2,776	50.38%	3,439	3.19%	218	1.29%	88	4.46%	305
Colusa	40.62%	1,904	53.45%	2,505	2.09%	98	1.43%	67	2.41%	113
Kern	39.88%	53,920	51.83%	70,067	2.13%	2,883	2.89%	3,903	3.27%	4,418
Placer	39.76%	33,577	54.02%	45,616	2.56%	2,161	1.14%	966	2.52%	2,128
El Dorado	39.74%	22,119	53.86%	29,977	2.73%	1,522	1.00%	557	2.66%	1,479
Mono	39.57%	1,297	52.78%	1,730	3.57%	117	0.92%	30	3.17%	104
Shasta	39.48%	20,217	52.47%	26,871	3.08%	1,578	1.37%	701	3.61%	1,846
Madera	39.18%	9,929	52.87%	13,398	2.30%	584	2.49%	632	3.15%	798
Glenn	38.40%	2,765	54.51%	3,925	2.01%	145	1.72%	124	3.36%	242
Orange	38.40%	259,013	54.34%	366,541	2.59%	17,504	1.92%	12,923	2.76%	18,609
Lassen	37.96%	3,021	53.27%	4,239	2.59%	206	1.88%	150	4.30%	342
Sutter	37.94%	8,044	55.94%	11,860	1.88%	399	1.78%	378	2.45%	519
Sierra	37.25%	618	51.05%	847	4.88%	81	2.17%	36	4.64%	77
Inyo	36.70%	2,376	56.10%	3,632	2.22%	144	1.37%	89	3.60%	233
Modoc	34.78%	1,159	56.63%	1,887	2.61%	87	2.16%	72	3.81%	127

== See also ==
- California state elections, 1998
- State of California
- California State Treasurer
