= Charles G. Cargill =

American politician (1846–1900)

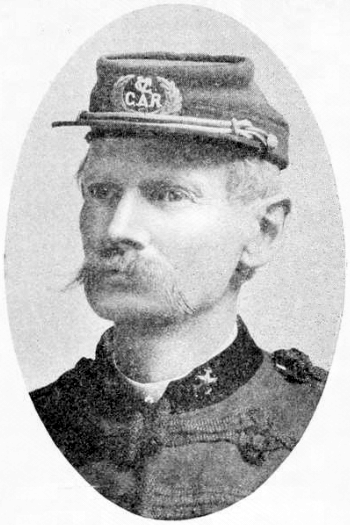

Member of the California State Assembly from the 59th district
- In office January 2, 1899 - June 18, 1900
- Preceded by: Claudius Frazier Rubell
- Succeeded by: William Higby
- In office January 7, 1895 - January 4, 1897
- Preceded by: John H. Matthews
- Succeeded by: Claudius Frazier Rubell

Member of the California State Assembly from the 68th district
- In office January 5, 1891 - January 2, 1893
- Preceded by: E. C. Tully
- Succeeded by: William Lyman Talbott

Personal details
- Born: May 24, 1846 Newbury, Vermont, US
- Died: June 17, 1900 (aged 54) San Juan Bautista, California, US
- Party: Republican
- Spouse: Sarah Isham Cowles (m. 1869)

Military service
- Branch/service: United States Army
- Battles/wars: American Civil War

Charles Guy Cargill (May 24, 1846 – June 17, 1900) served in the California State Assembly for the 59th district and 68th district and, during the American Civil War, he served in the United States Army.

== Biography ==
Charles G. Cargill was born in Newbury, Vermont on May 24, 1846. He married Sarah Isham Cowles on July 1, 1869.

He died from pneumonia at his home in San Juan Bautista, California on July 17, 1900.
