= 2014 Anaheim mayoral election =

- November 4, 2014
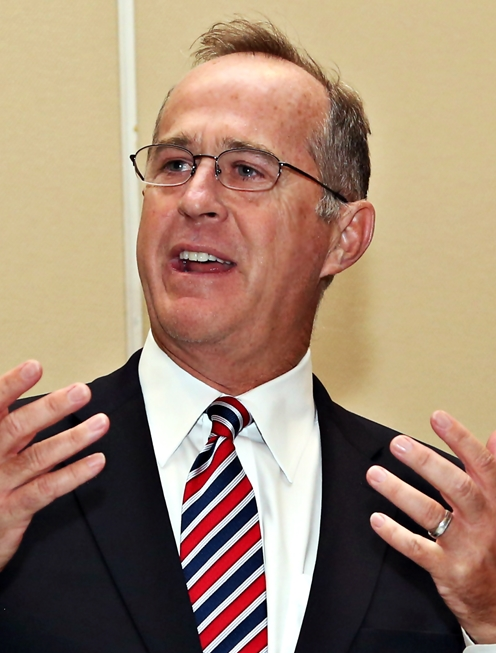

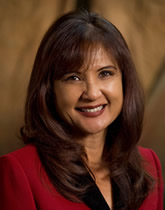

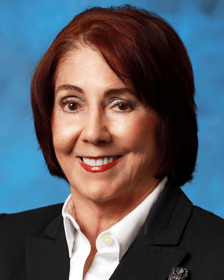
Candidate	Tom Tait	Lorri Galloway
Popular vote	24,116	9,235
Percentage	53.4%	20.4%
Candidate	Lucille Kring	Denis Fitzgerald
Popular vote	8,757	3,090
Percentage	19.4%	6.8%
Mayor before election
Tom Tait
Elected mayor
Tom Tait

The 2014 Anaheim mayoral election was held on November 4, 2014, to elect the mayor of Anaheim, California. It saw the reelection of Tom Tait.

Municipal elections in California are officially non-partisan.

== Results ==
Results
Candidate	Votes	%
Tom Tait (incumbent)	24,116	53.4
Lorri Galloway	9,235	20.4
Lucille Kring	8,757	19.4
Denis Fitzgerald	3,090	6.8
