= Allen G. Mitchell =

American politician

Member of the California State Assembly from the 68th district
- In office January 8, 1923 – January 5, 1925
- Preceded by: Ira A. Lee
- Succeeded by: Harry F. Sewell

Personal details
- Born: May 25, 1894 Montesano, Washington, US
- Died: February 23, 1952 (aged 57) Orange, California, US
- Party: Republican

Military service
- Branch/service: United States Army
- Battles/wars: World War I

Allen George Mitchell (May 5, 1894 – February 23, 1953) served in the California State Assembly for the 68th district from 1923 to 1925. During World War I he served in the United States Army.
