= John T. Rawls =

American politician

Member of the California State Assembly from the 68th district
- In office January 2, 1933 - January 7, 1935
- Preceded by: George H. Wilber
- Succeeded by: Fred Reaves

Personal details
- Born: July 15, 1903
- Died: November 20, 1962 (aged 59) California, US
- Party: Democratic

Military service
- Branch/service: United States Army
- Battles/wars: World War II

John T. Rawls (July 5, 1903 - November 20, 1962) served in the California State Assembly for the 68th district from 1933 to 1935 and during World War I he served in the United States Army.
