= E. C. Tully =

American politician (1826–1907)

Member of the California State Assembly from the 68th district
- In office January 7, 1889 - January 5, 1891
- Preceded by: John H. Matthews
- Succeeded by: Charles G. Cargill

Personal details
- Born: April 16, 1826 Memphis, Tennessee, US
- Died: March 3, 1907 (aged 80) Bitterwater, California, US
- Party: Democratic
- Spouse: Maria Guadalupe Quintanar
- Children: 11

Military service
- Branch/service: United States Army
- Battles/wars: Mexican-American War

Edward Chaffin Tully (April 16, 1826 in Memphis, Tennessee March 3, 1907 in Bitterwater, California) served as a member of the 1859–1860 California State Assembly, representing the 4th District. During the Mexican–American War he served in the US Army.
