= Ashleigh Aitken =

American politician

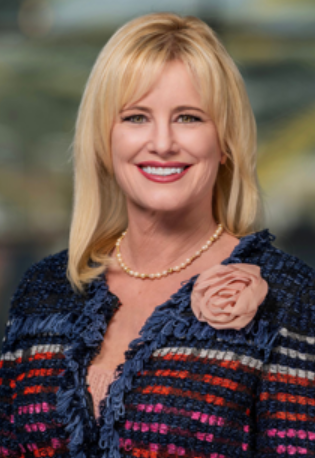

47th Mayor of Anaheim
- Incumbent
- Assumed office December 6, 2022
- Preceded by: Harry Sidhu

Personal details
- Born: October 9, 1975 (age 50) Fullerton, California, U.S.
- Party: Democratic
- Spouse: Michael Penn
- Children: 3
- Education: Boston College (BA); USC Gould School of Law (JD)

Ashleigh Aitken (born October 9, 1975) is an American Democratic politician who is the 47th mayor of Anaheim, California, serving since December 2022.

== Early life and career ==
Aitken was born at St. Jude Medical Center in Fullerton, California. She graduated from Rosary High School in Fullerton. Aitken earned a Bachelor of Arts in secondary education and history from Boston College. She was a history teacher at North Quincy High School and then worked in the Washington, D.C. office of Dick Gephardt, the Democratic leader of the United States House of Representatives. She then attended the University of Southern California's Gould School of Law.

Aitken practices law for the law firm Aitken Aitken Cohn with her husband, father, and two brothers. In 2012 California Governor Jerry Brown appointed Aitken to the nine-member board of directors for the Orange County Fair.

== Electoral career ==
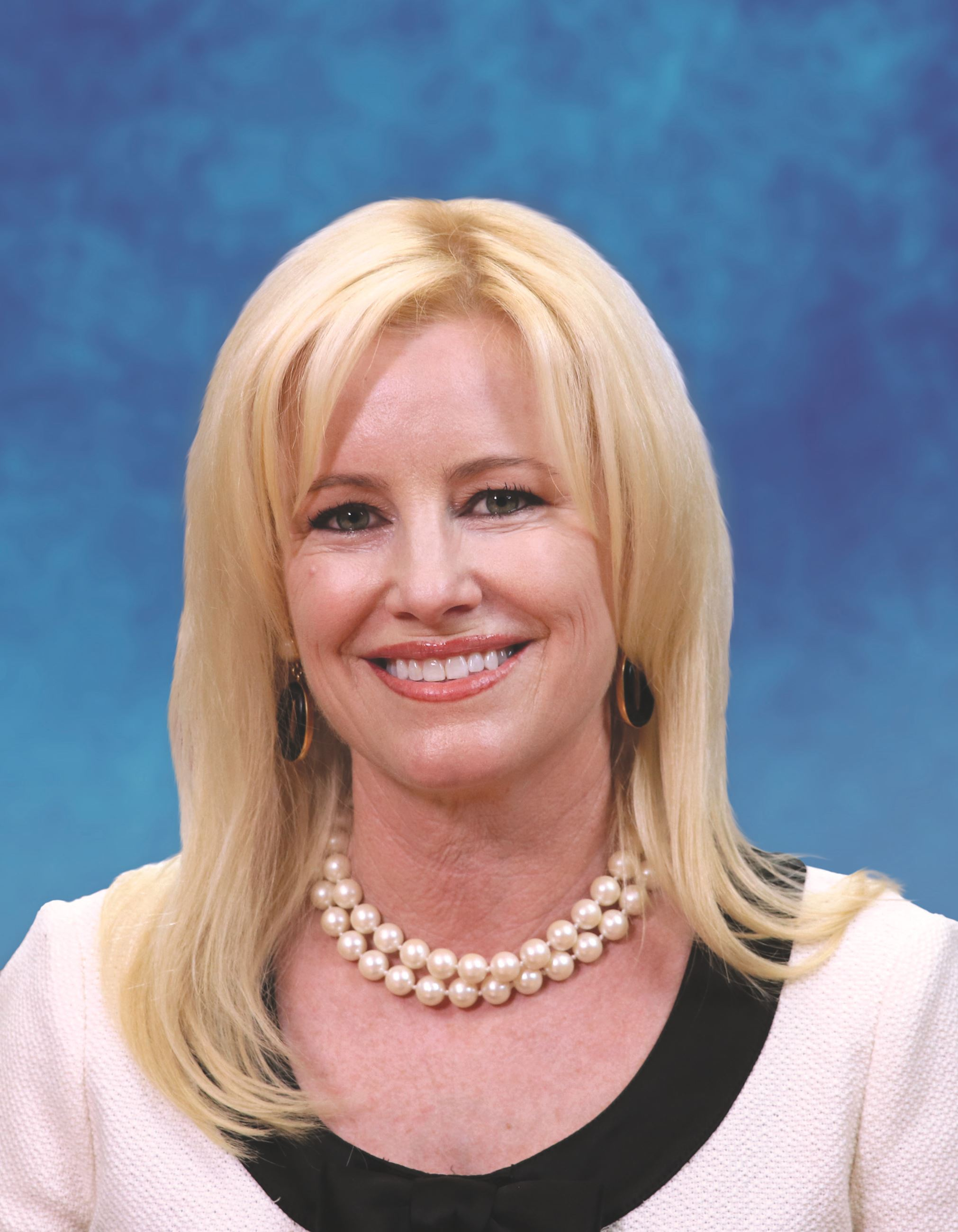
Mayor Ashleigh Aitken First Mayoral Portrait

Aitken ran for mayor of Anaheim in the 2018 election, losing to Harry Sidhu, 32.5% to 31.9%. She ran for the third district seat on the Orange County Board of Supervisors in 2020, challenging Donald P. Wagner, and lost. She won the 2022 Anaheim mayoral election and was sworn into office on December 6. Aitken is the first female mayor of Anaheim.

== Personal life ==
Aitken met her husband, Michael Penn, on a blind date. They married in 2002, and have three daughters.

== Electoral history ==
2018 Anaheim mayoral election
Candidate	Votes	%
Harry Sidhu	26,422	32.5%
Ashleigh Aitken	25,944	31.9%
Lorri Galloway	12,367	15.2%
Cynthia Ward	7,121	8.7%
H. Fuji Shioura	3,024	3.7%
Robert Williams	2,824	3.5%
Rudy Gaona	2,506	3.1%
Tony D. Martin	1,199	1.5%
Total votes	81,407	100%

2020 Orange County Board of Supervisors election, 3rd district
Party	Candidate	Votes	%
Republican	Donald P. Wagner (incumbent)	80,544	52.3
Democratic	Ashleigh Aitken	73,334	47.7
Total votes		153,878	100.0
Republican hold			

2022 Anaheim mayoral election
Candidate	Votes	%
Ashleigh Aitken	28,493	42.85%
Trevor O'Neil	22,948	34.51%
Lorri Galloway	11,282	16.97%
Dick Lopez	3,770	5.67%
Total votes	66,493	100.00%
