= California's 68th State Assembly district =

American legislative district

Current assemblymember
| Avelino Valencia; D–Anaheim |
- Population (2010) • Voting age • Citizen voting age: 463,053; 348,844; 283,274
- Demographics: 48.63% White; 1.78% Black; 28.07% Latino; 19.99% Asian; 0.45% Native American; 0.31% Hawaiian/Pacific Islander; 0.27% other; 0.50% remainder of multiracial
- Registered voters: 281,656
- Registration: 35.32% Republican; 34.64% Democratic; 25.35% No party preference

California's 68th State Assembly district is one of 80 California State Assembly districts. It is currently represented by Democratic Avelino Valencia.

== District profile ==
The district encompasses inland central Orange County, running along the Santa Ana Mountains. The district is primarily suburban and affluent, with several planned communities.

Orange County – 15.4%

- Anaheim – 21.6%
- Irvine – 34.0%
- Lake Forest
- Orange – 92.6%
- Tustin
- North Tustin
- Villa Park

== Election results from statewide races ==
| Year | Office | Results |
|---|---|---|
| 2021 | Recall | No 52.0 – 48.0% |
| 2020 | President | Biden 54.3 – 43.5% |
| 2018 | Governor | Cox 51.4 – 48.6% |
| 2018 | Senator | Feinstein 52.6 – 47.4% |
| 2016 | President | Clinton 49.4 – 44.6% |
| 2016 | Senator | Harris 57.2 – 42.8% |
| 2014 | Governor | Kashkari 60.1 – 39.9% |
| 2012 | President | Romney 55.1 – 42.6% |
| 2012 | Senator | Emken 56.4 – 43.6% |

== List of assembly members representing the district ==
Due to redistricting, the 68th district has been moved around different parts of the state. The current iteration resulted from the 2021 redistricting by the California Citizens Redistricting Commission.

| Assembly members | Party | Years served | Counties represented | Notes |
|---|---|---|---|---|
| Maurice Timothy Dooling | Democratic | January 5, 1885 – January 3, 1887 | San Benito | |
| John H. Matthews | Democratic | January 3, 1887 – January 7, 1889 | San Benito | |
| E. C. Tully | Democratic | January 7, 1889 – January 5, 1891 | San Benito | |
| Charles G. Cargill | Republican | January 5, 1891 – January 2, 1893 | San Benito | |
| William Lyman Talbott | Republican | January 2, 1893 – January 7, 1895 | Santa Barbara | |
| James L. Barker | People's | January 7, 1895 – January 4, 1897 | Santa Barbara | |
| L. Harris | Republican | January 4, 1897 – January 2, 1899 | Santa Barbara | |
| Charles Warren Merritt | Republican | January 2, 1899 – January 5, 1903 | Santa Barbara | |
| William A. Johnstone | Republican | January 5, 1903 – January 7, 1907 | Los Angeles | |
| Prescott F. Cogswell | Republican | January 7, 1907 – January 6, 1913 | Los Angeles | |
| William A. Johnstone | Republican | January 6, 1913 – January 4, 1915 | Los Angeles | |
| Lewis L. Lostutter | Republican | January 4, 1915 – January 8, 1917 | Los Angeles | |
| Earl R. Shepherd | Republican | January 8, 1917 – January 6, 1919 | Los Angeles | |
| Henry A. Miller | Republican | January 6, 1919 – January 3, 1921 | Los Angeles | |
| Ira A. Lee | Republican | January 3, 1921 – January 8, 1923 | Los Angeles | |
| Allen G. Mitchell | Republican | January 8, 1923 – January 5, 1925 | Los Angeles | |
| Harry F. Sewell | Republican | January 5, 1925 – January 5, 1931 | Los Angeles | |
| George H. Wilber | Republican | January 5, 1931 – January 2, 1933 | Los Angeles | |
| John T. Rawls | Democratic | January 2, 1933 – January 7, 1935 | Los Angeles | |
| Fred Reaves | Democratic | January 7, 1935 – May 20, 1940 | Los Angeles | Died in office. Died from heart failure. |
| Vacant | | May 20, 1940 – January 6, 1941 | Los Angeles | |
| Vincent Thomas | Democratic | January 6, 1941 – November 30, 1974 | Los Angeles | |
| Walter M. Ingalls | Democratic | December 2, 1974 – November 30, 1982 | Riverside | |
| Steve Clute | Democratic | December 6, 1982 – November 30, 1992 | Riverside | |
| Curt Pringle | Republican | December 7, 1992 – November 30, 1998 | Orange | |
| Ken Maddox | Republican | December 7, 1998 – November 30, 2004 | Orange | |
| Van Tran | Republican | December 6, 2004 – November 30, 2010 | Orange | |
| Allan Mansoor | Republican | December 6, 2010 – November 30, 2012 | Orange | |
| Donald P. Wagner | Republican | December 3, 2012 – November 30, 2016 | Orange | |
| Steven Choi | Republican | December 5, 2016 – November 30, 2022 | Orange | |
| Avelino Valencia | Democratic | December 5, 2022 – December 7, 2026 | Orange | |
| Jessie Lopez | Democratic | December 7, 2026 | Orange | |

== Election results (1990–present) ==
=== 2026 ===
2026 California State Assembly 68th district election
Primary election
| Party | Candidate | Votes | % |
|---|---|---|---|
| Democratic | David Penaloza | 23,305 | 32.5 |
| Democratic | Jessie Lopez | 22,504 | 31.4 |
| Republican | Mayra Ruiz | 21,047 | 29.4 |
| Democratic | Shannon Winfield | 4,757 | 6.6 |
| Total votes | | 71,613 | 100.0 |
General election
| Democratic | Jessie Lopez | 57,681 | 52.3 |
| Democratic | David Penaloza | 52,641 | 47.7 |
| Total votes | | 110,322 | 100.0 |
| Democratic hold | | | |

=== 2024 ===
2024 California State Assembly 68th district election
Primary election
| Party | Candidate | Votes | % |
|---|---|---|---|
| Democratic | Avelino Valencia (incumbent) | 28,985 | 58.8 |
| Republican | Mike Tardif | 20,320 | 41.2 |
| Total votes | | 49,305 | 100.0 |
General election
| Democratic | Avelino Valencia (incumbent) | 84,259 | 63.7 |
| Republican | Mike Tardif | 47,975 | 36.3 |
| Total votes | | 132,234 | 100.0 |
| Democratic hold | | | |

=== 2022 ===
2022 California State Assembly 68th district election
Primary election
| Party | Candidate | Votes | % |
|---|---|---|---|
| Democratic | Avelino Valencia | 22,635 | 48.3 |
| Republican | Mike Tardif | 11,034 | 23.5 |
| Democratic | Bulmaro Vicente | 7,029 | 15.0 |
| Republican | James Wallace | 6,189 | 13.2 |
| Total votes | | 46,887 | 100.0 |
General election
| Democratic | Avelino Valencia | 49,385 | 62.3 |
| Republican | Mike Tardif | 29,910 | 37.7 |
| Total votes | | 79,295 | 100.0 |
| Democratic gain from Republican | | | |

=== 2020 ===
2020 California State Assembly 68th district election
Primary election
| Party | Candidate | Votes | % |
|---|---|---|---|
| Republican | Steven Choi (incumbent) | 57,633 | 43.8 |
| Democratic | Melissa Fox | 44,033 | 33.5 |
| Democratic | Eugene Fields | 17,332 | 13.2 |
| Republican | Benjamin Yu | 12,503 | 9.5 |
| Total votes | | 131,501 | 100.0 |
General election
| Republican | Steven Choi (incumbent) | 136,841 | 53.1 |
| Democratic | Melissa Fox | 120,965 | 46.9 |
| Total votes | | 257,806 | 100.0 |
| Republican hold | | | |

=== 2018 ===
2018 California State Assembly 68th district election
Primary election
| Party | Candidate | Votes | % |
|---|---|---|---|
| Republican | Steven Choi (incumbent) | 57,099 | 59.0 |
| Democratic | Michelle Duman | 39,751 | 41.0 |
| Total votes | | 96,850 | 100.0 |
General election
| Republican | Steven Choi (incumbent) | 96,611 | 53.1 |
| Democratic | Michelle Duman | 85,164 | 46.9 |
| Total votes | | 181,755 | 100.0 |
| Republican hold | | | |

=== 2016 ===
2016 California State Assembly 68th district election
Primary election
| Party | Candidate | Votes | % |
|---|---|---|---|
| Democratic | Sean Jay Panahi | 32,610 | 33.0 |
| Republican | Steven Choi | 19,559 | 19.8 |
| Republican | Harry Sidhu | 19,405 | 19.7 |
| Republican | Deborah Pauly | 13,880 | 14.1 |
| Republican | Alexia Deligianni-Brydges | 5,098 | 5.2 |
| No party preference | Brian Chuchua | 4,635 | 4.7 |
| Republican | Kostas Roditis | 3,528 | 3.6 |
| Total votes | | 98,715 | 100.0 |
General election
| Republican | Steven Choi | 114,210 | 60.3 |
| Democratic | Sean Jay Panahi | 75,231 | 39.7 |
| Total votes | | 189,441 | 100.0 |
| Republican hold | | | |

=== 2014 ===
2014 California State Assembly 68th district election
Primary election
| Party | Candidate | Votes | % |
|---|---|---|---|
| Republican | Donald P. Wagner (incumbent) | 35,223 | 69.7 |
| Democratic | Anne Cameron | 15,297 | 30.3 |
| Total votes | | 50,520 | 100.0 |
General election
| Republican | Donald P. Wagner (incumbent) | 66,445 | 68.4 |
| Democratic | Anne Cameron | 30,749 | 31.6 |
| Total votes | | 97,194 | 100.0 |
| Republican hold | | | |

=== 2012 ===
2012 California State Assembly 68th district election
Primary election
| Party | Candidate | Votes | % |
|---|---|---|---|
| Republican | Donald P. Wagner (incumbent) | 43,241 | 69.2 |
| Democratic | Christina Avalos | 19,254 | 30.8 |
| Total votes | | 62,495 | 100.0 |
General election
| Republican | Donald P. Wagner (incumbent) | 104,706 | 60.8 |
| Democratic | Christina Avalos | 67,448 | 39.2 |
| Total votes | | 172,154 | 100.0 |
| Republican hold | | | |

=== 2010 ===
2010 California State Assembly 68th district election
| Party | Candidate | Votes | % |
|---|---|---|---|
| Republican | Allan Mansoor | 57,016 | 54.9 |
| Democratic | Phu Nguyen | 46,269 | 44.6 |
| Republican | Long Pham (write-in) | 617 | 0.5 |
| Total votes | | 103,902 | 100.0 |
| Republican hold | | | |

=== 2008 ===
2008 California State Assembly 68th district election
| Party | Candidate | Votes | % |
|---|---|---|---|
| Republican | Van Tran (incumbent) | 72,034 | 54.0 |
| Democratic | Kenneth Arnold | 61,239 | 46.0 |
| Total votes | | 133,273 | 100.0 |
| Republican hold | | | |

=== 2006 ===
2006 California State Assembly 68th district election
| Party | Candidate | Votes | % |
|---|---|---|---|
| Republican | Van Tran (incumbent) | 55,155 | 61.7 |
| Democratic | Paul Lucas | 34,277 | 38.3 |
| Total votes | | 89,432 | 100.0 |
| Republican hold | | | |

=== 2004 ===
2004 California State Assembly 68th district election
| Party | Candidate | Votes | % |
|---|---|---|---|
| Republican | Van Tran | 78,606 | 60.9 |
| Democratic | Al Snook | 50,453 | 39.1 |
| Total votes | | 129,059 | 100.0 |
| Republican hold | | | |

=== 2002 ===
2002 California State Assembly 68th district election
| Party | Candidate | Votes | % |
|---|---|---|---|
| Republican | Ken Maddox (incumbent) | 51,316 | 65.1 |
| Democratic | Al Snook | 23,721 | 30.1 |
| Libertarian | Douglas J. Scribner | 3,810 | 4.8 |
| Total votes | | 78,847 | 100.0 |
| Republican hold | | | |

=== 2000 ===
2000 California State Assembly 68th district election
| Party | Candidate | Votes | % |
|---|---|---|---|
| Republican | Ken Maddox (incumbent) | 59,258 | 56.7 |
| Democratic | Tina L. Laine | 35,889 | 34.3 |
| Natural Law | Al Snook | 5,466 | 5.2 |
| Libertarian | Richard G. Newhouse | 3,897 | 3.7 |
| Total votes | | 104,510 | 100.0 |
| Republican hold | | | |

=== 1998 ===
1998 California State Assembly 68th district election
| Party | Candidate | Votes | % |
|---|---|---|---|
| Republican | Ken Maddox | 41,326 | 53.7 |
| Democratic | Mike Matsuda | 35,654 | 46.3 |
| Total votes | | 76,980 | 100.0 |
| Republican hold | | | |

=== 1996 ===
1996 California State Assembly 68th district election
| Party | Candidate | Votes | % |
|---|---|---|---|
| Republican | Curt Pringle (incumbent) | 56,493 | 58.7 |
| Democratic | Audrey L. Gibson | 39,754 | 41.3 |
| Total votes | | 96,247 | 100.0 |
| Republican hold | | | |

=== 1994 ===
1994 California State Assembly 68th district election
| Party | Candidate | Votes | % |
|---|---|---|---|
| Republican | Curt Pringle (incumbent) | 51,977 | 63.3 |
| Democratic | Irv Pickler | 30,184 | 36.7 |
| Total votes | | 82,161 | 100.0 |
| Republican hold | | | |

=== 1992 ===
1992 California State Assembly 68th district election
| Party | Candidate | Votes | % |
|---|---|---|---|
| Republican | Curt Pringle | 61,615 | 57.1 |
| Democratic | Linda Kay Rigney | 46,222 | 42.9 |
| Total votes | | 107,837 | 100.0 |
| Republican gain from Democratic | | | |

=== 1990 ===
1990 California State Assembly 68th district election
| Party | Candidate | Votes | % |
|---|---|---|---|
| Democratic | Steve Clute (incumbent) | 51,203 | 57.5 |
| Republican | Clay Hage | 37,812 | 42.5 |
| Total votes | | 89,015 | 100.0 |
| Democratic hold | | | |

== See also ==
- California State Assembly
- California State Assembly districts
- Districts in California
