= Curt Pringle =

American politician (born 1959)

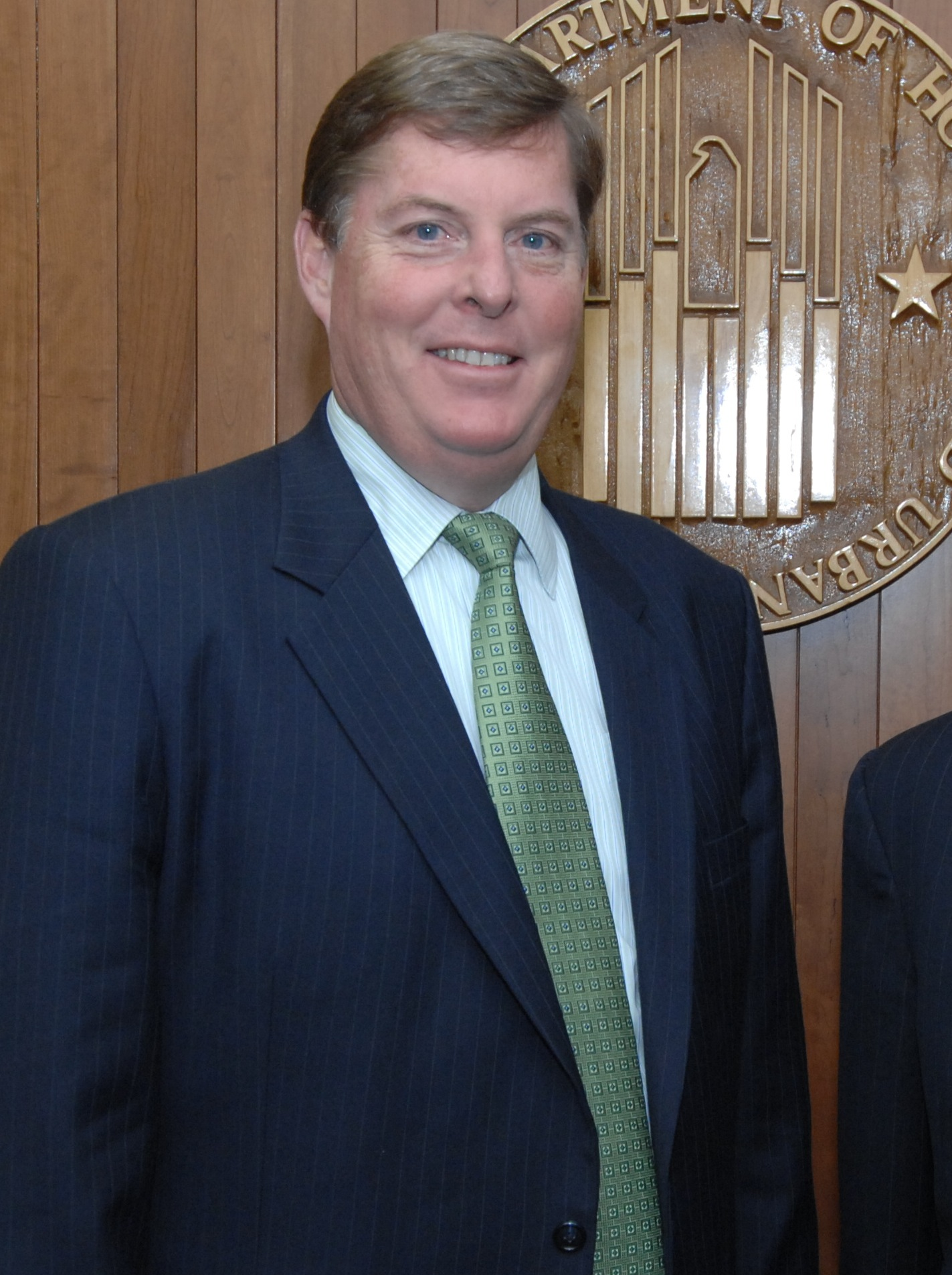

44th Mayor of Anaheim
- In office December 3, 2002 – December 7, 2010
- Preceded by: Tom Daly
- Succeeded by: Tom Tait

Minority Leader of the California Assembly
- In office December 2, 1996 – June 17, 1997
- Preceded by: Richard Katz
- Succeeded by: Bill Leonard

61st Speaker of the California State Assembly
- In office January 4, 1996 – November 30, 1996
- Preceded by: Brian Setencich
- Succeeded by: Cruz Bustamante

Majority Leader of the California Assembly
- In office August 22, 1995 – January 4, 1996
- Preceded by: Jim Brulte
- Succeeded by: Jim Rogan

Member of the California State Assembly
- In office December 7, 1992 – November 30, 1998
- Preceded by: Steve Clute
- Succeeded by: Ken Maddox
- Constituency: 68th district
- In office December 5, 1988 – November 30, 1990
- Preceded by: Dick Longshore
- Succeeded by: Tom Umberg
- Constituency: 72nd district

Personal details
- Born: Curtis L. Pringle; June 27, 1959 (age 67) Emmetsburg, Iowa, U.S.
- Party: Republican
- Spouse: Alexis (m. 1984)
- Children: 2
- Education: California State University, Long Beach (BBA, MPA)
- Website: Official website

Curtis L. "Curt" Pringle (born June 27, 1959) is an American politician from the U.S. state of California. He is the most recent Republican to have served as the Speaker of the California State Assembly. He is a former mayor of Anaheim and a former chairman of the California High-Speed Rail Authority. Since leaving office, Pringle has operated a public relations and government affairs firm, Curt Pringle & Associates.

== Early life and education ==
Pringle was born in Emmetsburg, Iowa, in 1959, but moved to California with his family at the age of nine in 1968 and settled in Garden Grove. Pringle then earned a bachelor's degree in business administration and a master's degree in public administration from California State University, Long Beach.

== Career ==
As a young man, Pringle worked for his family's drycleaning and drapery/window covering business. In 1986, after three unsuccessful runs for a seat on the Garden Grove City Council, Pringle was elected to the Orange County Republican Central Committee, which is the controlling organ of the Orange County Republican Party. Pringle served as vice-chair of the Orange County Republican Central Committee.

In 1988, the Republican nominee from Pringle's Assembly district, freshman incumbent Dick Longshore, died the day after the June primary election, and, under Californian law, the Orange County Republican Central Committee members were charged with selecting a replacement nominee to run in the November general election, and out of the ten candidates, they chose Pringle.

In his first campaign for the State Assembly, Pringle was accused of voter suppression against Hispanics in Santa Ana. The Orange County Republican Party hired a security guard firm to protect against supposed unlawful voting by illegal aliens in Pringle's district. Some claimed this was an effort to scare Hispanic voters. The FBI investigated and no charges were filed against Pringle and the local GOP, however they agreed to pay $400,000 to settle the civil lawsuit out of court.

=== California State Assembly ===
Pringle took office as a state assemblyman in December 1988 at the age of 29. In 1990, he was defeated for re-election by Democrat Tom Umberg in 1990. After the redistricting of 1991, Pringle ran and was elected to the district, Assembly in 1992. He also won re-election in 1994 and 1996 and left the Assembly, due to term limits in 1998.

Pringle worked his way up the Republican hierarchy in the Assembly. After the Assembly Republicans won a majority in the 1994 election, Pringle, the Assistant Republican Leader at the time, also was appointed the Chair of the Assembly Appropriations Committee. He served in that capacity for most of 1995, when the Assembly operated under a power sharing agreement with a split house. Later in 1995, Pringle was elected the Assembly Republican Leader and became the Majority Leader of the Assembly, before being elected Speaker in January 1996. In 1996, Assemblywoman Doris Allen was recalled from office in a in as tough campaign between Republicans and several Democrats. This recall campaign was marred by the tactic of some Republicans to aid Democratic primary decoy candidate Laurie Campbell in an attempt to split the Democratic ticket and thus weaken the candidacy of Democrat Linda Moulton-Patterson who was running against Republican Scott Baugh for Allen's former seat. Mark Richard Denny, an aide to Pringle, admitted that he illegally circulated election nominating petitions for Campbell in order to split the Democratic vote. In addition, Jeff Gibson, another campaign aide to Pringle, also pleaded guilty to illegally gathering nomination signatures for the Campbell campaign.

Willie Brown stated that Pringle was the last state Assembly Speaker to wield broad power in the office, since rule changes immediately after Pringle's tenure transferred much of the Speaker's authority to committee chairmen. Pringle, for example, issued committee assignments to both parties' members, controlled State Assembly funds, and had broad administrative authority. As Speaker, Pringle also chaired the Assembly Rules Committee.

=== Mayor of Anaheim ===
In 2002, Pringle re-entered electoral politics with his campaign for mayor of Anaheim, California, the tenth-most populous city in the state. Pringle won a multi-candidate race, with 36% of the vote, finishing 7% ahead of his nearest competitor, Anaheim city councilwoman Lucille King (29%). During his tenure as mayor Pringle and the Anaheim City Council over which he presided enacted a number of reforms that the Orange County Register depicted as "freedom-friendly". According to the Los Angeles Times, "Pringle has built such a strong reputation for his aggressive pro-business approach to governance (creative tax waivers, sweeping zone changes, market incentives to redevelop run-down parts of the city) that other local officials have coined a verb for his philosophy: 'to Pringle-ize.'"

As an active mayor, governing with majority support on the city council, Pringle led the effort to transform the area surrounding Angel Stadium and Honda Center (formerly the Arrowhead Pond) into the Platinum Triangle, which is meant to be Orange County's "downtown". He was also the public face for the city as it courted the National Football League for a football franchise and fought the Angels baseball club over its name change from "Anaheim Angels" to "Los Angeles Angels of Anaheim."

Pringle was also seen occasionally with mayors of other major California cities when they traveled to Sacramento to collectively lobby the governor and California State Legislature.

He has a good relationship with Los Angeles Mayor Antonio Villaraigosa, a Democrat and former Speaker of the Assembly, whom he knows from their years together in Sacramento, and Pringle even hosted a fundraiser for Villaraigosa's unsuccessful 2001 bid for L.A. Mayor.

Pringle was also a member of the Orange County Transportation Authority's board of directors. In August 2006, the Los Angeles Times's West magazine named Pringle as one of the 100 most powerful people in Southern California. And the OC Metro magazine listed Pringle in their Hot 25 for 2006.

Pringle faced only nominal opposition for a second term as mayor, after his chief critic on the city council, Harry Sidhu, endorsed him. Pringle raised nearly half a million dollars for his re-election bid, as opposed to his nominal opponent, William Fitzgerald, who raised very little. On November 7, Pringle was re-elected with 79% of the vote, the highest percentage of any local candidate in Orange County who faced opposition in 2006.

Pringle serves as a member of the Board of Trustees of Woodbury University in Burbank, California.

=== Business ===
After losing to Phil Angelides in the 1998 race for California State Treasurer, Pringle launched a government affairs, public relations, and entitlement firm, Curt Pringle & Associates, LLC, of which he is currently president. His firm's clients have included ARCO, the County of Orange, the City of Newport Beach, Yamaha, and Jack in the Box.

Curt Pringle and Associates is based in Anaheim.

Pringle was also appointed in 1998 by Governor Pete Wilson to the Orange County Fair Board, where he served for four years. He was also appointed in 2007 by Governor Arnold Schwarzenegger to the Public Employees Post Employment Benefits Commission and to the California High-Speed Rail Authority, serving four and a half years, including two years as chairman of the Authority before resigning.

Pringle served from 2010 until 2015 as chairman of the Orange County Taxpayers Association. Cal State Fullerton's Center for Oral and Public History recognized Pringle in its 2020 Celebrating Orange County's Political Legacy event.

In addition to his political work, Pringle has served as an adjunct professor at the University of California, Irvine and Chapman University, where he has taught Californian politics and government.

== Personal life ==
He has been married to his wife Alexis since 1984, with whom he has two children (Kyle and Katie).

== Electoral history ==
2006 Anaheim mayoral election
| Party | Candidate | Votes | % |
|---|---|---|---|
| Nonpartisan | Curt Pringle* | 41,449 | 79.0 |
| Nonpartisan | William Fitzgerald | 11,004 | 21.0 |
| Nonpartisan hold | | | |

2002 Anaheim mayoral election
| Party | Candidate | Votes | % |
|---|---|---|---|
| Nonpartisan | Curt Pringle | 16,146 | 35.9 |
| Nonpartisan | Lucille Kring | 12,142 | 27.0 |
| Nonpartisan | Frank Feldhaus | 9,783 | 21.7 |
| Nonpartisan | Steve Staveley | 6,928 | 15.4 |
| Nonpartisan hold | | | |

1998 California State Treasurer election
| Party | Candidate | Votes | % |
|---|---|---|---|
| Democratic | Phil Angelides | 4,166,206 | 52.60 |
| Republican | Curt Pringle | 3,159,898 | 39.90 |
| Libertarian | John Petersen | 183,436 | 2.32 |
| Natural Law | Carlos Aguirre | 172,844 | 2.18 |
| Peace and Freedom | Jan B. Tucker | 146,226 | 1.85 |
| American Independent | Edmon V. Kaiser | 91,801 | 1.16 |
| Invalid or blank votes | | 427,354 | 4.96 |
| Total votes | | 7,920,411 | 100.00 |
| Turnout | | | 41.32 |
| Democratic gain from Republican | | | |

1998 California State Treasurer election Republican primary
| Party | Candidate | Votes | % |
|---|---|---|---|
| Republican | Curt Pringle | 1,506,892 | 62.20 |
| Republican | Jan Goldsmith | 915,787 | 37.80 |

1996 Election for Speaker of the California State Assembly
| Party | Candidate | Votes | % |
|---|---|---|---|
| Democratic | Cruz Bustamante (31st) | 43 | 53.75 |
| Republican | Curt Pringle (68th) | 37 | 46.25 |
| Total votes | | 80 | 100 |
| Votes necessary | | 41 | >50 |

California's 68th State Assembly district election, 1996
| Party | Candidate | Votes | % |
|---|---|---|---|
| Republican | Curt Pringle* | 56,493 | 58.7 |
| Democratic | Audrey Gibson | 39,754 | 41.3 |
| Republican hold | | | |

California's 68th State Assembly district election, 1996 Republican primary
| Party | Candidate | Votes | % |
|---|---|---|---|
| Republican | Curt Pringle | 24,469 | 100.0 |

1995 Election for Speaker of the California State Assembly
| Party | Candidate | Votes | % |
|---|---|---|---|
| Republican | Curt Pringle (68th) | 40 | 51.9 |
| Republican | Brian Setencich (30th) | 37 | 48.1 |
| Total votes | | 77 | 100 |
| Votes necessary | | 39 | >50 |

California's 68th State Assembly district election, 1994
| Party | Candidate | Votes | % |
|---|---|---|---|
| Republican | Curt Pringle* | 51,977 | 63.3 |
| Democratic | Irv Pickler | 30,184 | 36.7 |
| Republican hold | | | |

California's 68th State Assembly district election, 1994 Republican primary
| Party | Candidate | Votes | % |
|---|---|---|---|
| Republican | Curt Pringle* | 20,848 | 100.0 |

California's 68th State Assembly district election, 1992
| Party | Candidate | Votes | % |
|---|---|---|---|
| Republican | Curt Pringle | 61,615 | 57.1 |
| Democratic | Linda Kay Rigney | 46,222 | 42.9 |
| Republican hold | | | |

California's 68th State Assembly district election, 1992 Republican primary
| Party | Candidate | Votes | % |
|---|---|---|---|
| Republican | Curt Pringle | 17,346 | 60.9 |
| Republican | Joy Neugebauer | 6,313 | 22.1 |
| Republican | Rhonda McCune | 4,840 | 17.0 |

California's 72nd State Assembly district election, 1990
| Party | Candidate | Votes | % |
|---|---|---|---|
| Democratic | Tom Umberg | 25,247 | 51.9 |
| Republican | Curt Pringle | 23,411 | 48.1 |
| Democratic gain from Republican | | | |

California's 72nd State Assembly district election, 1988
| Party | Candidate | Votes | % |
|---|---|---|---|
| Republican | Curt Pringle | 34,037 | 50.6 |
| Democratic | Rick Thierbach | 33,194 | 49.4 |
| Republican hold | | | |

California Assembly
| Preceded by Dick Longshore | California State Assemblyman; 72nd District; December 5, 1988 – November 30, 1990 | Succeeded by Tom Umberg |
| Preceded by Steve Clute | California State Assemblyman; 68th District; December 7, 1992 – November 30, 1998 | Succeeded by Ken Maddox |
Party political offices
| Preceded by Unknown | Majority Leader of the California State Assembly; August 22, 1995 – January 4, 1996 | Succeeded by Jim Rogan |
| Preceded by Richard Katz | Minority Leader of the California State Assembly; December 2, 1996 – June 17, 1997 | Succeeded by Bill Leonard |
Political offices
| Preceded by Brian Setencich | Speaker of the California State Assembly; January 4, 1996 – November 30, 1996 | Succeeded by Cruz Bustamante |
| Preceded by Tom Daly | Mayor of Anaheim, California; December 3, 2002 – December 7, 2010 | Succeeded by Tom Tait |
