= Edgar O. Campbell =

American politician (1867–1947)

Member of the California State Assembly from the 59th district
- In office January 5, 1925 - January 3, 1927
- Preceded by: Edgar W. Stow
- Succeeded by: Theodore Randolph Finley, Sr.

Personal details
- Born: September 12, 1867 Carrollton, Illinois, US
- Died: December 31, 1947 (aged 80) Santa Barbara, California, US
- Party: Republican
- Spouse: Frances Louisa Campbell (m. 1900)
- Children: 2

Military service
- Branch/service: United States Army
- Battles/wars: World War I

Edgar Omer Campbell (September 12, 1867 - December 31, 1947) served in the California State Assembly for the 59th district from 1925 to 1927 and during World War I he served in the United States Army.
