= Tim Donnelly (politician) =

American politician (born 1966)

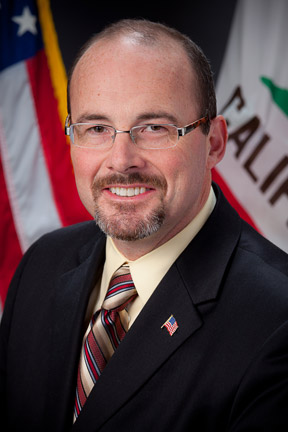

Member of the California State Assembly
- In office December 6, 2010 – November 30, 2014
- Preceded by: Anthony Adams
- Succeeded by: Jay Obernolte
- Constituency: 59th district (2010–2012); 33rd district (2012–2014)

Personal details
- Born: Timothy Michael Donnelly; May 9, 1966 (age 60) Atlanta, Georgia, U.S.
- Party: Republican
- Spouse: Rowena Donnelly
- Children: 4
- Education: University of Michigan, Ann Arbor; University of California, Irvine (BA)

Timothy Michael Donnelly (born May 9, 1966) is an American Republican politician who was a member of the California State Assembly, representing the 59th and 33rd districts. Before his election to the Assembly in November 2010, Donnelly was a small businessman. He resides in Twin Peaks, California. On January 22, 2013, Donnelly announced his intention to seek the Republican nomination for Governor of California in the 2014 election. He placed third in the open primary, behind incumbent governor Jerry Brown and investment banker Neel Kashkari, who contested the election in November 2014.

== Early years and personal life ==
Donnelly was born in Atlanta, Georgia and raised in Berkley, Michigan, the third of 14 children. Donnelly graduated from Southfield Christian School in 1984. He attended the University of Michigan for a year and earned a bachelor's degree in English from the University of California, Irvine in 1989. After college he worked in a family business. Five years later, Donnelly started his own company.

Donnelly is married to Rowena Donnelly who is of Filipino descent. They have five children.

== Political career ==
During his political career, Donnelly was an "unabashed social conservative popular among the most conservative GOP stalwarts" and was a favored candidate of the Tea Party movement. He was known as "the Legislature's most outspoken gun rights advocate and opponent of illegal immigration." Olivia Nuzzi described Donnelly as far right. His home region, the California High Desert, is "arguably the most conservative part of the state."

=== Minuteman Project ===
In 2005, Donnelly became involved with the Minuteman movement, and founded the Minuteman Party in California. He stepped down from the Minutemen to return to private life in 2006.

=== Election to the California Assembly ===
In 2009, following the announcement that embattled 59th District Assemblyman Anthony Adams would not seek re-election, Donnelly announced his candidacy. Appealing to Tea Party voters, he ran in the 2010 semi-closed primary election, and narrowly won the Republican nomination over Covina City Councilman Christopher Lancaster, son of former state Assemblyman William H. Lancaster. He won the general election on November 2, 2010, with 57.3% of the vote, to the Democratic Party nominee's 36.8%.

=== Pedro Ramirez ===
In March 2011, Donnelly drove three hours from Sacramento to Fresno to appear before the California State University, Fresno student senate committee, in an attempt to oust the student body president Pedro Ramirez, a student in good standing at the university. Ramirez was brought by his parents to the U.S. from Mexico at the age of three. He had been injured after a car crash with a tree in January 2011, and was investigated by authorities for driving without a license, a minor infraction; illegal immigrants were not permitted to hold driver's licenses at the time. Donnelly called for Ramirez's removal, saying that the "This issue is about breaking the law and driving without a license." Donnelly was heckled by students at the hearing.

=== Anti-vaccine activities ===
In September 2012, Donnelly spoke at an anti-vaccine movement "Medical Freedom Rally" with actor Rob Schneider, urging Governor Jerry Brown to veto AB 2109, legislation that required parents seeking an exemption for vaccination of their children "to first talk with a health care provider about the risks and benefits of vaccines." The legislation aimed to encourage vaccination and improve vaccination rates in the state. (The legislation retained the ability of parents to reject vaccination for their child on the basis of "personal belief.") Brown signed the bill into law, although he added a signing statement indication that parents "whose religious beliefs preclude vaccination" should not be unduly burdened.

In 2015, after outbreaks of whooping cough and measles the previous year, Governor Brown signed into law SB 277, a mandatory vaccination law that eliminated the "personal belief" exemption from school vaccination requirements, leaving a physician-granted medical exemption as the only exemption from vaccination requirements. One day after Brown signed the bill into law, Donnelly—who by this point had left the state legislature and become a conservative talk radio host—filed paperwork to begin signature-gathering in an attempt to place a referendum on the November 2016 California ballot to reverse the legislation. Donnelly characterized the issue as government intrusion on parental rights, and said that concerned over what he claimed was "the inherent risks of an ever increasing schedule of vaccinations," although scientific evidence shows that vaccines are safe and effective. Donnelly's referendum failed to make the ballot, having collected well under the required number of signatures.

=== Audit of Child Protective Services ===
Donnelly called for an audit of California's Child Protective Services along with Assemblyman Mike Gatto, following the case of Sammy Nikolayev, who was removed from his parents' home after his parents wanted a second opinion regarding medical treatment. The Joint Legislative Audit Committee voted unanimously to audit CPS in three counties in the state of California on June 5.

=== Liberty Preservation Act ===
In 2013, Donnelly authored AB 351, the "Liberty Preservation Act." The law prevents "local entities from knowingly using state funds ... to engage in any activity that aids an agency of the Armed Forces of the United States in the detention of any person within California for purposes of implementing Sections 1021" of the National Defense Authorization Act for Fiscal Year 2012. The bill achieved overwhelming, bipartisan support in the California Legislature, and was signed into law by Governor Jerry Brown. The Liberty Preservation Act prevents any state agency from indefinitely detaining American citizens. Donnelly stated, "Indefinite detention, by its very definition, means we are throwing away the basic foundations of our Constitution." He added, AB 351 "will prevent California from implementing indefinite detention for any reason."

=== Conviction for airport gun incident ===
On January 4, 2012, Donnelly had a loaded Colt handgun while attempting to board an airplane at Ontario International Airport. TSA security screeners discovered the gun in his carry-on luggage. The gun was not registered to Donnelly. Donnelly said the incident was a "regrettable" and "innocent and honest mistake." In March 2012, following a plea bargain with prosecutors, Donnelly pleaded no contest to two misdemeanor offenses: one count of carrying a loaded firearm into a city without a concealed weapons permit and one count of possession of a prohibited item in a sterile area. He was sentenced to three years of probation, a $2,215 fine, and is prohibited from using, owning or possessing any firearm that is not registered to him.

=== "Hispanic insurgency" speech ===
A 2006 speech by Tim Donnelly surfaced in April 2014, in which Donnelly referred to a "Hispanic insurgency" which he compared to the war in Iraq. The speech drew strong rebuke from former U.S. Treasurer Rosario Marin, who said "I am just appalled. It's an embarrassment not only to himself but to the party and the efforts I am involved in at the national level … to elect Latino Republicans. This … makes my job that much more difficult." Primary Republican opponent Neel Kashkari reacted with a statement, ""Once again Assemblyman Donnelly's comments are outrageous and divisive. This is not who we are as Republicans and is not who we are as Californians. We need positive leadership that unites us to tackle the serious challenges that California families face."

=== 2014 campaign for governor ===
In January 2013, Donnelly announced his bid for governor of California. Donnelly was endorsed by Hollywood actor Rob Schneider.

In May 2014, during his campaign, a Donnelly campaign associate posted comments on Donnelly's official campaign Facebook page claiming that his Republican primary opponent Neel Kashkari had "supported the United States submitting to the Islamic, Shariah banking code in 2008" when Kashkari served as Under Secretary of the Treasury and administered the 2008 bank bailout. Donnelly's claim drew swift rebukes from other Republicans and Muslim groups. Representative Darrell Issa, Republican of California, said: "As far as I'm concerned, this type of stupidity disqualifies Tim Donnelly from being fit to hold any office, anywhere. California Republican Party vice chair Harmeet Dhillon said that Donnelly's attempt to tie Kashkari (a Hindu of Indian descent) to Islamic law was an attempt "to trade on bigotry, racism, hatred of the other, hysteria." The California chapter of the Council on American–Islamic Relations condemned Donnelly's anti-Muslim comments and said, "It is a shame that an elected official uses xenophobic and anti-Muslim rhetoric to discredit a member of his own party." Donnelly stood by his remarks.

In the June 2014 California open primary, Democratic incumbent Jerry Brown won with 54.5% of the vote and Republican Neel Kashkari came in second with 19.0% of the vote, qualifying for the general election. Donnelly came in third with 14.8% of the vote. Although Kashkari called for Republican unity, Donnelly pointedly refused to ask his supporters to support Kashkari. Brown subsequently won the general election.

=== False Obama smears ===
In 2015, Donnelly claimed that President Barack Obama was "secretly following" Islam and that he wanted to see the United States punished. Donnelly referred to Obama as "Ayatollah Obama". He pushed the conspiracy theory that the Obama administration is staffed with Muslim Brotherhood members, saying that he was starting to believe "more and more" that Obama himself was a member of the Muslim Brotherhood.

=== 2016 congressional campaign ===
In 2016, Donnelly ran for California's 8th congressional district against incumbent Republican Paul Cook. He finished third in the blanket primary behind Cook and Democrat Rita Ramirez, with 20.7% of the vote, thereby failing to advance to the general election.

=== 2018 congressional campaign ===
Donnelly ran again for the 8th district in 2018. He emphasized support for President Donald Trump, and advocates for a wall to be built along the Mexico–United States border. He also supports repealing the Patient Protection and Affordable Care Act, ending mandatory vaccinations, and originalism. During his campaign announcement in October 2017, Donnelly criticized members of Congress for their alleged failure to support the agenda of President Trump. He finished second in the blanket primary behind incumbent Paul Cook and advanced to the general election for a Republican vs. Republican battle. Cook defeated Donnelly in the general election.

=== 2020 congressional campaign ===
In 2019, incumbent Republican Paul Cook announced that he will run for the San Bernardino County Board of Supervisors in 2020 rather than seek reelection. Donnelly announced that he would be a candidate for the 8th district. He ran on the same issues he emphasized in the last two campaigns he waged. Donnelly came third in the blanket primary, behind Republican Jay Obernolte and Democrat Christine Bubser, thereby failing to advance to the general election.

== Television appearances ==
On June 21, 2007, Donnelly appeared on The Colbert Report. In a satirical segment entitled Difference Makers, Donnelly and his Minutemen group were videotaped building a small fence along the United States border with Mexico.

On December 5, 2011, Donnelly was interviewed by John Oliver, a correspondent for The Daily Show with Jon Stewart in an appearance where he discussed California's budget shortfalls along with former state Senator John L. Burton, the chairman of the California Democratic Party regarding direct democracy in California.
