= Anaheim City Council =

Municipal legislature of Anaheim, California

Type
- Type: Unicameral
- Term limits: 2 terms

Leadership
- Mayor: Ashleigh Aitken, Democratic since December 6, 2022
- Mayor Pro Tem: Carlos Leon, Democratic since January 1, 2026

Structure
- Seats: 7
- Political groups: Officially nonpartisan: Democratic (5); Republican (1); Independent (1)
- Length of term: 4 years

Elections
- Voting system: Single-member districts
- Last election: November 5, 2024
- Next election: November 3, 2026

Meeting place
- Anaheim City Hall; 200 S Anaheim Blvd, Anaheim, CA 92805

Website
- Official Website

The Anaheim City Council is the legislative branch of government for the city of Anaheim, California.

== Structure ==
The city council is made up of the mayor, who is elected at-large, and six city council members who are elected by-district. Both the mayor and city council members serve four-year terms. All are limited to two consecutive terms, and a person who serves one term as a councilmember followed immediately by one term as mayor is considered to have served two consecutive terms under the term limits provision of the Anaheim city charter.

Anaheim has a council–manager government, in which the council appoints a city manager to oversee the administrative operations of the city, implement the council's policies, and advise the council.

The most recent general election was held in November 2024 for council districts 1, 4, and 5; the next elections for these seats will be held in 2028 General elections. The most recent general election for Mayor and council districts 2, 3, and 6 was last held in November 2022; the next election for these seats will be in 2026. The mayor and city council seats are all officially non-partisan by state law, although most members have a party preference.

== Current members ==
The mayor is presiding officer of the city council and elected at-large. The other members of the city council are elected from single-member districts and currently includes Councilmembers Ryan Balius, Carlos A. Leon, Natalie Rubalcava, Norma Campos Kurtz, Kristen M. Maahs, and Natalie Meeks. The City of Anaheim has a detailed map of council districts on its website.

| District | Councilmember | Party (officially nonpartisan) | Entered office | Next election |
|---|---|---|---|---|
| Mayor | Ashleigh Aitken | Democratic | 2022 | 2026 |
| 1 | Ryan Balius | Independent | 2024 | 2028 |
| 2 | Carlos A. Leon | Democratic | 2022 | 2026 |
| 3 | Natalie Rubalcava | Democratic | 2022 | 2026 |
| 4 | Norma Campos Kurtz | Democratic | 2023 | 2028 |
| 5 | Kristen M. Maahs | Democratic | 2024 | 2028 |
| 6 | Natalie Meeks | Republican | 2022 | 2026 |

== See also ==
- List of mayors of Anaheim, California
