= List of mayors of Anaheim, California =

Mayor of Anaheim
- Seal of Anaheim

- Flag of Anaheim

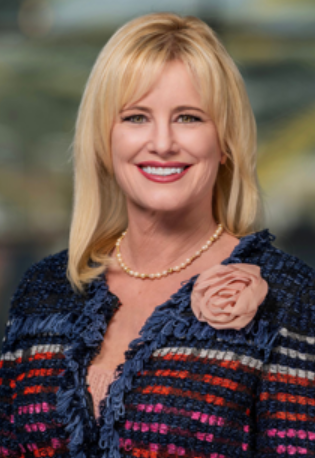
- Incumbent; Ashleigh Aitken since December 6, 2022
- Term length: 4 years
- Formation: 1870
- First holder: Max Strobel

Below is a list of mayors of Anaheim, California since its incorporation in 1870.

#	Image	Name	Took office	Left office
Mayors of the City of Anaheim; The City of Anaheim was incorporated by act of the California State Legislature on February 10, 1870.
1		Max Strobel	1870	1871
2		Henry Kroeger	1871	1872
Presidents of the Town of Anaheim; The charter of the City of Anaheim was revoked by act of the California State Legislature on March 7, 1872. The Town of Anaheim was incorporated on December 6, 1876 by act of the Legislature.
3		John Fischer	1876	1877
4		Theodore Reiser	1877	1878
5		L. W. Kirby	1878	1879
6		B. F. Seibert	1879	1881
7		B. Dreyfus	1881	1883
8		J. P. Zeyn	1883	1884
9		F. A. Korn	1884	1885
10		R. J. Northam	1885	1887
11		A. Rimpau	1887	1888
12		Frank Ey	1888	1888
Presidents of the City of Anaheim; The Town of Anaheim was reorganized as the City of Anaheim after an Act of the California State Legislature on March 13, 1883, and approval by Anaheim voters on June 4, 1888.
		Frank Ey	1888	1890
13		Theodore Reiser	1890	1892
14		W. A. Witte	1892	1894
15		Charles O. Rust	1894	1900
16		Joseph Helmson	1900	1902
17		Julius J. Schneider	1902	1904
18		Charles O. Rust	1904	1912
19		Max Nebelung	1912	1914
20		John H. Cook	1914	1916
21		Julius J. Schneider	1916	1918
22		John J. Dwyer	1918	1920
23		William Stark	1920	1924
24		Elmer H. Metcalf	1924	1925^{1}
25		Perry W. Mathis	1925	1927^{2}
26		Carl F. Leonard	1927	1928
27		Louis E. Miller	1928	1930
Mayors of the City of Anaheim; The post of President of the City of Anaheim was renamed Mayor of the City of Anaheim, effective with the 1930 municipal elections.
		Louis E. Miller	1930	1932
28		Fred H. Koesel	1932	1934
29		Charles H. Mann	1934	1940
30		Charles A. Pearson	1940	1959^{2}
31		A. J. Schutte	1959	1962
32		Rector L. Coons	1962	1964
33		Odra Chandler	1964	1965
34		Fred T. Krein	1965	1968
35		Cal Pebley	1968	1969
36		Ralph B. Clark	1969	1970
37		Jack Dutton	1970	1976
38		W. J. "Bill" Thom	1976	1978
39		John Seymour	1978	1982
40		Don Roth	1982	1986
41		Ben Bay	1986	1988
42		Fred Hunter	1988	1992
43		Tom Daly	1992	2002
44		Curt Pringle	2002	2010
45		Tom Tait	2010	2018
46		Harry Sidhu	2018	2022^{2}
47		Ashleigh Aitken	2022	Present

== See also ==
- Timeline of Anaheim, California

== Notes ==
- ^{1. E. H. Metcalf was recalled by the voters of the City of Anaheim on February 3, 1925.}
- ^{2. Resigned.}
