= Bruce Young =

Bruce Young may refer to:

- Bruce Young (American football), former American football coach
- Bruce Young (politician), Australian Liberal National politician
- Bruce A. Young (born 1956), American television, film, and stage actor
- Bruce E. Young (1946–2022), a California State Assemblymember
- Bruce W. Young (born 1950), American essayist and author
- Bruce Young (police officer) (1888–1952), New Zealand baker, policeman, unionist and police commissioner
