= Marion W. La Follette =

American politician (1926–2022)

Marian W. La Follette

Member of the California State Assembly from the 38th district
- In office December 1, 1980 – November 30, 1990
- Preceded by: Robert M. McLennan
- Succeeded by: Paula Boland

Personal details
- Born: September 19, 1926 Van Nuys, California, U.S.
- Died: December 23, 2022 (aged 96) Newport Beach, California, U.S.
- Party: Republican
- Spouse: John Travis (m. ?–1990; his death)
- Children: 4
- Occupation: Businesswoman, teacher

Marian W. La Follette (September 19, 1926 – December 23, 2022) was an American politician from California and a member of the Republican party.

== Early career ==
La Follette began her political career in the 1960s as an aide to then Los Angeles Mayor Sam Yorty. In 1969 she won a seat on the Los Angeles Community College Board of Trustees. She was a candidate for state controller in 1974 but lost in the Republican primary. In 1975 she was defeated for reelection to the college board by Ira Reiner, who would later become Los Angeles District Attorney.

La Follette joined the Los Angeles-based staff of newly elected U.S. Senator SI Hayakawa in 1977 and worked for him until 1980, when she ran for the legislature.

== State Assembly ==
La Follette won election to the 38th district in the California State Assembly, succeeding fellow Republican Paul V. Priolo. After the 1981 reapportionment, her district shifted entirely into the San Fernando Valley, forcing her to move from her Malibu home to Northridge.

Early in her first term she authored legislation that would have broken up the Los Angeles Unified School District creating an independent district for the San Fernando Valley. Though the legislation was unsuccessful, the public debate it ignited (on whether the LA district is too large) lasts to this day.

In 1986 La Follette made national headlines when she called for drug tests for California legislators. She also pushed for legislation to enact the death penalty for drug kingpins.

La Follette left the Assembly in 1990 to care for her ailing husband John Travis and endorsed her top aide, 24-year-old Rob Wilcox for the Republican nomination. Wilcox narrowly lost to realtor Paula Boland in the primary.

== Post legislature ==
La Follette moved to Newport Beach where her two sons lived. John Travis died in 1990 and she returned to public life in 1992, moving to Thousand Oaks to run for state senate.

== State senate race ==
The 19th State Senate District was being vacated by GOP stalwart Ed Davis, who had decided to retire. Davis, a former Los Angeles Police Chief, didn't much like the declared candidate for the seat, state assemblywoman Cathie Wright (whom he dubbed "The peroxide princess of Simi Valley"), so he openly recruited La Follette to run in the GOP primary (a decision Wright said was "out of spite"). Despite Davis' considerable backing, however, La Follette lost to Wright 38% to 33%.

== Later life and death ==
After her election loss, La Follette moved back to Newport Beach. She was subsequently appointed to the Orange County Fair Board by Governor Pete Wilson. In the mid-1990s, La Follette ran an inn in Downieville, California, which she credited with saving her life following her husband John Travis's death. She latterly split her time between Newport Beach and Northern California.

La Follette died in Newport Beach on December 23, 2022, at the age of 96.

Political offices
Preceded by Paul V. Priolo	California State Assembly, 38th District; December 1, 1980 – November 30, 1990	Succeeded by Paula Boland
