= McCollister =

McCollister is a surname. Notable people with the surname include:

- John S. McCollister (born 1947), American state politician
- John Y. McCollister (died 2013), American state and federal politician
- Richard H. McCollister (1908–1975), American state politician

== See also ==
- James McCollister Farmstead, a farmstead in Iowa City, Iowa, U.S.
