= Collister =

Collister is a surname. Notable people with the surname include:

- Christine Collister, Manx singer-songwriter
- Joe Collister (born 1991), English footballer
- Peter Lyons Collister, American cinematographer
- Teigan Collister (born 2000), Australian soccer player

== See also ==
- Collister School, a school in Boise, Idaho, United States
- McCollister, a surname
