= Sam L. Collins =

American politician (1895–1965)

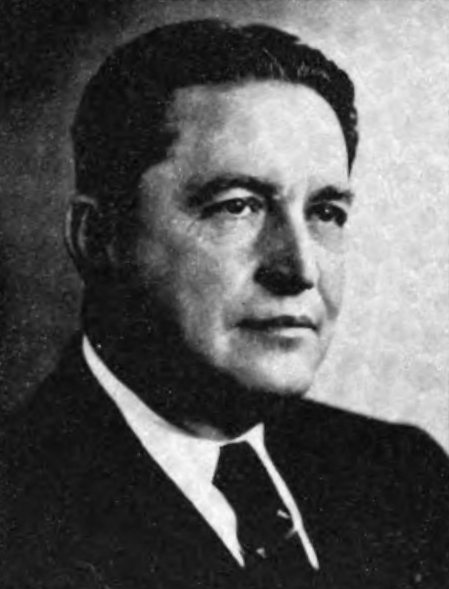
- Collins c. 1950

50th Speaker of the California State Assembly
- In office January 6, 1947 – August 13, 1952
- Preceded by: Charles W. Lyon
- Succeeded by: James W. Silliman

Majority Leader of the California Assembly
- In office 1943–1947
- Preceded by: Position established
- Succeeded by: Randal F. Dickey

Member of the California State Assembly from the 75th district
- In office January 6, 1941 – January 5, 1953
- Preceded by: Thomas Kuchel
- Succeeded by: LeRoy E. Lyon Jr.

Member of the U.S. House of Representatives from California's 19th district
- In office March 4, 1933 – January 3, 1937
- Preceded by: district created
- Succeeded by: Harry R. Sheppard

District Attorney of Orange County
- In office 1930–1932

Personal details
- Born: Samuel LaFort Collins; August 6, 1895 Fortville, Indiana
- Died: June 26, 1965 (aged 69) Fullerton, California
- Resting place: Loma Vista Memorial Park, Fullerton, California
- Party: Republican

Military service
- Allegiance: United States
- Branch/service: United States Army and California National Guard
- Battles/wars: World War I Pancho Villa Expedition

Samuel LaFort Collins (August 6, 1895 – June 26, 1965) was an American lawyer, World War I veteran, and Republican politician who served in various offices from California in the early 20th century.

== Early life and education ==
Collins was born in Fortville, Indiana, attended public schools in Indiana and California, and graduated from Chaffey Union High School, Ontario, California, in 1915.

He served as a private in the Hospital Corps, Seventh Infantry, California National Guard on the Mexican border in 1916.

== World War I service ==
From 1917 to 1919, he served in the United States Army overseas as a sergeant in Co. C, 364th Infantry, 91st Division. After discharge from the Army, Collins studied law, was admitted to the bar in 1921, and practiced in Fullerton, California.

== Legal career ==
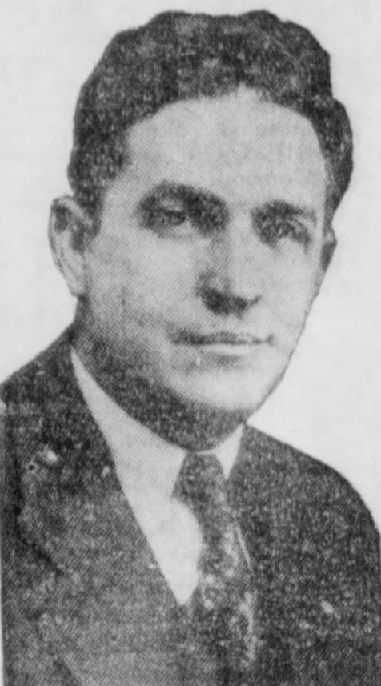
Collins as a Congressman.

He was assistant district attorney of Orange County, California, 1926–1930 and district attorney 1930–1932.

== Political career ==
In 1932 Collins was elected to the 73rd Congress, and reelected, serving from 1933 to 1937. He lost his bid for reelection to a third term in 1936.

Collins served as member of the California State Assembly for the 75th district from 1941 to 1953, serving as speaker 1947–1952. Collins was the longest-serving Speaker in California history until the record was broken by Jesse M. Unruh, who was speaker from 1961 to 1969. Collins is the fifth-longest-serving Speaker behind Leo T. McCarthy (1974–1980), Anthony Rendon (2016–2023), Unruh, and Willie Brown (1980–1995). Collins is the longest-serving Republican Speaker.

After serving in the Assembly, he resumed the practice of law.

== Death ==
Collins died at the age of 69 in Fullerton and is buried at Loma Vista Memorial Park.

== Electoral history ==
1932 United States House of Representatives elections
Party	Candidate	Votes	%
Republican	Sam L. Collins	56,889	51.0
Democratic	B. Z. McKinney	51,796	46.4
Liberty	Horatio S. Hoard	2,873	2.6
Total votes		111,558	100.0
Turnout			
Republican win (new seat)			

1934 United States House of Representatives elections
Party	Candidate	Votes	%
Republican	Sam L. Collins (Incumbent)	97,119	88.8
No party	A. B. Hillabold (write-in)	12,301	11.2
Total votes		109,420	100.0
Turnout			
Republican hold			

1936 United States House of Representatives elections in California
Party	Candidate	Votes	%
Democratic	Harry R. Sheppard	70,339	53.8
Republican	Sam L. Collins (Incumbent)	59,071	45.2
Communist	Charles McLauchlan	1,336	1.0
Total votes		130,746	100.0
Turnout			
Democratic gain from Republican			

U.S. House of Representatives
Preceded by District created	Member of the U.S. House of Representatives from California's 19th congressional district March 3, 1933 – January 3, 1937	Succeeded by Harry R. Sheppard
California Assembly
Preceded by Thomas Kuchel	California State Assemblyman, 75th District; January 6, 1941 – January 5, 1953	Succeeded by LeRoy E. Lyon Jr.
Political offices
Preceded by Charles W. Lyon	Speaker of the California State Assembly; January 1947 – August 1952	Succeeded by James W. Silliman
