= Trenton, Kansas =

Unincorporated community in Saline County, Kansas

- Unincorporated community
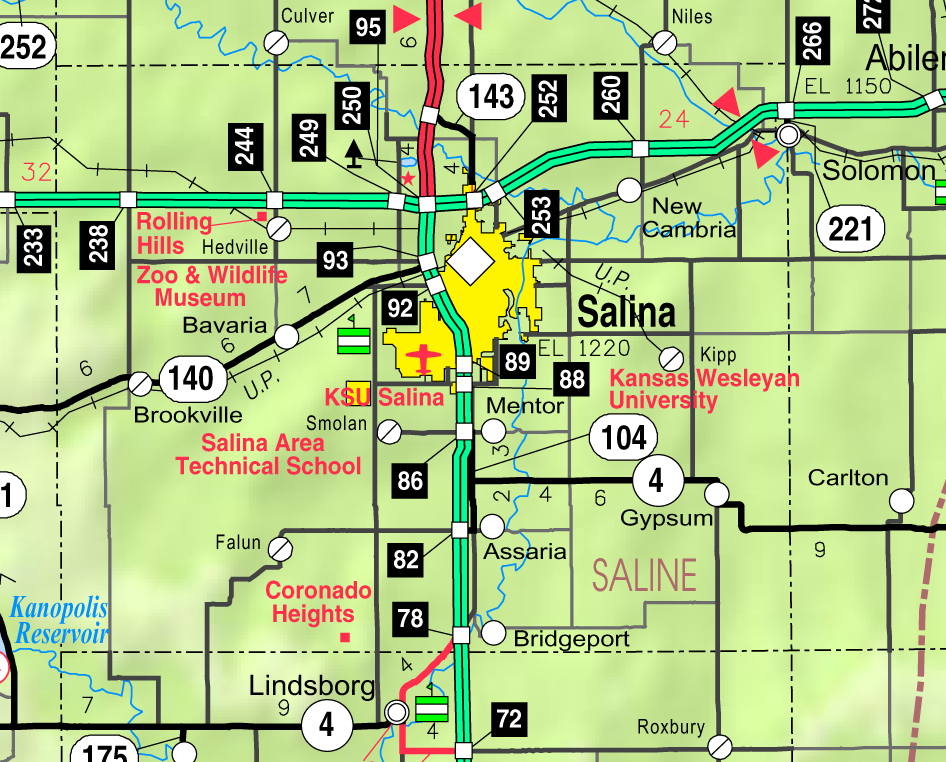
- KDOT map of Saline County (legend)

- Location within Kansas Location within the United States
- Coordinates: 38°53′13″N 97°38′57″W
- Country: United States
- State: Kansas
- County: Saline
- Elevation: 1,224 ft (373 m)
- Time zone: UTC-6 (CST)
  - Summer (DST): UTC-5 (CDT)
- Area code: 785
- FIPS code: 20-71425
- GNIS ID: 476631

Trenton is an unincorporated community in Saline County, Kansas, United States. It is located northwest of Salina at the intersection of Gerard Road and Pleasant Hill Road, next to an abandoned railroad.

== Education ==
The community is served by Salina USD 305 public school district.

== Notable people ==
- Randal F. Dickey (1899–1975), California state politician, was born in Trenton.
