= Paul V. Priolo =

American politician (1927–2018)

Minority Leader of the California Assembly
- In office 1976–1979
- Preceded by: Robert G. Beverly
- Succeeded by: Carol Boyd Hallett

Member of the California State Assembly
- In office December 2, 1974 - November 30, 1980
- Preceded by: Robert M. McLennan
- Succeeded by: Marion W. La Follette
- Constituency: 38th district
- In office January 2, 1967 - November 30, 1974
- Preceded by: Robert S. Stevens
- Succeeded by: Joseph B. Montoya
- Constituency: 60th district

Personal details
- Born: July 14, 1927 San Francisco, California
- Died: July 22, 2018 (aged 91) Sonoma, California
- Party: Republican
- Spouse(s): Anna Lee (m. ? - div. 1972); Beate Engel (m. 1978)
- Children: 3
- Profession: businessman

Military service
- Branch/service: United States Navy
- Battles/wars: World War II

Paul Vincent Priolo (July 14, 1927 – July 22, 2018) served in the California State Assembly for the 60th and 38th district from 1967 to 1980. During World War II he served in the United States Navy.

He sponsored the Alquist Priolo Special Studies Zone Act passed in 1972.
