= William A. Munnell =

American politician

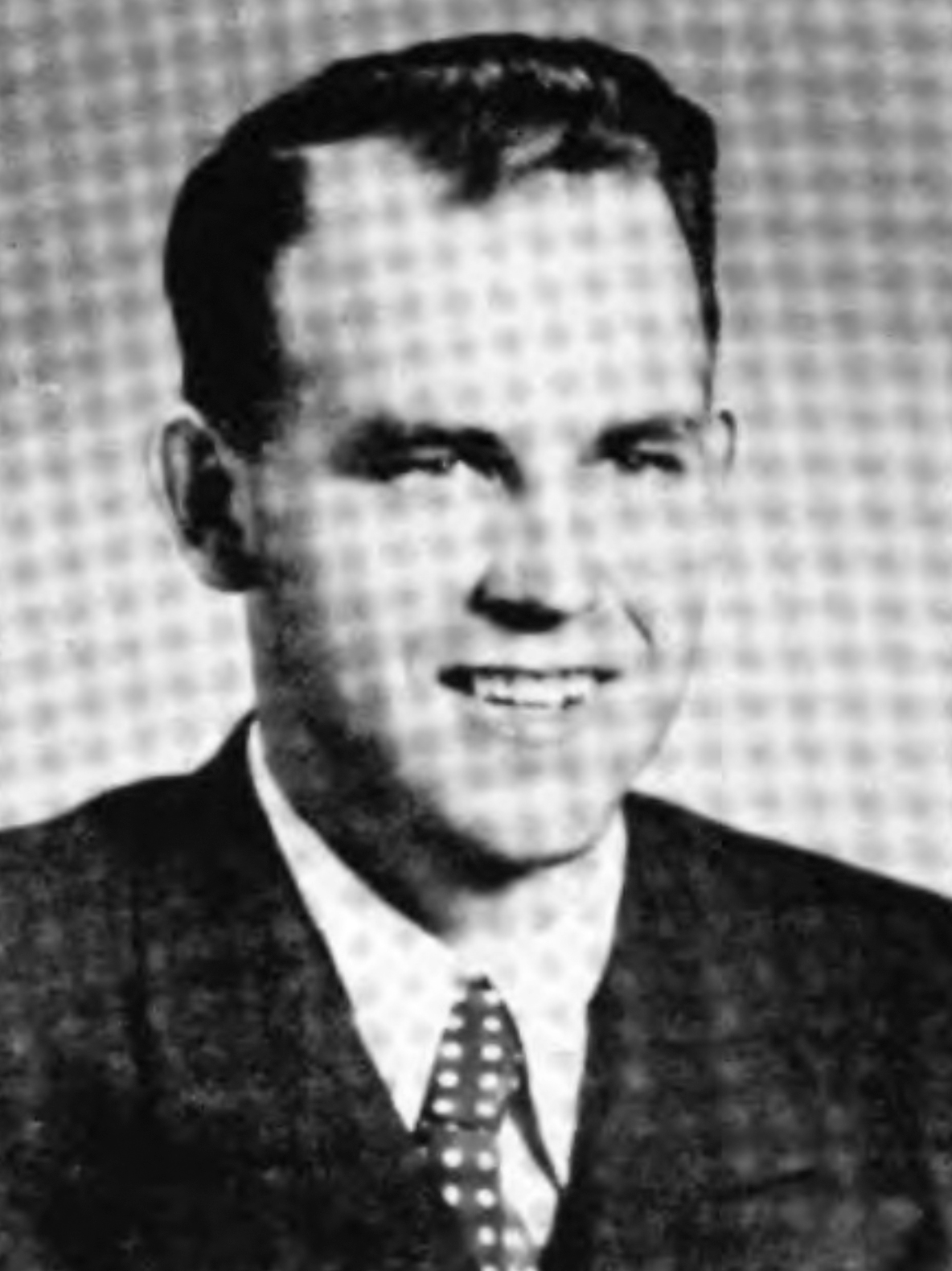

Settlement Judge for the Los Angeles County Superior Court
- In office 1982–1985

Justice for the Los Angeles County Superior Court
- In office 1961–1981
- Nominated by: Pat Brown

Majority Leader of the California Assembly
- In office 1959–1961
- Preceded by: Richard H. McCollister
- Succeeded by: Jerome Waldie

Minority Leader of the California Assembly
- In office 1957–1958
- Preceded by: Vincent Thomas
- Succeeded by: Joseph C. Shell

Member of the California State Assembly from the 51st district
- In office January 8, 1951 – November 30, 1961
- Preceded by: Elwyn S. Bennett
- Succeeded by: John Moreno

Personal details
- Born: October 9, 1920 Marshalltown, Iowa
- Died: March 1, 2013 (aged 92) Reno, Nevada
- Party: Democratic
- Spouse: Charlotte Hayduk (m. 1940)
- Children: 4
- Education: University of Southern California (JD) 1948

Military service
- Branch/service: United States Army
- Unit: Counter Intelligence Corps (Army CIC)
- Battles/wars: World War II

William Arthur Munnell (October 9, 1920 – March 1, 2013) was an American politician who served in the California State Assembly for the 51st district from 1951 to 1961 and during World War II he served in the United States Army. While serving in the California State Assembly he was at one point the minority and the majority leader for the Democratic Party. He also served on the Los Angeles County Superior Court from 1961 until 1985.
