= Richard H. McCollister =

American politician

Majority Leader of the California Assembly
- In office 1955–1958
- Preceded by: Harold K. Levering
- Succeeded by: William A. Munnell

Member of the California State Assembly from the 7th district
- In office January 6, 1941 – January 2, 1961
- Preceded by: Hubert B. Scudder
- Succeeded by: Bill Bagley

Personal details
- Born: August 17, 1908 San Mateo, California, U.S.
- Died: May 15, 1975 (aged 66)
- Party: Republican
- Spouse: Iris Richins
- Children: 1

Richard H. McCollister (August 17, 1908 – May 15, 1975) was a California politician who served in the California State Assembly from the 7th district as a Republican between 1941 and 1961. McCollister also served as the Assembly's majority leader between 1955 and 1958.

== Biography ==
McCollister was born in 1908 in San Mateo and then worked as a real estate agent in Mill Valley before being elected to the California State Assembly in 1940. He served in the Assembly until 1961, and served as the Assembly's majority leader between 1955 and 1958. In 1958, McCollister was sued for putting out campaign material with the phrase "fellow Democrats" despite McCollister himself being a Republican. The California First District Court of Appeal ruled that there was no statute prohibiting such political advertisement and did not want to intervene.

While in the Assembly, McCollister, along with Walter J. Fourt and R. Fred Price were responsible for a bill which allowed prisoners to be paroled to serve in the U.S. military during World War II. McCollister also authored a bill that would've allowed the state of California to purchase and operate the Golden Gate Bridge.

He died in 1975.
