= Jack T. Casey =

American politician

Member of the California State Assembly from the 28th district
- In office January 7, 1963 – January 2, 1967
- Preceded by: Clark L. Bradley
- Succeeded by: Kent H. Stacey

Member of the California State Assembly from the 38th district
- In office January 2, 1961 – January 7, 1963
- Preceded by: Dorothy M. Donahoe
- Succeeded by: Carley V. Porter

Personal details
- Born: January 2, 1909 San Francisco, California, U.S.
- Died: March 12, 1974 (aged 65) Orange County, California, U.S.
- Party: Democratic
- Spouse: Ruth N. McNaughton (after 1935)
- Children: Sharon Marie

Jack Tull Casey (January 2, 1909 - March 12, 1974) was a member of the California State Assembly for the 38th District. He was a member of the Education Committee. During his one term in the Assembly he authored the state's Medi-Cal legislation.

In the 1960s the 38th district represented parts of Bakersfield, California. Casey attended a speech by then-Senator John F. Kennedy at the Bakersfield Airport in 1960.

== Personal life ==
Casey was married to Ruth N. McNaughton in 1935 and had one child, Sharon Marie. According to Political Graveyard, Casey was a Member of Native Sons of the Golden West, the Freemasons, and the American Association of University Professors.
