= Willard M. Huyck =

American politician (1917–2018)

Member of the California State Assembly from the 59th district
- In office January 6, 1947 - January 8, 1951
- Preceded by: Charles W. Lyon
- Succeeded by: Charles W. Lyon

Personal details
- Born: January 11, 1917 San Bernardino, California, U.S.
- Died: November 3, 2018 (aged 101) Los Angeles, California, U.S.
- Party: Republican
- Spouse: Caramae A. Anderson (m. 1943)
- Children: Willard Huyck; James Forrest

Military service
- Branch/service: United States Army
- Battles/wars: World War II

Willard Miller Huyck Sr. (January 11, 1917 – November 3, 2018) was an American politician who served in the California State Assembly for the 59th district from 1947 to 1951 and during World War II he served in the United States Army.

Huyck died on November 3, 2018, at the age of 101. His son is the screenwriter, director and producer Willard Huyck.
