= California's 63rd State Assembly district =

American legislative district

Current assemblymember
Natasha Johnson; R–Lake Elsinore
- Population (2010) • Voting age • Citizen voting age: 461,153; 319,486; 206,962
- Demographics: 11.13% White; 7.42% Black; 74.20% Latino; 5.71% Asian; 0.29% Native American; 0.66% Hawaiian/Pacific Islander; 0.21% other; 0.39% remainder of multiracial
- Registered voters: 207,037
- Registration: 56.97% Democratic; 14.26% Republican; 24.24% No party preference

California's 63rd State Assembly district is one of 80 California State Assembly districts. The district is represented by Republican Natasha Johnson, who won a special election on August 26, 2025, to fill the vacancy created by Bill Essayli's resignation. Johnson was sworn into office on September 8, 2025.

== District profile ==
District map (2012 - 2022)

The district currently represents the southwestern part of the Inland Empire and is centered around Corona and its sphere of influence, including half of the city of Corona itself, surrounding suburban cities, and other cities further down the I-15, as well as a small part of Riverside.

Riverside County - partial

- Canyon Lake
- Corona - partial
- Eastvale - partial
- Lake Elsinore - partial
- Menifee
- Norco
- Riverside - partial

== Election results from statewide races ==
Year	Office	Results
2021	Recall	No 72.6 – 27.4%
2020	President	Biden 72.0 – 23.7%
2018	Governor	Newsom 74.6 – 25.4%
2018	Senator	Feinstein 54.3 – 45.7%
2016	President	Clinton 77.4 – 17.4%
2016	Senator	Harris 54.4 – 45.6%
2014	Governor	Brown 70.1 – 29.9%
2012	President	Obama 76.1 – 21.7%
2012	Senator	Feinstein 76.8 – 23.2%

== List of assembly members representing the district ==
Due to redistricting, the 63rd district has been moved around different parts of the state. The current iteration resulted from the 2021 redistricting by the California Citizens Redistricting Commission.

Assembly members	Party	Years served	Counties represented	Notes
William T. Patterson	Republican	January 5, 1885 – January 3, 1887	Santa Clara	
Isaiah Alonzo Wilcox	Republican	January 3, 1887 – January 7, 1889	Santa Clara	
Philo Hersey	Republican	January 7, 1889 – January 5, 1891	Santa Clara	
Edwin Elom Dow	Democratic	January 5, 1891 – January 2, 1893	Santa Clara	
H. J. T. Jacobsen	Republican	January 2, 1893 – January 7, 1895	Fresno	
William Franklin Rowell	Republican	January 7, 1895 – January 4, 1897	Fresno	
L. W. Moultrie	Fusion	January 4, 1897 – January 2, 1899	Fresno, Madera	
John Fairweather	Democratic	January 2, 1899 – January 1, 1901	Fresno, Madera	
Marvin Simpson	Democratic	January 1, 1901 – January 5, 1903	Fresno, Madera	
Warren M. John	Republican	January 5, 1903 – January 4, 1909	San Luis Obispo	
Oscar Gibbons	Democratic	January 4, 1909 – January 2, 1911	San Luis Obispo	
John F. Beckett	Republican	January 2, 1911 – January 6, 1913	San Luis Obispo	
Henry S. Benedict	Republican	January 6, 1913 – January 4, 1915	Los Angeles	
Alfred L. Bartlett	Republican	January 4, 1915 – January 6, 1919	Los Angeles	
Sidney Graves	Republican	January 6, 1919 – January 3, 1927	Los Angeles	
Clare Woolwine	Republican	January 3, 1927 – January 5, 1931	Los Angeles	
Emory J. Arnold	Republican	January 5, 1931 – January 2, 1933	Los Angeles	
Willard E. Badham	Republican	January 2, 1933 – January 7, 1935	Los Angeles	
Ralph Lewis Welsh	Democratic	January 7, 1935 – January 2, 1939	Los Angeles	
Don A. Allen	Democratic	January 2, 1939 – June 20, 1947	Los Angeles	Resigned from office to become member of the Los Angeles City Council.
Vacant		June 20, 1947 — November 25, 1947	Los Angeles	
G. Delbert Morris	Republican	November 25, 1947 – February 29, 1956	Los Angeles	Sworn in after winning special election. He resigned in 1956.
Vacant		February 29, 1956 — September 13, 1956	Los Angeles	
Don A. Allen	Democratic	September 13, 1956 – January 2, 1967	Los Angeles	Sworn in after winning back his old seat.
Yvonne Brathwaite Burke	Democratic	January 2, 1967 – January 3, 1973	Los Angeles	
Vacant		January 3, 1973 – January 8, 1973	Los Angeles	
Julian Dixon	Democratic	January 8, 1973 – November 30, 1974	Los Angeles	
Robert M. McLennan	Republican	December 2, 1974 – November 30, 1976	Los Angeles	
Bruce E. Young	Democratic	December 6, 1976 – November 30, 1984	Los Angeles	
Wayne R. Grisham	Republican	December 3, 1984 – November 30, 1988	Los Angeles	
Bob Epple	Democratic	December 5, 1988 – November 30, 1992	Los Angeles	
Jim Brulte	Republican	December 7, 1992 – November 30, 1996	San Bernardino	
Bill Leonard	Republican	December 2, 1996 – November 30, 2002	San Bernardino	
Robert Dutton	Republican	December 2, 2002 – November 30, 2004	San Bernardino, Riverside	
Bill Emmerson	Republican	December 6, 2004 – June 9, 2010	San Bernardino, Riverside	Resigned after being elected to represent the 37th State Senate district.
Vacant		June 9, 2010 — December 6, 2010	San Bernardino, Riverside	
Mike Morrell	Republican	December 6, 2010 – November 30, 2012	San Bernardino, Riverside	
Anthony Rendon	Democratic	December 3, 2012 – November 30, 2022	Los Angeles	
Bill Essayli	Republican	December 5, 2022 — April 2, 2025	Riverside	Resigned after being appointed as an interim U.S. attorney.
Vacant		April 2, 2025 — September 8, 2025	Riverside	
Natasha Johnson	Republican	September 8, 2025 — present	Riverside	Was sworn in after winning special election.

== Election results (1990–present) ==
=== 2025 (special) ===
2025 California State Assembly 63rd district special election Vacancy resulting from the resignation of Bill Essayli
Primary election
Party	Candidate	Votes	%
Republican	Natasha Johnson	26,735	46.2
Democratic	Chris Shoults	25,557	44.1
Republican	Vincent Romo	4,881	8.4
Libertarian	Zachary T. Consalvo	756	1.3
American Independent	Maricar Payad (write-in)	1	0.0
Total votes		57,930	100.0
General election
Republican	Natasha Johnson	34,866	53.5
Democratic	Chris Shoults	30,332	46.5
Total votes		64,991	100.0
Republican hold			

=== 2024 ===
2024 California State Assembly 63rd district election
Primary election
Party	Candidate	Votes	%
Republican	Bill Essayli (incumbent)	54,295	60.5
Democratic	Chris Shoults	32,708	36.4
No party preference	Orlando Munguia	2,735	3.0
Total votes		89,738	100.0
General election
Republican	Bill Essayli (incumbent)	122,968	57.3
Democratic	Chris Shoults	91,708	42.7
Total votes		214,676	100.0
Republican hold			

=== 2022 ===
2022 California State Assembly 63rd district election
Primary election
Party	Candidate	Votes	%
Democratic	Fauzia Rizvi	33,456	40.0
Republican	Bill Essayli	28,659	34.2
Republican	Clint Lorimore	21,598	25.8
Total votes		83,713	100.0
General election
Republican	Bill Essayli	82,613	58.6
Democratic	Fauzia Rizvi	58,346	41.4
Total votes		140,959	100.0
Republican gain from Democratic			

=== 2020 ===
2020 California State Assembly 63rd district election
Primary election
Party	Candidate	Votes	%
Democratic	Anthony Rendon (incumbent)	32,471	58.0
Democratic	Maria D. Estrada	23,481	42.0
Total votes		55,952	100.0
General election
Democratic	Anthony Rendon (incumbent)	71,460	53.7
Democratic	Maria D. Estrada	61,611	46.3
Total votes		133,071	100.0
Democratic hold			

=== 2018 ===
2018 California State Assembly 63rd district election
Primary election
Party	Candidate	Votes	%
Democratic	Anthony Rendon (incumbent)	18,047	46.6
Democratic	Maria D. Estrada	11,252	29.1
Republican	Adam Joshua Miller	9,419	24.3
Total votes		38,718	100.0
General election
Democratic	Anthony Rendon (incumbent)	49,367	54.3
Democratic	Maria D. Estrada	41,626	45.7
Total votes		90,993	100.0
Democratic hold			

=== 2016 ===
2016 California State Assembly 63rd district election
Primary election
Party	Candidate	Votes	%
Democratic	Anthony Rendon (incumbent)	45,391	78.5
Republican	Adam Joshua Miller	12,419	21.5
Total votes		57,810	100.0
General election
Democratic	Anthony Rendon (incumbent)	89,134	77.6
Republican	Adam Joshua Miller	25,680	22.4
Total votes		114,814	100.0
Democratic hold			

=== 2014 ===
2014 California State Assembly 63rd district election
Primary election
Party	Candidate	Votes	%
Democratic	Anthony Rendon (incumbent)	12,089	64.7
Republican	Adam J. Miller	6,597	35.3
Total votes		18,686	100.0
General election
Democratic	Anthony Rendon (incumbent)	28,544	69.1
Republican	Adam J. Miller	12,781	30.9
Total votes		41,325	100.0
Democratic hold			

=== 2012 ===
2012 California State Assembly 63rd district election
Primary election
Party	Candidate	Votes	%
Democratic	Anthony Rendon	8,776	38.0
Republican	Jack M. Guerrero	7,017	30.4
Democratic	Diane Janet Martinez	5,833	25.3
Democratic	Cathrin "Cat" Sargent	1,460	6.3
Total votes		23,086	100.0
General election
Democratic	Anthony Rendon	76,258	74.5
Republican	Jack M. Guerrero	26,093	25.5
Total votes		102,351	100.0
Democratic gain from Republican			

=== 2010 ===
2010 California State Assembly 63rd district election
Party	Candidate	Votes	%
Republican	Mike Morrell	72,866	58.1
Democratic	Renea Wickman	52,653	41.9
Total votes		125,519	100.0
Republican hold			

=== 2008 ===
2008 California State Assembly 63rd district election
Party	Candidate	Votes	%
Republican	Bill Emmerson (incumbent)	90,213	54.4
Democratic	Mark Westwood	75,719	45.6
Total votes		165,932	100.0
Republican hold			

=== 2006 ===
2006 California State Assembly 63rd district election
Party	Candidate	Votes	%
Republican	Bill Emmerson (incumbent)	59,340	59.9
Democratic	Mark Westwood	39,655	40.1
Total votes		98,995	100.0
Republican hold			

=== 2004 ===
2004 California State Assembly 63rd district election
Party	Candidate	Votes	%
Republican	Bill Emmerson	83,719	58.3
Democratic	D'Andre McNamee	49,646	34.5
Libertarian	Maureen K. Keedy	10,334	7.2
Total votes		143,699	100.0
Republican hold			

=== 2002 ===
2002 California State Assembly 63rd district election
Party	Candidate	Votes	%
Republican	Robert Dutton	49,480	61.0
Democratic	Doris Wallace	31,759	39.0
Total votes		81,239	100.0
Republican hold			

=== 2000 ===
2000 California State Assembly 63rd district election
Party	Candidate	Votes	%
Republican	Bill Leonard (incumbent)	79,896	58.3
Democratic	Scott Thomas Stotz	51,548	37.6
Libertarian	Ethel Mohler	5,603	4.1
Total votes		137,047	100.0
Republican hold			

=== 1998 ===
1998 California State Assembly 63rd district election
Party	Candidate	Votes	%
Republican	Bill Leonard (incumbent)	67,563	71.7
Libertarian	Maureen K. Lindberg	26,622	28.3
Total votes		94,185	100.0
Republican hold			

=== 1996 ===
1996 California State Assembly 63rd district election
Party	Candidate	Votes	%
Republican	Bill Leonard	78,351	62.8
Democratic	Wilma Strinati	46,365	37.2
Total votes		124,716	100.0
Republican hold			

=== 1994 ===
1994 California State Assembly 63rd district election
Party	Candidate	Votes	%
Republican	Jim Brulte (incumbent)	73,208	67.5
Democratic	Richard Edwards	35,217	32.5
Total votes		108,425	100.0
Republican hold			

=== 1992 ===
1992 California State Assembly 63rd district election
Party	Candidate	Votes	%
Republican	Jim Brulte (incumbent)	76,888	56.1
Democratic	A. L. "Larry" Westwood	42,860	31.3
Green	Joseph “Joe" M. Desist	17,413	12.7
Total votes		137,161	100.0
Republican gain from Democratic			

=== 1990 ===
1990 California State Assembly 63rd district election
Party	Candidate	Votes	%
Democratic	Bob Epple (incumbent)	36,728	59.6
Republican	Diane P. Boggs	24,888	40.4
Total votes		61,616	100.0
Democratic hold			

== See also ==
- California State Assembly
- California State Assembly districts
- Districts in California
