= Charles W. Lyon =

American politician

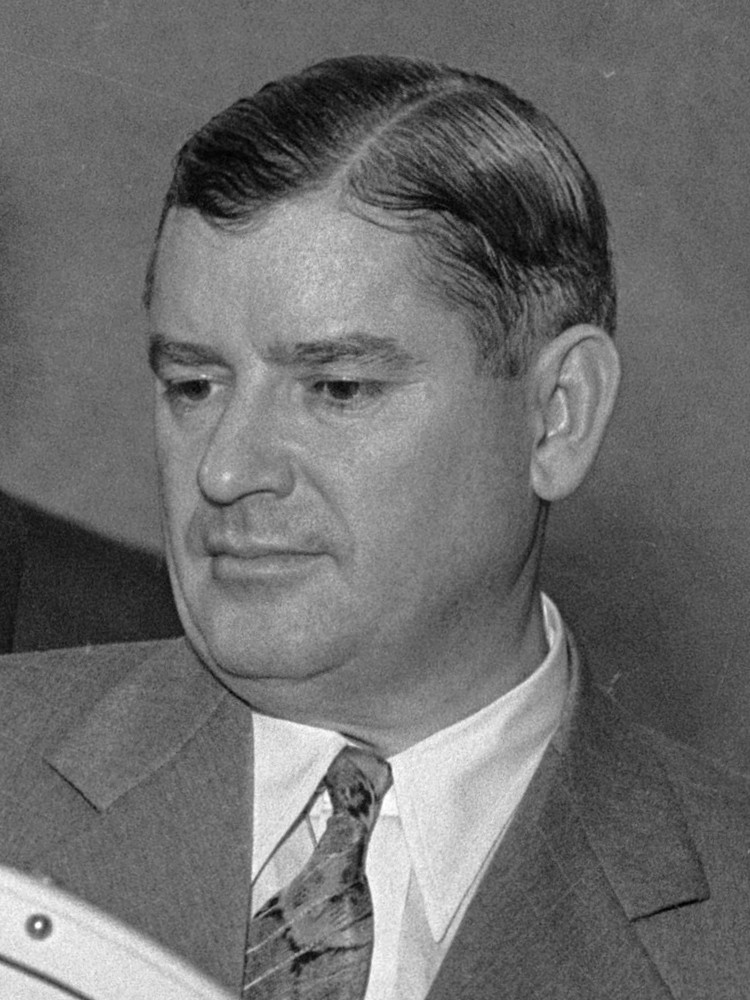
- Lyon in 1935

49th Speaker of the California State Assembly
- In office January 4, 1943 – July 25, 1946
- Preceded by: Gordon Hickman Garland
- Succeeded by: Sam L. Collins

Minority Leader of the California Assembly
- In office 1939–1943
- Preceded by: Position established
- Succeeded by: Alfred W. Robertson

Member of the California State Assembly
- In office January 8, 1951 – January 3, 1955
- Preceded by: Willard M. Huyck
- Succeeded by: Thomas M. Rees
- Constituency: 59th district
- In office January 2, 1933 – January 6, 1947
- Preceded by: Willard E. Badham
- Succeeded by: Willard M. Huyck
- In office January 4, 1915 – January 6, 1919
- Preceded by: Freeman H. Bloodgood
- Succeeded by: George R. Wickham
- Constituency: 62nd district

Member of the California Senate from the 34th district
- In office January 6, 1919 – January 5, 1931
- Preceded by: Henry S. Benedict
- Succeeded by: James I. Wagy

Personal details
- Born: Charles Wesley Lyon; September 13, 1887 Los Angeles, California, U.S.
- Died: July 20, 1960 (aged 72) Beverly Hills, California, U.S.
- Party: Republican
- Spouse: Nancy Janney
- Children: 3
- Profession: Lawyer

Charles Wesley Lyon (September 13, 1887 – July 20, 1960) was an American attorney from California who served as a Republican in the California State Assembly and the California State Senate. Lyon was Assembly Speaker from 1943 to 1946. Lyon was admitted to the bar in 1910 and was first elected to the Assembly in 1914. Lyon served numerous terms in the Senate and Assembly and authored the legislation creating the UCLA campus.

== Early life and career; fraternal activities ==
Lyon was born in Los Angeles on September 13, 1887. He was the eighth of nine children of James H. and Laura Emma (Simpson) Lyon, who had moved to California from Maine. The family was distantly related to John Alden and to Henry Wadsworth Longfellow. James Lyon was a carpenter foreman and architect. Charles attended the public schools in Los Angeles and San Francisco, then studied law at night while working for the Title Insurance and Trust Company in Los Angeles; he had begun working for the company at the age of fifteen. He was admitted to the California Bar at the age of 23 in 1910. He then went into private practice as a member of the firm of Fredericks & Hanna. He married Nancy Janney, daughter of a well known Utah mining engineer on September 21, 1912, and the couple had three children.

At age 21, Lyon was elected president of Los Angeles Parlor No. 45 of the Native Sons of the Golden West. Lyon became state president of the California State Aerie of the Fraternal Order of Eagles, which then had over thirty thousand members in California. In 1919, he was elected exalted ruler for 1919–20 of Santa Monica Elks Lodge.

== Political career ==
In 1914, Lyon became City Attorney of Venice, California, where he and his family were living as of 1921. Later that year, Lyon was elected to the California State Assembly as a Republican, and was reelected in 1916. While in the Assembly, he opposed the Populist reforms being enacted at that time. In 1918, he ran for the State Senate, and was elected. He remained in the Senate until defeated for re-election in 1930.

After two years out of office, Lyon ran for and was elected to the Assembly again, and served there until 1946. In the Assembly, he feared that Governor Frank Merriam would move to the left in response to the Depression, and actively opposed Merriam's Democratic successor, Culbert Olson.

While Lyon's 1938 re-election did not get any especial note at the time, it is remembered today because of the later careers of the opponents whom he defeated. Lyon cross-filed, running in both the Republican and Democratic primaries, and secured his re-election by defeating future Richard Nixon campaign manager Murray Chotiner in the Republican poll, and narrowly beating Robert A. Heinlein (who subsequently turned to writing science fiction) in the Democratic contest. Heinlein's political short story, "A Bathroom of Her Own" is based on Heinlein's own political experiences in the race against Lyon.

In 1939, Lyon became Assembly minority leader. The following year, during the special session, Republicans and conservative Democrats formed a ruling coalition, and Lyon became Chairman of the Rules Committee. The Republicans won a majority in the Assembly in 1942, and Lyon was elected Speaker the following year, a post he held for two terms. By this time, Republican Earl Warren had defeated Olson for reelection, and Lyon cooperated with Warren on such issues as postwar planning. In 1946, Lyon ran unsuccessfully for the position of Lieutenant Governor of California. In 1950, he recaptured a seat in the Assembly, and was reelected in 1952.

== Scandal and later life ==
Lyon's political career ended in scandal when, in 1954, he was convicted in connection with a liquor license bribery scheme in Southern California. Lyon was convicted of grand theft and conspiracy to commit grand theft. Lyon was paroled on November 5, 1956, after serving 18 months of a 5-year sentence at San Luis Obispo's Men's Colony. In 1958, he was pardoned by Governor Goodwin Knight. He spent his final years as a lobbyist for the Southern California Merchants Association.

Lyon died of cancer in July 1960, in Beverly Hills, California. In December 1961, Governor Edmund G. "Pat" Brown pardoned Lyon's fellow conspirator, former Assemblymember Delbert Morris.

Lyon is buried at Inglewood Park Cemetery.

California Assembly
Preceded by Freeman H. Bloodgood	California State Assemblyman, 62nd District; January 4, 1915 – January 6, 1919	Succeeded by George R. Wickham
Preceded by Willard M. Huyck	California State Assemblyman, 59th District; January 8, 1951 – January 3, 1955	Succeeded by Thomas M. Rees
California Senate
Preceded by Henry S. Benedict	California State Senator, 34th District; January 6, 1919 – January 5, 1931	Succeeded by James I. Wagy
Political offices
Preceded by Gordon Hickman Garland	Speaker of the California State Assembly; January 1947 – August 1952	Succeeded by Sam L. Collins
