= Bill Essayli =

American politician (born 1985)

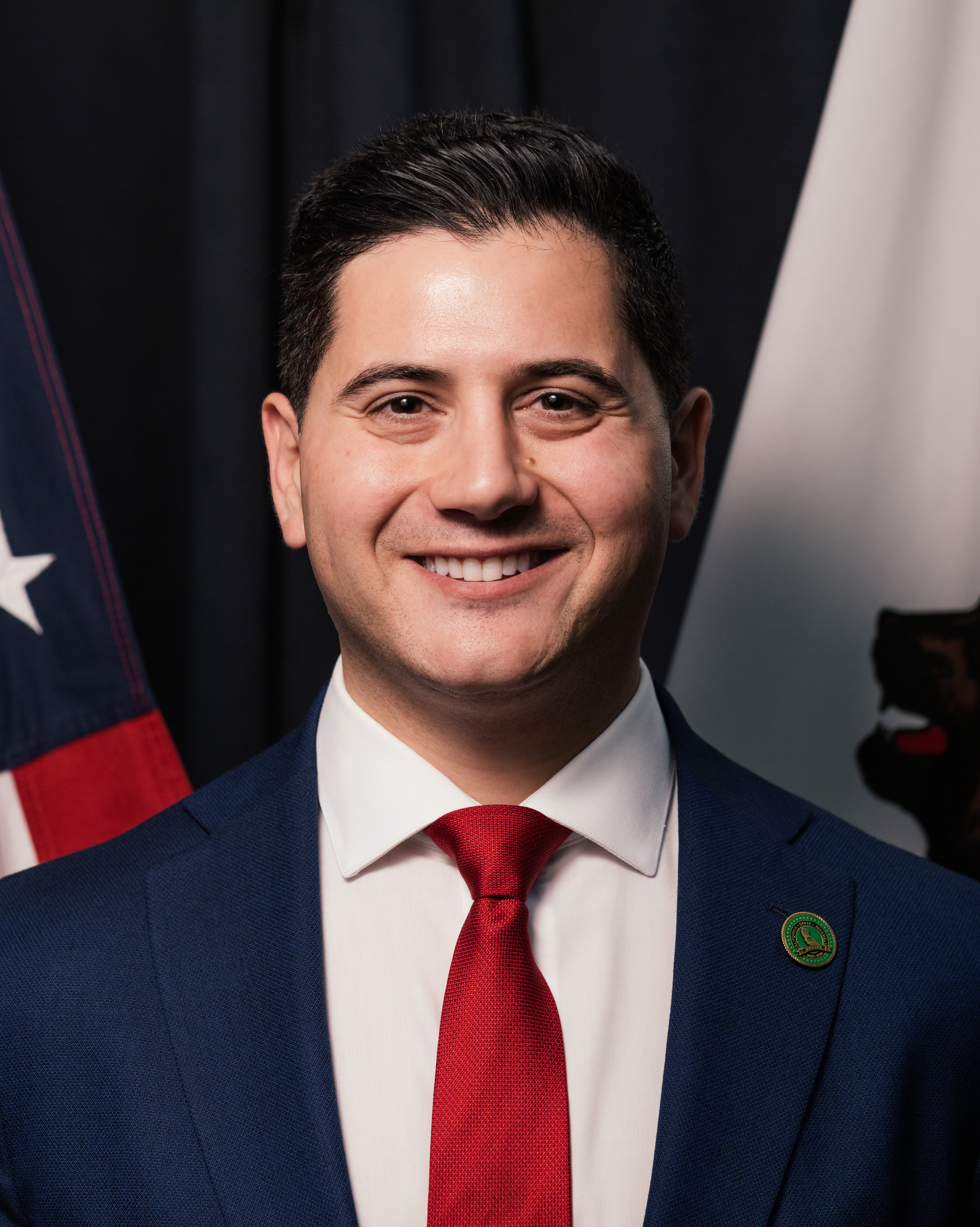
- Official portrait, 2024

First Assistant United States Attorney for the Central District of California
- Incumbent
- Assumed office October 29, 2025
- Preceded by: Joseph T. McNally

United States Attorney for the Central District of California
- Interim
- In office April 2, 2025 – July 29, 2025; Acting: July 30, 2025 – October 29, 2025
- Appointed by: Donald Trump
- Preceded by: E. Martin Estrada; Joseph T. McNally (acting)

Member of the California State Assembly from the 63rd district
- In office December 5, 2022 – April 1, 2025
- Preceded by: Anthony Rendon (redistricting)
- Succeeded by: Natasha Johnson

Personal details
- Born: Bilal Ali Essayli; November 24, 1985 (age 40) Corona, California
- Party: Republican
- Education: California State Polytechnic University, Pomona (BA); Chapman University (JD)

Bilal Ali "Bill" Essayli (born November 24, 1985) is an American lawyer and politician who currently serves as the first assistant United States attorney for the Central District of California. He previously served as the interim United States attorney for the Central District of California from April to July 2025. A federal judge ruled that he had illegally served as the acting US Attorney. Essayli was disqualified from holding the position because he stayed on beyond the initial interim period without having received official congressional approval, and was immediately reassigned to the First Assistant United States Attorney role.

Essayli served as a member of the California State Assembly from 2022 until 2025. A Republican, he was the first Muslim elected to the state assembly, where he represented the 63rd district, which includes Canyon Lake, Corona, Eastvale, Lake Elsinore, Menifee, Norco, Riverside, Temescal Valley, and Woodcrest.

== Early life and education ==
Essayli's parents are immigrants from Lebanon who fled to the United States to escape the Lebanese Civil War. He graduated from the public Centennial High School in Corona, California.

Essayli received a bachelor's degree from California State Polytechnic University, Pomona and a Juris Doctor degree from Chapman University.

== Early career ==
Essayli served as an intern in the White House Counsel's Office in 2008. He then worked in private practice, where he focused on employment law. Then he joined the Riverside County District Attorney's office as a prosecutor. He then became an Assistant United States Attorney for the Central District of California. Among the cases he worked on was the 2015 terrorist attack in San Bernardino.

== California State Assembly ==
In 2018, Essayli ran for the California State Assembly against incumbent Democrat Sabrina Cervantes and lost the election.

In 2022, Essayli ran for the state Assembly in the newly created 63rd Assembly District. He defeated Eastvale Mayor Clint Lorimore in the primary and businesswoman Fauzia Rizvi in the general election.

== Acting and First Assistant United States Attorney ==
In April 2025, United States Attorney General Pam Bondi appointed Essayli as interim United States Attorney for the Central District of California. The appointment was made under federal law allowing the Attorney General to fill vacancies without Senate confirmation for up to 120 days. The district, headquartered in Los Angeles, encompasses seven counties and nearly 20 million residents, making it the largest federal judicial district.

His appointment prompted pushback from Democratic officials and progressive organizations, culminating in the launch of Stop Essayli, a grassroots effort opposing his confirmation on grounds of alleged political retaliation and civil rights concerns.

Essayli released Alexander Smirnov, a tax evader who pleaded guilty to lying to the FBI about Hunter Biden, from prison after being pressured to do so by Aakash Singh, an associate deputy attorney general in the second Donald Trump administration.

The Los Angeles Times reported that Essayli struggled to secure convictions at grand juries for charges he brought against protestors during the June 2025 Los Angeles protests. By July 23, federal prosecutors brought 38 felony cases against protestors but secured only seven indictments, with many being dismissed or reduced to misdemeanor charges. Three federal law enforcement officers reported to the Times that they overheard a speakerphone conversation in the vicinity of the grand jury room in which Essayli screamed at a prosecutor to ignore the Department of Justice's Justice Manual and instead to secure indictments as directed by Pam Bondi. The report said Essayli's low number of indictments raised concerns among legal experts over the strength of the cases he was filing.

On October 28, 2025, in a 64-page order, Senior Judge John Michael Seabright of the United States District Court for the District of Hawaii ruled that Essayli's authority as an interim appointee had expired as of July 29, 2025. Seabright wrote that "Essayli unlawfully assumed the role of Acting United States Attorney for the Central District of California", stating that "He is disqualified from serving in that role". The judge determined that Essayli had been illegally serving in the acting role since July 2025, due to the lack of an official Senate confirmation, and clarified that Essayli may instead hold the title of "First Assistant United States Attorney" for the Central District of California. On October 28, 2026, in a separate order, Seabright ruled that Essayli was "unlawfully serving as a 'de facto' United States Attorney." Seabright disqualified Essayli from serving as Special Attorney and First Acting US Attorney on these cases.

On January 24, 2026, in response to the killing of Alex Pretti, Essayli posted on Twitter: "If you approach law enforcement with a gun, there is a high likelihood they will be legally justified in shooting you. Don't do it!" The gun-rights organizations National Rifle Association and Gun Owners of America both criticized the comments. The National Rifle Association called these comments "dangerous and wrong" and called for a full investigation. Gun Owners of America responded by stating: "We condemn the untoward comments of U.S. Attorney Bill Essayli. Federal agents are not 'highly likely' to be 'legally justified' in 'shooting' concealed carry licensees who approach while lawfully carrying a firearm. The Second Amendment protects Americans' right to bear arms while protesting—a right the federal government must not infringe upon."

== Personal life ==
Essayli is the first Muslim to be elected to the California State Assembly. Regarding his religious beliefs, he has stated "My religion drives my moral compass, but it's not everything that I am. I'm an American that happens to be Muslim."

== Electoral history ==
=== 2018 ===
2018 California's 60th State Assembly district election
Primary election
Party	Candidate	Votes	%
Republican	Bill Essayli	30,639	52.94%
Democratic	Sabrina Cervantes (incumbent)	27,241	47.06%
Total votes		57,880	100.00%
General election
Democratic	Sabrina Cervantes (incumbent)	67,950	54.07%
Republican	Bill Essayli	57,710	45.93%
Total votes		125,660	100.00%
Democratic hold			

=== 2022 ===
2022 California's 63rd State Assembly district election
Primary election
Party	Candidate	Votes	%
Democratic	Fauzia Rizvi	33,456	39.97%
Republican	Bill Essayli	28,659	34.23%
Republican	Clint Lorimore	21,598	25.80%
Total votes		83,713	100.00%
General election
Republican	Bill Essayli	82,613	58.61%
Democratic	Fauzia Rizvi	58,346	41.39%
Total votes		140,959	100.00%
Republican gain from Democratic			

=== 2024 ===
2024 California's 63rd State Assembly district election
Primary election
Party	Candidate	Votes	%
Republican	Bill Essayli (incumbent)	54,295	60.50%
Democratic	Chris Shoults	32,708	36.45%
No party preference	Orlando Munguia	2,735	3.05%
Total votes		89,738	100.00%
General election
Republican	Bill Essayli (incumbent)	122,968	57.28%
Democratic	Chris Shoults	91,708	42.72%
Total votes		214,676	100.00%
Republican hold			
