= Gordon Hickman Garland =

American politician

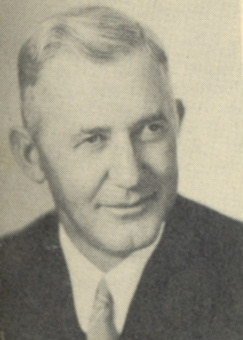

48th Speaker of the California State Assembly
- In office January 29, 1940 – January 18, 1942
- Preceded by: Paul Peek
- Succeeded by: Charles W. Lyon

Member of the California State Assembly from the 38th district
- In office January 4, 1937 – January 4, 1943
- Preceded by: Ford A. Chatters
- Succeeded by: Walter J. Fourt

Personal details
- Born: Gordon Garland; May 16, 1898 Lebanon, Missouri, U.S.
- Died: May 20, 1986 (aged 88) Exeter, California, U.S.
- Party: Democratic
- Spouse: Chinina Garland
- Children: 4
- Profession: Legislator, Rancher, Director of DMV, CHP Commissioner, Lobbyist

Gordon Hickman Garland (May 16, 1898 – May 20, 1986) was a conservative Democratic California state legislator and the 48th Speaker of the California State Assembly. Garland also served as Director of the Department of Motor Vehicles in the 1940s and was also Commissioner of the California Highway Patrol. After leaving state government, he became a lobbyist for the Golden Gate Bridge District, the California Water Association, and the California Chiropractic Association and was widely regarded as an expert on water issues in California. Garland was one of ten legislators that wrote the legislation to create the Central Valley Project.

During his Speakership between 1940 and 1942, Garland was often at odds with Governor Culbert L. Olson, a fellow Democrat. Governor Olson's staff was implicated in an electronic eavesdropping scheme in 1940, when bugging devices were discovered in Garland's hotel room in Sacramento.

California Assembly
Preceded by Ford A. Chatters	California State Assemblyman, 38th District; January 4, 1937 – January 4, 1943	Succeeded by Walter J. Fourt
Political offices
Preceded by Paul Peek	Speaker of the California State Assembly; January 1940–January 1942	Succeeded by Charles W. Lyon
