= Bill Bagley =

American politician (1928–2025)

== Biography ==
Bill Bagley
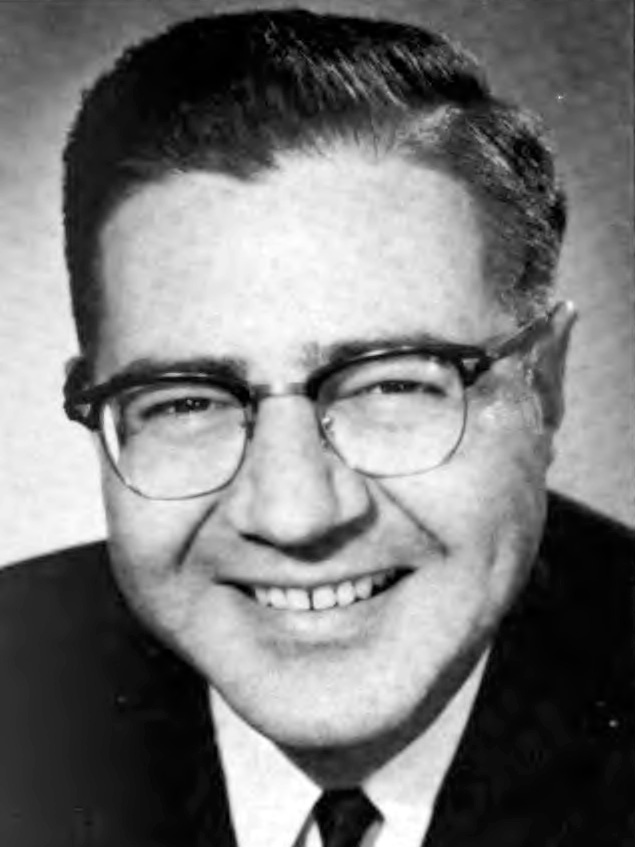
- Official portrait, 1963

Member of the Commodity Futures Trading Commission
- In office April 15, 1975 – April 15, 1980
- President: Gerald Ford; Jimmy Carter
- Preceded by: Office established

Chairman of the Commodity Futures Trading Commission
- In office April 15, 1975 – November 15, 1978
- President: Gerald Ford; Jimmy Carter
- Preceded by: Office established
- Succeeded by: Gary L. Seevers

Member of the California State Assembly from the 7th district
- In office January 2, 1961 – November 30, 1974
- Preceded by: Richard H. McCollister
- Succeeded by: John Garamendi (redistricted)

Personal details
- Born: William Thompson Bagley; June 29, 1928 San Francisco, California, U.S.
- Died: June 9, 2025 (aged 96)
- Party: Republican
- Spouse: Diane (Oldham) Bagley
- Children: 5
- Education: University of California, Berkeley
- Occupation: Lawyer

William Thompson Bagley (June 29, 1928 – June 9, 2025) was an American politician in the state of California who served in the California State Assembly as a Republican from 1961 to 1974, representing Marin and Sonoma Counties (then, Assembly District 7). Bagley was one of only three Republicans in the California State Assembly to support the Rumford Fair Housing Act of 1963. Bagley supported Nelson Rockefeller in the 1964 Republican Primary. From 1989 to 2002, Bagley served as a member of the University of California Board of Regents and in 2002, was named Alumnus of the Year by the California Alumni Association. In 1987, the stretch of California Highway 101 from the Robin Williams (née Waldo) Tunnel to San Rafael was named the William T. Bagley Freeway. He is the author of California's Golden Years: When Government Worked and Why. He also served as a member of the Commodity Futures Trading Commission from April 15, 1975 to April 15, 1980, and as Chairman for the commission from April 15, 1975 to November 15, 1978. On June 9, 2025, Bagley died at the age of 96.
