= Jerome Waldie =

American politician (1925–2009)

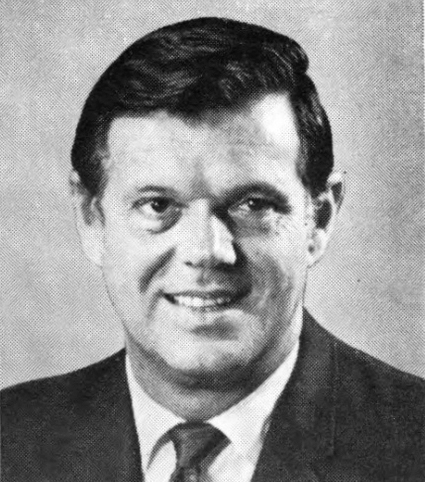

Member of the U.S. House of Representatives from California's 14th district
- In office June 7, 1966 – January 3, 1975
- Preceded by: John F. Baldwin Jr.
- Succeeded by: John J. McFall

Majority Leader of the California Assembly
- In office 1962–1965
- Preceded by: William A. Munnell
- Succeeded by: George N. Zenovich

Member of the California State Assembly from the 10th district
- In office January 5, 1959 – June 16, 1966
- Preceded by: Donald D. Doyle
- Succeeded by: James W. Dent

Personal details
- Born: Jerome Russell Waldie; February 15, 1925 Antioch, California
- Died: April 3, 2009 (aged 84) Placerville, California
- Party: Democratic
- Education: University of California, Berkeley; Boalt Hall School of Law

Military service
- Allegiance: United States
- Branch/service: United States Army
- Years of service: 1943-1946
- Battles/wars: World War II

Jerome Russell Waldie (February 15, 1925 – April 3, 2009) was an American World War II veteran, lawyer, and politician. He served five terms in the United States House of Representatives from California from 1966 to 1975.

== Early life ==
Born in Antioch, California on February 15, 1925, Waldie attended Antioch public schools.

=== Military service and education ===
After serving from 1943 to 1946 in the Army during World War II, he graduated from the University of California, Berkeley in 1950 with a degree in political science, and earned a law degree from the university's Boalt Hall School of Law in 1953.

== Political career ==
Waldie served as a Democratic member of the California State Assembly from January 5, 1959, to January 16, 1966, becoming Majority Leader in 1961. One of his last accomplishments in Sacramento was to sponsor a constitutional amendment pushed by Assembly Speaker Jesse Unruh that created a full-time state legislature in California.

=== Tenure in Congress ===
Waldie was then elected to the 89th Congress, by special election, to fill the vacancy caused by the death of Representative John F. Baldwin. He was re-elected four times, serving from June 7, 1966, to January 3, 1975.

As a Congressman, he was an early critic of U.S. involvement in the Vietnam War and also advocated health care reforms.

External videos
- Advocates; Should The President Be Impeached?, Waldie arguing for the impeachment of President Nixon; 01/03/1974, 88:47, WGBH

During the Watergate scandal, Waldie was a vocal critic of President Richard Nixon. Three days after Nixon fired Watergate Special Prosecutor Archibald Cox (in what became known as the "Saturday Night Massacre"), Waldie introduced a resolution calling for the impeachment of the President, one of the first members of the House Judiciary Committee to do so. Waldie's votes in favor of each of the three articles of impeachment on July 24, 1974, contributed to the resolution passing in the committee, recommending a full impeachment vote by the full House of Representatives. This led to Nixon's resignation prior to the impeachment.

=== Campaign for governor ===
Waldie did not run for re-election to the Congress that year. Instead, he campaigned for the Democratic nomination for Governor of California in the June primary election but was defeated by then-Secretary of State Jerry Brown, who went on to win in November.

== Post-Congressional life ==
As an ex-Congressman, Waldie served as a public advocate. He was chairman of the Federal Mine Safety and Health Review Commission from 1978 to 1979 and the executive director of the White House Conference on Aging (1980). He also served as a member of the California Agricultural Labor Relations Board from 1981 to 1985.

=== Death ===
He eventually retired to Placerville, California, where he resided until his death in April 2009 at the age of 84.

== Federal electoral history ==
1966 special election
Party	Candidate	Votes	%
Democratic	Jerome R. Waldie		53.7
Republican	Frank J. Newman		31.2
Republican	John A. Richardson		10.5
Democratic	Leo Antonio Costa		4.3
Republican	Dooris G. "Duke" Johnston		1.6
Republican	Tallak B. Wralstad		1.2
Total votes			100.0
Turnout			
Democratic gain from Republican			

1966 United States House of Representatives elections in California
Party	Candidate	Votes	%
Democratic	Jerome R. Waldie (Incumbent)	108,668	56.4
Republican	Frank J. Newman	83,878	43.6
Total votes		192,546	100.0
Turnout			
Democratic hold			

1968 United States House of Representatives elections in California
Party	Candidate	Votes	%
Democratic	Jerome R. Waldie (Incumbent)	152,500	71.6
Republican	David W. Schuh	56,598	26.6
American Independent	Luis W. Hamilton	3,945	1.9
Total votes		213,043	100.0
Turnout			
Democratic hold			

1970 United States House of Representatives elections in California
Party	Candidate	Votes	%
Democratic	Jerome R. Waldie (Incumbent)	148,655	74.5
Republican	Byron D. Athan	50,750	25.5
Total votes		199,405	100.0
Turnout			
Democratic hold			

1972 United States House of Representatives elections in California
Party	Candidate	Votes	%
Democratic	Jerome R. Waldie (Incumbent)	158,948	77.6
Republican	Floyd E. Sims	45,985	22.4
Total votes		204,933	100.0
Turnout			
Democratic hold			

U.S. House of Representatives
Preceded by John F. Baldwin Jr.	Member of the U.S. House of Representatives from California's 14th congressional district 1966–1975	Succeeded by John J. McFall
