= Cameron Smyth =

American politician

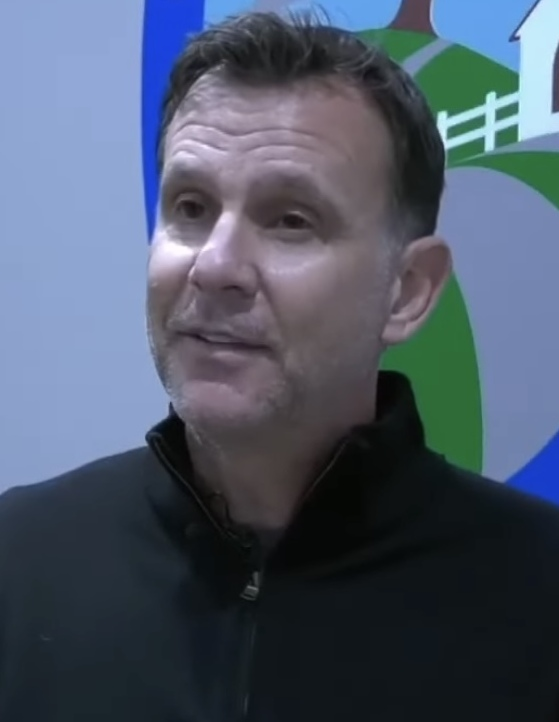
- Smyth in 2024

Santa Clarita City Councilman
- In office December 13, 2016 – December 10, 2024
- In office May 1, 2000 – December 4, 2006

Member of the California State Assembly from the 38th district
- In office December 4, 2006 – November 30, 2012
- Preceded by: Keith Richman
- Succeeded by: Scott Wilk

Personal details
- Born: August 19, 1971 (age 55) Santa Clarita, California
- Party: Republican
- Spouse: Lena Lewandowski
- Children: 3
- Education: University of California, Davis
- Profession: Consultant

Cameron Smyth (born August 19, 1971) is a California Republican politician, serving on the Santa Clarita City Council since 2016 until he was no longer able to run due to redistricting, having previously served on the council from 2000 to 2006. He served as the city's mayor in 2003, 2005, 2017, and 2020. Smyth served in the California State Assembly from 2006 to 2012 when term limits required him to retire from the Assembly.

== Early life and education ==
Born and raised in Santa Clarita, Smyth attended local public schools, graduating from William S. Hart High School and earned his B.A. in Rhetoric and Communications from the University of California, Davis, where he was also a two-sport athlete.

== Early career ==
Smyth began his career as a Field Representative for the California Republican Party. In 1994 he was hired by the late State Assemblyman William "Pete" Knight. In 1996, Smyth served as campaign manager for Knight's successful State Senate campaign. Other than Garrett Biggs, who served as on-site manager for the late Assemblyman Nao Takasugi's successful re-election campaign, Smyth was the youngest on-site manager for any state legislative race in California at that time.

Upon winning the election, Knight promoted Smyth to the position of Deputy Chief of Staff. In 2000, Smyth moved to the private sector to operate his own consulting business.

== Electoral career ==
Smyth was first elected to the Santa Clarita City Council in 2000 and re-elected in 2004. He served as Mayor in 2003 and again in 2005.

In 2006, he was elected to the California State Assembly, succeeding Keith Richman who was term limited. Smyth was re-elected in 2008 and 2010, leaving in 2012 due to term limits.

In 2016, Smyth was again elected to the Santa Clarita City Council and re-elected in 2020. He served as mayor in 2017 and again in 2020.

== Personal ==
Smyth and his wife Lena are the parents of three children.
