= Carley V. Porter =

American politician

Member of the California State Assembly from the 38th district
- In office January 7, 1963 - December 6, 1972
- Preceded by: Jack T. Casey
- Succeeded by: Robert M. McLennan

Member of the California State Assembly from the 69th district
- In office November 8, 1949 - January 7, 1963
- Preceded by: Ralph C. Dills
- Succeeded by: William E. Dannemeyer

Personal details
- Born: February 19, 1906 Chicago, Illinois
- Died: December 6, 1972 (aged 66) Sacramento, California
- Party: Democratic
- Spouse: Marie Walton (m. 1934)
- Children: 1

Carley V. Porter (February 19, 1906 – December 6, 1972) served in the California State Assembly from the 69th District from 1949 to 1963, and from the 38th District from 1963 until his death in 1972. A resident of Compton, his constituency under both of his Assembly district numbers was in southern Los Angeles County.

Legislation that bears Porter's name includes the Burns-Porter Act, which resulted in the California State Water Project, and the Porter-Cologne Water Quality Control Act, anti-pollution legislation that predated the federal Clean Water Act.

During World War II, Porter served in the United States Army.
