= Natasha Johnson =

American politician

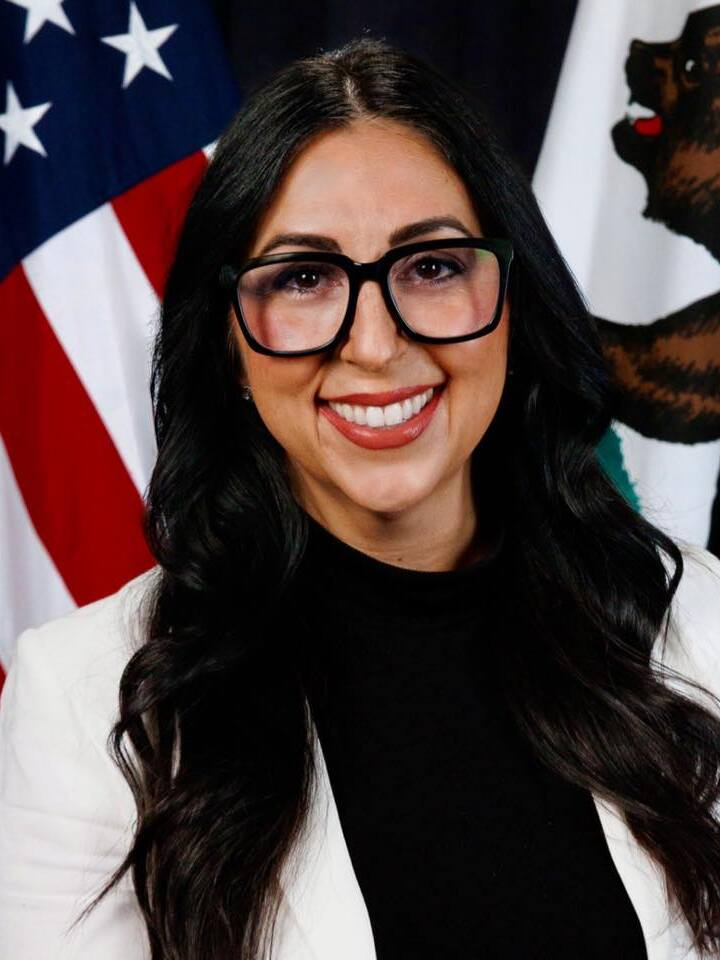
- Official portrait, 2026

Member of the California State Assembly from the 63rd district
- Incumbent
- Assumed office September 8, 2025
- Preceded by: Bill Essayli

Mayor of Lake Elsinore
- In office 2023–2024
- Preceded by: Timothy J. Sheridan
- Succeeded by: Steve Manos
- In office 2018–2019
- Preceded by: Robert E. Magee
- Succeeded by: Steve Manos
- In office 2014–2015
- Preceded by: Robert E. Magee
- Succeeded by: Steve Manos

Personal details
- Born: 1977 or 1978 (age 47–48)
- Party: Republican
- Spouse: Scott Johnson
- Children: 3

Natasha Johnson (born 1977/1978) is an American politician and businesswoman who has served in the California State Assembly from the 63rd district since September 2025, after winning a special election to replace Bill Essayli. She previously served on the city council of Lake Elsinore, California from 2012 to 2025, including three one-year terms as mayor.

== Career ==
Johnson previously worked in personal finance and most recently in a marketing role for Navy Federal Credit Union.

=== Lake Elsinore City Council ===
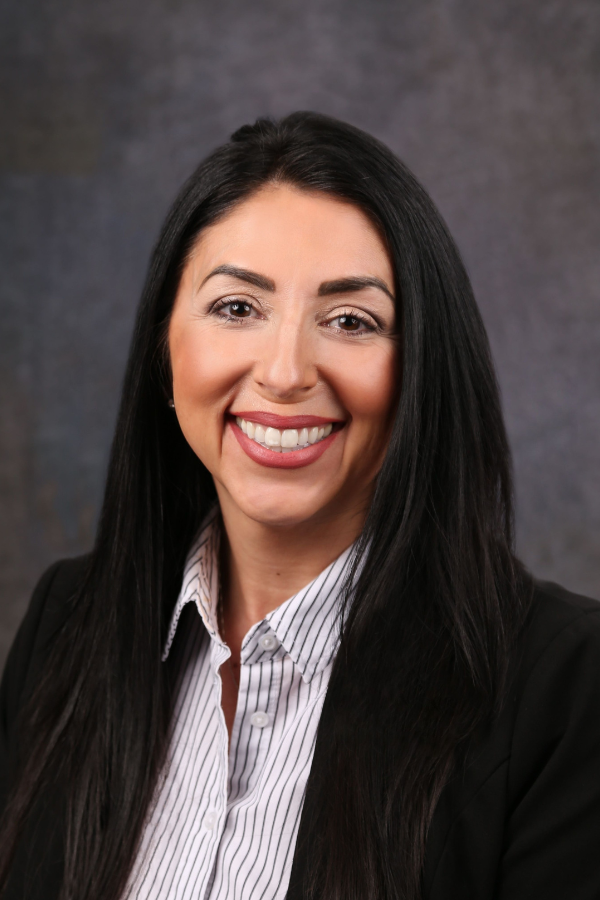
Johnson as City Councilmember

Johnson was first elected to the Lake Elsinore city council in 2012. She was first sworn in on December 4, 2012; she was also first appointed mayor pro tem several days later, on December 11, 2012. Johnson served as mayor for the city three times, and as mayor pro tem three times, both of which are merely titles which rotate among the entire membership of the council every year.

In 2018, she served her second term as mayor, having been selected by fellow councilmembers. She again served as mayor in 2023. In 2018, she voted unanimously with the city council to express the city's opposition to SB 54, which prevents state and local law enforcement agencies from using their resources on behalf of federal immigration enforcement agencies including ICE.

Her resignation from city council took effect on September 8, 2025.

=== California State Assembly ===
Following incumbent Republican Bill Essayli's resignation from the California State Assembly, Johnson announced her campaign for the special election to fill his term. Essayli endorsed her the day after resigning. She advanced from the blanket primary to a run-off against Democratic candidate Chris Shoults. She declared victory over Shoults on election night and was sworn in on September 8, 2025.

In June 2026, Johnson voted against AB-1921 (Protect Our Games Act); it passed 43-16.

== Electoral history ==
=== 2012 ===
2012 Lake Elsinore city council election (Note: Top three candidates won three open council seats.)
Party	Candidate	Votes	%
Nonpartisan	Bob Magee	4,979	20.79%
Nonpartisan	Natasha Johnson	4,728	19.74%
Nonpartisan	Steve Manos	3,587	14.97%
Nonpartisan	Jerry Carlos	2,724	11.37%
Nonpartisan	Peter G. Weber	2,224	9.28%
Nonpartisan	Rick Morsch	2,076	8.67%
Nonpartisan	William Park	1,972	8.23%
Nonpartisan	Craig Turner	1,664	6.95%
Total votes		23,954	100.0

=== 2016 ===
2016 Lake Elsinore city council election
Party	Candidate	Votes	%
Nonpartisan	Steve Manos	8,472	26.34%
Nonpartisan	Bob Magee	7,649	23.78%
Nonpartisan	Natasha Johnson	7,586	23.59%
Nonpartisan	Steve Martin	5,324	16.55%
Nonpartisan	Edwin Castro	3,129	9.73%
Total votes		32,160	100.0

=== 2020 ===
2020 Lake Elsinore, District 4 city council election
Party	Candidate	Votes	%
Nonpartisan	Natasha Johnson	3,461	100.0%

=== 2024 ===
2024 Lake Elsinore, District 4 city council election (cancelled) (Note: Due to no other candidate filing to challenge Johnson, the 2024 election for District 4 was called off. Johnson was then re-appointed to office for a 4-year term by the Lake Elsinore City Council, via Resolution No. 2024-42.)
Party	Candidate	Votes	%
Nonpartisan	Natasha Johnson	Uncontested	N/A

=== 2025 ===
2025 California State Assembly 63rd district special election (Vacancy resulting from the resignation of Bill Essayli)
Primary election
Party	Candidate	Votes	%
Republican	Natasha Johnson	26,735	46.2
Democratic	Chris Shoults	25,557	44.1
Republican	Vincent Romo	4,881	8.4
Libertarian	Zachary T. Consalvo	756	1.3
American Independent	Maricar Payad (write-in)	1	0.0
Total votes		57,930	100.0
General election
Republican	Natasha Johnson	34,866	53.5
Democratic	Chris Shoults	30,332	46.5
Total votes		64,198	100.0
Republican hold			

=== 2026 ===
2026 California's 63rd State Assembly district primary election
Primary election
Party	Candidate	Votes	%
Republican	Natasha Johnson (incumbent)	79,590	99.29%
Peace and Freedom	Kevin Akin (write-in)	570	0.71%
Total votes		80,160	100.0
