= Keith Richman =

American politician

Keith Stuart Richman

Member of the California State Assembly from the 38th district
- In office December 4, 2000 – November 30, 2006
- Preceded by: Tom McClintock
- Succeeded by: Cameron Smyth

Personal details
- Born: Keith Stuart Richman; November 21, 1953 Syracuse, New York, U.S.
- Died: July 30, 2010 (aged 56) Los Angeles, California
- Cause of death: Brain cancer
- Party: Republican
- Spouse: Suzan
- Children: 2 daughters (Note: Richman is survived by his wife, Suzan, and two grown daughters from a previous marriage.)
- Parent: Monroe Richman
- Education: Birmingham High School; University of California, Davis; UCLA School of Public Health; UCLA School of Medicine
- Occupation: Physician and politician

Keith Stuart Richman (November 21, 1953 – July 30, 2010) was a California Republican politician. From 2000 to 2006, he served in the California State Assembly representing the 38th Assembly District based in Northwest Los Angeles County.

Born in Syracuse, New York, Richman graduated from Birmingham High School in 1971 and earned his Bachelor of Science in 1975 from the University of California, Davis, where he played baseball and was named an All-Conference pitcher. As part of the 1972 UC Davis baseball team, he was named to the UC Davis Baseball Hall of Fame. In 1998, he was named the Collegiate Alumnus of the Year by the American Baseball Coaches Association.

In 1978, Richman earned his Master of Public Health from the UCLA School of Public Health and his M.D. from the UCLA School of Medicine.

After graduating from UCLA, he was a medical doctor and served as the chairman of the board of Lakeside HealthCare, Inc., a health-care provider. In January 2005 he received California's Radical Centrist of the Year Award from RadicalCentrism.org.

Richman was elected to the Assembly in November 2000 replacing Republican Tom McClintock and won re-election in 2002 and 2004. Richman was elected Mayor of the City of San Fernando Valley in 2002, but was unable to take office, as the San Fernando Valley's bid to secede from Los Angeles failed after voters in the remainder of Los Angeles rejected independence for the Valley.

In 2006 he sought the Republican nomination for California State Treasurer but lost to Board of Equalization member Claude Parrish 56%-44%.

With his father, Dr. Monroe Richman, who had also previously held elective office (as a member of the Los Angeles Community College District Board of Trustees), he practiced internal medicine in Sun Valley. He also chaired the Valley Community Clinic Board.

Richman died at Ronald Reagan UCLA Medical Center on July 30, 2010 from brain cancer.

== Notes ==
California Assembly
Preceded by Tom McClintock	California State Assemblyman; 38th District; December 4, 2000 – November 30, 2006	Succeeded by Cameron Smyth
