= Paula Boland =

American politician

Member of the California State Assembly from the 38th district
- In office December 3, 1990 - November 30, 1996
- Preceded by: Marion W. La Follette
- Succeeded by: Tom McClintock

Personal details
- Born: January 17, 1940 (age 86) Oyster Bay, New York
- Party: Republican
- Spouse: Lloyd E. Boland Jr.
- Children: 2
- Occupation: Realtor, City council woman.

Paula L. Boland (born January 17, 1940) is an American politician from California and a member of the Republican party.

== State Assembly ==
A realtor, Boland won election to the Granada Hills-based 38th district in the California State Assembly in 1990, succeeding Republican Marion W. La Follette. She easily won reelection in 1992 and 1994.

== San Fernando Valley secession movement ==
Boland became associated with an effort by the San Fernando Valley to secede from the rest of city of Los Angeles in 1995. Although she successfully authored the bill to put the referendum on the ballot, it was eventually defeated in a citywide vote.

== State Senate race ==
In 1996 Boland moved into the Burbank-Glendale-Pasadena-based 21st district in an attempt to succeed veteran Republican Newton Russell in the California State Senate. Russell was barred by state term limits from seeking reelection. Boland was hampered by her relocation into the area and a philosophy that seemed a bit too conservative for the district. She lost to Democrat Adam Schiff, a former Federal prosecutor, by 8 percentage points.

== Post Assembly ==
After leaving the legislature, Boland served as an elected member of the Los Angeles Charter Commission, representing her Granada Hills base.

Political offices
Preceded by Marion W. La Follette	California State Assembly, 38th District; December 3, 1990 - November 30, 1996	Succeeded by Tom McClintock
