= Robert S. Stevens (judge) =

American judge and politician (1916–2000)

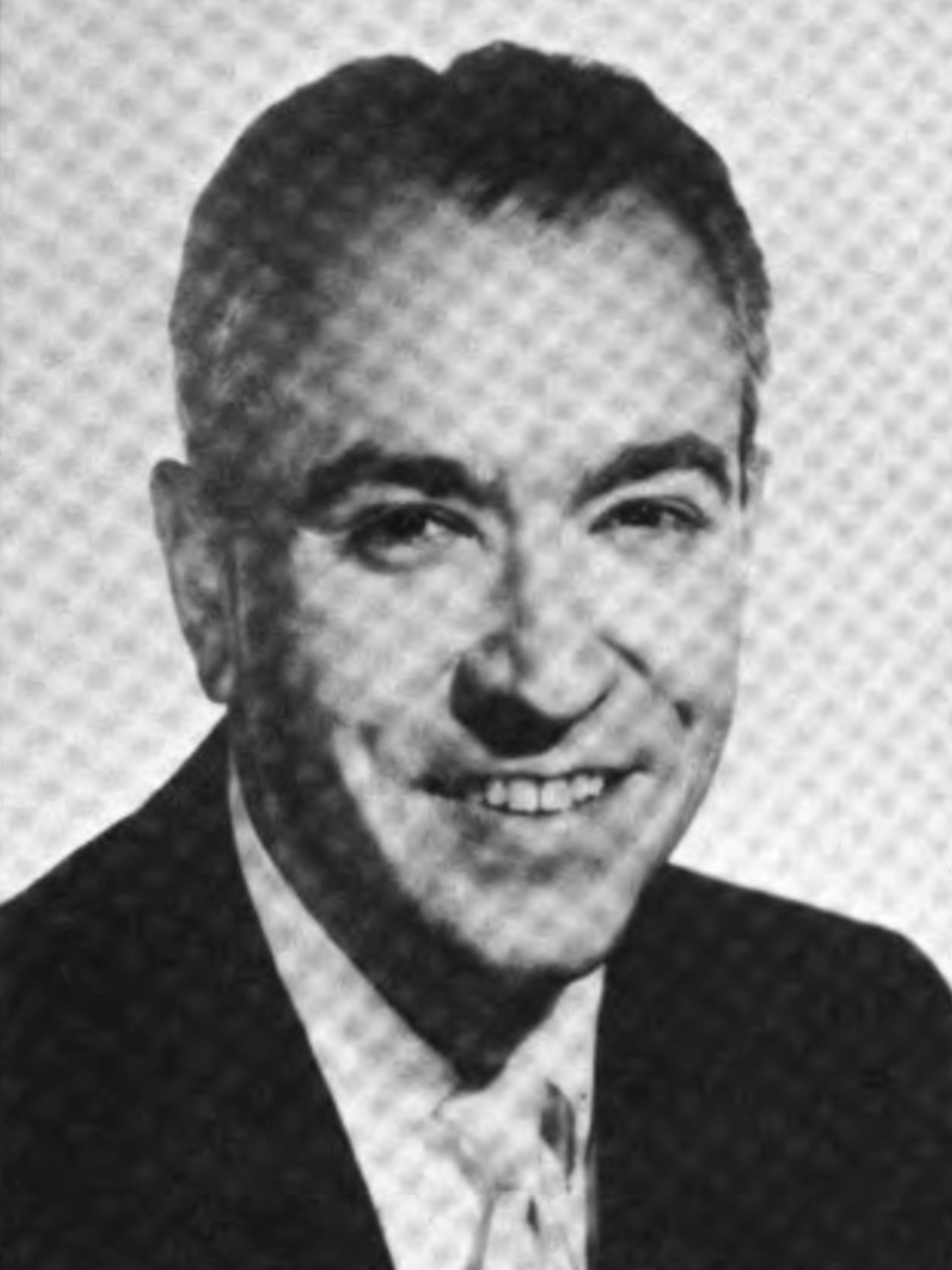

Judge of the Los Angeles County Superior Court
- In office 1977–1981
- Appointed by: Jerry Brown

Member of the California Senate from the 25th district
- In office January 2, 1967 – November 30, 1976
- Preceded by: Fred Farr
- Succeeded by: H. L. Richardson

Member of the California State Assembly from the 60th district
- In office January 7, 1963 – January 2, 1967
- Preceded by: Harold K. Levering
- Succeeded by: Paul V. Priolo

Personal details
- Born: June 10, 1916 Salt Lake City, Utah, U.S.
- Died: September 9, 2000 (aged 84) UCLA Santa Monica Medical Center, Santa Monica, California, U.S.
- Party: Republican
- Spouse: Marjorie Turner (m. 1945)
- Children: 4
- Occupation: Attorney; politician; judge

Robert Stringam Stevens (June 10, 1916 – September 9, 2000) was a politician who rose to the level of California State Assemblyman and later California State Senator before being appointed judge of the Los Angeles County Superior Court by governor Jerry Brown in 1977. A member of the Republican Party, he left the bench in 1981.

== Early life ==
Stevens was born on June 10, 1916 in Salt Lake City.

== Career ==
Stevens served as a member of the California State Assembly from the 60th district from January 7, 1963 to January 2, 1967.

He served in the California State Senate from the 25th district from January 2, 1967 to November 30, 1976.

He served as a judge of the Los Angeles County Superior Court from 1977 to 1981 after being appointed by governor Jerry Brown.

== Personal life ==
He married Marjorie Turner in 1945 with whom he had 4 children.

== Death ==
He died on September 9, 2000 at the UCLA Santa Monica Medical Center.
