= Randal F. Dickey =

American politician

Majority Leader of the California Assembly
- In office 1947–1953
- Preceded by: Sam L. Collins
- Succeeded by: Harold K. Levering

Member of the California State Assembly from the 14th district
- In office January 6, 1941 – January 7, 1957
- Preceded by: George P. Miller
- Succeeded by: Robert W. Crown

Personal details
- Born: July 5, 1899 Trenton, Kansas
- Died: October 16, 1975 (aged 76)
- Party: Republican
- Spouse: Helen A. Dickey
- Children: 3

Military service
- Branch/service: United States Navy
- Battles/wars: World War I

Randal F. Dickey (July 5, 1899 – October 16, 1975) was a United States politician.

Dickey was born in Trenton, Kansas. During World War I, he served in the United States Navy. He subsequently served in the California legislature; from 1947 to 1951, he was Republican Floor Leader of the California State Assembly.
