= Porter-Cologne Water Quality Control Act =

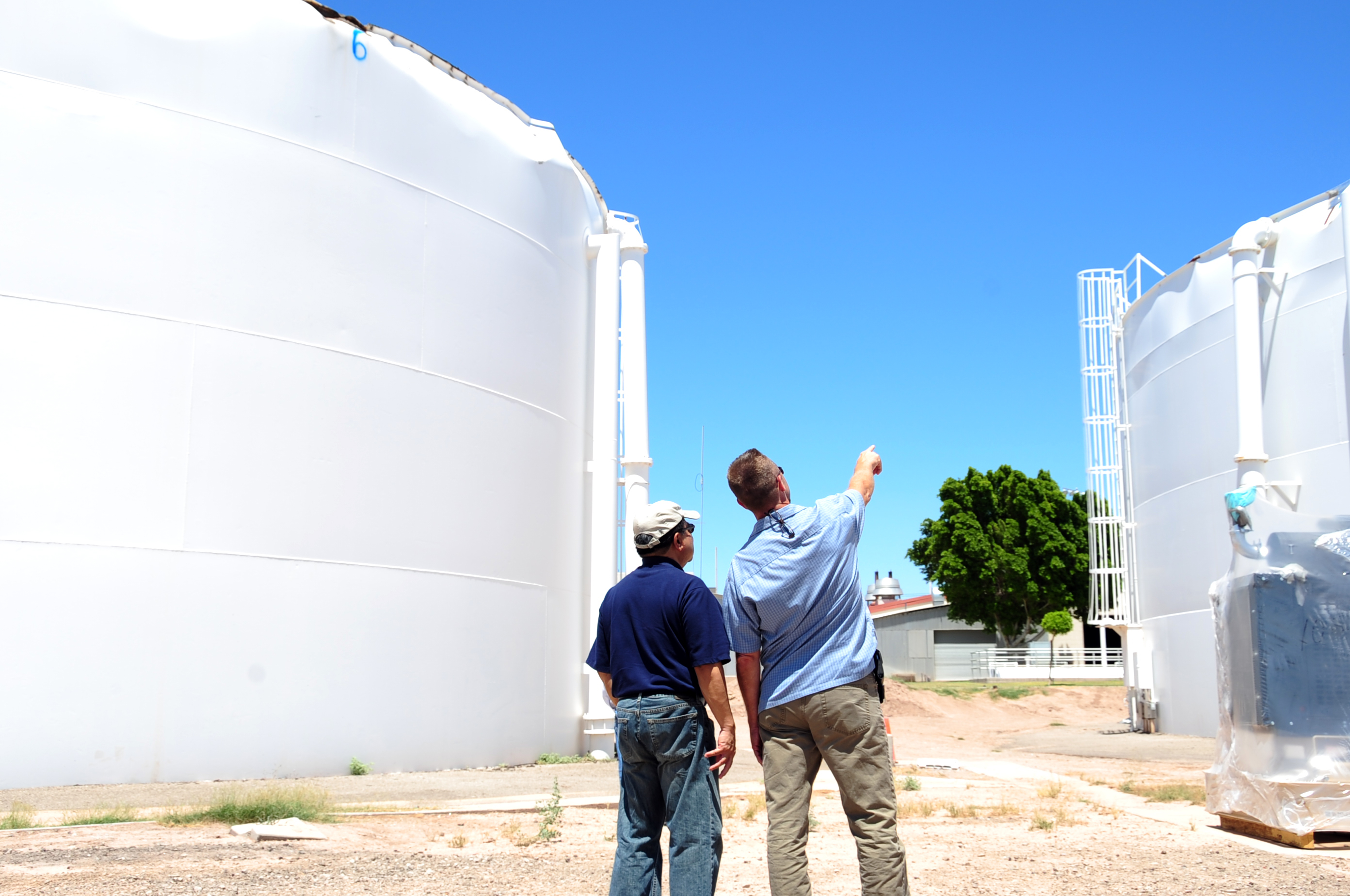
A water treatment facility in the Imperial County, California.

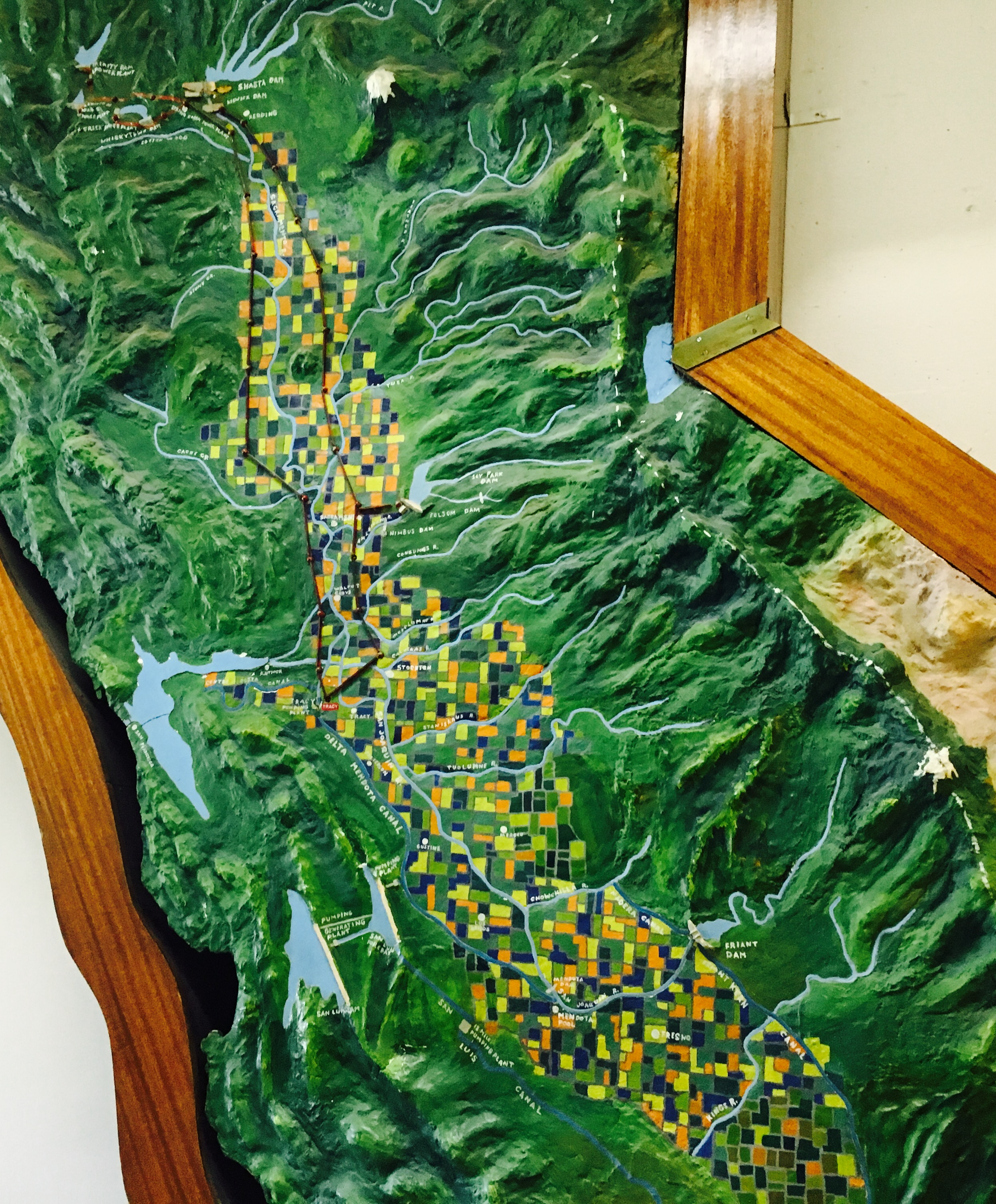
This a 2-D Model capturing the Central Valley Project, created by the Bureau of Reclamation

The Porter-Cologne Water Quality Control Act is clean water act of California that expanded the enforcement authority of the State Water Resources Control Board and the 9 Regional Water Quality Control Boards. The act provided for the California Environmental Protection Agency to create the local boards and better protect water rights and water quality.

== History ==
The Porter-Cologne Act (California Water Code, Section 7) was created in 1969 and is the law that governs water quality regulation in California. The legislation bears the names of legislators Carley V. Porter and Gordon Cologne. It was established to be a program to protect water quality as well as beneficial uses of water. This act applies to surface water, groundwater, wetlands and both point and nonpoint sources of pollution. There are nine regional water boards and one state water board that have resulted from this act. The act requires the adoption of water quality control plans that contain the guiding policies of water pollution management in California.

== Mission ==
The act uses the National Pollutant Discharge Elimination System (NPDES) permits for point source discharges and waste discharge requirements (WDRs) in order to keep people from degrading the water quality of the State. The policy states:

1. The quality of all waters of the State shall be protected
2. All activities and factors affecting the quality of water will be regulated in order to attain the highest water quality within reason.
3. The State must be prepared to exercise its fullest power and jurisdiction in order to protect the quality of water in the State from degradation.

=== The enforcement of WDRs include ===
- cease and desist orders
- clean up and abatement orders
- administrative civil liability orders
- civil court actions
- criminal prosecutions

== State Water Resource Control Board ==
The State Water Resources Control Board provides guidance and oversight over the nine regional water boards which oversee areas based on hydrological barriers. They are also responsible for allocating funds and reviewing the regions' decisions in order to make sure that water quality in the State isn't becoming degraded.

The regional water boards are charged with implementing the law's provisions and have primary responsibility for protecting water quality in California. The regional water boards include:

1. North Coast
2. San Francisco Bay
3. Central Coast
4. Los Angeles
5. Central Valley
6. Lahontan
7. Colorado River Basin
8. Santa Ana
9. San Diego

== Water quality control plans ==
The Porter-Cologne Act requires the adoption of water quality control plans that give direction to managing water pollution in California. Usually, basin plans get adopted by the Regional Water Boards and are updated when needed. The plans incorporate the beneficial uses of the waters of the State and then provide objectives that should be met in order to maintain and protect these uses. They can meet these objectives by surveillance and monitoring, and the Regional Water Boards have the authority to enforce these objectives. Along with the Regional Water Boards, the State Water Resources Board can issue and enforce permits containing waste discharge requirements in order to maintain clean surface water and groundwater.

There is a water quality control plan for enclosed bays and estuaries whose objective is to protect the benthic community from direct exposure to pollutants in the sediment. It also seeks to minimize the human health risk due to the consumption of shellfish and fish that may have high levels of toxic contaminants in them. The plan also includes the beneficial uses, their objectives and how these objectives will continue to enhance the water quality.

Each region has their own water quality control plan (basin plan) that identifies the specific beneficial uses of water in their region for the past, present, and future. These basin plans also all have objectives for which the plan clearly states steps that are being taken or will be taken in order to meet the objectives. These objectives are created for the purpose of keeping the water clean and safe to use beneficially. The law is based in the idea that surface and groundwater should be protected against the adverse effects of waste and other contaminants. Accordingly, the Regional Board has the authority to give out permits for the purpose of waste disposal or waste assimilation. However, the discharges of waste into the water is not a right and is up to the discretion of the Regional Board. They have the authority to authorize when the discharge is to take place, for how long, and how much waste can be put into the water.

== Clean water programs ==
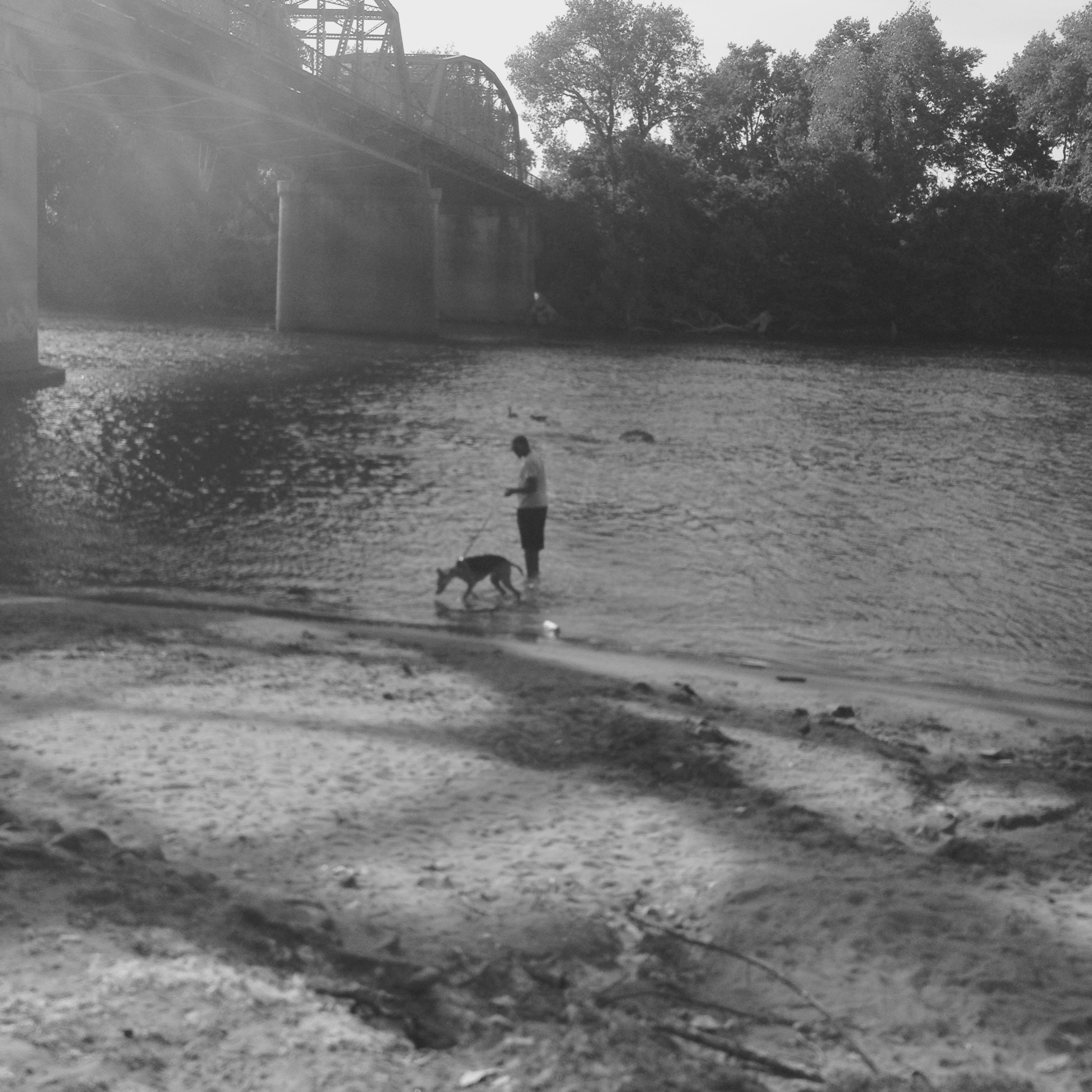
Discovery Park where the American River meets the Sacramento River.

Although the regions have plans that assure the community that the state is working to maintain clean and safe surface and groundwater, there are cities that have taken it upon themselves to implement clean water programs. The California Department of Public Health had a Drinking Water Program that was transferred to the State Water Resources Control Board. The idea of safe drinking water is the basis for the cities implementing their own clean water programs.

For example, Oceanside Clean Water Program is set up to improve the water quality in their local creeks, rivers and oceans and to keep in accordance with the state and regional environmental regulations. The program focuses on education the community, specifically the developers, residents, industrial and commercial companies and the academia about pollution and how they can prevent it from happening. They monitor the water quality, inspect construction sites and perform educational outreaches to their community because they are susceptible to stormwater pollution being a coastal community.

The City of Del Mar created their Clean Water Program for the purpose of protecting their natural resources such as lagoons, beaches and the Pacific Ocean from urban runoff. They have pollution from dumpsters, improperly stored hazardous materials and equipment so their staff goes out into the community and inspects construction areas, and educates the public of the situation. The public can call or email if they see urban runoff events taking place such as over irrigation, water being used to clean driveways, and building materials or dirt coming off the property of construction sites.

== Implementation with respect to cannabis ==
Instead of cannabis farms being shut down by law enforcement, in recent years they have been getting hit by fines from the State for not having the required permits to discharge.

The Central Valley Regional Water Quality Control Board gave a huge fine for water quality violations against a property owner in rural California. The owners failed to get the necessary permits prior to developing the land, and their growing resulted in discharges of highly erodible sediment and the unauthorized placement of filling a tributary. Both of which violates the Clean Water Act and the Porter-Cologne Water Quality Control Act.

The California Control, Regulate, And Tax Cannabis Act of 2016 (ReformCA) allows for protocols to be implemented to ensure compliance with the laws and regulations applicable to cultivating cannabis. This act also incorporates environmental impacts, water quality and supply in accordance with the California Environmental Quality Act (CEQA), Clean Water Act, the Porter-Cologne Water Quality Control Act, timber production zones, wastewater discharge permits and any other permit necessary for diverting water.

== Agricultural runoff ==
Although agricultural runoff is the largest source of pollution in the Central Valley, the Porter-Cologne Water Quality Control Act was not implemented by the Central Valley Regional Board back in 1982. Public interest groups have challenged that ruling stating that the action taken by the Board was based on the unsupported assumption that toxic discharge from agriculture did not pose a threat to the environment or the public, and with the assumption that farmers would self-regulate.
