= List of majority leaders of the California State Assembly =

Majority Leader of the California State Assembly
- Seal of the California State Assembly

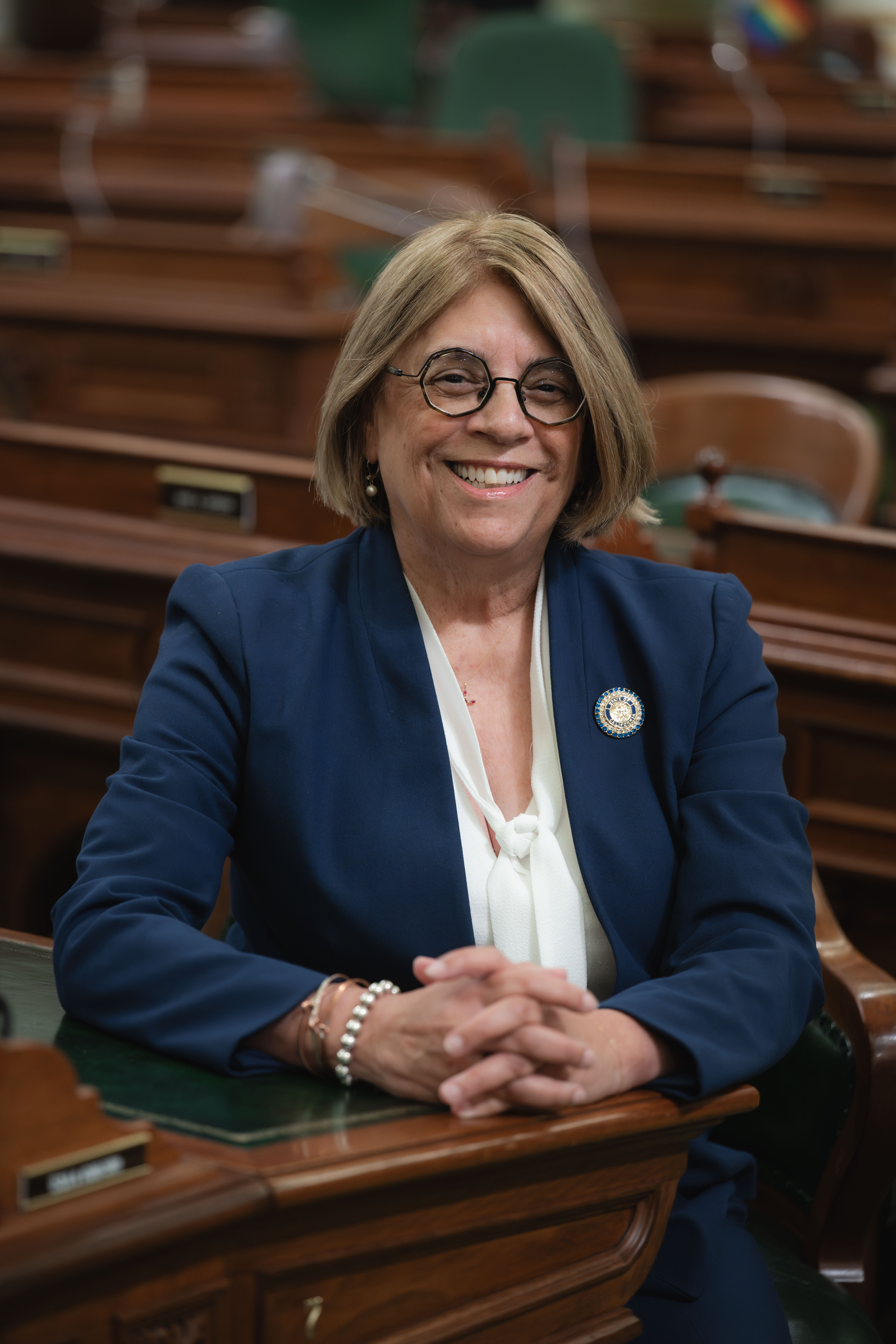
- Incumbent; Cecilia Aguiar-Curry (D) since November 22, 2023
- Appointer: Majority party in the Assembly
- Term length: 2 years
- Inaugural holder: Sam L. Collins (R)
- Formation: 1943
- Website: https://www.assembly.ca.gov/assemblymembers/leadership

The Majority Leader of the California State Assembly is the majority party's parliamentary leader in the California State Assembly. The majority leader is usually also the second highest ranking member of the majority caucus, after the speaker. The current majority leader is Cecilia Aguiar-Curry.

== List ==
Name	Took office	Left office	Party/caucus
Sam L. Collins	1943	1947	Republican
Randal F. Dickey	1947	1953	Republican
Harold K. Levering	1953	1955	Republican
Richard H. McCollister	1955	1958	Republican
William A. Munnell	1959	1961	Democratic
Jerome R. Waldie	1962	1965	Democratic
George N. Zenovich	1966	1968	Democratic
W. Craig Biddle	1969	1970	Republican
Walter Karabian	1971	1972	Democratic
Jack R. Fenton	1972	1974	Democratic
Howard Berman	1974	1980	Democratic
Mike Roos	1980	1986	Democratic
Thomas M. Hannigan	1986	1995	Democratic
Jim Brulte	1995 (June)	1995 (August)	Republican
Curt Pringle	1995	1996	Republican
James E. Rogan	1996 (January)	1996 (November)	Republican
Antonio Villaraigosa	1996	1998	Democratic
Kevin Shelley	1998	2002	Democratic
Wilma Chan	2002	2004	Democratic
Dario Frommer	2004	2006	Democratic
Karen Bass	2006	2008	Democratic
Alberto Torrico	2008	2010	Democratic
Charles Calderon	2010	2012	Democratic
Toni Atkins	2012	2014	Democratic
V. Manuel Perez	2014 (May)	2014 (November)	Democratic
Chris Holden	2014	2016	Democratic
Ian Calderon	2016	2020	Democratic
Eloise Gómez Reyes	2020	2023	Democratic
Isaac Bryan	2023 (July)	2023 (November)	Democratic
Cecilia Aguiar-Curry	2023	Incumbent	Democratic

== See also ==
- Speaker of the California State Assembly
- List of minority leaders of the California State Assembly
- Majority leader
- Parliamentary leader
