= Dorothy Donohue =

California state legislator

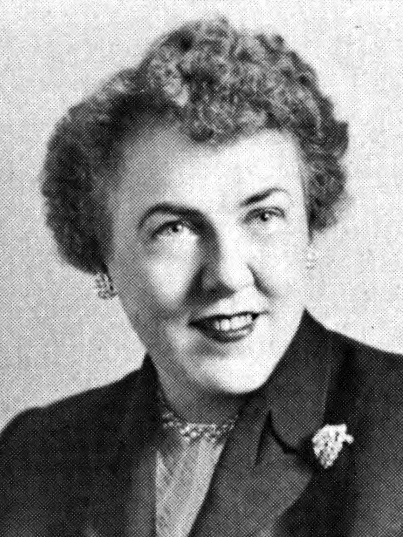

Member of the California State Assembly from the 38th district
- In office January 5, 1953 – April 4, 1960
- Preceded by: John B. Cooke
- Succeeded by: Jack T. Casey

Personal details
- Born: February 20, 1911 Los Angeles, California
- Died: April 4, 1960 (aged 49)
- Party: Democratic

Dorothy Margaret Donohue (Note: Various sources spell her name as Donohue, Donahue, and Donahoe.) (February 20, 1911 – April 4, 1960) was a state legislator in California. She was a member of the California Assembly in from 1953 until her death in 1960.

In 1960, she "spearheaded" the development of the California Master Plan for Higher Education. The legislative framework implementing the recommendations of the Master Plan was named the Donahoe Higher Education Act in her honor after her sudden death on April 4, 1960—which meant she did not live long enough to see Governor Pat Brown sign the bill into law on April 27, 1960. She had fought for the creation of the Master Plan to ensure that future generations of California schoolchildren would have the opportunity to enroll in higher education which she was cruelly denied by the Great Depression in the United States.

She served with Pauline Davis in the California Assembly. She was "on the slate of delegates" to the 1960 Democratic Party Convention in Los Angeles.
