= California's 38th State Assembly district =

State legislative district in California

Current assemblymember
Steve Bennett; D–Ventura
- Population (2010) • Voting age • Citizen voting age: 469,883; 351,818; 296,536
- Demographics: 55.62% White; 3.55% Black; 25.77% Latino; 13.41% Asian; 0.58% Native American; 0.20% Hawaiian/Pacific Islander; 0.33% other; 0.53% remainder of multiracial
- Registered voters: 283,207
- Registration: 34.28% Democratic; 33.44% Republican; 26.78% No party preference

California's 38th State Assembly district is one of 80 California State Assembly districts. It is currently represented by Democrat Steve Bennett of Ventura.

== District profile ==
The district is entirely within Ventura County. It represents the cities of Oxnard, Ventura, Santa Paula, Port Hueneme, Filmore, Ojai, as well as parts of Camarillo.

== Election results from statewide races ==
Year	Office	Results
2021	Recall	No 50.2 – 49.8%
2020	President	Biden 53.2 - 44.8%
2018	Governor	Newsom 50.3 – 49.7%
2018	Senator	Feinstein 51.3 – 48.7%
2016	President	Clinton 49.6 – 44.4%
2016	Senator	Harris 62.5 – 37.5%
2014	Governor	Kashkari 56.8 – 43.2%
2012	President	Romney 50.8 – 46.7%
2012	Senator	Emken 51.7 – 48.3%

== List of assembly members representing the district ==
Due to redistricting, the 38th district has been moved around different parts of the state. The current iteration resulted from the 2021 redistricting by the California Citizens Redistricting Commission.

Assembly members	Party	Years served	Counties represented	Notes
William B. Hunt	Republican	January 5, 1885 – January 3, 1887	San Francisco	
Daniel S. Regan	Democratic	January 3, 1887 – January 5, 1891	San Francisco	
A. T. Barnett	Republican	January 5, 1891 – January 2, 1893	San Francisco	
Bert Schlesinger	Democratic	January 2, 1893 – January 7, 1895	San Francisco	
Marcus Lewis	Republican	January 7, 1895 – January 4, 1897	San Francisco	
Gustave Pohlmann	Republican	January 4, 1897 – January 2, 1899	San Francisco	
William H. Rickard	Republican	January 2, 1899 – January 1, 1901	San Francisco	
Bert Schlesinger	Democratic	January 1, 1901 – January 5, 1903	San Francisco	
Marcus Lewis	Republican	January 5, 1903 – January 2, 1905	San Francisco	
Samuel H. Beckett	Republican	January 2, 1905 – January 4, 1909	San Francisco	
William C. Pugh	Republican	January 4, 1909 – January 2, 1911	San Francisco	Held dual office. He also served as a member of San Francisco Board of Supervisors.
Edward J. D. Nolan	Republican	January 2, 1911 – January 6, 1913	San Francisco	
Daniel Ferguson	Republican	January 6, 1913 – January 8, 1917	Alameda	
Daniel Ferguson	Progressive	January 6, 1913 – January 8, 1917	Alameda	
William R. Brackett	Independent	January 8, 1917 – January 6, 1919	Alameda	
Edgar S. Hurley	Republican	January 6, 1919 – January 8, 1923	Alameda	
Jacob Croter	Republican	January 8, 1923 – July 1, 1927	Alameda	Resigns to focus his time on being the City Treasurer of Oakland.
Vacant		July 1, 1927 – January 7, 1929	Alameda	
Walter W. Feeley	Republican	January 7, 1929 – January 2, 1933	Alameda	
Ford A. Chatters	Republican	January 2, 1933 – January 4, 1937	Kings, Tulare	
Gordon Hickman Garland	Democratic	January 4, 1937 – January 4, 1943	Kings, Tulare	
Walter J. Fourt	Republican	January 4, 1943 – January 6, 1947	Ventura	
John B. Cooke	Democratic	January 6, 1947 – January 5, 1953	Ventura	
Dorothy M. Donahoe	Democratic	January 5, 1953 – April 4, 1960	Kern	Died in office from pneumonia.
Vacant		April 4, 1960 – January 2, 1961	Kern	
Jack T. Casey	Democratic	January 2, 1961 – January 7, 1963	Kern	
Carley V. Porter	Democratic	January 7, 1963 – December 6, 1972	Los Angeles	Died in office.
Vacant		December 6, 1972 – June 5, 1973	Los Angeles	
Robert M. McLennan	Republican	June 5, 1973 – November 30, 1974	Los Angeles	Sworn in office after winning special election to fill the vacant seat left by Porter who died in office.
Paul V. Priolo	Republican	December 2, 1974 – November 30, 1980	Los Angeles, Ventura	
Marion W. La Follette	Republican	December 1, 1980 – November 30, 1990	Los Angeles, Ventura	
Marion W. La Follette	Republican	December 1, 1980 – November 30, 1990	Los Angeles	
Paula Boland	Republican	December 3, 1990 – November 30, 1996	Los Angeles	
Tom McClintock	Republican	December 2, 1996 – November 30, 2000	Los Angeles, Ventura	
Keith Richman	Republican	December 4, 2000 – November 30, 2006	Los Angeles, Ventura	
Cameron Smyth	Republican	December 4, 2006 – November 30, 2012	Los Angeles, Ventura	
Scott Wilk	Republican	December 3, 2012 – November 30, 2016	Los Angeles, Ventura	
Dante Acosta	Republican	December 5, 2016 – November 30, 2018	Los Angeles, Ventura	
Christy Smith	Democratic	December 3, 2018 – November 30, 2020	Los Angeles, Ventura	
Suzette Martinez Valladares	Republican	December 7, 2020 – November 30, 2022	Los Angeles, Ventura	
Steve Bennett	Democratic	December 5, 2022 – present	Ventura	

== Election results (1990–present) ==
=== 2024 ===
2024 California State Assembly 38th district election
Primary election
Party	Candidate	Votes	%
Democratic	Steve Bennett (incumbent)	51,657	61.6
Republican	Deborah Baber	32,233	38.4
Total votes		83,890	100.0
General election
Democratic	Steve Bennett (incumbent)	117,387	63.4
Republican	Deborah Baber	67,845	36.6
Total votes		185,232	100.0
Democratic hold			

=== 2022 ===
2022 California State Assembly 38th district election
Primary election
Party	Candidate	Votes	%
Democratic	Steve Bennett (incumbent)	54,690	59.7
Republican	Cole Brocato	33,352	36.4
No party preference	Daniel Wilson	3,506	3.8
Total votes		91,818	100.0
General election
Democratic	Steve Bennett (incumbent)	79,709	61.2
Republican	Cole Brocato	50,544	38.8
Total votes		130,253	100.0
Democratic hold			

=== 2020 ===
2020 California State Assembly 38th district election
Primary election
Party	Candidate	Votes	%
Republican	Suzette Martinez Valladares	39,481	31.8
Republican	Lucie Lapointe Volotzky	21,942	17.6
Democratic	Annie E. Cho	15,498	12.5
Democratic	Kelvin Driscoll	14,868	12.0
Democratic	Brandii Grace	14,387	11.6
Democratic	Dina Cervantes	10,900	8.8
Democratic	Susan M. Christopher	7,255	5.8
Total votes		124,331	100.0
General election
Republican	Suzette Martinez Valladares	149,201	76.1
Republican	Lucie Lapointe Volotzky	46,877	23.9
Total votes		196,078	100.0
Republican gain from Democratic			

=== 2018 ===
2018 California State Assembly 38th district election
Primary election
Party	Candidate	Votes	%
Republican	Dante Acosta (incumbent)	49,825	53.6
Democratic	Christy Smith	43,050	46.4
Total votes		92,875	100.0
General election
Democratic	Christy Smith	95,751	51.5
Republican	Dante Acosta (incumbent)	90,298	48.5
Total votes		186,049	100.0
Democratic gain from Republican			

=== 2016 ===
2016 California State Assembly 38th district election
Primary election
Party	Candidate	Votes	%
Democratic	Christy Smith	44,755	44.7
Republican	Dante Acosta	36,236	36.2
Republican	Tyler Izen	10,998	11.0
Republican	Jarrod R. Degonia	8,215	8.2
Total votes		100,204	100.0
General election
Republican	Dante Acosta	102,977	52.9
Democratic	Christy Smith	91,801	47.1
Total votes		194,778	100.0
Republican hold			

=== 2014 ===
2014 California State Assembly 38th district election
Primary election
Party	Candidate	Votes	%
Republican	Scott Wilk (incumbent)	32,550	66.9
Democratic	Jorge Salomon Fuentes	16,082	33.1
Total votes		48,632	100.0
General election
Republican	Scott Wilk (incumbent)	63,249	66.3
Democratic	Jorge Salomon Fuentes	32,095	33.7
Total votes		95,344	100.0
Republican hold			

=== 2012 ===
2012 California State Assembly 38th district election
Primary election
Party	Candidate	Votes	%
Republican	Scott Wilk	20,230	32.1
Democratic	Edward Headington	19,608	31.1
Republican	Patricia McKeon	14,025	22.2
Republican	Paul B. Strickland	9,182	14.6
Total votes		63,045	100.0
General election
Republican	Scott Wilk	100,069	56.9
Democratic	Edward Headington	75,864	43.1
Total votes		175,933	100.0
Republican hold			

=== 2010 ===
2010 California State Assembly 38th district election
Party	Candidate	Votes	%
Republican	Cameron Smyth (incumbent)	83,854	56.7
Democratic	Diana G. Shaw	55,062	37.3
Libertarian	Peggy Christensen	9,015	6.0
Total votes		147,931	100.0
Republican hold			

=== 2008 ===
2008 California State Assembly 38th district election
Party	Candidate	Votes	%
Republican	Cameron Smyth (incumbent)	103,761	55.0
Democratic	Carole Lutness	84,936	45.0
Total votes		188,697	100.0
Republican hold			

=== 2006 ===
2006 California State Assembly 38th district election
Party	Candidate	Votes	%
Republican	Cameron Smyth	70,193	56.6
Democratic	Lyn Shaw	46,926	37.7
Libertarian	Peggy L. Christensen	7,116	5.7
Total votes		124,235	100.0
Republican hold			

=== 2004 ===
2004 California State Assembly 38th district election
Party	Candidate	Votes	%
Republican	Keith Richman (incumbent)	106,834	61.2
Democratic	Brian Joseph Davis	67,747	38.8
Total votes		174,581	100.0
Republican hold			

=== 2002 ===
2002 California State Assembly 38th district election
Party	Candidate	Votes	%
Republican	Keith Richman (incumbent)	64,757	60.9
Democratic	Paula L. Calderon	37,626	35.3
Libertarian	Karl Lembke	4,099	3.8
Total votes		106,482	100.0
Republican hold			

=== 2000 ===
2000 California State Assembly 38th district election
Party	Candidate	Votes	%
Republican	Keith Richman	74,581	51.0
Democratic	Jon M. Lauritzen	64,732	44.2
Libertarian	Philip Baron	7,033	4.8
Total votes		146,346	100.0
Republican hold			

=== 1998 ===
1998 California State Assembly 38th district election
Party	Candidate	Votes	%
Republican	Tom McClintock (incumbent)	78,417	100.0
Total votes		78,417	100.0
Republican hold			

=== 1996 ===
1996 California State Assembly 38th district election
Party	Candidate	Votes	%
Republican	Tom McClintock	71,597	55.5
Democratic	Jon M. Lauritzen	51,274	39.8
Natural Law	Virginia F. Neuman	6,021	4.7
Total votes		128,892	100.0
Republican hold			

=== 1994 ===
1994 California State Assembly 38th district election
Party	Candidate	Votes	%
Republican	Paula Boland (incumbent)	74,382	67.1
Democratic	Josh A. Arce	28,699	25.9
Green	Charles Wilken	7,748	7.0
Total votes		110,829	100.0
Republican hold			

=== 1992 ===
1992 California State Assembly 38th district election
Party	Candidate	Votes	%
Republican	Paula Boland (incumbent)	78,770	53.7
Democratic	Howard Cohen	59,742	40.7
Libertarian	Devin Cutler	8,250	5.6
Total votes		146,762	100.0
Republican hold			

=== 1990 ===
1990 California State Assembly 38th district election
Party	Candidate	Votes	%
Republican	Paula Boland	50,496	53.0
Democratic	Irene F. Allert	41,578	43.6
Peace and Freedom	Charles D. Najbergier	3,268	3.4
Total votes		95,342	100.0
Republican hold			

== See also ==
- California State Assembly
- California State Assembly districts
- Districts in California
