= Scott Wilk =

American politician

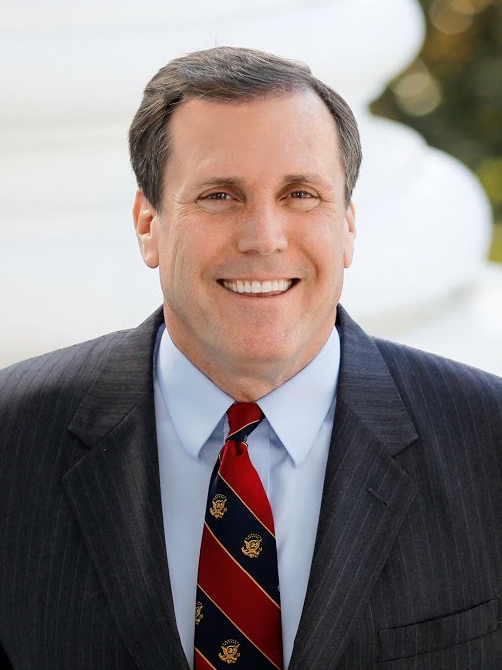

Minority Leader of the California Senate
- In office January 20, 2021 – December 5, 2022
- Preceded by: Shannon Grove
- Succeeded by: Brian Jones

Member of the California Senate from the 21st district
- In office December 5, 2016 – November 30, 2024
- Preceded by: Sharon Runner
- Succeeded by: Monique Limón (redistricting)

Member of the California State Assembly from the 38th district
- In office December 3, 2012 – November 30, 2016
- Preceded by: Cameron Smyth
- Succeeded by: Dante Acosta

Personal details
- Born: Scott Thomas Wilk; March 16, 1959 (age 67) Lancaster, California, U.S.
- Party: Republican
- Spouse: Vanessa Safoyan (m. 1985)
- Children: 2
- Education: California State University, Bakersfield (BA)

Scott Thomas Wilk Sr. (born March 16, 1959) is an American politician who served as the California State Senate minority leader from January 20, 2021 until December 5, 2022. He is a Republican who previously represented the 21st district, encompassing Antelope Valley, Victor Valley, and most of the Santa Clarita Valley. Prior to his election to the Senate, he served two terms in the California State Assembly. He was also a College of the Canyons Trustee.

== Background ==
Wilk earned his B.A. in political science from California State University, Bakersfield. He has served on the board of directors of the Henry Mayo Newhall Memorial Hospital Foundation and the Santa Clarita Valley Chamber of Commerce’s Legislative Committee. He is a member of the Simi Valley Chamber of Commerce and a past member of the Granada Hills Rotary Club.

Wilk was appointed to the Santa Clarita College District Board of Trustees on August 23, 2006. He was re-elected in November 2007 and November 2011. He also worked as a small business owner, ran a communications firm, and was a former legislative staffer.

== Career ==
=== California State Assembly ===
Wilk was elected to represent the 38th Assembly District on November 5, 2012. He received 56.9% of the vote. Wilk was re-elected in 2014, receiving 66.3% of the vote. While in the Assembly, Wilk served on the following committees: Budget Committee (Sub 4 - State Administration), the Governmental Organization Committee, and the Joint Committee on Arts.

While in the Assembly, Wilk was the principal co-author of the California Film and Television Job Retention and Promotion Act. He also co-authored a $420 million tax incentive that helped land a $60 billion aerospace contract expected to create 6,500 new jobs in the High Desert. In 2014, Scott was selected by the non-partisan, non-profit State Legislative Leaders Foundation to attend the Emerging Leaders Program held at the University of Virginia.

=== California State Senate ===
In California State Senate, Wilk is the vice-chair of the Governmental Organization committee. On January 20, 2021, Wilk was elected as the Senate Republican Leader.

== Elections ==
=== 2014 California State Assembly ===
California's 38th State Assembly district election, 2014
Primary election
Party	Candidate	Votes	%
Republican	Scott Wilk (incumbent)	32,550	66.9
Democratic	Jorge Salomon Fuentes	16,082	33.1
Total votes		48,632	100.0
General election
Republican	Scott Wilk (incumbent)	63,249	66.3
Democratic	Jorge Salomon Fuentes	32,095	33.7
Total votes		95,344	100.0
Republican hold			

=== 2012 California State Assembly ===
California State Assembly election, 2012
Primary election
Party	Candidate	Votes	%
Republican	Scott Wilk	20,230	32.1
Democratic	Edward Headington	19,608	31.1
Republican	Patricia McKeon	14,025	22.2
Republican	Paul B. Strickland	9,182	14.6
Total votes		63,045	100.0
General election
Republican	Scott Wilk	100,069	56.9
Democratic	Edward Headington	75,864	43.1
Total votes		175,933	100.0
Republican hold			

== Endorsements ==
Unlike many Republicans, Wilk has garnered endorsements from organized labor. He has received an endorsement from AFSCME Local 3299 (American Federation of State, County, & Municipal Employees) and from other organizations such as the Armenian National Committee of America-Western Region (ANCA-WR), California Professional Firefighters, California ProLife Council, Gun Owners of California, National Rifle Association, PawPAC - California's Political Action Committee for Animals, and Peace Officers Research Association of California.

In 2020, Wilk was endorsed by The Santa Clarita Valley Signal, a news media organization owned by Richard Budman and his wife, Chris. In 2021, 'The Signal listed Wilk at Number 1 on its list of Santa Clarita Valley's most influential people.

== Personal life ==
Wilk and his wife, Vanessa, reside in Santa Clarita with their two dogs. They have two adult children, Scott, Jr. and Alison. After he left the legislature, Wilk was named a senior executive vice president of the Building Industry Association of Southern California representing development interests.

Wilk's wife, Vanessa, is a district director for California State Assembly member Tom Lackey. She is also the chair of the City of Santa Clarita's Arts Commission and a member of the board of directors of the Santa Clarita Valley Committee on Aging.

California Senate
Preceded by Shannon Grove	Minority Leader of the California Senate; 2021–2022	Succeeded by Brian Jones
