= Harold K. Levering =

American politician (1894–1967)

Harold Levering

Majority Leader of the California Assembly
- In office 1953–1955
- Preceded by: Randal F. Dickey
- Succeeded by: Richard H. McCollister

Member of the California State Assembly from the 60th district
- In office January 3, 1949 - January 7, 1963
- Preceded by: M. Philip Davis
- Succeeded by: Robert S. Stevens

Personal details
- Born: December 20, 1894 Snydersville, Pennsylvania
- Died: September 15, 1967 (aged 72) Los Angeles, California
- Party: Republican
- Spouse: Lucy May Dreher
- Children: 2

Military service
- Branch/service: United States Army
- Battles/wars: World War II

Harold Keiser Levering (December 20, 1894 – September 15, 1967) was an American politician and a Republican member of the California State Assembly, representing District 60 from 1949 to 1963. He served as majority leader of the assembly in 1953. The Levering Act of 1950 is named after him.
