= California Master Plan for Higher Education =

California education policy

The California Master Plan for Higher Education of 1960 established a framework for California's public postsecondary education system at a time when state officials anticipated a large increase in university enrollment as the baby boom generation came of age. The plan sought to make higher education available regardless of economic means while differentiating the functions of the University of California (UC), the state colleges that were later reorganized as the California State University (CSU), and the junior colleges that were later organized into the California Community Colleges (CCC) system. By assigning distinct missions to each segment, the plan sought to avoid duplication of programs, reduce costs, and coordinate the growth of higher education in the state.

The plan was developed by a team appointed by the Regents of the University of California and the California State Board of Education under Governor Pat Brown, with UC president Clark Kerr playing a leading role. The statutory framework implementing the plan was enacted as the Donahoe Higher Education Act, named for Assemblywoman Dorothy Donahoe, (Note: Various sources spell her name as Donohue, Donahue, and Donahoe.) one of the plan's foremost advocates, and signed into law by Brown on April 27, 1960.

== History ==
Before the development of the Master Plan in the 1960s, California had spent decades attempting to establish and reform public institutions. Progressive reformers in the early 20th century sought to reduce the influence of railroad companies over state politics and business and establish public institutions with broader civic purposes. California's rapidly growing and mobile population made it difficult to establish a permanent statewide public education system, while some residents opposed public taxation for education and favored leaving education to local or religious organizations. The state also faced difficulties in securing land and funding for public universities. The First Organic Act of 1866 authorized the establishment of a secular state college, while the Second Organic Act of 1868 established the University of California under the control of a Board of Regents.

In the 1950s, the state's legislators and academic administrators foresaw an approaching surge in university enrollment, due to the baby boom children coming of age. They needed a plan to be able to maintain educational quality in the face of growing demand. The underlying principles that they sought were:

- That some form of higher education ought to be available to all regardless of their economic means, and that academic progress should be limited only by individual proficiency; and
- differentiation of function so that each of the three systems would strive for excellence in different areas, so as to not waste public resources on duplicate efforts.

The original Master Plan was approved by the Regents and the State Board of Education and submitted to the Legislature in February 1960. In April of that year, the California Legislature passed the Donahoe Higher Education Act, which implemented several components of the plan as statutory law. However, California's Master Plan is more than a single statute. The 1960 Master Plan is embodied in several documents:

1. A study completed by the Master Plan Survey Team approved by the State Board of Education and the UC Board of Regents
2. The Donahoe Higher Education Act giving legal force to several key components of the plan
3. A constitutional amendment which established the Trustees of the California State Colleges (renamed the California State University in 1974).

== Purpose ==
Kerr stated that the goal of the Master Plan was to balance the "competing demands of fostering excellence and guaranteeing educational access for all."

The Master Plan achieved the following:

- It created a system that combined exceptional quality with broad access for students.
- It transformed a collection of uncoordinated and competing colleges and universities into a coherent system.
- It established a broad framework for higher education that encourages each of the three public higher education segments to concentrate on creating its own kind of excellence within its own particular set of responsibilities.
- And it acknowledged the vital role of the independent colleges and universities, envisioning higher education in California as a single continuum of educational opportunity, from small private colleges to large public universities.

According to the plan, the top one-eighth (12.5%) of graduating high school seniors would be guaranteed a place at a campus of the University of California tuition-free. The top one-third (33.3%) would be able to enter the California State University system. Junior colleges (later renamed "community colleges" in 1967) would accept any students "capable of benefiting from instruction." These percentages are now enforced by sliding scales equating grade point average and scores on the SAT or ACT, which are recalculated every year. No actual ranking of students in high schools is used as many schools do not rank students.

Graduates of the junior colleges would be guaranteed the right to transfer to the UC or CSU systems in order to complete bachelor's degrees. This practice was carried over from previous years before the plan was enacted; graduates from the junior colleges had traditionally been accepted as upper-division transfer students at the state colleges or UC campuses by virtue of their prior coursework. Finally, the plan established that the University of California would be the sole portion of the system charged with performing research, and would award master's and doctoral degrees in support of that mission. The Cal State system, in addition to awarding master's degrees, would be able to award joint doctorates with the UC.

The "California Idea"—California's tripartite system of public research universities, comprehensive 4-year undergraduate campuses, and open-access community colleges—has been highly influential, and many other states and even nations have imitated this structure. However, California higher education has had a poor record of college completion and four-year baccalaureate degree attainment. Subgroups such as Latinos and African Americans (whose demographics are large and growing) show even worsening statistics of degree attainment.

== Effects ==
The Master Plan meant that essentially, "anyone from anywhere in California could, if they worked hard enough, get a bachelor’s degree from one of the best universities in the country (and, therefore, in the world), almost free of charge."

The plan increased overall efficiency in the higher education system, as well as produced greater number of graduates at a lower per-student cost by removing redundancies. This was accomplished by clearly specifying the missions of each system segment, in addition to clarifying what "territory" belonged to each institution.

The plan established a "rational" planning process for the growth of the university systems. This displaced the state legislature's past tendency to introduce bills to establish new four-year universities in members' home districts, a kind of political pork. In his memoirs, Kerr highlighted the 1957 creation of California State University, Stanislaus, as a particularly egregious example of this tendency.

The plan was inspired in part by Kerr's pragmatic realization that not all institutions of higher education can or should become research universities. As Kerr explained in his memoirs: "The state did not need a higher education system where every component was intent on being another Harvard or Berkeley or Stanford." Faculty members at state colleges regarded them as "graveyards of disappointed expectations" and wished they were located at the research universities from which they had obtained their doctoral degrees. Therefore, the plan was intended to concentrate state resources at the top, rather than spreading them too thin among far too many would-be research universities.

Most other states were unable to restrain the ambitions of their various colleges and universities to become research universities and suffered from "a proliferation of doctoral and costly [sic] research programs". For example, Texas promoted too many colleges to university status during the 20th century, with the result that by 2009, only three of the state's universities had achieved the prestigious R1 classification assigned by the Carnegie Classification of Institutions of Higher Education to the most advanced American research universities. It was only in 2009 that Texas belatedly enacted House Bill 51 to specifically promote the development of nationally competitive research universities. By 2019, six more Texas universities had reached the R1 classification. In 2025, Texas surpassed California for the first time in terms of the number of R1 universities, with a total of 16 in contrast to only 14 in California.

By setting "rigid" boundaries for each segment of public higher education, the plan ensured the continued availability of a wide range of educational options for the types of students to be served by each segment. In contrast, mission creep continues to be a serious problem in several other states which failed to impose and effectively enforce such boundaries. For example, as of January 2021, the U.S. Department of Education no longer recognized the Nevada System of Higher Education as having any public community colleges under federal standards, after Nevada allowed its purported community colleges to create too many four-year programs during the 2010s and thereby allowed them to deviate too far from the traditional community college role. The result was that as of 2021, Nevada could not provide its workforce with enough technicians who traditionally earn two-year associate degrees at community colleges, and needed to import them from adjacent states like Arizona and California which still have actual community colleges.

The plan was the basis for a substantial surge in development in California higher education. Today, many credit the California universities for the place the state holds in the world economy, as well as bolstering its own economic makeup with great investment in high technology areas, such as Silicon Valley, biotechnology, and pharmaceuticals.

The plan has contributed to the massive economic contributions that the UC, CSU, and CCC systems have had to the state and its growth. According to a study by the Regents of California, the UC system is directly responsible for adding about $32.8 billion to the gross state product, which is about 1.8 percent of the total GSP, a key indicator of economic performance.

== Subsequent changes ==
In 1972, a review of the plan found that the basic structure was good, but that it should be changed slightly to accommodate the ideas of the time. For example, the review board suggested that weekend and evening programs should be expanded to serve “non-traditional” students, and that the plan should take advantage of then-new technologies such as educational television.

In 1978, Proposition 13, the People's Initiative to Limit Property Taxation, was enacted, causing free public education to be eliminated. (Since tuition was still banned by the Donahoe Act, per-unit enrollment fees were charged instead.)

The 1987 revision specifically recognized the contributions of the independent sector (i.e., private and nonprofit institutions) and made explicit provision to include the independent sector in the planning functions of the state's higher education system. It also established a policy to set the maximum award for Cal Grants in state law.

In 2005, the demand for high school and community college administrators brought about a widely debated exception to the existing differentiation of function between the CSU and UC systems. The awarding of doctoral degrees had originally been exclusive to the UC system, with the provision that the California State Universities could offer PhD degrees as "joint" degrees in combination with the University of California or an accredited private university. Under the provisions of SB 724, signed into law September 22, 2005, the campuses of the California State University were then able to directly offer a Doctor of Education degree (Ed.D) "focused on preparing administrative leaders". It was argued that this fulfilled the original purpose of many of the CSU campuses, which had been founded as normal schools to train teachers.

In 2010, the CSU was also given the authority to exclusively offer two more doctoral degrees: the Doctorate in Nursing (DNP) and Doctor of Physical Therapy (DPT).

When the Master Plan was first founded in 1960, post-secondary education enrollments were equally divided among 2-year and 4-year institutions. However, in 2010, due to a lack of funding, the framers of the Master Plan limited eligibility admission to UC and CSU. The cost-cutting move diverted a large number of students to 2-year institutions, which would still allow them to finish their lower division work and then transfer to a 4-year institution.

== See also ==
- California Postsecondary Education Commission
- California State University
- University of California
- California Community Colleges
- List of colleges and universities in California
