= James McCollister Farmstead =

- U.S. National Register of Historic Places
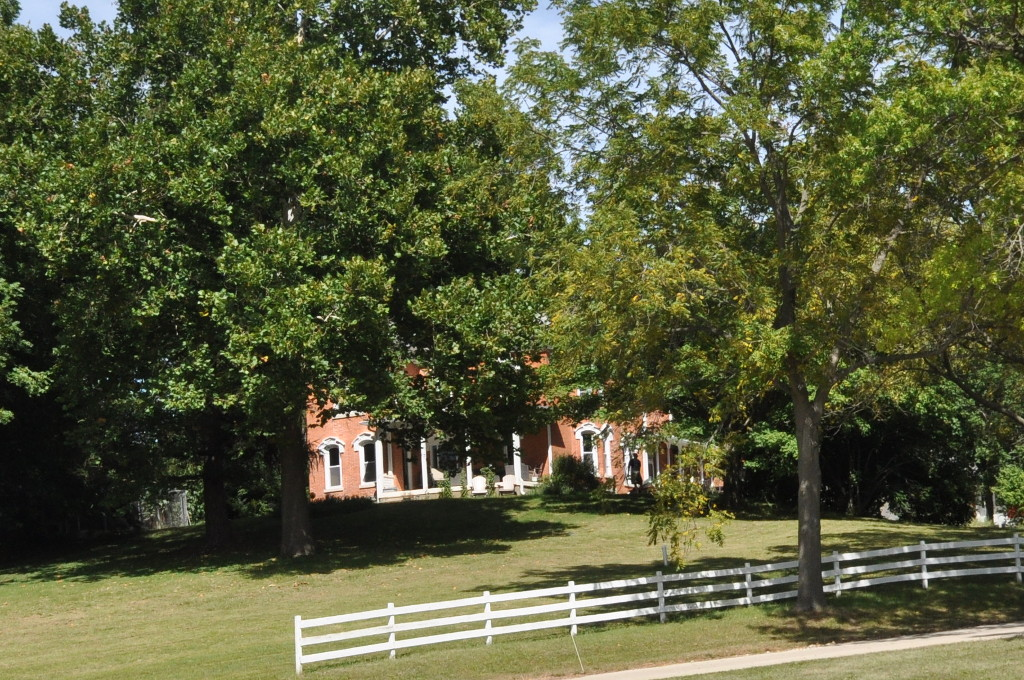

- Location within Iowa Location within the United States
- Location: Southeast of the junction of U.S. Routes 6 and 218, Iowa City, Iowa
- Coordinates: 41°38′03″N 91°31′45″W
- Area: 10 acres (4.0 ha)
- Built: 1864, 1880
- Architect: Borts, Lenz, & Gruber; J.J. Hotz
- NRHP reference No.: 76000776
- Added to NRHP: October 8, 1976

The James McCollister Farmstead, also known as the Old Charlie Showers Place, is a historic farmstead located in Iowa City, Iowa, United States. This property was first settled in 1840 by Philip Clark. He laid a claim on the land in 1836, but it was not available until after the Second Black Hawk Purchase of land from the Sauk, Meskwaki (Fox), and Ho-Chunk (Winnebago) tribes in 1837. The claim was secured by The Claim Association of Johnson County until the land was put up for sale in 1840. This was the first farm listed in Johnson County. Clark sold the farm to James McCollister in 1863, and he expanded it to 750 acres (300 ha). He also built the house and the barn, which are the subjects of the historical designation. The farm was owned by his descendants until 1974.

The first section of the two-story brick house was completed in 1864, with an expansion built onto the front in 1880. That gave the house an Italianate appearance. The wood-frame barn is built on a limestone foundation, just like the house. At the time of the historic nomination the foundation and fire pit for the smokehouse were in existence. The farmstead was listed on the National Register of Historic Places in 1976.
