= Walter J. Fourt =

American politician

Member of the California State Assembly from the 38th district
- In office January 4, 1943 - January 6, 1947
- Preceded by: Gordon Hickman Garland
- Succeeded by: John B. Cooke

Personal details
- Born: August 31, 1899 Fairfield, Iowa
- Died: July 4, 1977 (aged 77)
- Party: Republican

Military service
- Branch/service: United States Army
- Battles/wars: World War I

Walter J. Fourt (August 31, 1899 - July 4, 1977) served in the California State Assembly for the 38th district from 1943 to 1947 and during World War I he served in the United States Army.
