= Bruce E. Young =

American politician

Member of the California State Assembly from the 63rd district
- In office December 6, 1976 – November 30, 1984
- Preceded by: Robert M. McLennan
- Succeeded by: Wayne R. Grisham

Personal details
- Born: July 5, 1946 Chicago, Illinois, U.S.
- Died: October 1, 2022 (aged 76) Vancouver, Washington, U.S.
- Party: Democratic

Bruce E. Young (July 5, 1946 – October 1, 2022) was an American politician. He served as a Democratic member for the 63rd district of the California State Assembly.

== Life and career ==
Young was born in Chicago, Illinois. He was a reporter for Garden Grove Evening News.

In 1976, Young was elected to represent the 63rd district of the California State Assembly, succeeding Robert M. McLennan. He served until 1984, when he was succeeded by Wayne R. Grisham.

Young died on October 1, 2022 in Vancouver, Washington, at the age of 76.
