= Bruce Young (American football) =

American football coach

Current position
- Title: Running backs coach
- Team: Baker
- Conference: Heart of America Athletic Conference

Coaching career (HC unless noted)
- 1980: Norborne (MO)
- 1980: Marceline (MO)
- 1983–1999: Raymore–Peculiar (MO)
- 2000–2004: Baker (RB/ST)
- 2005–2009: Avila
- 2010–2016: Baker (RB/ST)

Head coaching record
- Overall: 12–42 (college); 184–92–1 (high school)

Bruce Young is an American former football coach. He served as the head football coach at the Avila University in Kansas City, Missouri from 2005 to 2009. He was second person to hold the post and his coaching record at Avila was 12–42. This ranks him second at Avila in terms of total wins and second at Avila in terms of winning percentage.

Young is a graduate of Northwest Missouri State University.
