= Robert M. McLennan =

American politician (1915–1983)

Member of the California State Assembly from the 63rd district
- In office December 2, 1974 - November 30, 1976
- Preceded by: Julian Dixon
- Succeeded by: Bruce E. Young

Member of the California State Assembly from the 38th district
- In office June 5, 1973 - November 30, 1974
- Preceded by: Carley V. Porter
- Succeeded by: Paul V. Priolo

Personal details
- Born: December 1, 1915 Shreveport, Louisiana
- Died: April 4, 1983 (aged 67) Pebble Beach, California
- Party: Republican
- Spouse: Frances C. Powers (m. 1940)
- Children: 4

Military service
- Branch/service: United States Army
- Battles/wars: World War II

Robert M. McLennan (December 1, 1915 – April 4, 1983) served in the California legislature for the 38th and 63rd District from 1973 to 1976. During World War II he served in the United States Army.
