= 2008 California State Assembly election =

- November 4, 2008

All 80 seats in the California State Assembly 41 seats needed for a majority
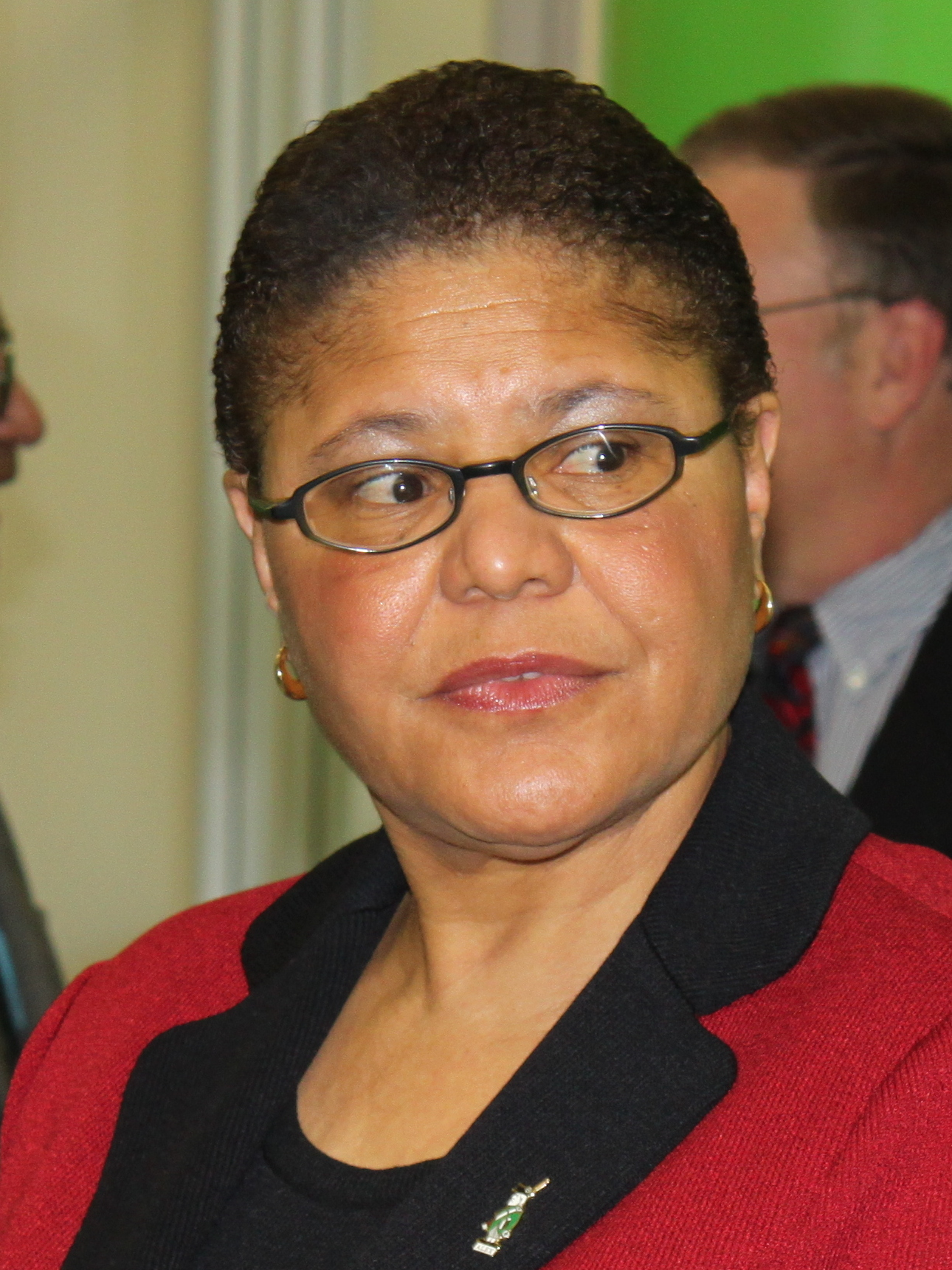

	Majority party	Minority party
Leader	Karen Bass	Michael Villines
Party	Democratic	Republican
Leader's seat	47th–Los Angeles	29th–Clovis
Last election	48 seats, 54.36%	32 seats, 43.48%
Seats won	51	29
Seat change	▲3	▼3
Popular vote	6,905,219	4,830,252
Percentage	57.80%	40.43%
Swing	▲3.44%	▼3.05%
- Democratic gain Republican gain Democratic hold Republican hold 40–50% 50–60% 60–70% 70–80% 80–90% >90% 50–60% 60–70% >90%
Speaker before election
Karen Bass
Democratic
Elected Speaker
Karen Bass
Democratic

The 2008 California State Assembly elections were held on November 4, 2008. Voters in all 80 of California's State Assembly districts voted for their representative. Other elections were also held on November 4. Only five seats changed parties: one to the Republican Party and four to the Democratic Party, which maintained a majority with 51 seats.

Of the 80 State Assembly districts, only about nine were considered truly competitive by political analysts.

== Overview ==
California State Assembly elections, 2008
Party	Votes	Percentage	Seats	+/–
Democratic	6,905,219	57.80%	51	+3
Republican	4,830,252	40.43%	29	–3
Libertarian	171,324	1.43%	0	0
Peace and Freedom	33,212	0.28%	0	0
Green	6,505	0.05%	0	0
Independent	27	0.00%	0	0
Valid votes	11,946,539	86.93%	—	—
Invalid or blank votes	1,796,638	13.07%	—	—
Totals	13,743,177	100.00%	80	—
Voter turnout	79.42%			

↓
51	29
Democratic	Republican

== Predictions ==
Source	Ranking	As of
Stateline	Safe D	October 15, 2008

== Results ==
Below are the final official results as reported by the Secretary of State.

=== District 1 ===
California's 1st State Assembly district election, 2008
Party	Candidate	Votes	%
Democratic	Wesley Chesbro	137,777	70.78
Republican	Jim Pell	56,870	29.22
Total votes		194,647	100.00
Turnout			77.39
Democratic hold			

=== District 2 ===
California's 2nd State Assembly district election, 2008
Party	Candidate	Votes	%
Republican	Jim Nielsen	118,149	65.40
Democratic	Paul Singh	62,510	34.60
Total votes		180,659	100.00
Turnout			75.54
Republican hold			

=== District 3 ===
California's 3rd State Assembly district election, 2008
Party	Candidate	Votes	%
Republican	Daniel Logue	104,755	55.51
Democratic	Michael Harrington	83,950	44.49
Total votes		188,705	100.00
Turnout			74.24
Republican hold			

=== District 4 ===
California's 4th State Assembly district election, 2008
Party	Candidate	Votes	%
Republican	Ted Gaines (incumbent)	166,736	100.00
Total votes		166,736	100.00
Turnout			56.63
Republican hold			

=== District 5 ===
California's 5th State Assembly district election, 2008
Party	Candidate	Votes	%
Republican	Roger Niello (incumbent)	101,888	54.22
Democratic	Danial Leahy	71,733	38.17
Peace and Freedom	Karen Martinez	14,295	7.61
Total votes		187,916	100.00
Turnout			71.91
Republican hold			

=== District 6 ===
California's 6th State Assembly district election, 2008
Party	Candidate	Votes	%
Democratic	Jared Huffman (incumbent)	145,142	69.45
Republican	Paul Lavery	50,053	23.95
Libertarian	Timothy Hannan	13,790	6.60
Total votes		208,985	100.00
Turnout			83.72
Democratic hold			

=== District 7 ===
California's 7th State Assembly district election, 2008
Party	Candidate	Votes	%
Democratic	Noreen Evans (incumbent)	128,279	71.95
Republican	Doris Gentry	50,020	28.05
Total votes		178,299	100.00
Turnout			80.89
Democratic hold			

=== District 8 ===
California's 8th State Assembly district election, 2008
Party	Candidate	Votes	%
Democratic	Mariko Yamada	112,524	66.03
Republican	Manuel Cosme	57,883	33.97
Total votes		170,407	100.00
Turnout			74.21
Democratic hold			

=== District 9 ===
California's 9th State Assembly district election, 2008
Party	Candidate	Votes	%
Democratic	Dave Jones (incumbent)	92,038	72.81
Republican	Mali Currington	26,622	21.06
Peace and Freedom	Gerald Frink	7,744	6.13
Total votes		126,404	100.00
Turnout			66.38
Democratic hold			

=== District 10 ===
California's 10th State Assembly district election, 2008
Party	Candidate	Votes	%
Democratic	Alyson Huber	88,242	46.66
Republican	Jack Sieglock	87,768	46.41
Libertarian	Janice Bonser	13,096	6.93
Total votes		189,106	100.00
Turnout			73.80
Democratic gain from Republican			

=== District 11 ===
California's 11th State Assembly district election, 2008
Party	Candidate	Votes	%
Democratic	Tom Torlakson	117,773	73.70
Republican	Elizabeth Hansen	42,023	26.30
Total votes		159,796	100.00
Turnout			77.60
Democratic hold			

=== District 12 ===
California's 12th State Assembly district election, 2008
Party	Candidate	Votes	%
Democratic	Fiona Ma (incumbent)	131,231	83.26
Republican	Conchita Applegate	26,380	16.74
Total votes		157,611	100.00
Turnout			67.87
Democratic hold			

=== District 13 ===
California's 13th State Assembly district election, 2008
Party	Candidate	Votes	%
Democratic	Tom Ammiano	162,977	83.35
Republican	Harmeet Dhillon	32,552	16.65
Total votes		195,529	100.00
Turnout			70.93
Democratic hold			

=== District 14 ===
California's 14th State Assembly district election, 2008
Party	Candidate	Votes	%
Democratic	Nancy Skinner	162,432	100.00
Total votes		162,432	100.00
Turnout			61.01
Democratic hold			

=== District 15 ===
California's 15th State Assembly district election, 2008
Party	Candidate	Votes	%
Democratic	Joan Buchanan	125,897	52.24
Republican	Abram Wilson	115,096	47.76
Total votes		240,993	100.00
Turnout			78.25
Democratic gain from Republican			

=== District 16 ===
California's 16th State Assembly district election, 2008
Party	Candidate	Votes	%
Democratic	Sandré Swanson (incumbent)	136,066	87.85
Republican	Jim Faison	18,817	12.15
Total votes		154,883	100.00
Turnout			67.49
Democratic hold			

=== District 17 ===
California's 17th State Assembly district election, 2008
Party	Candidate	Votes	%
Democratic	Cathleen Galgiani (incumbent)	77,525	66.26
Republican	Jack Mobley	39,480	33.74
Total votes		117,005	100.00
Turnout			63.78
Democratic hold			

=== District 18 ===
California's 18th State Assembly district election, 2008
Party	Candidate	Votes	%
Democratic	Mary Hayashi (incumbent)	115,780	77.51
Republican	Lou Filipovich	33,596	22.49
Total votes		149,376	100.00
Turnout			69.33
Democratic hold			

=== District 19 ===
California's 19th State Assembly district election, 2008
Party	Candidate	Votes	%
Democratic	Jerry Hill	124,157	72.99
Republican	Catherine Brinkman	39,132	23.01
Libertarian	Brian Perry	6,803	4.00
Total votes		170,092	100.00
Turnout			70.92
Democratic hold			

=== District 20 ===
California's 20th State Assembly district election, 2008
Party	Candidate	Votes	%
Democratic	Alberto Torrico (incumbent)	99,305	71.36
Republican	Jeffrey Wald	39,861	28.64
Total votes		139,166	100.00
Turnout			68.16
Democratic hold			

=== District 21 ===
California's 21st State Assembly district election, 2008
Party	Candidate	Votes	%
Democratic	Ira Ruskin (incumbent)	133,856	70.93
Republican	Annalisa Marie Temple	54,849	29.07
Total votes		188,705	100.00
Turnout			75.26
Democratic hold			

=== District 22 ===
California's 22nd State Assembly district election, 2008
Party	Candidate	Votes	%
Democratic	Paul Fong	109,249	76.14
Republican	Brent Oya	34,230	23.86
Total votes		143,479	100.00
Turnout			75.42
Democratic hold			

=== District 23 ===
California's 23rd State Assembly district election, 2008
Party	Candidate	Votes	%
Democratic	Joe Coto (incumbent)	81,523	76.62
Republican	Mark Patrosso	24,876	23.38
Total votes		106,399	100.00
Turnout			71.12
Democratic hold			

=== District 24 ===
California's 24th State Assembly district election, 2008
Party	Candidate	Votes	%
Democratic	Jim Beall (incumbent)	110,793	66.09
Republican	Doug McNea	56,835	33.91
Total votes		167,628	100.00
Turnout			75.78
Democratic hold			

=== District 25 ===
California's 25th State Assembly district election, 2008
Party	Candidate	Votes	%
Republican	Tom Berryhill (incumbent)	102,951	59.79
Democratic	Taylor White	69,223	40.21
Total votes		172,174	100.00
Turnout			70.39
Republican hold			

=== District 26 ===
California's 26th State Assembly district election, 2008
Party	Candidate	Votes	%
Republican	Bill Berryhill	70,620	51.71
Democratic	John Eisenhut	65,940	48.29
Total votes		136,560	100.00
Turnout			67.18
Republican hold			

=== District 27 ===
California's 27th State Assembly district election, 2008
Party	Candidate	Votes	%
Democratic	Bill Monning	127,102	65.97
Republican	Robert Murray	48,107	24.97
Libertarian	Mark Hinkle	17,435	9.05
Independent	Rexford Keyes (write-in)	27	0.01
Total votes		192,671	100.00
Turnout			78.71
Democratic hold			

=== District 28 ===
California's 28th State Assembly district election, 2008
Party	Candidate	Votes	%
Democratic	Anna Caballero (incumbent)	90,012	100.00
Total votes		90,012	100.00
Turnout			57.74
Democratic hold			

=== District 29 ===
California's 29th State Assembly district election, 2008
Party	Candidate	Votes	%
Republican	Michael Villines (incumbent)	110,230	65.88
Democratic	Humberto Avila	57,100	34.12
Total votes		167,330	100.00
Turnout			69.18
Republican hold			

=== District 30 ===
California's 30th State Assembly district election, 2008
Party	Candidate	Votes	%
Republican	Danny Gilmore	43,925	50.76
Democratic	Fran Florez	42,615	49.24
Total votes		86,540	100.00
Turnout			65.66
Republican gain from Democratic			

=== District 31 ===
California's 31st State Assembly district election, 2008
Party	Candidate	Votes	%
Democratic	Juan Arambula (incumbent)	64,620	69.52
Republican	Clifford Archer	28,310	30.46
Democratic	Christopher McCowan (write-in)	17	0.02
Total votes		92,947	100.00
Turnout			58.72
Democratic hold			

=== District 32 ===
California's 32nd State Assembly district election, 2008
Party	Candidate	Votes	%
Republican	Jean Fuller (incumbent)	120,628	69.16
Democratic	Virginia Martinez	53,789	30.84
Total votes		174,417	100.00
Turnout			72.72
Republican hold			

=== District 33 ===
California's 33rd State Assembly district election, 2008
Party	Candidate	Votes	%
Republican	Sam Blakeslee (incumbent)	114,316	63.84
Democratic	Robert Cuthbert	64,740	36.16
Total votes		179,056	100.00
Turnout			76.38
Republican hold			

=== District 34 ===
California's 34th State Assembly district election, 2008
Party	Candidate	Votes	%
Republican	Connie Conway	77,620	63.68
Democratic	Desmond Farrelly	44,263	36.32
Total votes		121,883	100.00
Turnout			68.89
Republican hold			

=== District 35 ===
California's 35th State Assembly district election, 2008
Party	Candidate	Votes	%
Democratic	Pedro Nava (incumbent)	119,613	67.25
Republican	Gregory Gandrud	58,244	32.75
Total votes		177,857	100.00
Turnout			75.51
Democratic hold			

=== District 36 ===
California's 36th State Assembly district election, 2008
Party	Candidate	Votes	%
Republican	Steve Knight	79,502	51.51
Democratic	Linda Jones	74,841	48.49
Total votes		154,343	100.00
Turnout			69.83
Republican hold			

=== District 37 ===
California's 37th State Assembly district election, 2008
Party	Candidate	Votes	%
Republican	Audra Strickland (incumbent)	102,087	52.10
Democratic	Ferial Masry	93,857	47.90
Total votes		195,944	100.00
Turnout			75.64
Republican hold			

=== District 38 ===
California's 38th State Assembly district election, 2008
Party	Candidate	Votes	%
Republican	Cameron Smyth (incumbent)	103,761	54.99
Democratic	Carole Lutness	84,936	45.01
Total votes		188,697	100.00
Turnout			72.78
Republican hold			

=== District 39 ===
California's 39th State Assembly district election, 2008
Party	Candidate	Votes	%
Democratic	Felipe Fuentes (incumbent)	59,495	73.73
Republican	Grady Martine	14,689	18.20
Green	John Lindblad	6,505	8.06
Total votes		80,689	100.00
Turnout			63.41
Democratic hold			

=== District 40 ===
California's 40th State Assembly district election, 2008
Party	Candidate	Votes	%
Democratic	Bob Blumenfield	72,360	58.56
Republican	Armineh Chelebian	32,973	26.68
Libertarian	Pamela Brown	18,239	14.76
Total votes		123,572	100.00
Turnout			67.67
Democratic hold			

=== District 41 ===
California's 41st State Assembly district election, 2008
Party	Candidate	Votes	%
Democratic	Julia Brownley (incumbent)	117,761	66.12
Republican	Mark Bernsley	60,350	33.88
Total votes		178,111	100.00
Turnout			70.52
Democratic hold			

=== District 42 ===
California's 42nd State Assembly district election, 2008
Party	Candidate	Votes	%
Democratic	Michael Feuer (incumbent)	142,456	76.07
Republican	Steven Sion	44,803	23.93
Total votes		187,259	100.00
Turnout			70.07
Democratic hold			

=== District 43 ===
California's 43rd State Assembly district election, 2008
Party	Candidate	Votes	%
Democratic	Paul Krekorian (incumbent)	91,863	67.87
Republican	Jane Barnett	43,492	32.13
Total votes		135,355	100.00
Turnout			67.59
Democratic hold			

=== District 44 ===
California's 44th State Assembly district election, 2008
Party	Candidate	Votes	%
Democratic	Anthony Portantino (incumbent)	102,896	63.68
Republican	Brian Fuller	49,246	30.48
Libertarian	Thomas Logan	9,446	5.85
Total votes		161,588	100.00
Turnout			69.87
Democratic hold			

=== District 45 ===
California's 45th State Assembly district election, 2008
Party	Candidate	Votes	%
Democratic	Kevin de León (incumbent)	70,869	82.05
Republican	Phillip Alexander	15,506	17.95
Total votes		86,375	100.00
Turnout			60.66
Democratic hold			

=== District 46 ===
California's 46th State Assembly district election, 2008
Party	Candidate	Votes	%
Democratic	John Pérez	51,556	84.89
Republican	Manuel Aldana	9,180	15.11
Total votes		60,736	100.00
Turnout			57.23
Democratic hold			

=== District 47 ===
California's 47th State Assembly district election, 2008
Party	Candidate	Votes	%
Democratic	Karen Bass (incumbent)	134,003	85.00
Republican	Lady Cage-Barile	23,642	15.00
Total votes		157,645	100.00
Turnout			68.20
Democratic hold			

=== District 48 ===
California's 48th State Assembly district election, 2008
Party	Candidate	Votes	%
Democratic	Mike Davis (incumbent)	75,279	87.08
Peace and Freedom	Lucilla Esguerra	11,173	12.92
Total votes		86,452	100.00
Turnout			59.41
Democratic hold			

=== District 49 ===
California's 49th State Assembly district election, 2008
Party	Candidate	Votes	%
Democratic	Mike Eng (incumbent)	62,418	67.17
Republican	Esthela Siegrist	30,511	32.83
Total votes		92,929	100.00
Turnout			59.11
Democratic hold			

=== District 50 ===
California's 50th State Assembly district election, 2008
Party	Candidate	Votes	%
Democratic	Hector De La Torre (incumbent)	75,082	100.00
Total votes		75,082	100.00
Turnout			55.12
Democratic hold			

=== District 51 ===
California's 51st State Assembly district election, 2008
Party	Candidate	Votes	%
Democratic	Curren Price (incumbent)	95,589	76.68
Republican	Reece Pollack	23,515	18.86
Libertarian	Carl Swinney	5,563	4.46
Total votes		124,667	100.00
Turnout			68.99
Democratic hold			

=== District 52 ===
California's 52nd State Assembly district election, 2008
Party	Candidate	Votes	%
Democratic	Isadore Hall, III	72,895	86.17
Republican	Gwen Patrick	11,700	13.83
Total votes		84,595	100.00
Turnout			58.86
Democratic hold			

=== District 53 ===
California's 53rd State Assembly district election, 2008
Party	Candidate	Votes	%
Democratic	Ted Lieu (incumbent)	127,117	67.33
Republican	Thomas Vidal	61,692	32.67
Total votes		188,809	100.00
Turnout			74.12
Democratic hold			

=== District 54 ===
California's 54th State Assembly district election, 2008
Party	Candidate	Votes	%
Democratic	Bonnie Lowenthal	95,350	57.13
Republican	Gabriella Holt	61,650	36.94
Libertarian	John Kling	9,896	5.93
Total votes		166,896	100.00
Turnout			71.62
Democratic hold			

=== District 55 ===
California's 55th State Assembly district election, 2008
Party	Candidate	Votes	%
Democratic	Warren Furutani (incumbent)	84,597	71.68
Republican	Edwin Williams	33,420	28.32
Total votes		118,017	100.00
Turnout			64.26
Democratic hold			

=== District 56 ===
California's 56th State Assembly district election, 2008
Party	Candidate	Votes	%
Democratic	Tony Mendoza (incumbent)	78,652	65.17
Republican	Roger Garrett	42,040	34.83
Total votes		120,692	100.00
Turnout			64.14
Democratic hold			

=== District 57 ===
California's 57th State Assembly district election, 2008
Party	Candidate	Votes	%
Democratic	Edward Hernandez (incumbent)	71,953	66.30
Republican	Victor Saldana	36,576	33.70
Total votes		108,529	100.00
Turnout			63.22
Democratic hold			

=== District 58 ===
California's 58th State Assembly district election, 2008
Party	Candidate	Votes	%
Democratic	Charles Calderon (incumbent)	85,086	70.35
Republican	Carlos Getino	35,867	29.65
Total votes		120,953	100.00
Turnout			65.24
Democratic hold			

=== District 59 ===
California's 59th State Assembly district election, 2008
Party	Candidate	Votes	%
Republican	Anthony Adams (incumbent)	91,366	51.01
Democratic	Donald Williamson	73,011	40.76
Libertarian	Maureen Keedy	14,744	8.23
Total votes		179,121	100.00
Turnout			70.33
Republican hold			

=== District 60 ===
California's 60th State Assembly district election, 2008
Party	Candidate	Votes	%
Republican	Curt Hagman	92,907	55.86
Democratic	Diane Singer	73,425	44.14
Total votes		166,332	100.00
Turnout			68.81
Republican hold			

=== District 61 ===
California's 61st State Assembly district election, 2008
Party	Candidate	Votes	%
Democratic	Norma Torres	61,004	60.52
Republican	Wendy Maier	33,284	33.02
Libertarian	Michael Mendez	6,517	6.46
Total votes		100,805	100.00
Turnout			65.60
Democratic hold			

=== District 62 ===
California's 62nd State Assembly district election, 2008
Party	Candidate	Votes	%
Democratic	Wilmer Carter (incumbent)	78,003	100.00
Total votes		78,003	100.00
Turnout			49.23
Democratic hold			

=== District 63 ===
California's 63rd State Assembly district election, 2008
Party	Candidate	Votes	%
Republican	Bill Emmerson (incumbent)	90,213	54.37
Democratic	Mark Westwood	75,719	45.63
Total votes		165,932	100.00
Turnout			68.20
Republican hold			

=== District 64 ===
California's 64th State Assembly district election, 2008
Party	Candidate	Votes	%
Republican	Brian Nestande	124,414	100.00
Total votes		124,414	100.00
Turnout			51.54
Republican hold			

=== District 65 ===
California's 65th State Assembly district election, 2008
Party	Candidate	Votes	%
Republican	Paul Cook (incumbent)	93,566	53.20
Democratic	Carl Wood	82,305	46.80
Total votes		175,871	100.00
Turnout			71.22
Republican hold			

=== District 66 ===
California's 66th State Assembly district election, 2008
Party	Candidate	Votes	%
Republican	Kevin Jeffries (incumbent)	95,093	57.94
Democratic	Grey Frandsen	69,040	42.06
Total votes		164,133	100.00
Turnout			72.77
Republican hold			

=== District 67 ===
California's 67th State Assembly district election, 2008
Party	Candidate	Votes	%
Republican	Jim Silva (incumbent)	108,502	62.31
Democratic	Steve Blount	65,622	37.69
Total votes		174,124	100.00
Turnout			65.95
Republican hold			

=== District 68 ===
California's 68th State Assembly district election, 2008
Party	Candidate	Votes	%
Republican	Van Tran (incumbent)	72,034	54.05
Democratic	Kenneth Arnold	61,239	45.95
Total votes		133,273	100.00
Turnout			60.93
Republican hold			

=== District 69 ===
California's 69th State Assembly district election, 2008
Party	Candidate	Votes	%
Democratic	Jose Solorio (incumbent)	50,809	71.05
Republican	Cameron Mangels	20,705	28.95
Total votes		71,514	100.00
Turnout			54.72
Democratic hold			

=== District 70 ===
California's 70th State Assembly district election, 2008
Party	Candidate	Votes	%
Republican	Chuck DeVore (incumbent)	114,556	57.78
Democratic	Michael Glover	83,709	42.22
Total votes		198,265	100.00
Turnout			67.01
Republican hold			

=== District 71 ===
California's 71st State Assembly district election, 2008
Party	Candidate	Votes	%
Republican	Jeff Miller	149,166	100.00
Total votes		149,166	100.00
Turnout			55.49
Republican hold			

=== District 72 ===
California's 72nd State Assembly district election, 2008
Party	Candidate	Votes	%
Republican	Michael Duvall (incumbent)	79,066	54.80
Democratic	John MacMurray	65,216	45.20
Total votes		144,282	100.00
Turnout			65.01
Republican hold			

=== District 73 ===
California's 73rd State Assembly district election, 2008
Party	Candidate	Votes	%
Republican	Diane Harkey	87,905	53.10
Democratic	Judy Jones	67,485	40.76
Libertarian	Andrew Favor	10,171	6.14
Total votes		165,561	100.00
Turnout			71.15
Republican hold			

=== District 74 ===
California's 74th State Assembly district election, 2008
Party	Candidate	Votes	%
Republican	Martin Garrick (incumbent)	90,383	50.59
Democratic	Brett Maxfield	72,126	40.37
Libertarian	Paul King	16,166	9.05
Total votes		178,675	100.00
Turnout			74.33
Republican hold			

=== District 75 ===
California's 75th State Assembly district election, 2008
Party	Candidate	Votes	%
Republican	Nathan Fletcher	98,758	52.13
Democratic	Darren Kasai	78,970	41.68
Libertarian	John Murphy	11,731	6.19
Total votes		189,459	100.00
Turnout			72.60
Republican hold			

=== District 76 ===
California's 76th State Assembly district election, 2008
Party	Candidate	Votes	%
Democratic	Lori Saldaña (incumbent)	113,754	64.23
Republican	Ralph Denney	55,128	31.13
Libertarian	Daniel Baehr	8,224	4.64
Total votes		177,106	100.00
Turnout			73.25
Democratic hold			

=== District 77 ===
California's 77th State Assembly district election, 2008
Party	Candidate	Votes	%
Republican	Joel Anderson (incumbent)	92,621	55.44
Democratic	Raymond Lutz	64,949	38.87
Libertarian	Rich Belitz	9,503	5.69
Total votes		167,073	100.00
Turnout			73.17
Republican hold			

=== District 78 ===
California's 78th State Assembly district election, 2008
Party	Candidate	Votes	%
Democratic	Marty Block	93,938	55.49
Republican	John McCann	75,350	44.51
Total votes		169,288	100.00
Turnout			72.07
Democratic gain from Republican			

=== District 79 ===
California's 79th State Assembly district election, 2008
Party	Candidate	Votes	%
Democratic	Mary Salas (incumbent)	74,051	69.48
Republican	Derrick Roach	32,526	30.52
Total votes		106,577	100.00
Turnout			66.31
Democratic hold			

=== District 80 ===
California's 80th State Assembly district election, 2008
Party	Candidate	Votes	%
Democratic	Manuel Perez	70,140	52.65
Republican	Gary Jeandron	63,085	47.35
Total votes		133,225	100.00
Turnout			69.41
Democratic gain from Republican			
