= 1996 California State Assembly election =

- November 5, 1996

All 80 seats in the California State Assembly 41 seats needed for a majority
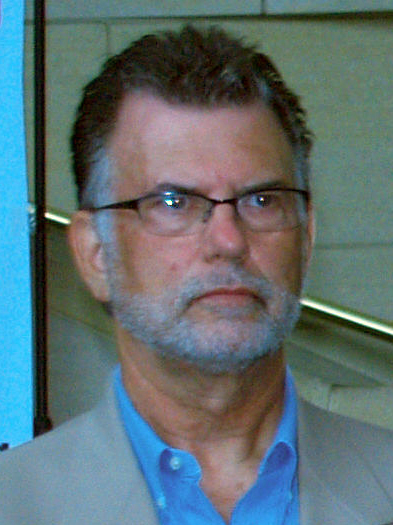

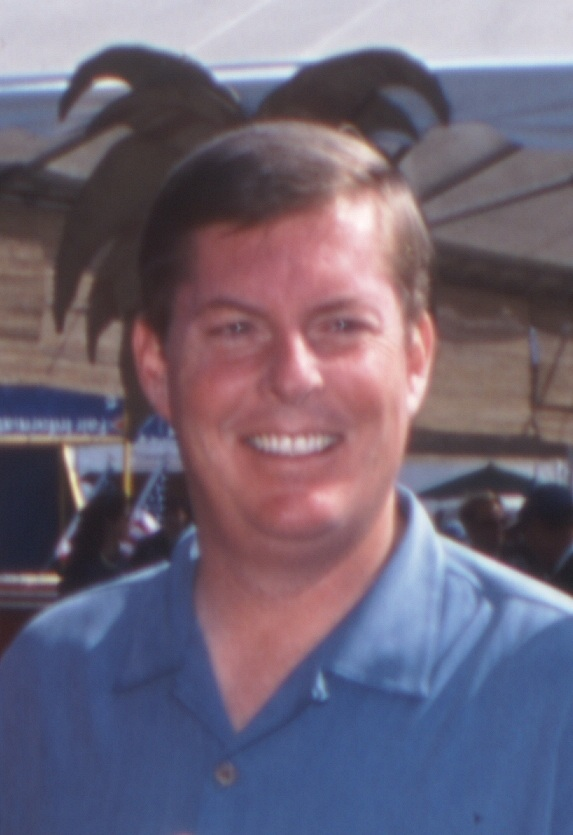
	Majority party	Minority party
Leader	Richard Katz (retired)	Curt Pringle
Party	Democratic	Republican
Leader's seat	39th–Sylmar	68th–Anaheim
Last election	39 seats, 47.95%	41 seats, 48.82%
Seats won	43	37
Seat change	▲4	▼4
Popular vote	4,587,998	4,277,553
Percentage	49.42%	46.07%
- Results: Democratic gain Democratic hold Republican hold Vote Share: 40–50% 50–60% 60–70% 70–80% 80–90% >90% 40–50% 50–60% 60–70% 70–80% >90%
Speaker before election
Curt Pringle
Republican
Elected Speaker
Cruz Bustamante
Democratic

The 1996 California State Assembly elections were held on November 5, 1996. California's State Assembly in its entirety comes up for election in even numbered years. Each seat has a two-year term and members are limited to three 2-year terms (six years). All 80 biennially elected seats in the Assembly were up for election this year. Democrats gained 4 seats, retaking control of the Assembly after narrowly losing control in 1994.

== Overview ==
California State Assembly elections, 1994
Party	Votes	Percentage	Incumbents	Open	Before	After	+/–
Democratic	4,587,998	49.42%	31	8	39	43	+4
Republican	4,277,553	46.07%	24	17	41	37	-4
Libertarian	142,577	1.54%	0	0	0	0	0
Natural Law	124,830	1.34%	0	0	0	0	0
Independent	51,863	0.56%	0	0	0	0	0
Write-ins	29,560	0.32%	0	0	0	0	0
Peace and Freedom	28,651	0.31%	0	0	0	0	0
Reform	21,199	0.23%	0	0	0	0	0
Green	12,851	0.14%	0	0	0	0	0
American Independent	7,475	0.08%	0	0	0	0	0
Invalid or blank votes	948,941	9.27%	—	—	—	—	—
Totals	10,233,498	100.00%	55	25	80	80	—

↓
43	37
Democratic	Republican

== Results ==
Final results from the California Secretary of State:

=== District 1 ===
California's 1st State Assembly district election, 1996
Party	Candidate	Votes	%
Democratic	Virginia Strom-Martin	87,800	52.87
Republican	Margie Handley	69,917	42.10
Natural Law	Harry K. Wrench III	8,341	5.02
Invalid or blank votes		6,681	3.87
Total votes		172,739	100.00
Democratic hold			

=== District 2 ===
California's 2nd State Assembly district election, 1996
Party	Candidate	Votes	%
Republican	Tom Woods (incumbent)	77,827	53.24
Democratic	John L. Growney	63,029	43.11
Libertarian	Al Swain	5,333	3.65
Invalid or blank votes		8,291	5.37
Total votes		154,480	100.00
Republican hold			

=== District 3 ===
California's 3rd State Assembly district election, 1996
Party	Candidate	Votes	%
Republican	Bernie Richter (incumbent)	94,765	61.57
Democratic	Irene Perry	59,159	38.43
Invalid or blank votes		9,957	6.06
Total votes		159,881	100.00
Republican hold			

=== District 4 ===
California's 4th State Assembly district election, 1996
Party	Candidate	Votes	%
Republican	Thomas "Rico" Oller	105,257	57.90
Democratic	Erike J. Young	76,193	41.91
No party	Karen Smith (write-in)	349	0.19
Total votes		181,799	100.00
Republican hold			

=== District 5 ===
California's 5th State Assembly district election, 1996
Party	Candidate	Votes	%
Republican	Barbara Alby (incumbent)	91,555	61.57
Democratic	Eileen Burke-Trent	57,152	38.43
Invalid or blank votes		13,047	8.15
Total votes		161,754	100.00
Republican hold			

=== District 6 ===
California's 6th State Assembly district election, 1996
Party	Candidate	Votes	%
Democratic	Kerry Mazzoni (incumbent)	109,139	64.91
Republican	David Crockett	49,367	29.36
Libertarian	Mary Jane Clifford	5,913	3.52
Peace and Freedom	Coleman C. Persily	3,729	2.22
Invalid or blank votes		13,289	7.31
Total votes		181,437	100.00
Democratic hold			

=== District 7 ===
California's 7th State Assembly district election, 1996
Party	Candidate	Votes	%
Democratic	Valerie K. Brown (incumbent)	89,864	61.70
Republican	Ken Larsen	48,114	33.04
Peace and Freedom	Al Liner	5,690	3.91
Natural Law	Alan Roy Barreca	1,977	1.36
Invalid or blank votes		8,799	5.70
Total votes		154,444	100.00
Democratic hold			

=== District 8 ===
California's 8th State Assembly district election, 1996
Party	Candidate	Votes	%
Democratic	Helen Thomson (incumbent)	75,010	55.79
Republican	Ed Schlenker	51,707	38.46
Libertarian	Harold J. Helbock	7,728	5.75
Invalid or blank votes		9,408	6.54
Total votes		143,853	100.00
Democratic hold			

=== District 9 ===
California's 9th State Assembly district election, 1996
Party	Candidate	Votes	%
Democratic	Deborah Ortiz	69,074	65.23
Republican	Richard Davis	30,769	29.06
Reform	Akili Jaye	3,558	3.36
Natural Law	Bruce B. Saunders	2,486	2.35
Invalid or blank votes		11,201	9.57
Total votes		117,088	100.00
Democratic hold			

=== District 10 ===
California's 10th State Assembly district election, 1996
Party	Candidate	Votes	%
Republican	Larry Bowler	76,654	48.92
Democratic	Matt Moretti	70,336	44.89
Reform	J. Bolton Phillips	9,691	6.19
Invalid or blank votes		11,214	6.88
Total votes		167,895	100.00
Republican hold			

=== District 11 ===
California's 11th State Assembly district election, 1996
Party	Candidate	Votes	%
Democratic	Tom Torlakson (incumbent)	81,820	60.02
Republican	Bill Maxfield	42,137	30.91
Natural Law	Eleanor V. Sheppard	12,375	9.08
Invalid or blank votes		11,548	7.81
Total votes		147,889	100.00
Democratic hold			

=== District 12 ===
California's 12th State Assembly district election, 1996
Party	Candidate	Votes	%
Democratic	Kevin Shelley (incumbent)	94,167	77.98
Republican	Torence Faulkner	26,595	22.02
Invalid or blank votes		24,108	16.64
Total votes		134,870	100.00
Democratic hold			

=== District 13 ===
California's 13th State Assembly district election, 1996
Party	Candidate	Votes	%
Democratic	Carole Migden (incumbent)	114,524	100.00
Invalid or blank votes		45,824	28.58
Total votes		160,348	100.00
Democratic hold			

=== District 14 ===
California's 14th State Assembly district election, 1996
Party	Candidate	Votes	%
Democratic	Dion Louise Aroner (incumbent)	90,539	66.28
Republican	William Muir	29,121	21.32
Green	Hank Chapot	12,851	9.41
Natural Law	Viola Boeson	4,091	2.99
Invalid or blank votes		18,805	12.10
Total votes		155,407	100.00
Democratic hold			

=== District 15 ===
California's 15th State Assembly district election, 1996
Party	Candidate	Votes	%
Republican	Lynne C. Leach (incumbent)	89,328	48.93
Democratic	Gail Murray	87,957	48.18
Natural Law	Martin Sproul	5,284	2.89
Invalid or blank votes		18,004	8.96
Total votes		190,573	100.00
Republican hold			

=== District 16 ===
California's 16th State Assembly district election, 1996
Party	Candidate	Votes	%
Democratic	Don Perata (incumbent)	82,842	78.32
Republican	Veronica A. Acosta	22,925	21.68
Invalid or blank votes		12,052	10.23
Total votes		117,819	100.00
Democratic hold			

=== District 17 ===
California's 17th State Assembly district election, 1996
Party	Candidate	Votes	%
Democratic	Michael Machado (incumbent)	54,607	51.95
Republican	Kevin Minnick	46,997	44.71
Libertarian	Tom Kohlheep	3,517	3.35
Invalid or blank votes		5,972	5.38
Total votes		111,093	100.00
Democratic hold			

=== District 18 ===
California's 18th State Assembly district election, 1996
Party	Candidate	Votes	%
Democratic	Michael Sweeney (incumbent)	89,122	100.00
Invalid or blank votes		36,608	30.23
Total votes		125,730	100.00
Democratic hold			

=== District 19 ===
California's 19th State Assembly district election, 1996
Party	Candidate	Votes	%
Democratic	Lou Papan (incumbent)	72,464	55.70
Republican	James "Jim" Tucker	48,715	37.44
Natural Law	Linda Marks	8,923	6.86
Invalid or blank votes			
Total votes		132,102	100.00
Democratic hold			

=== District 20 ===
California's 20th State Assembly district election, 1996
Party	Candidate	Votes	%
Democratic	Liz Figueroa (incumbent)	70,130	61.30
Republican	Anthony R. Smith	44,270	38.70
Invalid or blank votes		12,636	9.95
Total votes		127,036	100.00
Democratic hold			

=== District 21 ===
California's 21st State Assembly district election, 1996
Party	Candidate	Votes	%
Democratic	Ted Lempert (incumbent)	92,950	60.84
Republican	Theodore A. Laliotis	52,855	34.59
Natural Law	Ron Whitehurst	3,864	2.53
Libertarian	Christopher R. Inama	3,115	2.04
Invalid or blank votes		12,320	7.46
Total votes		165,104	100.00
Democratic hold			

=== District 22 ===
California's 22nd State Assembly district election, 1996
Party	Candidate	Votes	%
Democratic	Elaine Alquist	74,304	60.14
Republican	Karin Dowdy	44,505	36.02
Natural Law	Frank Strutner	4,738	3.83
Invalid or blank votes		14,526	10.52
Total votes		138,073	100.00
Democratic hold			

=== District 23 ===
California's 23rd State Assembly district election, 1996
Party	Candidate	Votes	%
Democratic	Mike Honda	54,370	73.39
Republican	Lisa M. Sutton	19,712	26.61
Invalid or blank votes		7,844	9.57
Total votes		81,926	100.00
Democratic hold			

=== District 24 ===
California's 24th State Assembly district election, 1996
Party	Candidate	Votes	%
Republican	Jim Cunneen (incumbent)	83,684	55.70
Democratic	Ed Foglia	59,504	39.60
Libertarian	Jon Petersen	7,059	4.70
Invalid or blank votes		14,996	9.08
Total votes		165,243	100.00
Republican hold			

=== District 25 ===
California's 25th State Assembly district election, 1996
Party	Candidate	Votes	%
Republican	George House (incumbent)	82,588	58.54
Democratic	Ed Elliott	54,033	38.30
Libertarian	Ronald C. A. Payne	4,450	3.15
Invalid or blank votes		10,364	6.86
Total votes		151,435	100.00
Republican hold			

=== District 26 ===
California's 26th State Assembly district election, 1996
Party	Candidate	Votes	%
Democratic	Dennis Cardoza	46,648	50.05
Republican	Tom Berryhill	46,562	49.95
Invalid or blank votes		8,355	6.23
Total votes		101,565	100.00
Democratic hold			

=== District 27 ===
California's 27th State Assembly district election, 1996
Party	Candidate	Votes	%
Democratic	Fred Keeley	86,099	56.91
Republican	Jim Davis	57,407	37.94
Natural Law	Sunshine W. McCarthy	7,786	5.15
Invalid or blank votes		9,049	5.84
Total votes		160,331	100.00
Democratic gain from Republican			

=== District 28 ===
California's 28th State Assembly district election, 1996
Party	Candidate	Votes	%
Republican	Peter Frusetta	53,649	48.86
Democratic	Lily Cervantes	51,888	47.26
Libertarian	Mark Hinkle	4,263	3.88
Invalid or blank votes		5,019	4.37
Total votes		114,819	100.00
Republican hold			

=== District 29 ===
California's 29th State Assembly district election, 1996
Party	Candidate	Votes	%
Republican	Chuck Poochigian (incumbent)	94,278	67.79
Democratic	Mike McGonigie	38,103	27.40
Natural Law	Nancy D. Adalian	6,699	4.82
Invalid or blank votes		11,004	7.33
Total votes		150,084	100.00
Republican hold			

=== District 30 ===
California's 30th State Assembly district election, 1996
Party	Candidate	Votes	%
Republican	Robert Prenter	37,024	56.56
No party	Brian Setencich (write-in) (incumbent)	26,988	41.20
No party	Linda C. Morales (write-in)	1,458	2.23
No party	Carolynda Stevensen (write-in)	11	0.02
Invalid or blank votes		19,937	23.35
Total votes		85,418	100.00
Republican hold			

=== District 31 ===
California's 31st State Assembly district election, 1996
Party	Candidate	Votes	%
Democratic	Cruz Bustamante (incumbent)	43,735	62.48
Republican	Nathan Short	22,053	31.51
Libertarian	Joseph H. Peacock II	2,935	4.19
Natural Law	Joni Mamicki	1,273	1.82
Invalid or blank votes		7,024	9.12
Total votes		77,020	100.00
Democratic hold			

=== District 32 ===
California's 32nd State Assembly district election, 1996
Party	Candidate	Votes	%
Republican	Roy Ashburn	86,790	67.03
Democratic	John F. Hulpke	38,191	29.50
Libertarian	Steve Zinn	4,498	3.47
Invalid or blank votes		5,322	3.95
Total votes		134,801	100.00
Republican hold			

=== District 33 ===
California's 33rd State Assembly district election, 1996
Party	Candidate	Votes	%
Republican	Tom J. Bordonaro, Jr.	84,568	57.95
Democratic	Betty Sanders	52,334	35.86
Libertarian	Gary L. Kirkland	5,268	3.61
Natural Law	Katherine R. Baker	3,753	2.57
Invalid or blank votes		8,703	5.63
Total votes		154,626	100.00
Republican hold			

=== District 34 ===
California's 34th State Assembly district election, 1996
Party	Candidate	Votes	%
Republican	Keith Olberg (incumbent)	76,248	65.29
Democratic	Lionel M. Dew	40,534	34.71
Invalid or blank votes		10,351	8.14
Total votes		127,133	100.00
Republican hold			

=== District 35 ===
California's 35th State Assembly district election, 1996
Party	Candidate	Votes	%
Republican	Brooks Firestone	101,014	66.04
Democratic	Aneesh K. Lele	44,531	29.11
Natural Law	Miriam Hospodar	7,415	4.85
Invalid or blank votes		11,203	6.82
Total votes		164,163	100.00
Republican hold			

=== District 36 ===
California's 36th State Assembly district election, 1996
Party	Candidate	Votes	%
Republican	George C. Runner	78,383	64.18
Democratic	David Cochran	43,746	35.82
Invalid or blank votes		14,111	10.36
Total votes		136,240	100.00
Republican hold			

=== District 37 ===
California's 37th State Assembly district election, 1996
Party	Candidate	Votes	%
Republican	Nao Takasugi (incumbent)	73,167	59.72
Democratic	Jens Herrera	49,341	40.28
Invalid or blank votes		8,633	6.56
Total votes		131,141	100.00
Republican hold			

=== District 38 ===
California's 38th State Assembly district election, 1996
Party	Candidate	Votes	%
Republican	Tom McClintock	71,597	55.55
Democratic	Jon M. Lauritzen	51,274	39.78
Natural Law	Virginia F. Neuman	6,021	4.67
Invalid or blank votes		14,262	9.96
Total votes		143,154	100.00
Republican hold			

=== District 39 ===
California's 39th State Assembly district election, 1996
Party	Candidate	Votes	%
Democratic	Tony Cardenas	41,798	71.67
Libertarian	Ollie M. McCaulley	16,522	28.33
Invalid or blank votes		7,437	11.31
Total votes		66,757	100.00
Democratic hold			

=== District 40 ===
California's 40th State Assembly district election, 1996
Party	Candidate	Votes	%
Democratic	Bob Hertzberg	51,960	58.98
Republican	H. R. "Ron" Culver	27,248	30.93
Libertarian	Kelley L. Ross	6,985	7.93
Natural Law	David L. Cossak	1,899	2.16
Invalid or blank votes		12,637	12.55
Total votes		100,729	100.00
Democratic hold			

=== District 41 ===
California's 41st State Assembly district election, 1996
Party	Candidate	Votes	%
Democratic	Sheila Kuehl (incumbent)	85,151	55.24
Republican	Mark Boon Benhard	58,613	38.02
Peace and Freedom	John Honigsfeld	4,479	2.91
Libertarian	Phil Baron	3,827	2.48
Natural Law	Marys Small	2,078	1.35
Invalid or blank votes		17,378	10.13
Total votes		171,526	100.00
Democratic hold			

=== District 42 ===
California's 42nd State Assembly district election, 1996
Party	Candidate	Votes	%
Democratic	Wally Knox (incumbent)	87,256	65.57
Republican	Adam Ross	37,921	28.50
Libertarian	Eric Michael Fine	5,699	4.28
Natural Law	Herbert Paul	2,203	1.66
Invalid or blank votes		20,047	13.09
Total votes		153,126	100.00
Democratic hold			

=== District 43 ===
California's 43rd State Assembly district election, 1996
Party	Candidate	Votes	%
Democratic	Scott Wildman	49,452	48.35
Republican	John Geramion	49,260	48.16
Libertarian	Willard Michlin	3,562	3.48
Invalid or blank votes		11,211	9.88
Total votes		113,485	100.00
Democratic gain from Republican			

=== District 44 ===
California's 44th State Assembly district election, 1996
Party	Candidate	Votes	%
Democratic	Jack Scott	72,591	52.97
Republican	Bill Hoge (incumbent)	60,124	43.87
Libertarian	Ted Brown	4,324	3.16
Invalid or blank votes		11,352	7.85
Total votes		148,391	100.00
Democratic gain from Republican			

=== District 45 ===
California's 45th State Assembly district election, 1996
Party	Candidate	Votes	%
Democratic	Antonio Villaraigosa (incumbent)	40,332	78.24
Peace and Freedom	Jaime Luis Gomez	11,219	21.76
Invalid or blank votes		11,361	15.08
Total votes		62,912	100.00
Democratic hold			

=== District 46 ===
California's 46th State Assembly district election, 1996
Party	Candidate	Votes	%
Democratic	Louis Caldera (incumbent)	22,605	77.50
Republican	Andrew Kim	6,562	22.50
Invalid or blank votes		5,518	15.91
Total votes		34,685	100.00
Democratic hold			

=== District 47 ===
California's 47th State Assembly district election, 1996
Party	Candidate	Votes	%
Democratic	Kevin Murray (incumbent)	86,763	79.87
Republican	Jonathan Leonard	17,616	16.22
Libertarian	Bob Weber	4,252	3.91
Invalid or blank votes		16,851	13.43
Total votes		125,482	100.00
Democratic hold			

=== District 48 ===
California's 48th State Assembly district election, 1996
Party	Candidate	Votes	%
Democratic	Roderick "Rod" Wright	46,134	100.00
Invalid or blank votes		15,142	24.71
Total votes		61,276	100.00
Democratic hold			

=== District 49 ===
California's 49th State Assembly district election, 1996
Party	Candidate	Votes	%
Democratic	Diane Martinez (incumbent)	49,804	69.25
Republican	Jay T. Imperial	22,120	30.75
Invalid or blank votes		9,006	11.13
Total votes		80,930	100.00
Democratic hold			

=== District 50 ===
California's 50th State Assembly district election, 1996
Party	Candidate	Votes	%
Democratic	Martha M. Escutia	35,312	82.97
Republican	Gladys O. Miller	7,246	17.03
Invalid or blank votes		5,079	10.68
Total votes		47,637	100.00
Democratic hold			

=== District 51 ===
California's 51st State Assembly district election, 1996
Party	Candidate	Votes	%
Democratic	Edward Vincent (incumbent)	58,333	73.22
Republican	Anthony Clarke	21,334	26.78
Invalid or blank votes		11,888	12.98
Total votes		91,555	100.00
Democratic hold			

=== District 52 ===
California's 52nd State Assembly district election, 1996
Party	Candidate	Votes	%
Democratic	Carl Washington (incumbent)	52,081	84.57
Republican	Robert Pullen-Miles	9,503	15.43
Invalid or blank votes		9,676	13.58
Total votes		71,260	100.00
Democratic hold			

=== District 53 ===
California's 53rd State Assembly district election, 1996
Party	Candidate	Votes	%
Democratic	Debra Bowen (incumbent)	88,238	57.67
Republican	Dan Walker	64,761	42.33
Invalid or blank votes		13,460	8.10
Total votes		166,459	100.00
Democratic hold			

=== District 54 ===
California's 54th State Assembly district election, 1996
Party	Candidate	Votes	%
Republican	Steven T. Kuykendall	66,421	50.66
Democratic	Gerrie Schipske	64,695	49.34
Invalid or blank votes		12,307	8.56
Total votes		143,423	100.00
Republican hold			

=== District 55 ===
California's 55th State Assembly district election, 1996
Party	Candidate	Votes	%
Democratic	E. "Dick" Floyd (incumbent)	50,116	74.23
Republican	Ronald Hayes	17,401	25.77
Invalid or blank votes		10,894	13.89
Total votes		78,411	100.00
Democratic hold			

=== District 56 ===
California's 56th State Assembly district election, 1996
Party	Candidate	Votes	%
Democratic	Sally M. Havice	54,455	49.37
Republican	Richard Lambros	52,376	47.48
Libertarian	Arthur M. Hays	3,478	3.15
Invalid or blank votes		11,691	9.59
Total votes		122,000	100.00
Democratic gain from Republican			

=== District 57 ===
California's 57th State Assembly district election, 1996
Party	Candidate	Votes	%
Democratic	Martin Gallegos (incumbent)	46,841	69.69
Republican	Jim Kleinpell	20,370	30.31
Invalid or blank votes		8,626	11.37
Total votes		75,837	100.00
Democratic hold			

=== District 58 ===
California's 58th State Assembly district election, 1996
Party	Candidate	Votes	%
Democratic	Grace Napolitano (incumbent)	54,710	61.27
Republican	Albert J. Nunez	27,678	31.00
Libertarian	John P. McCready	6,900	7.73
Invalid or blank votes		9,574	9.68
Total votes		98,862	100.00
Democratic hold			

=== District 59 ===
California's 59th State Assembly district election, 1996
Party	Candidate	Votes	%
Republican	Bob Margett (incumbent)	72,438	58.42
Democratic	Brent A. Decker	51,551	41.58
Invalid or blank votes		15,816	11.31
Total votes		123,989	100.00
Republican hold			

=== District 60 ===
California's 60th State Assembly district election, 1996
Party	Candidate	Votes	%
Republican	Gary Miller (incumbent)	56,462	52.70
Democratic	Susan Amaya	50,664	47.29
No party	Jeff Hays (write-in)	8	0.01
Invalid or blank votes		12,629	10.54
Total votes		119,763	100.00
Republican hold			

=== District 61 ===
California's 61st State Assembly district election, 1996
Party	Candidate	Votes	%
Republican	Fred Aguiar (incumbent)	44,314	55.01
Democratic	Paul Vincent Avila	32,445	40.27
Libertarian	Michael Alan Piltch	3,800	4.72
Invalid or blank votes		7,691	4.31
Total votes		88,250	100.00
Republican hold			

=== District 62 ===
California's 62nd State Assembly district election, 1996
Party	Candidate	Votes	%
Democratic	Joe Baca (incumbent)	47,064	64.28
Republican	Glenn Elsemann	26,148	35.72
Invalid or blank votes		6,209	7.82
Total votes		79,521	100.00
Democratic hold			

=== District 63 ===
California's 63rd State Assembly district election, 1996
Party	Candidate	Votes	%
Republican	Bill Leonard	78,351	62.82
Democratic	Wilma Strinati	46,365	37.18
Invalid or blank votes		13,025	9.46
Total votes		137,741	100.00
Republican hold			

=== District 64 ===
California's 64th State Assembly district election, 1996
Party	Candidate	Votes	%
Republican	Rod Pacheco	56,002	54.14
Democratic	Grace Slocum	43,336	41.89
Libertarian	Phil Turner	3,868	3.74
No party	Arthur Johnson (write-in)	236	0.23
Invalid or blank votes		3,944	3.67
Total votes		107,386	100.00
Republican hold			

=== District 65 ===
California's 65th State Assembly district election, 1996
Party	Candidate	Votes	%
Republican	Brett Granlund (incumbent)	66,573	56.64
Democratic	Shirley A. Morton	45,559	38.76
Natural Law	Douglas R. Wallack	5,344	4.55
No party	David William O'Brien (write-in)	63	0.05
Invalid or blank votes		9,269	7.31
Total votes		146,808	100.00
Republican hold			

=== District 66 ===
California's 66th State Assembly district election, 1996
Party	Candidate	Votes	%
Republican	Bruce Thompson (incumbent)	91,676	62.12
Democratic	Patty Hockersmith	50,594	34.29
Libertarian	Bill Reed	5,298	3.59
Invalid or blank votes		8,341	5.36
Total votes		155,909	100.00
Republican hold			

=== District 67 ===
California's 67th State Assembly district election, 1996
Party	Candidate	Votes	%
Republican	Scott Baugh (incumbent)	80,013	56.32
Democratic	Cliff Brightman	54,085	38.07
Reform	Donald W. Rowe	7,950	5.60
No party	Wayne Dapser (write-in)	14	0.01
Invalid or blank votes		16,043	10.15
Total votes		158,105	100.00
Republican hold			

=== District 68 ===
California's 68th State Assembly district election, 1996
Party	Candidate	Votes	%
Republican	Curt Pringle (incumbent)	56,493	58.70
Democratic	Audrey L. Gibson	39,754	41.30
Invalid or blank votes		6,403	0.00
Total votes		102,650	100.00
Republican hold			

=== District 69 ===
California's 69th State Assembly district election, 1996
Party	Candidate	Votes	%
Republican	Jim Morrissey (incumbent)	24,545	48.12
Democratic	Lou Correa	24,452	47.94
Natural Law	Larry G. Engwall	2,010	3.94
Invalid or blank votes		2,231	4.19
Total votes		53,238	100.00
Republican hold			

=== District 70 ===
California's 70th State Assembly district election, 1996
Party	Candidate	Votes	%
Republican	Marilyn C. Brewer (incumbent)	89,306	61.47
Democratic	Shirley W. Palley	45,746	31.49
Libertarian	Gene Beed	6,221	4.28
Natural Law	Paul R. Fisher	4,017	2.76
Invalid or blank votes		16,106	9.98
Total votes		161,396	100.00
Republican hold			

=== District 71 ===
California's 71st State Assembly district election, 1996
Party	Candidate	Votes	%
Republican	William J. Campbell (incumbent)	107,783	70.62
Democratic	Jack Roberts	44,848	29.38
Invalid or blank votes		15,380	9.15
Total votes		178,011	100.00
Republican hold			

=== District 72 ===
California's 72nd State Assembly district election, 1996
Party	Candidate	Votes	%
Republican	Dick Ackerman (incumbent)	103,800	100.00
Invalid or blank votes		37,839	26.72
Total votes		141,639	100.00
Republican hold			

=== District 73 ===
California's 73rd State Assembly district election, 1996
Party	Candidate	Votes	%
Republican	Bill Morrow (incumbent)	85,586	63.26
Democratic	Robert D. Wilberg	36,775	27.18
Natural Law	Catherine Carter	12,935	9.56
Invalid or blank votes		10,536	7.22
Total votes		145,832	100.00
Republican hold			

=== District 74 ===
California's 74th State Assembly district election, 1996
Party	Candidate	Votes	%
Republican	Howard Kaloogian (incumbent)	79,942	56.94
Independent	Fred L. Clayton	51,863	36.94
Libertarian	Douglas F. Webb	8,584	6.11
Invalid or blank votes		14,539	9.36
Total votes		154,928	100.00
Republican hold			

=== District 75 ===
California's 75th State Assembly district election, 1996
Party	Candidate	Votes	%
Republican	Jan Goldsmith (incumbent)	106,944	71.62
Democratic	Adrian S. Kwiatkowski	35,805	23.98
Natural Law	William S. Cowling III	6,573	4.40
Invalid or blank votes		15,494	9.40
Total votes		164,816	100.00
Republican hold			

=== District 76 ===
California's 76th State Assembly district election, 1996
Party	Candidate	Votes	%
Democratic	Susan Davis (incumbent)	70,799	53.05
Republican	Bob Trettin	59,128	44.30
Peace and Freedom	Christine Freel	3,534	2.65
Invalid or blank votes		7,570	5.37
Total votes		141,031	100.00
Democratic hold			

=== District 77 ===
California's 77th State Assembly district election, 1996
Party	Candidate	Votes	%
Republican	Steve Baldwin (incumbent)	68,475	55.96
Democratic	Janet Gastil	48,714	39.81
Libertarian	Elizabeth Meyers	5,178	4.23
Invalid or blank votes		7,198	5.58
Total votes		129,565	100.00
Republican hold			

=== District 78 ===
California's 78th State Assembly district election, 1996
Party	Candidate	Votes	%
Democratic	Howard Wayne	69,587	48.68
Republican	Tricia Hunter	65,440	45.78
American Independent	Nathan E. Johnson	7,475	5.23
No party	Elizabeth Lenardi (write-in)	453	0.32
Invalid or blank votes		9,624	6.43
Total votes		152,579	100.00
Democratic hold			

=== District 79 ===
California's 79th State Assembly district election, 1996
Party	Candidate	Votes	%
Democratic	Denise Moreno Ducheny (inc.)	48,509	71.50
Republican	Bob Divine	19,338	28.50
Invalid or blank votes		5,380	7.32
Total votes		73,227	100.00
Democratic hold			

=== District 80 ===
California's 80th State Assembly district election, 1996
Party	Candidate	Votes	%
Republican	Jim Battin (incumbent)	61,864	56.71
Democratic	Steve Clute	44,480	40.77
Natural Law	John R. Borchert	2,745	2.52
Invalid or blank votes		6,072	5.27
Total votes		115,161	100.00
Republican hold			

== See also ==
- California State Senate
- California State Senate elections, 1996
- California State Assembly Districts
- California state elections, 1996
- Districts in California
- Political party strength in California
- Political party strength in U.S. states
