= California's 30th State Assembly district =

American legislative district

Current assemblymember
Dawn Addis; D–Morro Bay
- Population (2020): 474,319
- Demographics: 62.54% White; 1.67% Black; 23.79% Latino; 5.35% Asian; 0.37% Native American; 0.35% Hawaiian/Pacific Islander; 0.61% other; 5.33% remainder of multiracial

California's 30th State Assembly district is one of 80 California State Assembly districts. It is currently represented by Democrat Dawn Addis of Morro Bay. On December 21, 2021 the new Assembly District 30 Map has been finalized. It includes part of Santa Cruz County, part of Monterey County, and part of San Luis Obispo County.

== District profile ==
The district encompasses many of the seaside towns of the Central Coast, spanning parts Monterey, San Luis Obispo, and Santa Cruz Counties.

Monterey County – 34.11%

- Carmel-by-the-Sea
- Monterey
- Seaside
- Pacific Grove

San Luis Obispo County - 90.20%

- Atascadero
- Paso Robles
- San Luis Obispo

Santa Cruz County – 27.35%

- Aptos
- Capitola
- Soquel

== Election results from statewide races ==
Year	Office	Results
2021	Recall	No 66.6 – 33.4%
2020	President	Biden 68.0 – 29.7%
2018	Governor	Newsom 64.5 – 35.5%
2018	Senator	Feinstein 50.1 – 49.9%
2016	President	Clinton 66.7 – 27.3%
2016	Senator	Harris 58.8 – 41.2%
2014	Governor	Brown 67.2 – 32.8%
2012	President	Obama 67.0 – 30.9%
2012	Senator	Feinstein 68.4 – 31.6%

== List of assembly members representing the district ==
Due to redistricting, the 30th district has been moved around different parts of the state. The current iteration resulted from the 2021 redistricting by the California Citizens Redistricting Commission.

Assembly Members	Party	Years served	Counties represented	Notes
E. C. Kalben	Republican	January 5, 1885 – January 3, 1887	San Francisco	
Joseph Burnett	Republican	January 3, 1887 – January 7, 1889	San Francisco	
J. D. Long	Democratic	January 7, 1889 – January 5, 1891	San Francisco	
Thomas J. Tully	Republican	January 5, 1891 – January 2, 1893	San Francisco	
Bernard Conway	Democratic	January 2, 1893 – January 7, 1895	San Francisco	
John O'Day	Democratic	January 7, 1895 – January 4, 1897	San Francisco	
H. M. Kelly	Republican	January 4, 1897 – January 2, 1899	San Francisco	
Louis A. Devoto	Republican	January 2, 1899 – January 1, 1901	San Francisco	
George J. McLaughlin	Democratic	January 1, 1901 – January 5, 1903	San Francisco	
Abner McMahon	Democratic	January 5, 1903 – January 2, 1905	San Francisco	
Francis McNamara	Republican	January 2, 1905 – January 7, 1907	San Francisco	
James A. Wilson	Republican	January 7, 1907 – January 4, 1909	San Francisco	
George J. Black	Democratic	January 4, 1909 – January 2, 1911	San Francisco	
John E. Mullally	Republican Party	January 2, 1911 – January 15, 1912	San Francisco	Died during an armed robbery being shot in the stomach and back, while trying to get the revolver from one of the three robbers during a struggle.
Vacant		January 15, 1912 – January 6, 1913	San Francisco	
Edward J. D. Nolan	Republican Party	January 6, 1913 – January 4, 1915	San Francisco	
Joseph Edmund Marron	Progressive	January 4, 1915 – January 8, 1917	San Francisco	
Clarence W. Morris	Republican	January 8, 1917 – January 5, 1925	San Francisco	
Robert B. Fry	Republican	January 5, 1925 – January 5, 1931	San Francisco	
J.P. Hayes	Republican	January 5, 1931 – January 2, 1933	San Francisco	
Frank Lee Crist	Republican	January 2, 1933 – January 7, 1935	Santa Clara	
H. Dewey Anderson	Republican	January 7, 1935 – January 4, 1937	Santa Clara	
Adron A. Beene	Republican	January 4, 1937 – January 2, 1939	Santa Clara	
Byrl Salsman	Republican	January 2, 1939 – January 4, 1943	Santa Clara	
Ralph M. Brown	Democratic	January 4, 1943 – September 19, 1961	Stanislaus	Resigned from the State Assembly.
Vacant		September 19, 1961 – January 30, 1962	Stanislaus	
John Veneman	Republican	January 30, 1962 – March 6, 1969	Stanislaus	Sworn in after winning the special election to fill the vacant left by his predecessor. He eventually resigned from the State Assembly to take a position for the Undersecretary, U.S. Department of Health, Education and Welfare.
John Veneman	Republican	January 30, 1962 – March 6, 1969	Stanislaus, San Joaquin	Sworn in after winning the special election to fill the vacant left by his predecessor. He eventually resigned from the State Assembly to take a position for the Undersecretary, U.S. Department of Health, Education and Welfare.
Vacant		March 6, 1969 – June 4, 1969	Stanislaus, San Joaquin	
Clare Berryhill	Republican	June 4, 1969 – January 4, 1971	Stanislaus, San Joaquin	Sworn in after winning the special election to fill in the vacant seat left by Veneman.
Ernest LaCoste	Democratic	January 4, 1971 – January 8, 1973	Stanislaus, San Joaquin	
John E. Thurman	Democratic	January 8, 1973 – November 30, 1974	Stanislaus, San Joaquin	
Kenneth L. Maddy	Republican	December 2, 1974 – November 30, 1978	Fresno, Madera, Mariposa, Merced	
Jim Costa	Democratic	December 4, 1978 – November 30, 1994	Fresno, Madera, Mariposa, Merced	
Jim Costa	Democratic	December 4, 1978 – November 30, 1994	Fresno, Madera, Kings, Merced	
Brian Setencich	Republican	December 5, 1994 – November 30, 1996	Fresno, Madera, Kings, Kern	
Robert Prenter	Republican	December 2, 1996 – November 30, 1998	Fresno, Madera, Kings, Kern	
Dean Florez	Democratic	December 7, 1998 – November 30, 2002	Fresno, Madera, Kings, Kern	
Nicole Parra	Democratic	December 2, 2002 – November 30, 2008	Fresno, Kern, Kings, Tulare	
Danny Gilmore	Republican	December 1, 2008 – November 30, 2010	Fresno, Kern, Kings, Tulare	
David Valadao	Republican	December 6, 2010 – November 30, 2012	Fresno, Kern, Kings, Tulare	
Luis Alejo	Democratic	December 3, 2012 – November 30, 2016	Monterey, San Benito, Santa Clara, Santa Cruz	
Anna Caballero	Democratic	December 5, 2016 – November 30, 2018	Monterey, San Benito, Santa Clara, Santa Cruz	
Robert Rivas	Democratic	December 3, 2018 – November 30, 2022	Monterey, San Benito, Santa Clara, Santa Cruz	Redistricted to the 29th district.
Dawn Addis	Democratic	December 5, 2022 – present	Monterey, San Luis Obispo, Santa Cruz	

== Election results (1990–present) ==
=== 2024 ===
2024 California State Assembly 30th district election
Primary election
Party	Candidate	Votes	%
Democratic	Dawn Addis (incumbent)	88,090	62.9
Republican	Dalila Epperson	52,036	37.1
Total votes		140,126	100.0
General election
Democratic	Dawn Addis (incumbent)	148,758	62.4
Republican	Dalila Epperson	89,570	37.6
Total votes		238,328	100.0
Democratic hold			

=== 2022 ===
2022 California State Assembly 30th district election
Primary election
Party	Candidate	Votes	%
Democratic	Dawn Addis	54,924	40.8
Republican	Vicki Nohrden	49,287	36.6
Democratic	Jon Wizard	14,090	10.5
Democratic	Zoë G. Carter	11,584	8.6
Democratic	John R. Drake	4,695	3.5
Total votes		134,580	100.0
General election
Democratic	Dawn Addis	115,770	60.0
Republican	Vicki Nohrden	77,079	40.0
Total votes		192,849	100.0
Democratic hold			

=== 2020 ===
2020 California State Assembly 30th district election
Primary election
Party	Candidate	Votes	%
Democratic	Robert Rivas (incumbent)	64,086	69.4
Republican	Gregory Swett	28,308	30.6
Total votes		92,394	100.0
General election
Democratic	Robert Rivas (incumbent)	123,617	69.6
Republican	Gregory Swett	53,928	30.4
Total votes		177,545	100.0
Democratic hold			

=== 2018 ===
2018 California State Assembly 30th district election
Primary election
Party	Candidate	Votes	%
Democratic	Robert Rivas	30,379	45.5
Republican	Neil G. Kitchens	20,099	30.1
Democratic	Peter Leroe-Muñoz	7,099	10.6
Democratic	Trina Coffman-Gomez	5,003	7.5
Democratic	Bill Lipe	4,217	6.3
Total votes		66,797	100.0
General election
Democratic	Robert Rivas	83,162	68.3
Republican	Neil G. Kitchens	38,719	31.8
Total votes		121,881	100.0
Democratic hold			

=== 2016 ===
2016 California State Assembly 30th district election
Primary election
Party	Candidate	Votes	%
Democratic	Anna Caballero	37,505	46.1
Democratic	Karina Cervantez Alejo	21,158	26.0
Republican	Georgia Acosta	12,662	15.6
Republican	John M. Nevill	9,949	12.2
Total votes		81,274	100.0
General election
Democratic	Anna Caballero	79,885	62.5
Democratic	Karina Cervantez Alejo	47,998	37.5
Total votes		127,883	100.0
Democratic hold			

=== 2014 ===
2014 California State Assembly 30th district election
Primary election
Party	Candidate	Votes	%
Democratic	Luis Alejo (incumbent)	25,441	58.9
Republican	Mark Starritt	17,730	41.1
Total votes		43,171	100.0
General election
Democratic	Luis Alejo (incumbent)	43,431	59.8
Republican	Mark Starritt	29,187	40.2
Total votes		72,618	100.0
Democratic hold			

=== 2012 ===
2012 California State Assembly 30th district election
Primary election
Party	Candidate	Votes	%
Democratic	Luis Alejo (incumbent)	29,136	58.7
Republican	Rob Bernosky	20,462	41.3
Total votes		49,598	100.0
General election
Democratic	Luis Alejo (incumbent)	79,141	65.4
Republican	Rob Bernosky	41,932	34.6
Total votes		121,073	100.0
Democratic gain from Republican			

=== 2010 ===
2010 California State Assembly 30th district election
Party	Candidate	Votes	%
Republican	David Valadao	37,392	60.6
Democratic	Fran Florez	24,386	39.4
Total votes		61,778	100.0
Republican hold			

=== 2008 ===
2008 California State Assembly 30th district election
Party	Candidate	Votes	%
Republican	Danny Gilmore	43,925	50.8
Democratic	Fran Florez	42,615	49.2
Total votes		86,540	100.0
Republican gain from Democratic			

=== 2006 ===
2006 California State Assembly 30th district election
Party	Candidate	Votes	%
Democratic	Nicole Parra (incumbent)	28,244	51.6
Republican	Danny Gilmore	26,527	48.4
Total votes		54,771	100.0
Democratic hold			

=== 2004 ===
2004 California State Assembly 30th district election
Party	Candidate	Votes	%
Democratic	Nicole Parra (incumbent)	42,953	55.0
Republican	Dean Gardner	35,084	45.0
Total votes		78,037	100.0
Democratic hold			

=== 2002 ===
2002 California State Assembly 30th district election
Party	Candidate	Votes	%
Democratic	Nicole Parra	26,586	50.3
Republican	Dean Gardner	26,320	49.7
Total votes		52,906	100.0
Democratic hold			

=== 2000 ===
2000 California State Assembly 30th district election
Party	Candidate	Votes	%
Democratic	Dean Florez (incumbent)	56,936	65.7
Republican	Kenneth D. Kay	29,669	34.3
Total votes		86,605	100.0
Democratic hold			

=== 1998 ===
1998 California State Assembly 30th district election
Party	Candidate	Votes	%
Democratic	Dean Florez	37,058	54.4
Republican	Robert Prenter (incumbent)	31,116	45.6
Total votes		68,174	100.0
Democratic gain from Republican			

=== 1996 ===
1996 California State Assembly 30th district election
Party	Candidate	Votes	%
Republican	Robert Prenter	37,024	56.6
No party	Brian Setencich (write-in) (incumbent)	26,988	41.2
No party	Linda C. Morales (write-in)	1,458	2.2
No party	Carolynda Stevensen (write-in)	11	0.0
Total votes		65,481	100.0
Republican hold			

=== 1994 ===
1994 California State Assembly 30th district election
Party	Candidate	Votes	%
Republican	Brian Setencich	35,940	52.2
Democratic	Bryn Batrich	32,901	47.8
Total votes		68,841	100.0
Republican gain from Democratic			

=== 1992 ===
1992 California State Assembly 30th district election
Party	Candidate	Votes	%
Democratic	Jim Costa (incumbent)	52,566	65.2
Republican	Gerald G. Hurt	28,048	34.8
Total votes		80,614	100.0
Democratic hold			

=== 1990 ===
1990 California State Assembly 30th district election
Party	Candidate	Votes	%
Democratic	Jim Costa (incumbent)	39,414	62.4
Republican	Gerald G. Hurt	23,793	37.6
Total votes		63,207	100.0
Democratic hold			

== See also ==
- California State Assembly
- California State Assembly districts
- Districts in California
