= Dawn Addis =

American politician (born 1972)

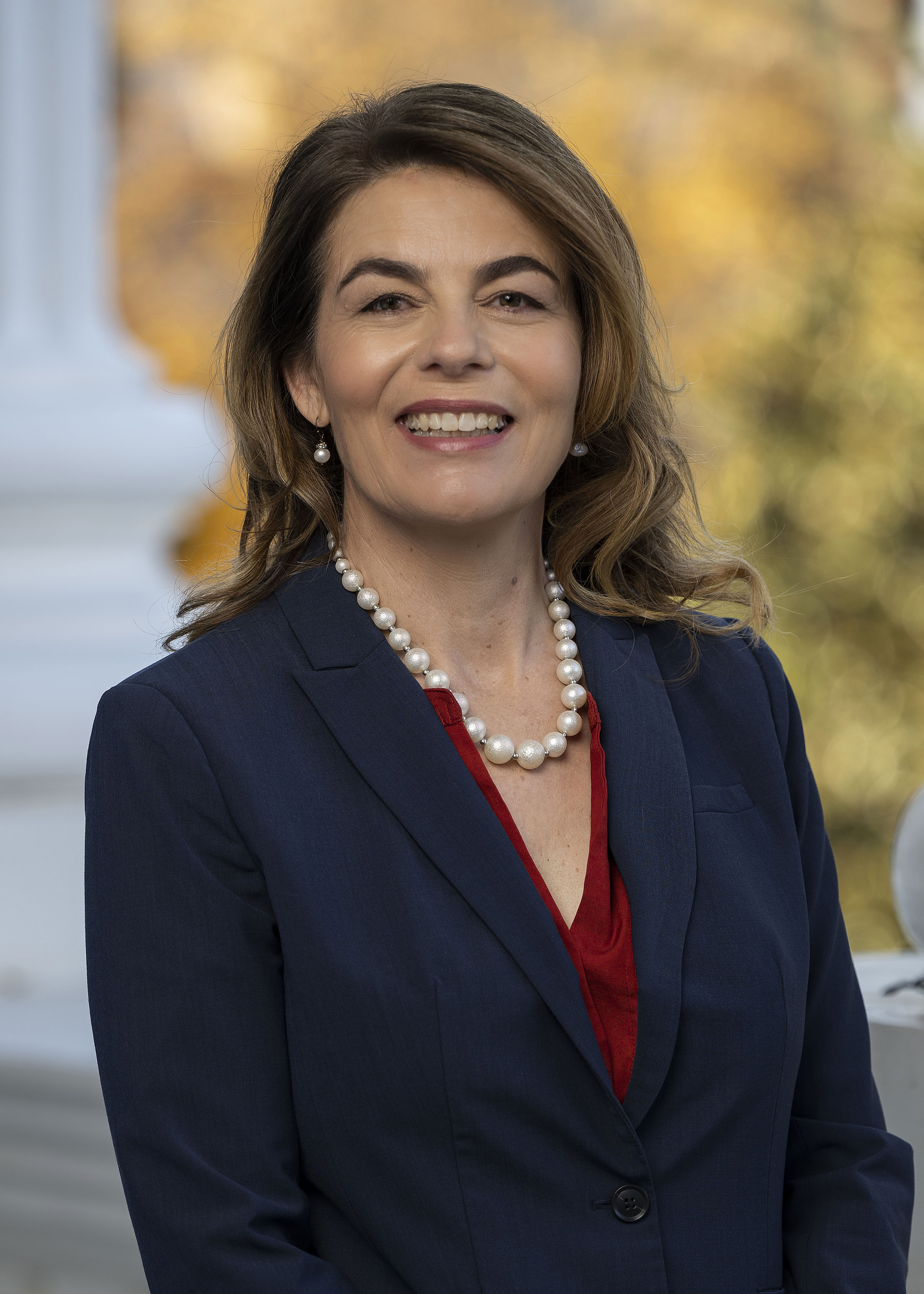
- Official portrait, 2022

Member of the California State Assembly from the 30th district
- Incumbent
- Assumed office December 5, 2022
- Preceded by: Robert Rivas (redistricting)

Personal details
- Born: July 12, 1972 (age 54) San Francisco, California
- Party: Democratic
- Spouse: Marcus
- Children: 2
- Education: San Francisco State University (BA, MS)Teaching credentials in elementary education, secondary education, and special education

Dawn Junea Addis (born July 12, 1972) is an American educator, activist, and politician serving as a member of the California State Assembly for the 30th district. Elected in November 2022, she assumed office on December 5, 2022, and was re-elected in 2024. Addis was the first Democrat from San Luis Obispo County elected to the California State Assembly since 1922, and the first woman to represent the 30th district. She is Chair of the Assembly Budget Subcommittee No. 1 on Health, Co-chair of the California Legislative Central Coast Caucus.

== Education ==
Addis earned a Bachelor of Arts degree in art education and Spanish and a Master of Arts in special education from San Francisco State University. In 2026, she received an honorary Doctor of Humane Letters from A.T. Still University of Health Sciences. She holds teaching credentials in elementary education, secondary art education, secondary Spanish, and special education, and is fluent in Spanish.

== Career ==
Addis worked as an educator in the San Luis Coastal Unified School District for 20 years, teaching special education and serving as an English learner intervention specialist at schools including Morro Elementary, Pacific Beach Elementary, San Luis Obispo High School, Pacheco Elementary, and Laguna Middle School. She served on the executive board of the San Luis Coastal Teachers Association.

In 2016, she co-founded the San Luis Obispo chapter of the Women's March, which drew a crowd of approximately 10,000 people at its inaugural march in 2017. She also served as a board member for the Planned Parenthood Central Coast Action Fund.

She was elected to the Morro Bay City Council in 2018 and served from 2019 to 2022, including as mayor pro tempore from 2019 to 2021.

In 2020, Addis ran for the California State Assembly against incumbent Republican Jordan Cunningham in Assembly District 35, which included all of San Luis Obispo County as well as voters in northern Santa Barbara County. Cunningham won with 55% of the vote to Addis's 45%.

In 2022, following the California Citizens Redistricting Commission's post-census redistricting, Assembly District 30 was redrawn to include parts of San Luis Obispo, Monterey, and Santa Cruz counties, Cunningham did not seek re-election. In the June 7, 2022 primary, Addis received 42% of the vote, followed by Vicki Nohrden with 35%, Jon Wizard with 11%, Zoë Carter with 9%, and John R. Drake with 4%. Addis defeated Nohrden in the November 8, 2022 general election, receiving 61% of the vote to Nohrden's 39%.

Addis was re-elected in 2024, defeating Republican Dalila Epperson with 62.4% of the vote. In the June 2, 2026 primary, Addis received 54.8% of the vote (83,505 votes), followed by Republican Shannon Kessler with 35.9% (54,649 votes) and Democrat Susannah Brown with 9.3% (14,220 votes). Addis and Kessler advanced to the November 3, 2026 general election. Addis faces Kessler in the November 3, 2026 general election.

== Tenure ==
In the California State Assembly, Addis serves as Chair of the Assembly Budget Subcommittee No. 1 on Health, which oversees eight state departments and approximately $175 billion in state healthcare spending. She served as Assistant Majority Leader for Policy and Research and is a member of the Assembly's Budget, Health, Business and Professions, and Insurance standing committees.

Addis is the co-founder and co-chair of the California Legislative Central Coast Caucus, a bi-cameral caucus formed to coordinate legislative work across both chambers of the state legislature on issues affecting the Central Coast region. She also chairs the Assembly Select Committee on Serving Students with Disabilities.

Addis was appointed by Assembly Speaker Robert Rivas as the Assembly's designee to the Ocean Protection Council. She also serves as a member of the Chumash Heritage National Marine Sanctuary Advisory Committee, and has been appointed to state working groups on the Public Liability, Diablo Canyon Power Plant, and Safe Drinking Water, Wildfire Prevention, Drought Preparedness, and Clean Air Bond Act of 2024.

== Legislation ==
Addis has authored legislation addressing housing affordability, healthcare access, environmental protection, education, and survivor rights. Her signed legislation includes:

- Assembly Bill 358 (2023), the California Community College Housing Act, which streamlined approval processes for community college student housing.
- Assembly Bill 452 (2023), the Justice for Survivors Act, which ended the civil statute of limitations for civil actions related to childhood sexual abuse.
- Assembly Bill 370 (2023), the Biliteracy Advancement Act, which supported multilingual learner education programs in California schools.
- Assembly Bill 2173 (2024), the Reducing Stigma in Education Act, which replaced the term "emotional disturbance" with "emotional disability" in California education code.
- Assembly Bill 2197 (2024), the Protect Our Coast and Oceans Act.
- Assembly Bill 3233 (2024), which restored local government authority over oil and gas operations, effectively reinstating the intent of Monterey County's Measure Z.
- Assembly Bill 1288 (2024), addressing environmental health workforce modernization.
- Assembly Bill 1008 (2024), authorizing 10 additional liquor licenses for San Luis Obispo County.

== Awards and recognition ==
During her time in the Assembly, Addis has received recognition from a range of California advocacy organizations and professional associations, including:

- 2026 Champion of Family Medicine, California Academy of Family Physicians
- 2026 Gun Sense Candidate distinction, Moms Demand Action
- Legislator of the Year recognitions from the California Faculty Association, SEIU-UHW, Disability Voices United, and Equality California
- Perfect voting record scores from the American Civil Liberties Union, the California League of Conservation Voters, Planned Parenthood of California, the Sierra Club California, the California Labor Federation, and the Alliance for Retired Americans

She holds an F rating from the NRA Political Victory Fund.

== Electoral history ==
=== Morro Bay City Council ===
2018 Morro Bay City Council election
Candidate	Votes	%
Dawn Addis	3,062	30.4
Jeff Heller	2,202	21.9
Betty Winholtz	2,163	21.5
Jan Goldman	1,794	17.8
Jesse Barron	844	8.4
Total votes	10,065	100.0

=== California State Assembly ===
2020 California State Assembly 35th district election
Primary election
Party	Candidate	Votes	%
Republican	Jordan Cunningham (incumbent)	85,029	56.8
Democratic	Dawn Addis	64,548	43.2
Total votes		149,577	100.0
General election
Republican	Jordan Cunningham (incumbent)	126,579	55.1
Democratic	Dawn Addis	103,206	44.9
Total votes		229,785	100.0
Republican hold			

2022 California State Assembly 30th district election
Primary election
Party	Candidate	Votes	%
Democratic	Dawn Addis	54,924	40.8
Republican	Vicki Nohrden	49,287	36.6
Democratic	Jon Wizard	14,090	10.5
Democratic	Zoë G. Carter	11,584	8.6
Democratic	John R. Drake	4,695	3.5
Total votes		134,580	100.0
General election
Democratic	Dawn Addis	115,770	60.0
Republican	Vicki Nohrden	77,079	40.0
Total votes		192,849	100.0
Democratic gain from Republican			

2024 California State Assembly 30th district election
Primary election
Party	Candidate	Votes	%
Democratic	Dawn Addis (incumbent)	88,090	62.9
Republican	Dalila Epperson	52,036	37.1
Total votes		140,126	100.0
General election
Democratic	Dawn Addis (incumbent)	148,758	62.4
Republican	Dalila Epperson	89,570	37.6
Total votes		238,328	100.0
Democratic hold			

2026 California State Assembly 30th district election
Primary election
Party	Candidate	Votes	%
Democratic	Dawn Addis (incumbent)	83,505	54.8
Republican	Shannon Kessler	54,649	35.9
Democratic	Susannah Brown	14,220	9.3
Total votes			100.0
Democratic hold			
