= Nicole Parra =

American attorney and politician

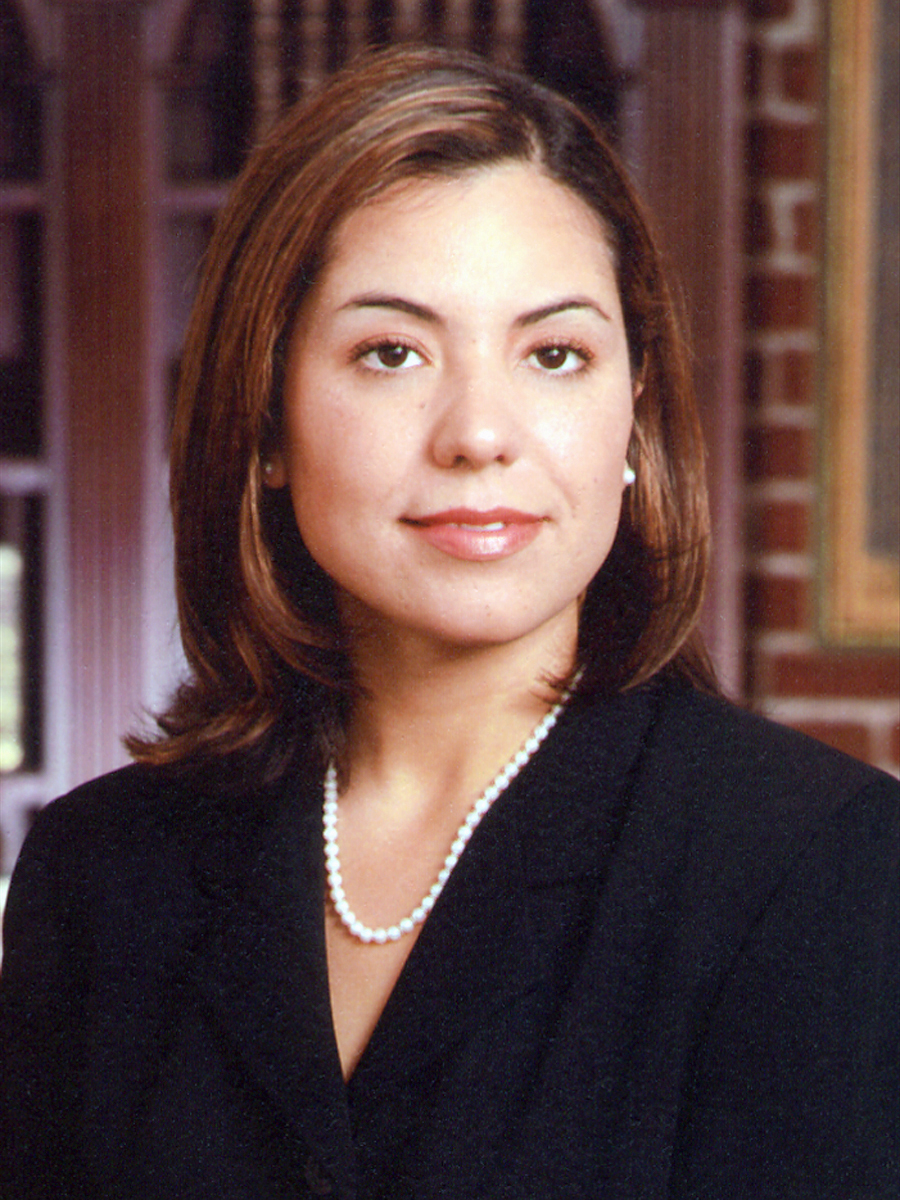

Member of the California State Assembly from the 30th district
- In office December 2, 2002 – November 30, 2008
- Preceded by: Dean Florez
- Succeeded by: Danny Gilmore

Personal details
- Born: Nicole Marie Parra; February 3, 1970 (age 56) Bakersfield, California, U.S.
- Party: Democratic
- Education: University of California, Berkeley (BA); Catholic University (JD)

Nicole M. Parra (born February 3, 1970) is an American attorney and politician who served as a member of the California State Assembly from 2002 to 2008. A Democrat, she represented the 30th Assembly district, which includes a portion of California's Central Valley.

== Early life and education ==
Parra was born in Bakersfield, California, and raised in Hanford, California. Her father, Pete, served on the Kern County Board of Supervisors and her mother works for the Bakersfield Adult School. After attending Highland High School, she graduated from the University of California, Berkeley in 1992 with a Bachelor of Arts in economics. In 1998, she earned a Juris Doctor from the Catholic University School of Law in Washington D.C.

== Career ==
Parra served as Congressman Cal Dooley's campaign manager in 2000 and as his District Director from 1998 to 2002.

=== California Assembly ===
Parra was elected to the Assembly in 2002 by a margin of 266 votes. She served as Chair of the Agriculture Committee. She also served on the Banking & Finance, Insurance, and Water Parks and Wildlife Committees. Parra's 2004 re-election campaign was endorsed by the California Farm Bureau.

In 2008 Parra was not eligible to seek a fourth term because of term limits. She chose to endorse her opponent from the 2006 campaign to replace her, Republican Danny Gilmore, over the Democratic party nominee, Shafter Mayor Fran Florez.

During her final months in office, Parra was kicked out of her Capitol office by then-Assembly Speaker Karen Bass after refusing to vote on a state spending bill.

=== Later career ===
In late January 2009, Parra accepted an appointment from Governor Arnold Schwarzenegger to be Director of the Governor's Regional Development Initiatives under the Business, Transportation and Housing Agency. On July 16, 2009, Parra announced that she would resign from the agency.

In 2010, Parra supported the candidacy of Carly Fiorina, a Republican, to the United States Senate.

In 2014 she started serving as an adjunct professor at Cal State Bakersfield, teaching political science. She also served as campaign manager for a local bond measure to benefit the Kern Community College District.

In December 2020, Parra filed to run for Congress in the 21st district against incumbent Representative David Valadao, a Republican, in the 2022 election cycle. The 21st district was redrawn in 2021 by the state's independent redistricting commission and then renumbered as the 22nd district.

On December 30, 2021, Parra ended her congressional campaign and filed to run for district 16 in the state senate. She was eliminated during the primary, finishing in 3rd place with 12% of the vote.

California Assembly
Preceded by Dean Florez	Member of the California State Assembly from the 30th district 2002–2008	Succeeded by Danny Gilmore
