= John E. Mullally =

American politician

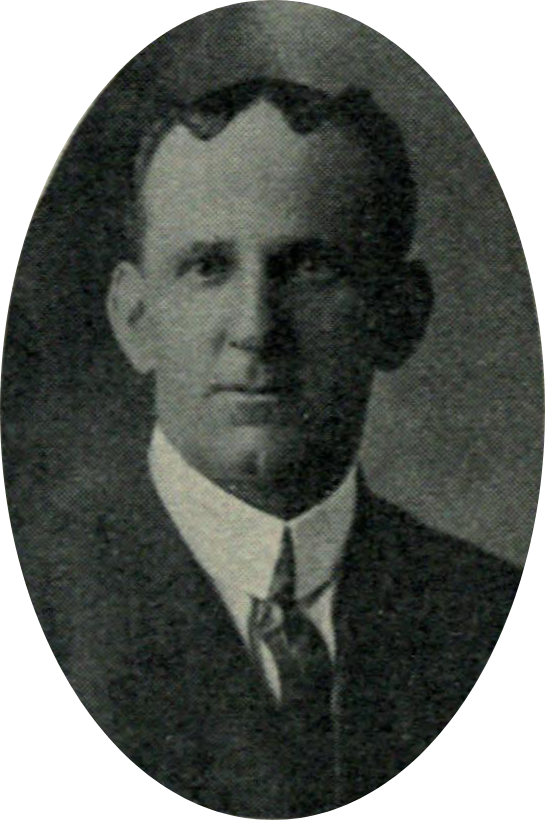
- Mullally c. 1911

Member of the California State Assembly from the 30th district
- In office January 2, 1911 – January 15, 1912
- Preceded by: George J. Black
- Succeeded by: Edward J. D. Nolan

Personal details
- Born: October 22, 1874 San Francisco, California, U.S.
- Died: January 15, 1912 (aged 37) San Francisco, California, U.S.
- Party: Republican

John E. Mullally (October 22, 1874 – January 15, 1912) was an assassinated American politician and saloon owner. He was elected to the California State Assembly from the 30th District in San Francisco, serving from 1911 until the time of his death in 1912.

== Biography ==
Mullally was born in San Francisco the first son and third child of John Mullally and Ellen Lannen Mullally. He attended public schools and St. Joseph College.

He was a Republican. He was listed by the Asiatic Exclusion League as being supportive of their cause.

His life was cut short on January 15, 1912, when three people disguised as soldiers from the Presidio, who had been conducting a string of robberies, chose the saloon he owned at 116 Eighth Street as their next target. Mullally attempted to resist and each of the three shot him. His bartender exchanged gunfire with the three, who fled with $87. Mullally's wife, May, and brother James, a fireman at a neighboring station, stayed with him until an ambulance took him to a nearby hospital, where he died while anesthesia was being administered.

He was buried at Holy Cross Cemetery in Colma, California.

== In Fiction ==
Mullally is a major character in a time travel/alternate history story, "Timely Misadventure", appearing in the book Altered Times surviving the attack and later elected president.
