= Danny Gilmore (politician) =

American politician

Member of the California State Assembly from the 30th district
- In office December 1, 2008 – November 30, 2010
- Preceded by: Nicole Parra
- Succeeded by: David Valadao

Personal details
- Born: December 2, 1949 (age 76) El Paso, Texas, U.S.
- Party: Republican
- Spouse: Cynthia Annette Gilmore
- Children: 2
- Education: Palomar College (AS)

Military service
- Branch/service: United States Marine Corps

Danny Desmond Gilmore (born December 2, 1949) is an American politician and law enforcement officer who served as a member of the California State Assembly for the 30th district from 2008 to 2010. In the November 2008 election, Gilmore won an upset victory over Shafter Mayor Fran Florez.

== Early life and education ==
Born in El Paso, Texas, Gilmore is a graduate of Palomar College as well as certificate courses of the Police Officers Standard Training program. Gilmore also taught weaponless defense courses at West Hills College Lemoore.

== Early career ==
=== Military career ===
Gilmore started his public service when he enlisted in the United States Marine Corps in 1969 and after assignments at Camp Pendleton, El Toro, and Okinawa, he received his honorable discharge and upon graduation from the CHP Academy in 1972 embarked upon a 31-year career with the California Highway Patrol.

=== CHP career ===
Gilmore was a CHP officer from 1972 until 2003. He worked for the South Los Angeles, Oceanside, Sacramento, King City, and Hanford CHP office during his career.

In 1981, Gilmore was promoted to sergeant and assigned to King City. His subsequent promotion to Lieutenant saw him assigned as the Hanford Area Commander. Promoted to Captain, Gilmore was assigned as Commander of the Visalia Area in 1995. His final promotion, before retiring in 2003, was as Assistant Chief to the Central Division Headquarters, Fresno.

Gilmore also led the Patrol's Physical Training Unit. Cited as one of the most demanding training programs in law enforcement, Gilmore drilled CHP Cadets daily for four years.

Active with his fellow law enforcement colleagues, Gilmore held membership with the California Peace Officers' Association, the Tulare County Chiefs Association and is a lifetime member of the California Highway Patrolman's Association.

=== California State Assembly ===
==== 2006 election ====
In one of the closest elections of the cycle, Gilmore lost the election to incumbent Nicole Parra by less than 900 votes.

==== 2008 election ====
As Assemblywoman Nicole Parra (Gilmore's predecessor and 2006 opponent) and State Senator Dean Florez (Parra's predecessor) have been feuding for years, Parra refused to endorse Shafter Mayor Fran Florez, Dean Florez's mother and Gilmore's Democratic opponent in the race. Instead, Parra, a Democrat, crossed party lines to endorse Gilmore, a Republican. Gilmore defeated Florez in the November 4, 2008 general election, and succeeded Parra in representing the 30th Assembly District.

==== 2010 election ====
Florez announced that she would seek a rematch against Gilmore. She faced a primary challenge from Pete Parra, the father of former Assemblywoman Nicole Parra. On January 19, 2010, Gilmore announced that he would not be a candidate for reelection. He endorsed David Valadao, a dairy farmer, to succeed him. Valadao defeated Florez in the general election.

== Personal life ==
Gilmore and his wife, Cindi, have two children and six grandchildren. Gilmore and his family have lived in Hanford, California since 1985 and have been active members of the Calvary Christian Center.
