= David Valadao =

American politician and farmer (born 1977)

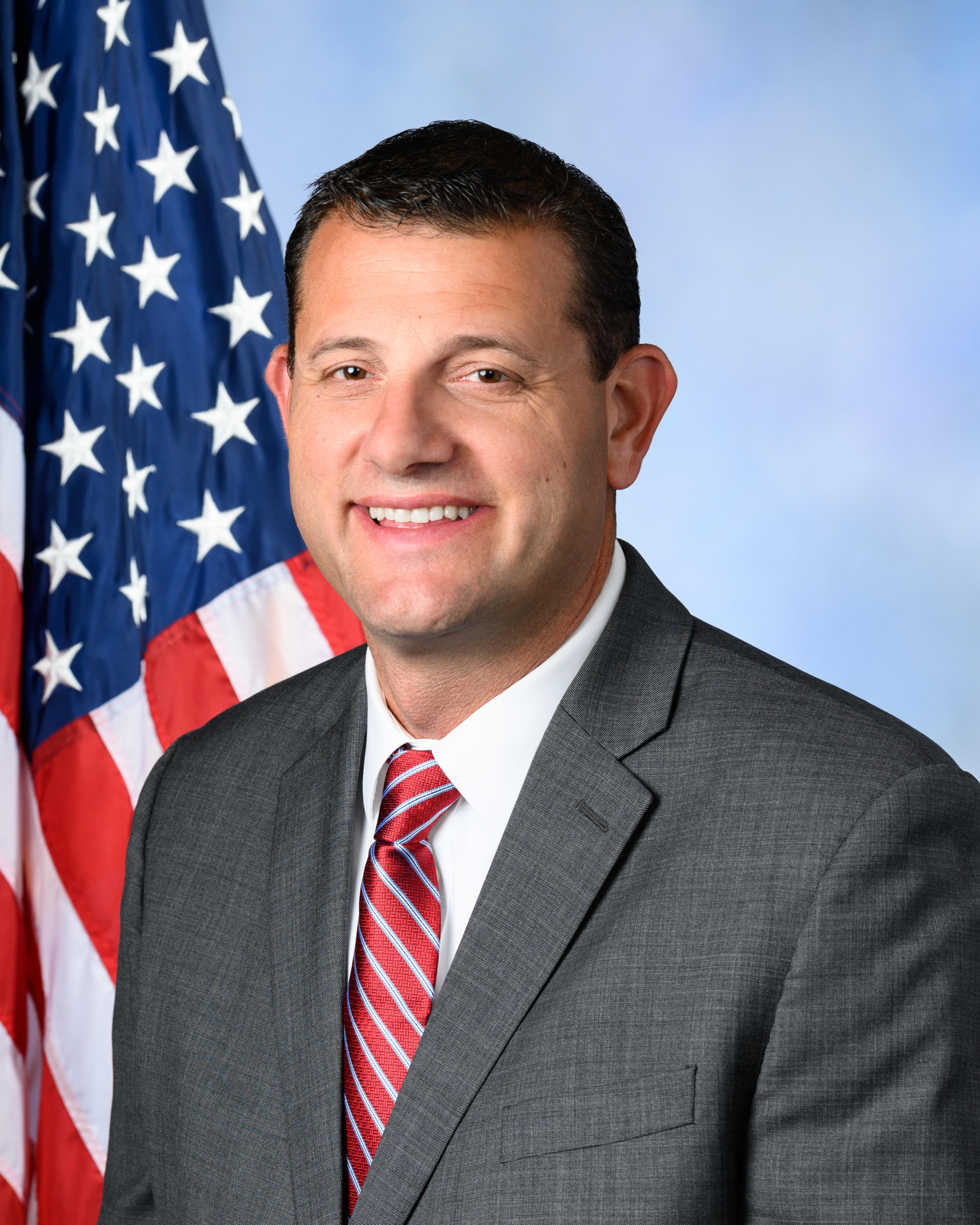
- Official portrait, 2020

Chair of the Republican Governance Group
- Incumbent
- Assumed office January 3, 2025
- Preceded by: David Joyce

Member of the U.S. House of Representatives from California
- Incumbent
- Assumed office January 3, 2021
- Preceded by: TJ Cox
- Constituency: 21st district (2021–2023); 22nd district (2023–present)
- In office January 3, 2013 – January 3, 2019
- Preceded by: Devin Nunes
- Succeeded by: TJ Cox
- Constituency: 21st district

Member of the California State Assembly from the 30th district
- In office December 6, 2010 – November 30, 2012
- Preceded by: Danny Gilmore
- Succeeded by: Luis Alejo

Personal details
- Born: David Goncalves Valadao; April 14, 1977 (age 49) Hanford, California, U.S.
- Party: Republican
- Spouse: Terra Valadao (m. 1999)
- Children: 3
- Education: College of the Sequoias (attended)
- Website: House website Campaign website
- Valadao's voice Valadao on issues with the Endangered Species Act. Recorded May 22, 2023

David Goncalves Valadao (/ˌvæləˈdeɪoʊ/ VAL-ə-DAY-oh; born April 14, 1977) is an American politician and former dairy farmer serving as the U.S. representative for California's 22nd congressional district since 2023, previously representing California's 21st congressional district (2013–2019, 2021–2023). His district comprises part of the San Joaquin Valley. He is a member of the Republican Party.

Prior to serving in Congress, Valadao served one term in the California State Assembly, representing the 30th district from 2010 to 2012. Valadao was first elected to the House of Representatives in 2012 to represent California's 21st congressional district. He was re-elected in 2014 and 2016, but narrowly lost re-election to TJ Cox in 2018. He was re-elected in a rematch against Cox in 2020.

A moderate Republican, Valadao was one of ten Republicans who voted to impeach Donald Trump during Trump's second impeachment and one of just two of that group to be renominated and reelected, along with Dan Newhouse. He was re-elected in 2022 and 2024, but lost reelection a second time in 2026, this time to Democrat Randy Villegas.

== Early life and education ==
Valadao was born and raised in Hanford, California. His parents are Portuguese immigrants; his father grew up on the Azores Islands. In a 2013 interview, Valadao said his parents were initially registered Democrats but later switched to the Republican Party.

Valadao graduated from Hanford High School in 1995. From 1996 to 1998 he attended the College of the Sequoias in Visalia as a part-time student but did not graduate.

== Agriculture career and bankruptcy ==
Valadao's father established a dairy farm in Kings County, California, in 1969. Valadao and his brother became partners in Valadao Dairy in 1992. He has been a member of the California Milk Advisory Board, Western States Dairy Trade Association, and Regional Leadership Council chairman for Land O' Lakes.

In March 2018, Valadao, a general partner of Triple V Dairy, was named in two lawsuits against the dairy for defaulting on almost $9 million in loans and failing to pay a supplier. In June 2018, a bank seized the dairy and sold it off to pay its debts. Valadao said, "Like so many family dairy farms across the country, burdensome government regulations made it impossible for the operation to remain open." After a lawsuit in 2019, Valadao agreed to pay $325,000 to former employees who claimed they had been denied breaks, minimum wage, and overtime pay. The settlement was not paid due to Valadao and Triple V Dairy filing for bankruptcy.

== California State Assembly ==
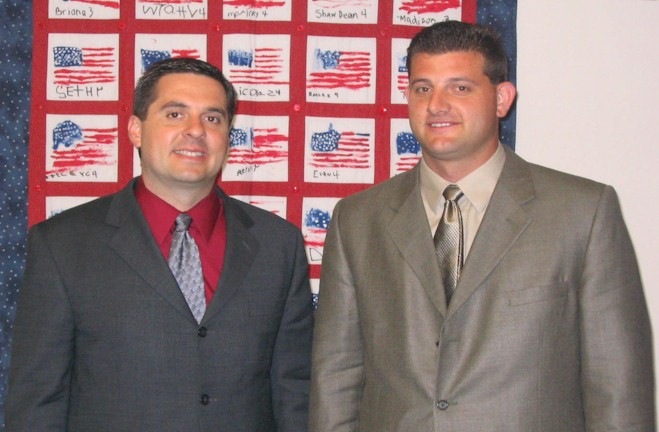
Valadao (right) with Devin Nunes in June 2004

Valadao announced his candidacy for California's 30th State Assembly district after the 2010 retirement of Republican assemblyman Danny Gilmore. He defeated Stephanie Campbell in the Republican primary, 78%–22%. In the general election, he defeated Shafter mayor Fran Florez, 61%–39%.

== U.S. House of Representatives ==
=== Elections ===
==== 2012 ====
In August 2011, Valadao announced that he would seek the Republican nomination for California's 21st congressional district. The district had previously been the 20th District, represented by four-term Democrat Jim Costa, but redistricting had shifted most of the district's share of Fresno to the new 16th District, and Costa sought reelection there.

In the June 5 open primary, he ranked first with 57% of the vote, ahead of Democrat John Hernandez – the head of the local Hispanic Chamber of Commerce – and Fresno City Councilman Blong Xiong. In the November 6 general election he defeated Hernandez, 58%–42%. A Wall Street Journal op-ed cited his victory in a district that had long been held by Democrats as a potential template for the GOP, while other analysts cited his opponent's "weakness as a candidate and a campaigner" as playing a major role.

==== 2014 ====
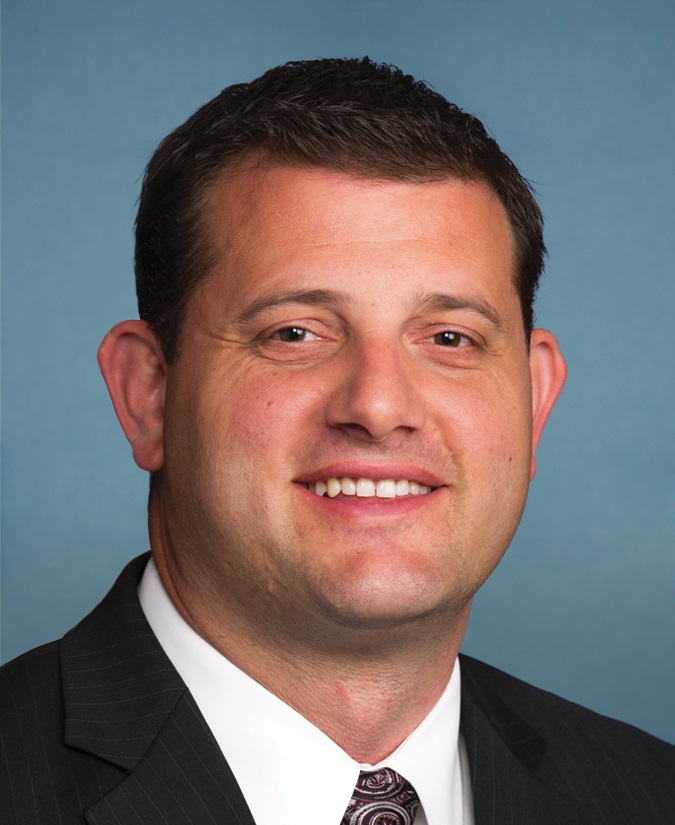
Valadao during the 113th Congress

Valadao ran for reelection in November 2014. His challengers were Democrat Amanda Renteria, a former political aide to Dianne Feinstein and Debbie Stabenow, and John Hernandez, the Democratic nominee Valadao defeated in 2012. In the June 3 primary Valadao finished first once again with 63% of the vote, and received majorities of 60% or higher in every county except for Kern. In the November 4 general election, he was reelected with 58% of the vote.

==== 2016 ====
Valadao ran for reelection to a third term in 2016. His first challenger was Democrat Daniel Parra, the mayor pro tem of Fowler, California. Another Democratic challenger was Connie Perez, an accountant in Pasadena, California, who grew up in Tulare, but due to issues regarding her residency outside of the district, as well as an alleged recent change in party affiliation, Perez dropped out less than a month after announcing her candidacy. In January 2016 Emilio Huerta, son of United Farm Workers co-founder Dolores Huerta, announced his candidacy in the race as a Democrat. In the June 7 primary Valadao finished first with 54% of the vote and Huerta finished second with 24.2%. In the general election Valadao was reelected with 56.7% of the vote to Huerta's 43.3%.

==== 2018 ====
In 2018, Valadao was initially set to face Huerta again in a rematch, with Huerta announcing his bid in May 2017. However, in March 2018, Huerta suspended his campaign for lack of funds. After Huerta's withdrawal, engineer TJ Cox of Fresno announced that he would challenge Valadao. Cox had previously announced a challenge to Republican congressman Jeff Denham in the 10th district before switching to Valadao's seat.

Valadao declared victory on November 6 after the Associated Press initially called the race in his favor, but a large number of mail-in ballots gave Cox a very narrow lead. Cox officially won the race on November 28, and Valadao conceded on December 6. The final count showed that Cox won by 862 votes. It was one of the last U.S. House races to be decided in the 2018 cycle.

==== 2020 ====
Valadao ran for and won his former seat in 2020, defeating Cox in a rematch by 1,754 votes, 51% to 49%. This occurred even though Joe Biden carried the district by ten points.

==== 2022 ====
In June 2022, Valadao placed second in the open primary for California's redistricted 22nd congressional district, advancing to the November general election. Despite Valadao's vote to impeach President Trump, Trump did not involve himself in Valadao's primary and House minority leader Kevin McCarthy endorsed Valadao. According to the Los Angeles Times, the GOP declined to support a challenger because Valadao holds a seat in a Democratic-leaning district that "can't be won by any other Republican". Far-right Republican Chris Mathys ran in the primary. A Democratic campaign ad criticized Valadao for his impeachment vote, as part of a larger strategy of helping Mathys to make for higher chances of a Democratic candidate winning the seat.

Valadao faced state assemblyman Rudy Salas, a Democrat, in the November general election. Valadao defeated Salas in the general election, 52% to 48%. Valadao's victory made him one of just two House Republicans who supported impeaching Donald Trump to remain in Congress after the 2022 election, alongside Dan Newhouse of Washington.

==== 2024 ====
In the March 5, 2024 open primary, Valadao received approximately 33% of the vote to secure a place in the general election in November 2024. Rudy Salas received the next highest percentage of votes, with approximately 31%, and again was Valadao's challenger. On November 12, 2024, the Associated Press declared Valadao the winner, with approximately 53.5% of the vote.

=== Committee assignments ===
For the 118th Congress:

- Committee on Appropriations
  - Subcommittee on Agriculture, Rural Development, Food and Drug Administration, and Related Agencies
  - Subcommittee on Military Construction, Veterans Affairs, and Related Agencies
  - Subcommittee on Transportation, Housing and Urban Development, and Related Agencies
- Committee on the Budget

=== Caucus memberships ===
- Congressional Caucus on Armenian Issues, co-chair
- American Sikh Congressional Caucus, co-chair
- Climate Solutions Caucus
- Republican Governance Group
- Republican Main Street Partnership
- Problem Solvers Caucus
- Congressional Western Caucus

== Political positions ==
=== Donald Trump ===
After Donald Trump became the presumptive Republican presidential nominee in May 2016, Valadao said he would support his candidacy. He rescinded his support in June 2016, declining to endorse Trump and saying he could not support a candidate who "denigrates people based on their ethnicity, religion, or disabilities."

In February 2017, Valadao voted against a resolution that would have directed the House to request ten years of Trump's tax returns, which would then have been reviewed by the House Ways and Means Committee in a closed session.

On January 13, 2021, Valadao was one of ten Republicans who voted for the second impeachment of Donald Trump for inciting the insurrection at the U.S. Capitol. Valadao later said that despite misgivings about the process that the Democrats used to send the impeachment article to the floor, he felt he had to "go with my gut and vote my conscience" and vote to impeach. He called Trump a "driving force" behind the riots and concluded that his rhetoric at the rally preceding the riots was "un-American, abhorrent, and absolutely an impeachable offense."

On May 19, 2021, Valadao was one of 35 Republicans who joined all Democrats in voting to approve legislation to establish the January 6 commission meant to investigate the storming of the U.S. Capitol.

=== Environment ===
In response to President Barack Obama's repeated assertion that the 2011 California drought was caused by global warming, Valadao said that "climate change has nothing to do with the drought" and that Obama administration regulations had worsened the drought.

=== Foreign policy ===
In 2017, Valadao was blacklisted by Azerbaijan for taking part in a visit to Armenia and a disputed, breakaway region of Nagorno-Karabakh, which is populated and governed by ethnic Armenians.

Valadao supported Trump's initial strikes in the 2026 Iran war. In June 2026, he voted against a war powers resolution that would have limited the war in Iran.

=== Health care ===
Valadao favored repealing the Affordable Care Act. On May 4, 2017, he voted to repeal it and to pass the American Health Care Act (AHCA). He was one of three co-sponsors of a last-minute amendment that added $8 billion to fund high-risk pools for patients with pre-existing conditions. The revised version of AHCA allowed states to get waivers to allow insurers to charge individuals with preexisting conditions more if the individual has had a gap in insurance coverage.

In 2017, Valadao introduced H.R. 299, the Blue Water Navy Vietnam Veterans Act, "to grant presumptive Agent Orange exposure status to U.S. service members who served in the territorial seas of Vietnam during the Vietnam War. This would enable eligible veterans to receive expedited consideration for Veterans Affairs (VA) benefits if they suffer from any of the diseases the U.S. Government has linked to Agent Orange." In August 2017, Valadao and Representative Joe Courtney sent a letter urging the Secretary of the U.S. Department of Veterans Affairs to ensure that Blue Water Navy Vietnam Veterans have access to medical care from the VA. That same year, Valadao and Representative Jeff Denham introduced the Assessing Critical Care Efforts to Strengthen Services Act. It would correct California's Medicaid reimbursement method to encourage physicians to operate in the Central Valley and ensure patient access to doctors and specialists. Also in 2017, Valadao and five other members of Congress introduced the Training the Next Generation of Primary Care Doctors Act of 2017, which would reauthorize the Teaching Health Center Graduate Medical Education Program. It would expand existing programs at health centers and establish new teaching health centers.

In 2025, Valadao withheld his support for a House resolution to cut at least $1.5 trillion from the federal budget, citing concerns about Medicaid reductions. He was one of eight House Republicans to publicly push Speaker Mike Johnson not to slash the benefit. Valadao ultimately voted for the budget resolution after winning reassurances from House leadership that cost savings "would focus on Medicaid fraud, while not touching benefits for those eligible for the program."

In a May 2025 article entitled "The key Republican warning about a megabill Medicaid fallout", Politico profiled Valadao's behind the scenes efforts "to rein in his party's ambitions to cut Medicaid spending." Valadao's congressional district has more Medicaid beneficiaries than any other Republican-held district. Valadao spearheaded a letter signed by a dozen vulnerable Republican members urging House leadership not to make major cuts to Medicaid. Valadao said "We're going through this partisan exercise to do what is supposed to be a tax bill, and it's becoming a health care bill, which is what we're trying to avoid, on an issue that desperately needs reform to make it better." In July 2025 Valadao voted in favor of the budget reconciliation bill, cutting funding to Medicaid, saying "It was not an easy decision for me, but I voted yes on the budget reconciliation bill."

=== LGBTQ+ rights ===
In 2016, Valadao voted for a measure that banned discrimination against LGBT employees by federal contractors. In 2015, Valadao did not join many other prominent California Republicans in signing a U.S. Supreme Court brief in favor of same-sex marriage.

On July 19, 2022, Valadao and 46 other Republican U.S. representatives voted for the Respect for Marriage Act, which codified the right to same-sex marriage in federal law.

=== Immigration ===
Valadao supports comprehensive immigration reform. In August 2014, he broke ranks with the Republican Party and voted against a bill that would have dismantled the Deferred Action for Childhood Arrivals (DACA) program. On February 23, 2017, Valadao called for a bipartisan solution to the U.S. immigration system. Later in 2017, he and nine other lawmakers wrote to Speaker of the House Paul Ryan asking for legislation to address DACA's future.

In June 2018, Valadao released a statement about the Department of Justice's "zero tolerance" policy, which involved separating children and parents at the Mexican border. "The substantial increase of minors at our southern border is both a humanitarian and national security crisis," he wrote. "While we must work towards a solution that reduces the occurrence of illegal border crossings, it is unacceptable to separate young children from their parents. This is exactly why passage of a compromise solution, such as that being discussed in Congress right now, is absolutely necessary."

In 2026, Valadao cosponsored the DIGNIDAD Act, which proposes a pathway to legal status for up to 12 million illegal immigrants, paired with stricter border enforcement and mandatory work and restitution requirements.

=== Tax reform ===
In December 2017, Valadao voted in favor of the Tax Cuts and Jobs Act.

=== Free trade ===
Valadao has criticized the Trump administration's imposition of tariffs against Chinese steel and aluminum imports, which prompted China to impose retaliatory tariffs on a range of U.S. agriculture products. In May 2018, he sent a letter to United States trade representative Robert Lighthizer expressing concern over the tariffs' impact on the Central Valley's economy, writing, "Not only do the proposed tariffs fail to adequately remedy China's unfair practices, such tariffs seriously jeopardize our farmers' access to export markets, which accounts for roughly twenty percent of their production."

=== Welfare and poverty ===
In 2013, Valadao was one of 15 House Republicans to vote against a Republican-backed bill to make deep cuts in food stamp spending. In 2025, Valadao voted in favor of the One Big Beautiful Bill Act, legislation which included spending cuts on Medicaid and food stamps.

== Electoral history ==
Electoral history of Jimmy Panetta
Year	Office		Party	Primary			General			Result	Swing	Ref.
Year	Office		Party	Total	%	P.	Total	%	P.	Result	Swing	Ref.
2012	U.S. House	21st	Republican	27,251	57.0	1st	67,164	57.8	1st	Won	Win	
2014	U.S. House	21st	Republican	28,773	63.0	1st	45,907	57.8	1st	Won	Hold	
2016	U.S. House	21st	Republican	37,367	54.0	1st	75,126	56.7	1st	Won	Hold	
2018	U.S. House	21st	Republican	34,290	62.8	1st	56,377	49.6	2nd	Lost	Gain	
2020	U.S. House	21st	Republican	39,488	49.7	1st	85,373	50.4	1st	Won	Gain	
2022	U.S. House	22nd	Republican	14,331	25.6	2nd	52,472	51.6	1st	Won	Gain	
2024	U.S. House	22nd	Republican	20,479	32.7	1st	89,484	53.4	1st	Won	Hold	
2026	U.S. House	22nd	Republican	32,491	40.7	1st	TBD					
Source: Secretary of State of California | Statewide Election Results

== Honors and awards ==
In August 2014, the United States Chamber of Commerce awarded Valadao its Spirit of Enterprise Award. He won the same award again in 2016.

== Personal life ==
Valadao lives in Hanford with his wife, Terra, and their three children. He is fluent in Portuguese and Spanish. Valadao is a Roman Catholic.

During his first tenure in the House, Valadao consistently ranked as the poorest member of Congress by net worth, with over $17.5 million in debt in 2018, mainly loans to his family's dairy farm.

U.S. House of Representatives
Preceded by Devin Nunes	Member of the U.S. House of Representatives from California's 21st congressional district 2013–2019	Succeeded by TJ Cox
Preceded by TJ Cox	Member of the U.S. House of Representatives from California's 21st congressional district 2021–2023	Succeeded by Jim Costa
Preceded by Connie Conway	Member of the U.S. House of Representatives from California's 22nd congressional district 2023–present	Incumbent
Party political offices
Preceded by David Joyce	Chair of the Republican Governance Group; 2025–present	Incumbent
U.S. order of precedence (ceremonial)
Preceded by Brad Schneider	United States representatives by seniority 154th	Succeeded by Jodey Arrington
