= Robert A. Rivas =

American politician (born 1980)

Robert Rivas
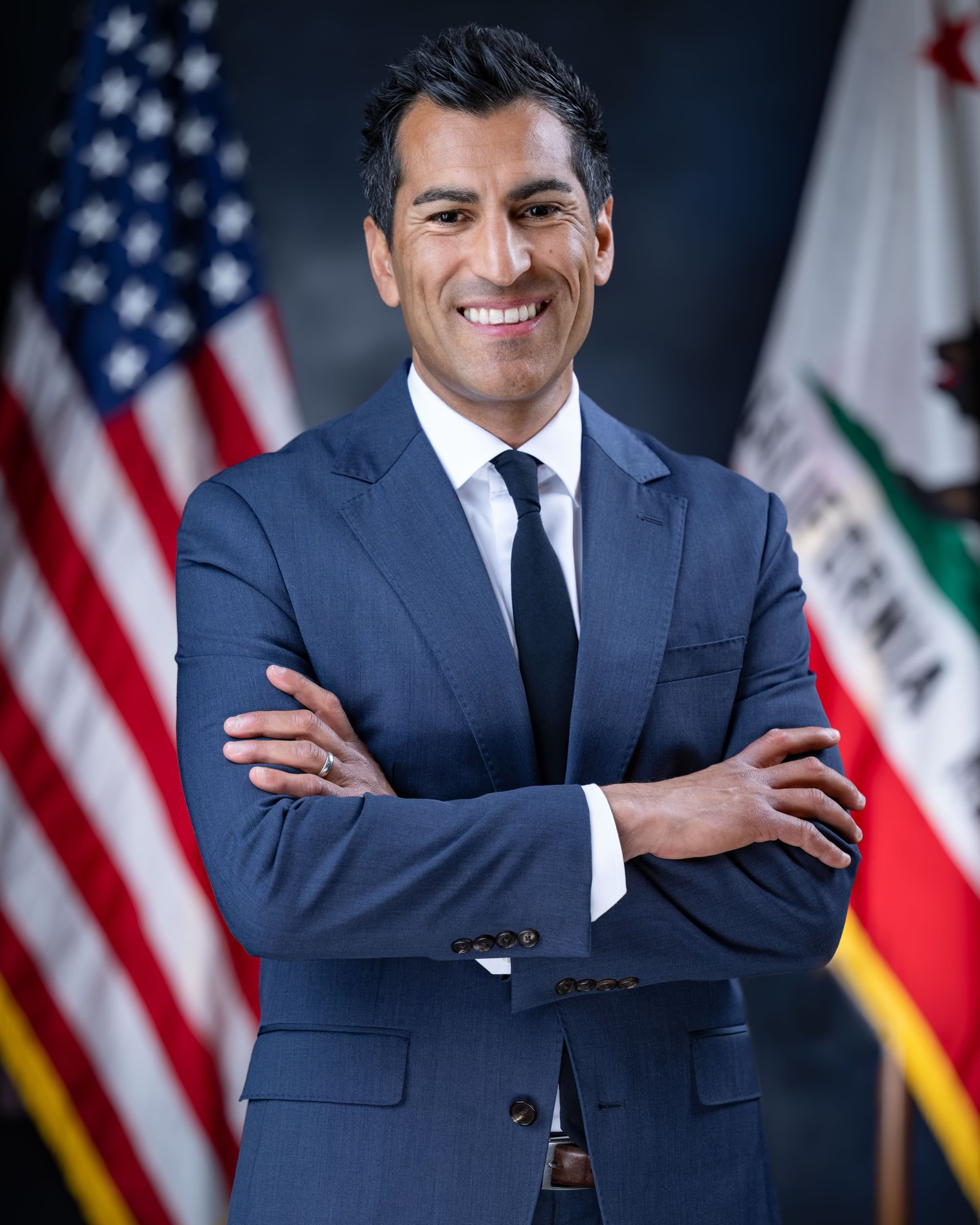
- Official portrait, 2023

71st Speaker of the California State Assembly
- Incumbent
- Assumed office June 30, 2023
- Preceded by: Anthony Rendon

Member of the California State Assembly
- Incumbent
- Assumed office December 3, 2018
- Preceded by: Anna Caballero
- Constituency: 30th district (2018–2022); 29th district (2022–present)

Personal details
- Born: January 2, 1980 (age 46) Henderson, Nevada, U.S.
- Party: Democratic
- Education: California State University, Sacramento (BA); San Jose State University (MPA)

Robert A. Rivas (born January 2, 1980) is an American politician currently serving as the 71st speaker of the California State Assembly. A Democrat, he represents the 29th Assembly District, which encompasses the Pajaro and Salinas valleys of the Central Coast. Prior to being elected to the State Assembly, he served on the San Benito County Board of Supervisors. Rivas was first elected to the State Assembly in November 2018, defeating Republican Neil G. Kitchens.

In November 2022, the Assembly voted to make Rivas the Assembly Speaker beginning in June 2023.

Rivas is a member of the California Legislative Progressive Caucus. His brother, Ricardo Rivas, is on the California Coastal Commission. Ricardo Rivas was nominated to the commission in 2021 by President pro Tempore of the State Senate, Toni Atkins. Rivas is a leader of the YIMBY movement in California.

== Electoral history ==
2018 California State Assembly 30th district election
Primary election
Party	Candidate	Votes	%
Democratic	Robert Rivas	30,379	45.5
Republican	Neil G. Kitchens	20,099	30.1
Democratic	Peter Loera-Muñoz	7,099	10.6
Democratic	Catrina Gomez	5,003	7.5
Democratic	Bill Lipe	4,217	6.3
Total votes		66,797	100.0
General election
Democratic	Robert Rivas	83,162	68.2
Republican	Neil G. Kitchens	38,719	31.8
Total votes		121,881	100.0
Democratic hold			

2020 California State Assembly 30th district election
Primary election
Party	Candidate	Votes	%
Democratic	Robert A. Rivas (incumbent)	64,086	69.4
Republican	Gregory Swett	28,308	30.6
Total votes		92,394	100.0
General election
Democratic	Robert A. Rivas (incumbent)	123,617	69.6
Republican	Gregory Swett	53,928	30.4
Total votes		177,545	100.0
Democratic hold			

2022 California State Assembly 29th district election
Primary election
Party	Candidate	Votes	%
Democratic	Robert A. Rivas (incumbent)	38,163	64.3
Republican	Stephanie L. Castro	21,148	35.7
Total votes		59,311	100.0
General election
Democratic	Robert Rivas (incumbent)	63,439	63.8
Republican	Stephanie L. Castro	36,030	36.2
Total votes		99,469	100.0
Democratic hold			

2024 California State Assembly 29th district election
Primary election
Party	Candidate	Votes	%
Democratic	Robert Rivas (incumbent)	40,756	64.8
Republican	J.W. Paine	22,145	35.2
Total votes		62,901	100.0
General election
Democratic	Robert Rivas (incumbent)	99,600	66.0
Republican	J.W. Paine	51,291	34.0
Total votes		150,891	100.0
Democratic hold			

Political offices
Preceded by Anthony Rendon	Speaker of the California State Assembly; 2023–present	Incumbent
