= Robert Prenter =

American politician

Member of the California State Assembly from the 30th district
- In office December 2, 1996 – November 30, 1998
- Preceded by: Brian Setencich
- Succeeded by: Dean Florez

Personal details
- Born: January 23, 1965 (age 61) Harbor City, California
- Party: Republican
- Spouse: Natasha Fooman

Robert M. Prenter, Jr. was a California State Assemblyman from 1996 to 1998.

== Personal life ==
Prenter was born in Harbor City, California on January 23, 1965. He married Natasha Fooman in 2003.

== Political career ==
He was elected to the State Assembly after defeating former Assembly Speaker Brian Setencich in the Republican primary (who ran as a write-in candidate in the general election). Prenter was defeated for reelection in 1998 by Dean Florez. Prenter's initial campaign was largely funded by the conservative California Independent Business PAC, principally backed by his uncle, religious radio network owner Edward G. Atsinger III. Atsinger is one of the founders of Salem Communications. The campaign was managed by Southern California-based political operative Jane Carroll.

California Assembly
Preceded by Brian Setencich	California State Assemblyman, 30th District; December 2, 1996 – November 30, 1998	Succeeded by Dean Florez
