= Brian Setencich =

American politician (born 1962)

60th Speaker of the California State Assembly
- In office September 14, 1995 – January 4, 1996
- Preceded by: Doris Allen
- Succeeded by: Curt Pringle

Member of the California State Assembly from the 30th district
- In office December 5, 1994 – November 30, 1996
- Preceded by: Jim Costa
- Succeeded by: Robert Prenter

Member of the Fresno City Council from District 1
- In office 1991–1994

Personal details
- Born: Brian Setencich; March 29, 1962 (age 64) Fresno, California
- Party: Republican
- Spouse: Kimberly Setencich
- Education: California State University, Bakersfield

Brian Setencich (born March 29, 1962) served in the California Assembly for one term from 1994 to 1996 and as Speaker of that body from September 14, 1995, to January 4, 1996. Setencich, a Republican, was the first freshman legislator to serve as Speaker of the Assembly in more than a century. He was previously a city councilman in Fresno and played professional basketball in Europe.

== Early years ==
Setencich was born in Fresno, California where he attended local public schools and played basketball for his high school team. After playing collegiately at Cal State-Bakersfield, Setencich went on to play professional basketball in Europe prior to starting his political career. For much of his adult life he has made a home in California residing primarily in Sacramento and San Francisco.

== Education ==
Setencich is an alumnus of Fresno High School in Fresno, California and California State University Bakersfield in Bakersfield, California. He played collegiate basketball for the University of San Diego, where he earned the WCC Scholar-Athlete Award for 1982–83, and went on to play for Cal State Bakersfield's Roadrunners men's basketball team, where he placed on that university's All-Time Roster for 1984 and 1985.

== Political career ==
=== Fresno City Council ===
Setencich began his political career as a Fresno City Councilmember from 1991 to 1994 representing District 1 (west-central Fresno). Though a political unknown at the time, he managed to raise over $200,000 to upset incumbent and win the election. He was the first Fresno City Councilmember to successfully run for higher office.

=== 1994 California Assembly ===
Setencich was elected to the California State Assembly in 1994 as a Republican representing the 30th Assembly District, encompassing the extreme southern San Francisco Bay Area, inland Monterey Bay Area, and parts of the northern Central Coast. The district is defined by major agricultural areas such as the Pajaro Valley and the Salinas Valley. He served as a member of the California Assembly's Higher Education Committee, as well as the Water, Parks & Wildlife and Banking and Finance Committees.

California's 30th State Assembly district election, 1994
Party	Candidate	Votes	%
Republican	Brian Setencich	35,940	52.21
Democratic	Bryn Batrich	32,901	47.79
Invalid or blank votes		6,180	8.24
Total votes		75,021	100.00
Republican gain from Democratic			

=== Speaker of the California Assembly ===
In 1995, he was the [Majority] Speaker Pro Tem for the California State Assembly. Setencich was the first freshman legislator to serve as Speaker of the Assembly since Thomas J. White and held the office from 1995 to 1996. He was elected Speaker after Doris Allen was recalled.

=== 1996 Re-election Campaign Run ===
Setencich ran for re-election as an incumbent, but lost. In the primary election of 1996, Setencich was defeated for renomination by Republican Robert Prenter who defeated Setencich again in November when Setencich ran as a write-in candidate.

== Post political career ==
After his political career in the state capital, Setencich relocated to San Francisco. He was Special Assistant to the Mayor for Emergency Communications (a.k.a. 911 Emergency Response Project and later to be known as the Department of Emergency Response), for the City and County of San Francisco between 1997 and 2004. This department began with the successful campaign for federal and state funding of this $170 million project. The D.E.M. was created in 2006 by legislation that combined the former Emergency Communications Department and the former Office of Emergency Services into one agency (Admin Code Sec. 2A.200). He retired in 2012.

Political offices
Preceded by Doris Allen	Speaker of the California State Assembly; September 14, 1995 – November 30, 1996	Succeeded by Curt Pringle
California Assembly
Preceded by Jim Costa	California State Assemblyman, 30th District; December 5, 1994 – November 30, 1996	Succeeded by Robert Prenter
