= Fran Florez =

American politician

Mayor of Shafter
- In office 2002–2006
- Preceded by: Garry Nelson
- Succeeded by: Cathy Prout

Personal details
- Party: Democratic
- Children: Dean Florez (son)
- Profession: Politician

Frances Audrey Florez is an American politician from California and a member of the Democratic Party.

== Biography ==
Florez began work at Bank of America in 1964, became the first female loan officer in the Shafter branch in 1973, and became the branch manager in 1990. She later worked as a consultant for the PG&E corporate contributions program. She is also a past president of the Chamber of Commerce of Shafter, California.

Florez won election to the Shafter City Council in 1996 and served there through 2008; she served as mayor (a council position) for four years, and was the first Hispanic mayor of Shafter. While serving as mayor, she decided to run for the 30th District seat in the state Assembly.

Beginning in 2002, she served as a member of the California High-Speed Rail Authority, serving as chairman in 2005.

In 2008, she was the Democratic nominee for the 30th District in the state Assembly. The outgoing incumbent, Democrat Nicole Parra, endorsed Fran Florez's Republican opponent, former Assistant California Highway Patrol Chief Danny Gilmore. Florez narrowly lost to Gilmore.

In June 2010, Florez won the Democratic primary in the 30th Assembly District by 13 percent of the vote against Nicole Parra's father, Pete Parra. She faced Republican farmer David Valadao in the November general election. Nicole Parra endorsed Valadao in a televised advertisement. Valadao won by a 61% to 39% margin.

In March 2013, she announced her candidacy for the 16th Senate District of the California state Senate, and soon after ended her campaign to help support candidate Leticia Perez and the prospects of the Democratic party by avoiding a contested primary.

== Personal life ==
She is the mother of Dean Florez, who represented the area (which includes Fresno, Tulare, Kern and Kings counties) in the California State Assembly from 1998 to 2002 and in the California State Senate from 2002 to 2010.
