= Connie Conway =

American politician (born 1950)

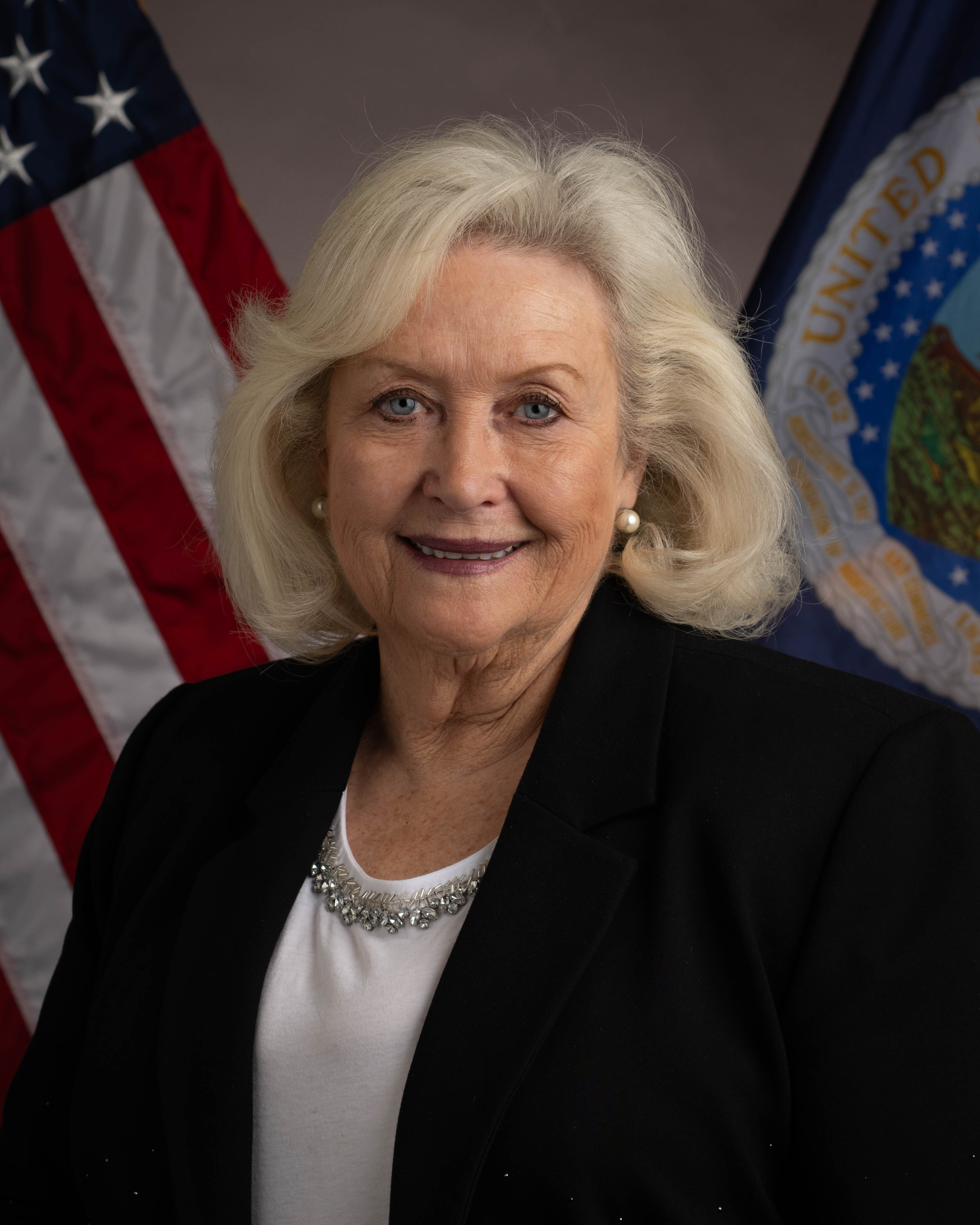
- Official portrait, 2025

Republican National Committeewoman from California
- Incumbent
- Assumed office September 7, 2025
- Preceded by: Harmeet Dhillon

Member of the U.S. House of Representatives from California's 22nd district
- In office June 7, 2022 – January 3, 2023 (Note: Conway's official service begins on the date of the special election, while she was not sworn in until June 14, 2022.)
- Preceded by: Devin Nunes
- Succeeded by: Kevin McCarthy (redistricted)

Minority Leader of the California Assembly
- In office December 6, 2010 – November 6, 2014
- Preceded by: Martin Garrick
- Succeeded by: Kristin Olsen

Member of the California State Assembly
- In office December 1, 2008 – November 30, 2014
- Preceded by: Bill Maze
- Succeeded by: Devon Mathis
- Constituency: 34th district (2008–2012); 26th district (2012–2014)

Member of the Tulare County Board of Supervisors from the 2nd district
- In office January 9, 2001 – November 18, 2008
- Preceded by: Mel Richmond
- Succeeded by: Pete Vander Poel

Personal details
- Born: Connie Marie Conway; September 25, 1950 (age 76) Bakersfield, California, U.S.
- Party: Republican
- Spouse: Craig Vejvoda (m. 2014)
- Children: 2
- Education: College of the Sequoias (attended); California State University, Fresno (attended)

Connie Marie Conway (born September 25, 1950) is an American politician serving as the State Executive Director of the USDA Farm Service Agency in California since 2025. A member of the Republican Party, she previously served in the same position from 2019 to 2021. She succeeded Harmeet Dhillon as California committeewoman to the Republican National Committee on September 7, 2025.

== Early life ==
Conway was born in Bakersfield, California. She attended the College of the Sequoias and California State University, Fresno. Her father, John Conway, served on the Tulare County Board of Supervisors from 1981 until his death in 1991.

== Pre-congressional career ==
From 1988 to 1991, Conway worked as a wellness coordinator at the Kaweah Delta Medical Center. From 1991 to 1994, she worked at Sweet's Home Medical. From 1994 to 2000, Conway worked as a district manager at CorVel Corporation.

=== Tulare County Board of Supervisors ===
Conway served on the Tulare County Board of Supervisors for eight years. She also chaired the board in 2005 and 2008. Conway also chaired the California Partnership for the San Joaquin Valley, an appointment she received from the governor. The partnership works to improve the economy and quality of life in the San Joaquin Valley by making policy recommendations to the governor. In 2006, Conway served as president of the California State Association of Counties, representing California's 58 counties at the state and federal levels. She later became a director of the National Association of Counties, chaired its membership committee, and worked on its economic development committee.

=== California State Assembly ===
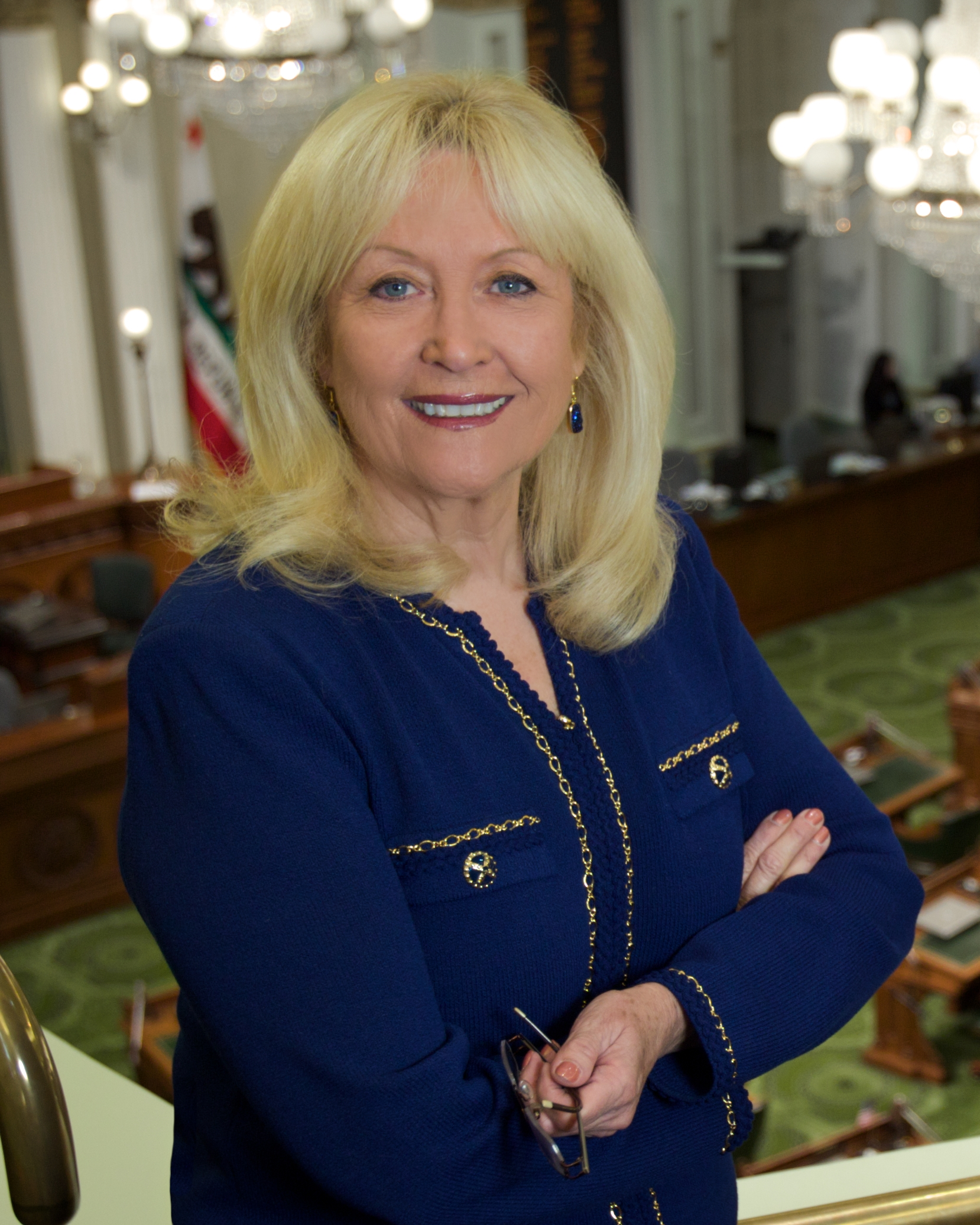
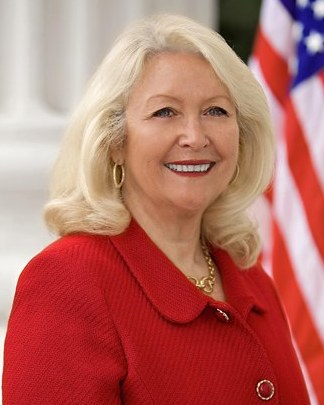
Conway in the California State Assembly

Conway entered the 2008 election to succeed termed-out Bill Maze in the California State Assembly. In the primary, she faced two candidates, Rebecca Maze (the incumbent's wife) and Bob Smith, a retired sheriff's deputy, and won.

After her reelection to the Assembly on November 2, 2010, Conway was elected by her Republican colleagues as the Assembly Republican Leader after a closed-door meeting of Assembly Republicans on November 4. She said that outgoing Minority Leader Martin Garrick had voluntarily stepped down, and she had been elected unanimously. Conway was the first woman to serve as GOP assembly leader since 1981.

Under the term limits law in effect in California at the time, Conway was limited to three terms in the Assembly; she stepped down at the end of her third term in 2014.

=== California State Executive Director of the Farm Services Agency ===
During the Trump Administration, she succeeded Oscar Gonzales as the California executive director of the Farm Service Agency from 2019 to 2021, after which Blong Xiong succeeded her.

== U.S. House of Representatives ==
=== Elections ===
==== 2022 special ====
Conway was a candidate in the 2022 special election in California's 22nd congressional district to replace Devin Nunes, who stepped down in January 2022. In the April nonpartisan blanket primary, she advanced to a runoff against Democrat Lourin Hubbard. On June 7, 2022, Conway defeated Hubbard in the runoff election.

=== Tenure ===
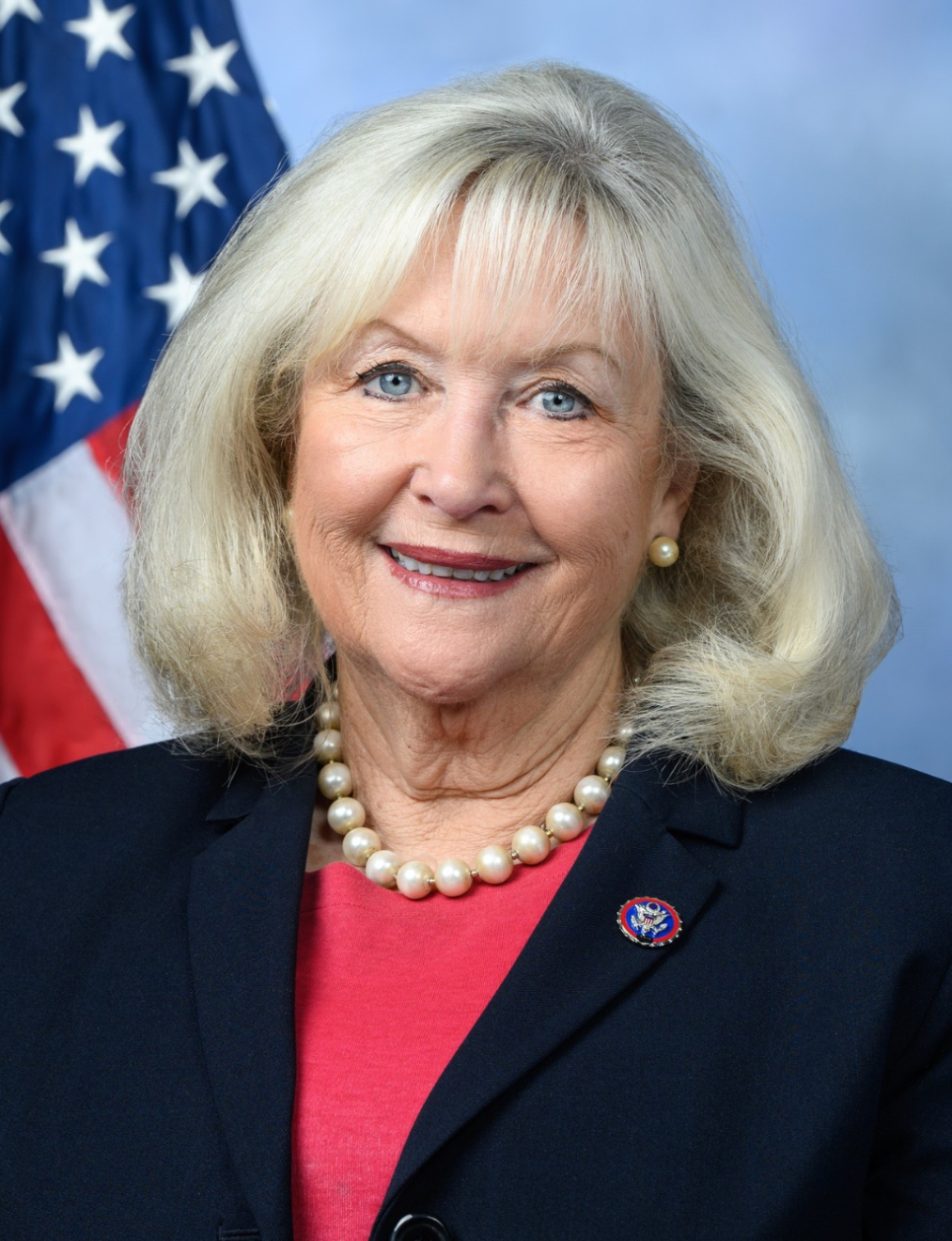
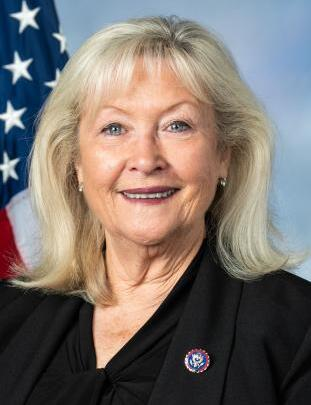
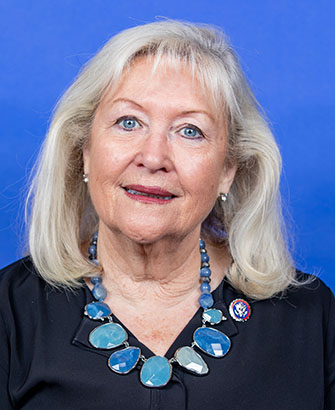
Conway Congressional portraits

Conway was sworn in on June 14, 2022. On July 19, Conway voted against the Respect for Marriage Act, which would protect the right to same-sex marriage at a federal level. On August 12, Conway voted against the Inflation Reduction Act.

Conway did not seek a full term in November 2022.

=== Committee assignments ===
- Committee on Natural Resources
  - Subcommittee on Energy and Mineral Resources
  - Subcommittee on Water, Oceans, and Wildlife
- Committee on Veterans' Affairs
  - Subcommittee on Disability Assistance and Memorial Affairs

== Post-congressional career ==
=== Return to the Farm Service Agency ===
Conway again became California executive director of the Farm Service Agency on May 23, 2025, succeeding Blong Xiong.

=== Republican National Committeewoman from California ===
Conway also became a Republican National Committeewoman from California, following the resignation of Harmeet Dhillon.

== Personal life ==
Conway is a Roman Catholic.

California Assembly
Preceded by Martin Garrick	Minority Leader of the California Assembly; 2010–2014	Succeeded by Kristin Olsen
U.S. House of Representatives
Preceded by Devin Nunes	Member of the U.S. House of Representatives from California's 22nd congressional district 2022–2023	Succeeded by David Valadao
U.S. order of precedence (ceremonial)
Preceded by Katie Hill as Former U.S. Representative	Order of precedence of the United States as Former U.S. Representative	Succeeded by Greg Lopez as Former U.S. Representative
