= Electoral history of Jim Costa =

Electoral record of American politician

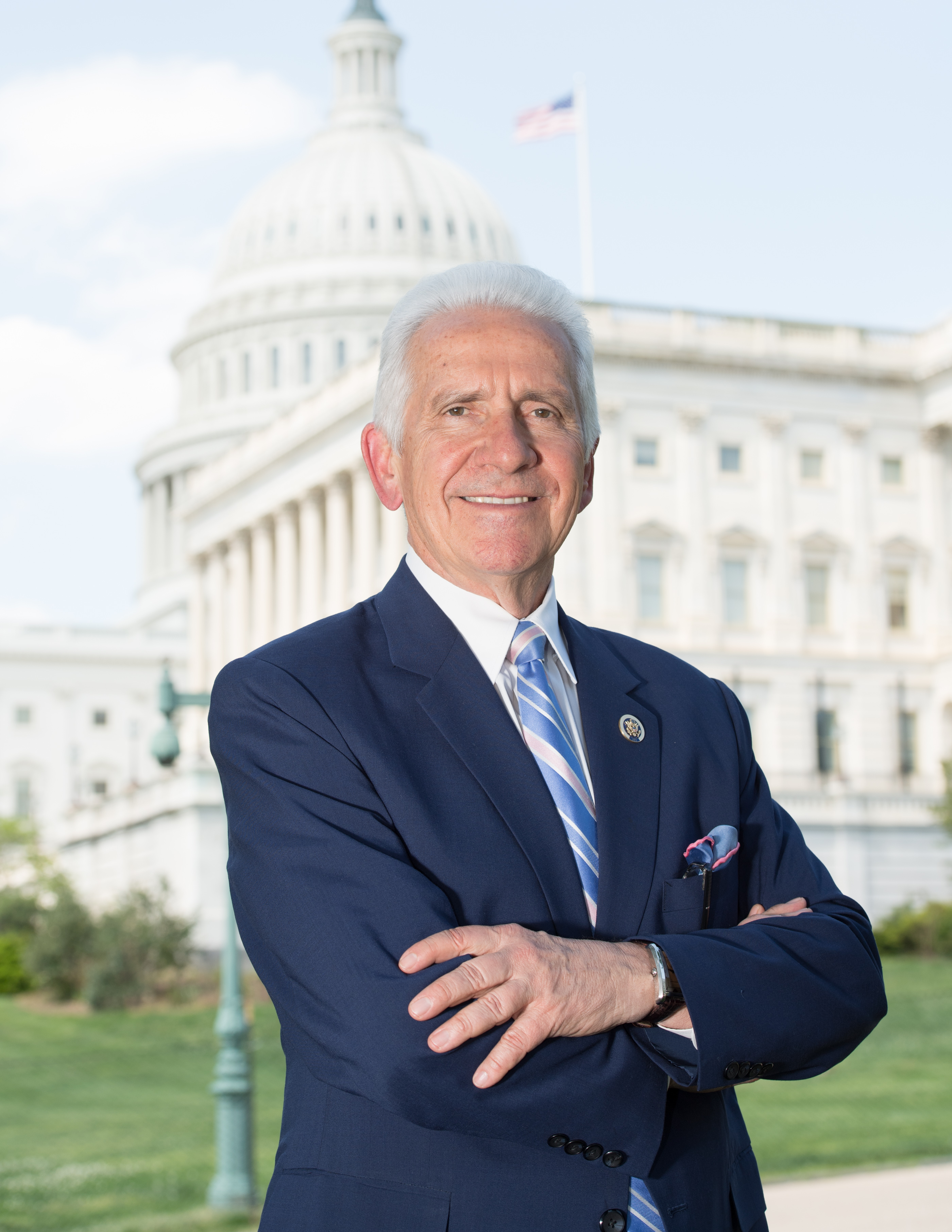
Official portrait, 2019

Jim Costa is an American politician from California currently serving in the United States House of Representatives from California's 21st congressional district. Costa has served the 21st district since 2023, with him previously serving the 16th district from 2013 to 2023 and the 20th district from 2005 to 2013. Costa previously served in the California State Assembly from 1978 to 1994 and in the California State Senate from 1994 to 2002.

== California State Assembly ==
1978 California State Assembly 30th district election
| Party | Candidate | Votes | % |
|---|---|---|---|
| Democratic | Jim Costa | 41,157 | 63.8 |
| Republican | Gerald G. Hurt | 23,348 | 36.2 |
| Total votes | | 64,505 | 100.0 |
| Democratic gain from Republican | | | |

1980 California State Assembly 30th district election
| Party | Candidate | Votes | % |
|---|---|---|---|
| Democratic | Jim Costa (incumbent) | 52,233 | 67.6 |
| Republican | Carol Harner | 24,989 | 32.4 |
| Total votes | | 77,222 | 100.0 |
| Democratic hold | | | |

1982 California State Assembly 30th district election
| Party | Candidate | Votes | % |
|---|---|---|---|
| Democratic | Jim Costa (incumbent) | 51,524 | 100.0 |
| Total votes | | 51,524 | 100.0 |
| Democratic hold | | | |

1984 California State Assembly 30th district election
| Party | Candidate | Votes | % |
|---|---|---|---|
| Democratic | Jim Costa (incumbent) | 57,397 | 69.9 |
| Republican | J. Gordon Kennedy | 24,695 | 30.1 |
| Total votes | | 82,092 | 100.0 |
| Democratic hold | | | |

1986 California State Assembly 30th district election
| Party | Candidate | Votes | % |
|---|---|---|---|
| Democratic | Jim Costa (incumbent) | 41,271 | 67.3 |
| Republican | Blaine T. Anderson | 20,058 | 32.7 |
| Total votes | | 61,329 | 100.0 |
| Democratic hold | | | |

1988 California State Assembly 30th district election
| Party | Candidate | Votes | % |
|---|---|---|---|
| Democratic | Jim Costa (incumbent) | 57,826 | 71.7 |
| Republican | Gerald G. Hurt | 22,861 | 28.3 |
| Total votes | | 80,687 | 100.0 |
| Democratic hold | | | |

1990 California State Assembly 30th district election
Primary election
| Party | Candidate | Votes | % |
|---|---|---|---|
| Democratic | Jim Costa (incumbent) | 22,239 | 100.0 |
| Total votes | | 22,239 | 100.0 |
General election
| Democratic | Jim Costa (incumbent) | 39,414 | 62.4 |
| Republican | Gerald G. Hurt | 23,793 | 37.6 |
| Total votes | | 63,207 | 100.0 |
| Democratic hold | | | |

1992 California State Assembly 30th district election
Primary election
| Party | Candidate | Votes | % |
|---|---|---|---|
| Democratic | Jim Costa (incumbent) | 13,551 | 61.82 |
| Democratic | Linda Morales | 8,370 | 38.18 |
| Total votes | | 21,921 | 100.0 |
General election
| Democratic | Jim Costa (incumbent) | 52,566 | 65.2 |
| Republican | Gerald G. Hurt | 28,048 | 34.8 |
| Total votes | | 80,614 | 100.0 |
| Democratic hold | | | |

== California State Senate ==
1993 California State Senate 16th district special election Vacancy resulting from the resignation of Don Rogers
Primary election
| Party | Candidate | Votes | % |
|---|---|---|---|
| Democratic | Jim Costa | 29,350 | 38.0 |
| Republican | Phil Wyman | 28,214 | 36.5 |
| Republican | Kevin McDermott | 11,442 | 14.8 |
| Democratic | Irma Carson | 3,217 | 4.2 |
| Republican | Leonard C. Tekaat | 1,160 | 1.5 |
| Republican | Michael McCloskey | 1,041 | 1.3 |
| Democratic | Daniel Beller | 978 | 1.3 |
| Democratic | Dennis J. Wilson | 763 | 1.0 |
| Republican | Donald G. Heath | 539 | 0.7 |
| Democratic | Jay Hanson | 364 | 0.5 |
| Republican | Chris S. Binning | 225 | 0.3 |
| Total votes | | 77,293 | 100.0 |
General election
| Republican | Phil Wyman | 48,768 | 52.7 |
| Democratic | Jim Costa | 43,807 | 47.3 |
| Independent | Leonard C. Tekaat (write-in) | 5 | 0.0 |
| Total votes | | 92,580 | 100.0 |
| Republican hold | | | |

1994 California State Senate 16th district election
Primary election
| Party | Candidate | Votes | % |
|---|---|---|---|
| Democratic | Jim Costa | 35,071 | 100.0 |
| Total votes | | 35,071 | 100.0 |
General election
| Democratic | Jim Costa | 70,321 | 51.6 |
| Republican | Phil Wyman (incumbent) | 66,053 | 48.4 |
| Total votes | | 136,374 | 100.0 |
| Democratic gain from Republican | | | |

1998 California State Senate 16th district election
| Party | Candidate | Votes | % |
|---|---|---|---|
| Democratic | Jim Costa (incumbent) | 92,163 | 71.9 |
| Republican | Gregg Palmer | 36,005 | 28.1 |
| Total votes | | 128,168 | 100.0 |
| Democratic hold | | | |

== U.S. House of Representatives ==
=== 20th district ===
2004 California's 20th congressional district election
Primary election
| Party | Candidate | Votes | % |
|---|---|---|---|
| Democratic | Jim Costa | 24,338 | 73.2 |
| Democratic | Lisa Quigley | 8,925 | 26.8 |
| Total votes | | 33,263 | 100.0 |
General election
| Democratic | Jim Costa | 61,005 | 53.5 |
| Republican | Roy Ashburn | 53,231 | 46.5 |
| Total votes | | 114,236 | 100.0 |
| Democratic hold | | | |

2006 California's 20th congressional district election
Primary election
| Party | Candidate | Votes | % |
|---|---|---|---|
| Democratic | Jim Costa (incumbent) | 24,356 | 100.0 |
| Total votes | | 24,356 | 100.0 |
General election
| Democratic | Jim Costa (incumbent) | 61,120 | 100.0 |
| Total votes | | 61,120 | 100.0 |
| Democratic hold | | | |

2008 California's 20th congressional district election
Primary election
| Party | Candidate | Votes | % |
|---|---|---|---|
| Democratic | Jim Costa (incumbent) | 22,042 | 100.0 |
| Total votes | | 22,042 | 100.0 |
General election
| Democratic | Jim Costa (incumbent) | 93,023 | 74.4 |
| Republican | Jim Lopez | 32,118 | 25.6 |
| Total votes | | 125,141 | 100.0 |
| Democratic hold | | | |

2010 California's 20th congressional district election
Primary election
| Party | Candidate | Votes | % |
|---|---|---|---|
| Democratic | Jim Costa (incumbent) | 19,599 | 79.3 |
| Democratic | Steve Haze | 5,122 | 20.7 |
| Total votes | | 24,721 | 100.0 |
General election
| Democratic | Jim Costa (incumbent) | 46,247 | 51.8 |
| Republican | Andy Vidak | 43,197 | 48.2 |
| Total votes | | 89,444 | 100.0 |
| Democratic hold | | | |

=== 16th district ===
2012 California's 16th congressional district election
Primary election
| Party | Candidate | Votes | % |
|---|---|---|---|
| Democratic | Jim Costa (incumbent) | 25,355 | 42.7 |
| Republican | Brian Daniel Whelan | 15,053 | 25.3 |
| Republican | Johnny M. Tacherra | 6,776 | 11.4 |
| Republican | Mark Garcia | 6,529 | 11.0 |
| Democratic | Loraine Goodwin | 5,703 | 9.6 |
| Total votes | | 59,416 | 100.0 |
General election
| Democratic | Jim Costa (incumbent) | 84,649 | 57.4 |
| Republican | Brian Daniel Whelan | 62,801 | 42.6 |
| Total votes | | 147,450 | 100.0 |
| Democratic hold | | | |

2014 California's 16th congressional district election
Primary election
| Party | Candidate | Votes | % |
|---|---|---|---|
| Democratic | Jim Costa (incumbent) | 25,586 | 44.3 |
| Republican | Johnny M. Tacherra | 12,542 | 21.7 |
| Republican | Steve Crass | 8,877 | 15.4 |
| Republican | Mel Levey | 4,565 | 7.9 |
| Republican | Joanna Garcia-Botelho | 3,827 | 6.6 |
| Democratic | Job Melton | 2,370 | 4.1 |
| Total votes | | 57,767 | 100.0 |
General election
| Democratic | Jim Costa (incumbent) | 46,277 | 50.7 |
| Republican | Johnny M. Tacherra | 44,943 | 49.3 |
| Total votes | | 91,220 | 100.0 |
| Democratic hold | | | |

2016 California's 16th congressional district election
Primary election
| Party | Candidate | Votes | % |
|---|---|---|---|
| Democratic | Jim Costa (incumbent) | 52,822 | 55.9 |
| Republican | Johnny M. Tacherra | 31,028 | 32.8 |
| Republican | David Rogers | 10,606 | 11.2 |
| Green | Richard Gomez (write-in) | 13 | 0.0 |
| Total votes | | 94,469 | 100.0 |
General election
| Democratic | Jim Costa (incumbent) | 97,473 | 58.0 |
| Republican | Johnny M. Tacherra | 70,483 | 42.0 |
| Total votes | | 167,956 | 100.0 |
| Democratic hold | | | |

2018 California's 16th congressional district election
Primary election
| Party | Candidate | Votes | % |
|---|---|---|---|
| Democratic | Jim Costa (incumbent) | 39,527 | 53.0 |
| Republican | Elizabeth Heng | 35,080 | 47.0 |
| Total votes | | 74,607 | 100.0 |
General election
| Democratic | Jim Costa (incumbent) | 82,266 | 57.5 |
| Republican | Elizabeth Heng | 60,693 | 42.5 |
| Total votes | | 142,959 | 100.0 |
| Democratic hold | | | |

2020 California's 16th congressional district election
Primary election
| Party | Candidate | Votes | % |
|---|---|---|---|
| Democratic | Jim Costa (incumbent) | 41,228 | 37.5 |
| Republican | Kevin Cookingham | 38,652 | 35.2 |
| Democratic | Esmeralda Soria | 23,484 | 21.4 |
| Democratic | Kimberly Elizabeth Williams | 6,458 | 5.9 |
| Total votes | | 109,822 | 100.0 |
General election
| Democratic | Jim Costa (incumbent) | 128,690 | 59.4 |
| Republican | Kevin Cookingham | 88,039 | 40.6 |
| Total votes | | 216,729 | 100.0 |
| Democratic hold | | | |

=== 21st district ===
2022 California's 21st congressional district election
Primary election
| Party | Candidate | Votes | % |
|---|---|---|---|
| Democratic | Jim Costa (incumbent) | 33,850 | 47.0 |
| Republican | Michael Maher | 19,040 | 26.4 |
| Democratic | Matt Stoll | 11,931 | 16.6 |
| Democratic | Eric Garcia | 7,239 | 10.0 |
| Total votes | | 72,060 | 100.0 |
General election
| Democratic | Jim Costa (incumbent) | 68,074 | 54.2 |
| Republican | Michael Maher | 57,573 | 45.8 |
| Total votes | | 125,647 | 100.0 |
| Democratic gain from Republican | | | |

2024 California's 21st congressional district election
Primary election
| Party | Candidate | Votes | % |
|---|---|---|---|
| Democratic | Jim Costa (incumbent) | 42,697 | 53.0 |
| Republican | Michael Maher | 37,935 | 47.0 |
| Total votes | | 80,632 | 100.0 |
General election
| Democratic | Jim Costa (incumbent) | 102,798 | 52.6 |
| Republican | Michael Maher | 92,733 | 47.4 |
| Total votes | | 195,531 | 100.0 |
| Democratic hold | | | |
