= 2022 California's 22nd congressional district special election =

- June 7, 2022

California's 22nd congressional district
- Turnout: 20.99% (primary); 27.92% (general)
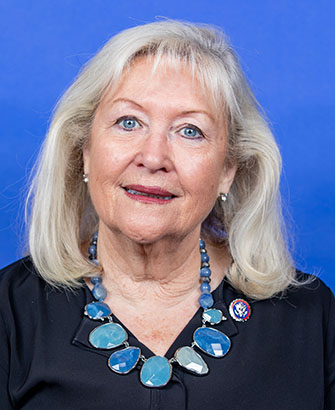

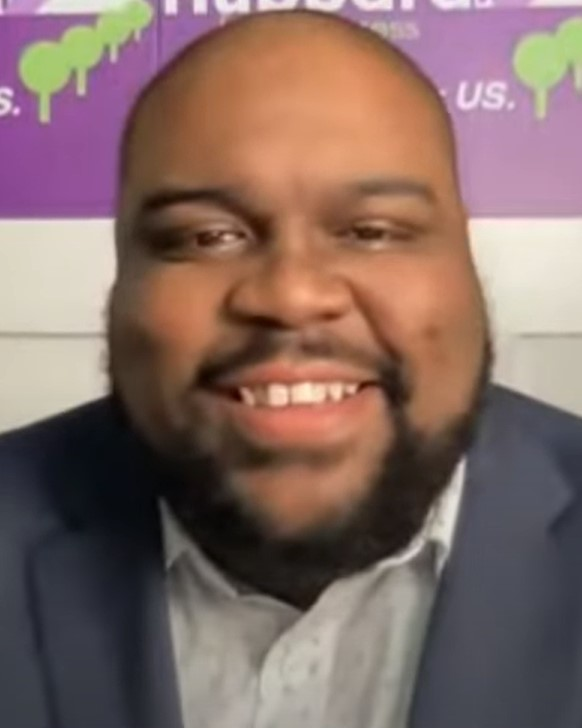

Candidate	Connie Conway	Lourin Hubbard	Matt Stoll
Party	Republican	Democratic	Republican
Primary	30,559; 35.1%	16,905; 19.4%	14,075; 16.2%
Runoff	71,720; 62.1%	43,701; 37.9%	Eliminated
Candidate	Eric Garcia	Michael Maher	Elizabeth Heng
Party	Democratic	Republican	Republican
Primary	12,556; 14.4%	7,619; 8.7%	5,391; 6.2%
Runoff	Eliminated	Eliminated	Eliminated
- Conway: 20–30% 40–50% 60–70%
U.S. Representative before election
Devin Nunes
Republican
Elected U.S. Representative
Connie Conway
Republican

The 2022 California's 22nd congressional district special election took place on June 7, 2022, with the primary election on April 5, 2022. California's 22nd congressional district became vacant when Republican representative Devin Nunes resigned on January 1, 2022, to become the CEO of the Trump Media & Technology Group.

Governor Gavin Newsom scheduled the special election for June 7, 2022, with the primary election on April 5, 2022. The election was held using a nonpartisan blanket primary, a system where all candidates run in the same primary, and if no candidate receives a majority of votes, the top two candidates then advance to the general election. No candidate received a majority in the primary, so Republican Connie Conway and Democrat Lourin Hubbard advanced to the runoff.

== Nonpartisan blanket primary ==
=== Candidates ===
==== Advanced to general election ====
- Connie Conway (Republican), former Minority Leader of the California State Assembly
- Lourin Hubbard (Democratic), operations manager at the California Department of Water Resources

==== Eliminated in primary ====
- Eric Garcia (Democratic), U.S. Marine Corps veteran, therapist and independent candidate for this district in 2020
- Elizabeth Heng (Republican), candidate for California's 16th congressional district in 2018, former U.S. House staffer and small business owner
- Michael Maher (Republican), aviation business owner
- Matt Stoll (Republican), small business owner

==== Disqualified ====
- John Estrada (Republican), businessman and perennial candidate
- Noah Junio (American Independent Party)

==== Withdrawn ====
- Phil Arballo (Democratic), financial advisor and candidate for this district in 2020
- Andreas Borgeas (Republican), state senator from the 8th district
- Nathan Magsig (Republican), Fresno County supervisor

==== Declined ====
- Mike Boudreaux (Republican), Tulare County sheriff (endorsed Magsig)
- Steve Brandau (Republican), Fresno County supervisor
- Luis Chavez (Democratic), Fresno city councilor
- Jerry Dyer (Republican), mayor of Fresno
- Shannon Grove (Republican), state senator from the 16th district and former Minority Leader of the California Senate (running for re-election)
- Melissa Hurtado (Democratic), state senator from the 14th district (running for re-election)
- Devon Mathis (Republican), state assemblyman from the 26th district (running for re-election)
- Margaret Mims (Republican), Fresno County sheriff
- Jim Patterson (Republican), state assemblyman from the 23rd district (running for re-election; endorsed Magsig)
- Lisa Smittcamp (Republican), Fresno County District Attorney
- Pete Vander Poel III (Republican), Tulare County supervisor
- Tim Ward (Republican), Tulare County District Attorney
- Bob Whalen (Republican), Clovis city councilor

=== Endorsements ===
Connie Conway (R)

Newspapers

- The Fresno Bee

Organizations

- California Republican Party
- Fresno County GOP (co-endorsed with Maher)
Michael Maher (R)

Organizations

- Fresno County GOP (co-endorsed with Conway)
Nathan Magsig (R) (withdrawn)

State legislators

- Jim Patterson, state assemblyman from the 23rd district
Declined to endorse

U.S. representatives

- Devin Nunes, U.S. representative from CA-22 (2013–2022); CA-21 (2003–2013)

=== Predictions ===
Source	Ranking	As of
The Cook Political Report	Likely R	December 7, 2021
Inside Elections	Likely R	March 4, 2022
Sabato's Crystal Ball	Likely R	February 23, 2022

=== Results ===
2022 California's 22nd congressional district primary
Party	Candidate	Votes	%
Republican	Connie Conway	30,559	35.1
Democratic	Lourin Hubbard	16,905	19.4
Republican	Matt Stoll	14,075	16.2
Democratic	Eric Garcia	12,556	14.4
Republican	Michael Maher	7,619	8.7
Republican	Elizabeth Heng	5,391	6.2
Total votes		87,105	100.0
Registered electors		415,021	

By county

County	Connie Conway Republican		Lourin Hubbard Democratic		Matt Stoll Republican		Eric Garcia Democratic		Michael Maher Republican		Elizabeth Heng Republican		Margin		Total votes
County	#	%	#	%	#	%	#	%	#	%	#	%	#	%	Total votes
Fresno (part)	16,240	28.6	12,585	22.2	9,306	16.4	7,902	13.9	5,997	10.6	4,674	8.2	3,655	6.4	56,704
Tulare (part)	14,319	47.1	4,320	14.2	4,769	15.7	4,654	15.3	1,622	5.3	717	2.4	9,550	31.4	30,401
Total	30,559	35.1	16,905	19.4	14,075	16.2	12,556	14.4	7,619	8.7	5,391	6.2	13,654	15.7	87,105

== General election ==
=== Predictions ===
Source	Ranking	As of
Inside Elections	Solid R	April 14, 2022

=== Post-primary endorsements ===
Connie Conway (R)

U.S. Executive Branch officials

- Donald Trump, 45th president of the United States (2017–2021)

=== Results ===
2022 California's 22nd congressional district runoff
Party	Candidate	Votes	%	±%
Republican	Connie Conway	71,720	62.14	+7.91
Democratic	Lourin Hubbard	43,701	37.86	–7.91
Total votes		115,421	100.00	
Republican hold				

By county

County	Connie Conway Republican		Lourin Hubbard Democratic		Margin		Total votes
County	#	%	#	%	#	%	Total votes
Fresno (part)	47,216	60.29	31,104	39.71	16,112	20.57	78,320
Tulare (part)	24,504	66.05	12,597	33.95	11,907	32.09	37,101
Totals	71,720	62.14	43,701	37.86	28,019	24.28	115,421

== See also ==
- 2022 United States House of Representatives elections
- 2022 United States elections
- 117th United States Congress
- List of special elections to the United States House of Representatives
