= J. Leonard Rose =

American attorney and politician

Member of the California State Assembly from the 34th district
- In office January 8, 1917 – January 3, 1921
- Preceded by: George Beck
- Succeeded by: E. H. Christian

Personal details
- Born: John Leonard Rose; March 25, 1882 Washington Township, Alameda County, California
- Died: March 31, 1969 (aged 87) Oakland, California
- Party: Republican, Democratic
- Education: University of California, Berkeley
- Profession: Attorney

John Leonard Rose (March 25, 1882 – March 31, 1969) was an American attorney and politician who served in the California State Assembly. He represented the 34th district, which at the time included portions of Alameda County.

== Life and career ==
John Leonard Rose was born on March 25, 1882 in Newark precinct of Washington Township, Alameda County, California (present-day Newark, California). His parents had immigrated to California from Portugal.

Rose attended the University of California at Berkeley and graduated law school at Boalt Hall in 1907. He had been admitted to the California Bar in April 1906.

During his early career, he had been a deputy district attorney for Alameda County and had been a law partner of Adolphus Frederic St. Sure. He served in the California State Assembly from 1917 to 1921. After returning from the state legislature, Rose was appointed attorney for the California State Board of Pharmacy. He returned to private law practice as an inheritance tax appraiser for Alameda County, from 1927 until his retirement in 1947.

== California State Assembly ==
Rose served in the 42nd session (1917) of the California State Legislature. He was re-elected and served in the 43rd session (1919).

He entered and left office as a Republican, but was a Democrat for some of his first term.

In the 1917 session, Rose authored Assembly Bills 271, 272, 295, 296, 372, 744, 745, 746, 747, 862, 863, 1100, 1101, 1102, and 1343.

== Personal life ==
His wife was named Mabel.

Rose died on March 31, 1969, in a hospital in Oakland, California.

== Electoral history ==
- November 7, 1916
- November 5, 1918

California's 34th State Assembly district election, 1916
Party	Candidate	Votes	%
Republican	J. Leonard Rose	?	80.3
Socialist	Charles Osterberg	?	12.3
Prohibition	Naomi B. Sitton	?	7.4
Total votes		?	100.0
Republican gain from Democratic			

California's 34th State Assembly district election, 1918
Party	Candidate	Votes	%
Republican	J. Leonard Rose (incumbent)	?	86.1
Socialist	A. H. Steward	?	13.9
Total votes		?	100.0
Republican hold			
