= E. H. Christian =

American politician (1890–1951)

Member of the California Senate from the 13th district
- In office January 5, 1925 - January 2, 1933
- Preceded by: Frank Carr
- Succeeded by: Charles F. Reindollar

Member of the California State Assembly from the 34th district
- In office January 3, 1921 - January 5, 1925
- Preceded by: J. Leonard Rose
- Succeeded by: William P. Jost

Personal details
- Born: 1890
- Died: 1951 (aged 60–61)
- Party: Republican

Military service
- Branch/service: United States Army
- Battles/wars: World War I

Eloise H. Christian (1890 - 1951) served in the California State Assembly for the 34th district from 1921 to 1925 and California State Senate for the 13th district from 1925 to 1933. During World War I he also served in the United States Army.
