= Bill Maze =

American politician

Member of the California State Assembly from the 34th district
- In office December 2, 2002 - November 30, 2008
- Preceded by: Phil Wyman
- Succeeded by: Connie Conway

Personal details
- Born: Everet William Maze; April 9, 1946 (age 80) Woodlake, California, U.S.
- Party: Republican
- Spouse: Rebecca Maze
- Children: 5
- Education: California Polytechnic College

Military service
- Branch/service: United States Army

Everet William Maze (born April 9, 1946) is an American politician from California and a member of the Republican Party. Maze is the president of Citizens for Saving California Farming Industries, a non-profit dedicated to dividing California into two states.

== Background ==
A United States Army veteran, Maze graduated from California Polytechnic College in San Luis Obispo in 1968.

== Early career ==
Born in Woodlake, California, Maze is a former Chairman and member of the Economic Development Corporation and Business Incentive Zone Council. He has also served as Director of California State Association of Counties, and has headed the Visalia Chamber of Commerce, Pro Youth Visalia, Inc., and the Boys & Girls Club. Maze is a past member of the Central California Resource Advisory Council for the Federal Bureau of Land Management, California Farm Bureau and Woodlake Rotary Club. He was a member and chairman of the Tulare County Board of Supervisors, where he served for one decade before being elected to the legislature in 2002.

== Assembly races ==
In 1998, Maze lost the Republican primary for the California State Assembly against then Fresno mayor pro tem Mike Briggs. He lost the general election as well, although he collected about 8000 write-in votes.

In 2002, then 34th district incumbent Republican Phil Wyman decided to seek reelection in the neighboring 36th district instead, leaving Maze as the sole GOP candidate in the heavily Republican district. Maze won election to the 34th district, which covers Tulare County, Inyo County, Kern County, and San Bernardino County and won easy reelection in 2004 and 2006.

== Assembly career ==
As an Assemblyman, Maze served on the Assembly Budget Committee and the Health Committees, served as Vice Chair of the Agriculture Committee, the Committee on Water, Parks, and Wildlife, and the Business and Professions Committee. The Assembly Speaker also appointed Maze to numerous Select Committees, including the Select Committee on Foster Care, where he served as Vice Chair. Term limits prevented Maze from seeking reelection in 2008. His wife Rebecca tried to succeed him, but she lost in the Republican primary.

== Footnotes ==
California Assembly
Preceded by Phil Wyman	California State Assembly, 34th District; 2002–2008	Succeeded by Connie Conway
