= Larry Chimbole =

American politician (1919–2015)

1st Mayor of Palmdale, California

Member of the California State Assembly from the 34th district
- In office December 2, 1974 – November 30, 1978
- Preceded by: Bob Wood
- Succeeded by: Phil Wyman

Personal details
- Born: May 22, 1919 New Haven, Connecticut, US
- Died: November 10, 2015 (aged 96) Palmdale, California, US
- Party: Democratic
- Spouse: "Vicki" Lelia (nee Roberson) Chimbole (1936–2011)
- Children: 4
- Education: Glendale College
- Occupation: Politician
- Known for: First mayor of Palmdale, California

Larry Chimbole (May 22, 1919 – November 10, 2015) was a United States Army veteran of World War II, California politician, and a member of the Democratic party.

== Early life ==
On May 22, 1919, Chimbole was born in New Haven, Connecticut. In 1937, Chimbole graduated from Stamford High School.

== Career ==
Chimbole was an owner of a hardware store in Palmdale, California.

In 1961, Chimbole became the President of Palmdale Chamber of Commerce.

In 1962, after Palmdale was incorporated, Chimbole was elected as the first mayor of Palmdale, California.

On November 5, 1974, Chimbole won the election and became a Democratic member of California State Assembly for District 34. Chimbole scored 51.7% of the vote against Republican Kenneth F. Hall (then Chief Deputy Director, California Department of Finance) and American Independent candidate Jack E. Ashworth. In 1976, as an incumbent, Chimbole won the election and continued serving his district. Chimbole narrowly defeated Phil Wyman, vice president of the Antelope Valley Board of Trade. In 1978, however, Wyman came back to beat Chimbole.

From 1996 to 2000 Chimbole was a member of the Antelope Valley Hospital District Board.

== Personal life ==
After WWII, Chimbole, lived in Glendale, California. In 1945, Chimbole adopted Harold Steven Chimbole (1943–2020). In 1957, Chimbole moved to Palmdale, California.

Chimbole's wife was "Vicki" Lelia (née Roberson) Chimbole (1936–2011), a real estate broker with Robertson Realty. They have four children.

On November 10, 2015, Chimbole died in Palmdale, California. He was 96 years old. Chimbole is interred at Desert Lawn Memorial Park in Palmdale, California.

== Legacy ==
- The Larry Chimbole Cultural Center is located in Palmdale, California.
- The First Mayor, a bronze statue of Chimbole on a bench in Poncitlàn Square was dedicated on October 8, 2015.

== Electoral history ==
Member, California State Assembly: 1974–1978
| Year | Office | Democrat | Votes | Pct | Republican | Votes | Pct |
|---|---|---|---|---|---|---|---|
| 1974 | California State Assembly; District 34 | Larry Chimbole | 35,416 | 51.7% | Kenneth F. Hall | 28,976 | 42.3% |
| 1976 | California State Assembly; District 34 | Larry Chimbole | 44,154 | 50.6% | Phil Wyman | 43,086 | 49.4% |
| 1978 | California State Assembly; District 34 | Larry Chimbole | 36,928 | 45.7% | Phil Wyman | 43,845 | 54.3% |

Political offices
| Preceded by District created | California State Assembly 34th District; 1974 – 1978 | Succeeded by Phil Wyman |
