= Jim Costa =

American politician (born 1952)

Jim Costa ComM
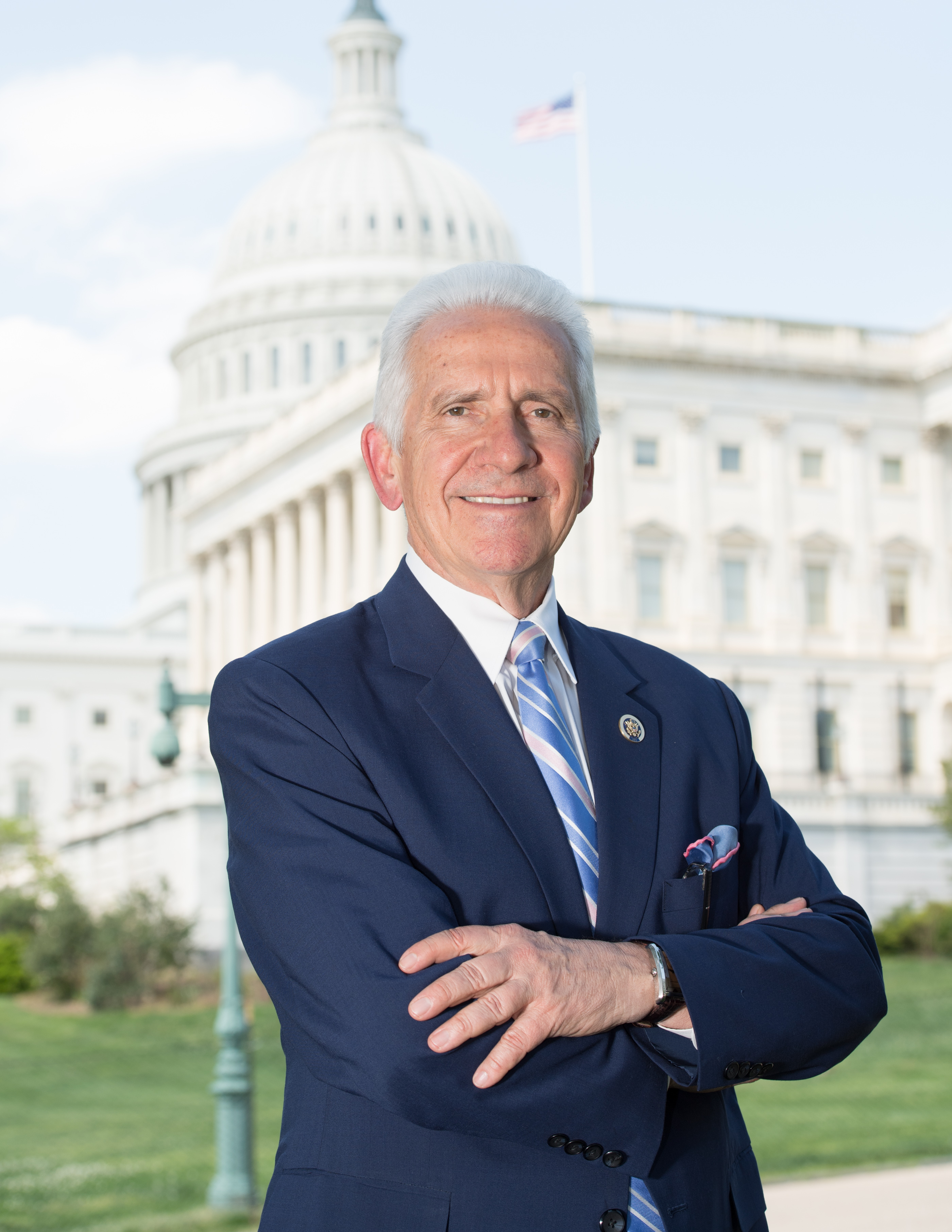
- Official portrait, 2018

Chair of the Blue Dog Coalition for Policy
- In office January 3, 2023 – May 24, 2023
- Preceded by: Tom O'Halleran
- Succeeded by: Mary Peltola

Chair of the Blue Dog Coalition for Administration
- In office January 3, 2017 – January 3, 2019
- Preceded by: Kurt Schrader
- Succeeded by: Stephanie Murphy

Chair of the Blue Dog Coalition for Communications
- In office January 3, 2015 – January 3, 2017
- Preceded by: Kurt Schrader
- Succeeded by: Henry Cuellar

Member of the U.S. House of Representatives from California
- Incumbent
- Assumed office January 3, 2005
- Preceded by: Cal Dooley
- Constituency: 20th district (2005–2013); 16th district (2013–2023); 21st district (2023–present)

Member of the California State Senate from the 16th district
- In office December 5, 1994 – November 30, 2002
- Preceded by: Phil Wyman
- Succeeded by: Dean Florez

Member of the California State Assembly from the 30th district
- In office December 4, 1978 – November 30, 1994
- Preceded by: Kenneth L. Maddy
- Succeeded by: Brian Setencich

Personal details
- Born: James Manuel Costa; April 13, 1952 (age 74) Fresno, California, U.S.
- Party: Democratic
- Education: California State University, Fresno (BA)
- Website: House website Campaign website
- Costa's voice Costa on the humanitarian crisis at the Mexico-United States border. Recorded July 11, 2019

James Manuel Costa ComM (born April 13, 1952) is an American politician serving as the U.S. representative for California's 21st congressional district since 2023. He previously represented the 20th congressional district from 2005 to 2013 and the 16th congressional district from 2013 to 2023. A member of the Democratic Party, his district includes most of Fresno.

Costa served in the California State Assembly from 1978 to 1994, and then in the California State Senate from 1994 until 2002. During his time in the Assembly, he served as Majority Caucus Chair. Costa chaired the Blue Dog Coalition in the U.S. House of Representatives during the 116th Congress and chaired the Subcommittee on Livestock and Foreign Agriculture during the 117th Congress.

== Early life and education ==
Costa was born on April 13, 1952, in Fresno, California. His parents were Manuel and Lena Cardoso Costa. All of his four grandparents immigrated from the Azores, a Portuguese archipelago in the North Atlantic, in the early 20th century. Three of them were unable to read or write and initially found work as laborers on dairy farms before eventually establishing their own. His parents grew up speaking Portuguese and did not learn English until they started school. He grew up working on the family farm.

Costa attended San Joaquin Memorial High School, a private Catholic school in Fresno, where he graduated in 1970. He then enrolled at California State University, Fresno (commonly known as Fresno State), earning a Bachelor of Arts degree in political science in 1974. While in college, he was a member of Sigma Alpha Epsilon and interned in the office of U.S. Representative B. F. Sisk.

Following his graduation, Costa worked as an aide to U.S. Representative John Krebs, assisting in policy matters related to California's Central Valley. He later became chief of staff to California State Assemblyman and future U.S. Representative Rick Lehman.

== California Legislature ==
In 1978, Costa was elected to a seat in the California State Assembly. At the time of his election to the Assembly, he was the youngest member of the state legislature at age 26.

He represented part of Fresno County in the legislature for 24 years, serving in the state Assembly for 16 years (1978–1994) and in the state Senate for eight years (1994–2002). He was a sponsor of the Costa-Hawkins Rental Housing Act, a bill signed into law in 1995 that prohibits rent control on single-family homes, condominiums, and any rental unit constructed after February 1, 1995.

From 2000 to 2001, Costa served as the president of the National Conference of State Legislatures.

=== 1986 Prostitution Arrest and Conviction ===
On August 29, 1986, "shortly after adjournment of the legislative session," Costa was arrested in Sacramento for soliciting prostitution. The arrest occurred "after police said he and a 19-year-old prostitute approached a woman posing as a prostitute" and "agree[d] to pay the undercover operative $50 to join them in a threesome." Costa pleaded no contest and was sentenced to three years of probation and fined $160. Less than two months later, he easily won reelection, beating his Republican opponent 2-1, in an election in which fellow Merced County Assemblyman Gary Condit won reelection by 3-1.

== U.S. House of Representatives ==
=== Elections ===
==== 2004 ====
In 2004, Costa entered the Democratic primary for the 20th Congressional District, which was opened up by the retirement of Cal Dooley, its seven-term incumbent. Dooley endorsed his chief of staff, Lisa Quigley, as his successor, but most of the state's Democratic Party establishment, including Senator Dianne Feinstein, endorsed Costa, who won the bruising primary and faced Republican state senator Roy Ashburn in November.

The 20th District at the time was a heavily Democratic, 63% Latino-majority district; it gave Al Gore his highest vote total outside the state's two large conurbations (Sacramento and the San Francisco Bay Area in the north and Los Angeles and San Diego in the south). Nonetheless, the Republicans spent a substantial amount of money on the race. Ashburn's campaign made plays on Costa's name ("Costa's going to cost ya") and linked him to former governor Gray Davis, calling them "two taxing twins". Costa won the election with 53% of the vote to Ashburn's 47%. Ashburn kept the margin within single digits by winning heavily Republican Kings County.

==== 2006 ====
In 2006, Costa was unopposed for re-election. The Democrats won control of the House in that election, and Costa became chair of the Natural Resources Committee's Energy and Mineral Resources Subcommittee. He is a member of the House Agriculture Committee.

==== 2008 ====
Costa was re-elected in 2008 with 74% of the vote, the highest percentage for a Democratic incumbent outside Sacramento, the Bay Area, and Southern California.

==== 2010 ====
In 2010, Costa was challenged for re-election by Republican Andy Vidak. In his closest race yet, the race was officially called for Costa nearly three weeks after election day, with the unofficial final tally standing at 45,806 votes (51.8%) for Costa and 42,773 (48.2%) for Vidak.

==== 2012 ====
For his first four terms, Costa represented a district including most of the majority-Latino portions of Fresno and Bakersfield. Redistricting after the 2010 census renumbered his 20th district as the 21st and made it slightly more Republican. In February 2012, Costa announced that he would run in the newly formed 16th district, a much more compact district that included most of Fresno as well as most of Merced. That district had previously been the 19th, represented by freshman Republican Jeff Denham. Denham's home had been drawn into the neighboring 10th district (formerly the 18th), and he sought re-election there. While most of Costa's old territory remained in the 21st, the new 16th absorbed most of the old 20th's share of Fresno County, including his home.

Costa faced Republican Brian Whelan in the general election. After the new districts were announced, it was reported that the NRCC considered Costa vulnerable, but had the district existed in 2008, Barack Obama would have carried it with 57% of the vote.

In November 2011, the League of Conservation Voters ran a series of television ads in Costa's district criticizing his environmental record. Costa was reelected with 54% of the vote.

==== 2014 ====
Costa faced an unexpectedly close race in 2014 against Republican Johnny Tacherra, a dairy farmer from rural Fresno County. On election night, Tacherra led by 736 votes, a margin that grew to 1,772 a few days later. Tacherra's lead narrowed as counting continued, and Costa ultimately defeated him by 1,319 votes. While Tacherra carried the district's portions of Merced and Madera counties, Costa defeated him in Fresno County by 9,600 votes.

==== 2016 ====
In 2016, Costa was the sole Democratic candidate in the "top two" primary, and received 50,917 votes (55.9%). In the general election he again faced Tacherra, who had received 30,342 votes (33.1%) in the primary. Costa was reelected with 58% of the vote to Tacherra's 42%.

==== 2018 ====
In the 2018 "top two" primary, Costa defeated the only Republican candidate, Elizabeth Heng, 53% to 47%. He was re-elected that fall in a Democratic "wave" in California, 57.5% to 42.5%.

==== 2020 ====
Costa and Republican challenger Kevin Cookingham, a former Clovis Unified School District educator, advanced through the "top two" primary in 2020, besting two Democratic challengers. Costa then won the general election with 59.4% of the vote to Cookingham's 40.6%.

==== 2022 ====
For 2022, Costa was redistricted to District 21. In the general election, he defeated the Republican nominee, former FBI agent Michael Maher, with 54.2% of the vote to Maher's 45.8%.

==== 2024 ====
Costa and Maher met in a rematch in 2024. Maher again lost, but made the race closer—he finished with 47.4% of the vote to Costa's 52.6%.

=== Tenure ===
Costa called in July for Joe Biden to withdraw from the 2024 United States presidential election.

On March 6, 2025, Costa was one of ten Democrats in Congress who joined all of their Republican colleagues in voting to censure Democratic congressman Al Green for interrupting President Donald Trump's State of the Union Address.

=== Committee assignments ===
For the 119th Congress:

- Committee on Agriculture
  - Subcommittee on Forestry and Horticulture
  - Subcommittee on Livestock, Dairy, and Poultry (Ranking Member)
- Committee on Foreign Affairs
  - Subcommittee on Europe

=== Caucus memberships ===
Member of the:

- Blue Dog Coalition (former chair)
- Congressional Equality Caucus
- New Democrat Coalition
- Problem Solvers Caucus
- Congressional Hispanic Caucus
- Congressional Taiwan Caucus
- Congressional Portuguese Caucus, (co-chair)
- Crime Survivors and Justice Caucus, (co-chair and co-founder)
- Congressional Ukraine Caucus

== Political positions ==
=== Abortion ===
Costa opposed the 2022 overturning of Roe v. Wade, saying, "this ruling strips women of their freedom to make their own decisions and the constitutional right to privacy." He is an original co-sponsor of the Women's Health Protection Act.

=== Agriculture ===
Costa co-sponsored the bipartisan Agricultural Certainty for Reporting Emissions (ACRE) Act. The act would strip provisions from Comprehensive Environmental Response, Compensation, and Liability Act (CERCLA), which was responsible for ensuring cleanup of industrial toxic waste dumps, oil spills, and chemical tank explosions environmental regulations on farmland. If enacted, the act would reduce transparency by protecting livestock farmers from changes to waste storage and disposal methods. Another provision would protect farmers from strict water laws, regulated under the Clean Water Act.

=== District of Columbia rights ===
Costa supports DC statehood. He was a co-sponsor and voted for Washington, D.C. Admission Act, which would grant statehood to the residential areas of the current District of Columbia as the State of Washington, Douglass Commonwealth.

On February 9, 2023, Costa, along with 30 other Democrats, voted with House Republicans to reject the Revised Criminal Code Act of 2022, passed by the Council of the District of Columbia.

=== Foreign affairs ===
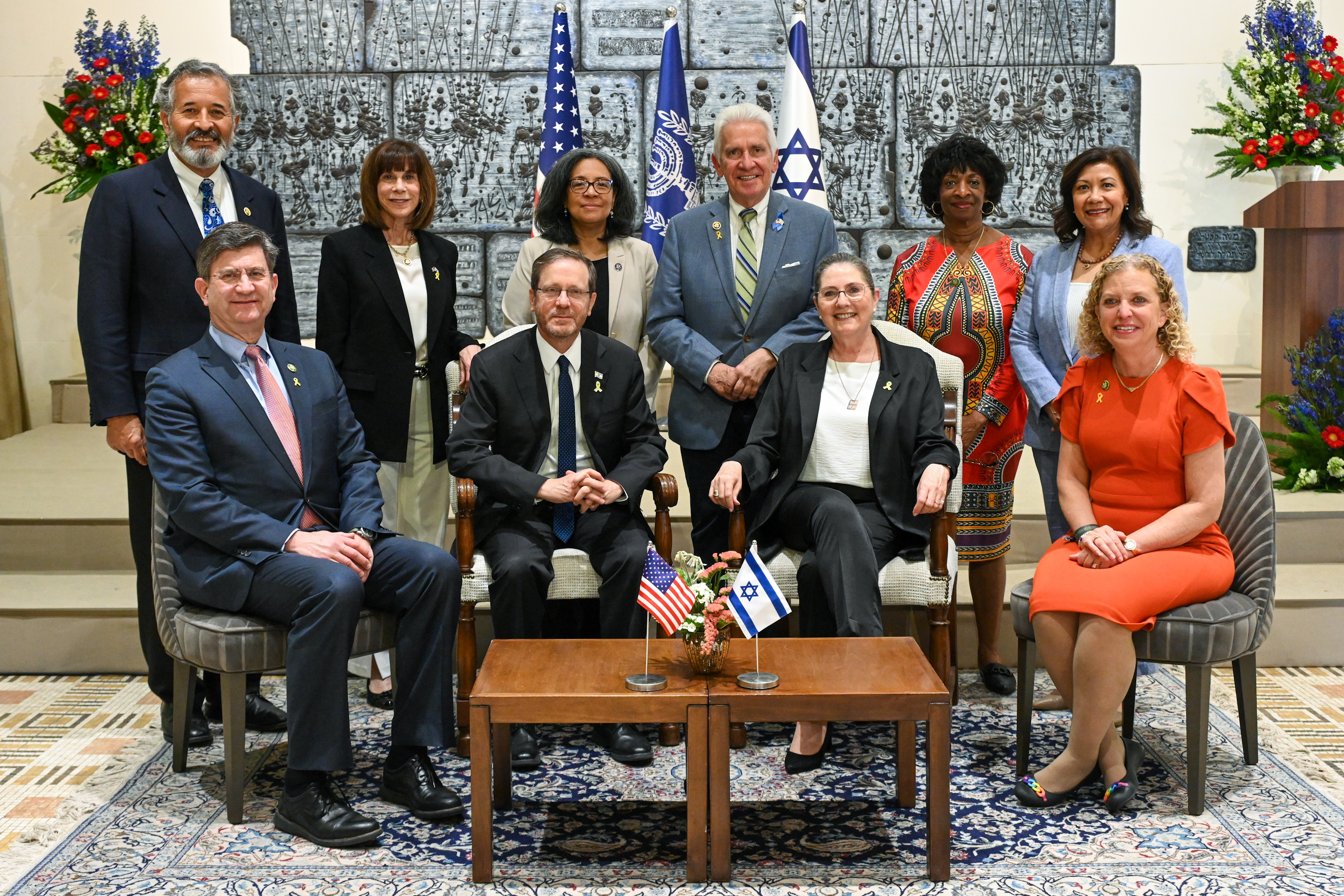
Costa and other members of the US congressional delegation with Israeli President Isaac Herzog in Jerusalem, Israel, March 28, 2024

Costa was one of five House Democrats to vote to continue selling arms to Saudi Arabia and to support the Saudi Arabian-led intervention in Yemen.

Costa voted to provide Israel with support following the October 7 attacks.

==== Armenia–Azerbaijan conflict ====
Costa accused Turkey, a NATO member, of inciting the conflict between Armenia and Azerbaijan over the disputed region of Nagorno-Karabakh, saying, "Azerbaijan has continued to fuel this fire by failing to recognize the sovereignty of the Republic of Artsakh, while Turkey has helped enable this aggression." On October 1, 2020, he co-signed a letter to Secretary of State Mike Pompeo that condemned Azerbaijan's offensive operations against the Armenian-populated Republic of Artsakh, denounced Turkey's role in the Nagorno-Karabakh conflict and called for an immediate ceasefire.

==== Ukraine-Russia War ====
In February 2023, during the Russo-Ukrainian War, Costa signed a letter advocating for President Biden to give F-16 fighter jets to Ukraine. Costa has been a regular attendee of the Yalta European Strategy annual meetings founded and sponsored by Ukrainian oligarch Victor Pinchuk.

=== Health care ===
Costa was reportedly a holdout vote on the Affordable Care Act (Obamacare) in March 2010. He ultimately voted for the legislation. To gain Costa's vote, the House leadership reportedly promised Costa and Dennis Cardoza funding for a medical school for California's Central Valley.

=== Immigration ===
He is an original co-sponsor of the American Dream and Promise Act, which provides a pathway to citizenship for Deferred Action for Childhood Arrivals (DACA) recipients. He was instrumental in crafting the bipartisan Farmworker Modernization Act, which would give undocumented farmworkers and their family members a path to legal immigration status.

=== Infrastructure and transportation ===
In 2008, Costa wrote a piece in Capitol Weekly calling for high-speed rail in California. He advocated creating a high-speed rail system that would go up and down California as well as across the nation at speeds of 225 miles per hour. He introduced different bills to support these rails. Costa's longtime colleague George Miller compared rail projects to President Dwight D. Eisenhower's highway expansion and pleaded to Transportation Secretary Ray LaHood and President Barack Obama for help with this project.

In 2015, Costa was one of 28 House Democrats to vote to build the Keystone XL pipeline.

In 2021, Costa joined a group of conservative Democrats, dubbed "The Unbreakable Nine", who threatened to derail the Biden administration's $3.5 trillion budget reconciliation package meant to tackle the nation's infrastructure.

=== Military ===
In December 2017, Costa introduced legislation to allow some Hmong- and Laotian-American veterans to be buried in U.S. national cemeteries. The legislation applies to Hmong and Laotian veterans who fought alongside the U.S. against North Vietnamese forces in the 1960s and 1970s. The bill, which does not allow for burials at Arlington National Cemetery, applies only to veterans who pass away on or after the bill's enactment. The bill was enacted in March 2018 as part of the Consolidated Appropriations Act of 2018.

== Personal life ==
Costa is Roman Catholic, and has been described as a liberal Catholic who favors abortion rights.

== Honors ==
- Commander of the Order of Merit, Portugal (June 8, 1996)

=== Foreign awards ===
- Ukraine
  - Honorary Diploma of the Verkhovna Rada of Ukraine (2024) – Awarded by Ukrainian Parliament; presented by Ruslan Stefanchuk, Chairman of the Verkhovna Rada.

== See also ==
- Electoral history of Jim Costa

Preceded by Paul Mannweiler	President of the National Conference of State Legislatures; 2000–2001	Succeeded by Steve M. Saland
U.S. House of Representatives
Preceded by Cal Dooley	Member of the U.S. House of Representatives from California's 20th congressional district 2005–2013	Succeeded by Sam Farr
Preceded by Zoe Lofgren	Member of the U.S. House of Representatives from California's 16th congressional district 2013–2023	Succeeded by Anna Eshoo
Preceded by David Valadao	Member of the U.S. House of Representatives from California's 21st congressional district 2023–present	Incumbent
Party political offices
Preceded by Kurt Schrader	Chair of the Blue Dog Coalition for Communications; 2015–2017; Served alongside: Kurt Schrader (Administration), Jim Cooper (Policy)	Succeeded by Henry Cuellar
Preceded by Kurt Schrader	Chair of the Blue Dog Coalition for Administration; 2017–2019; Served alongside: Henry Cuellar (Communications), Dan Lipinski (Policy)	Succeeded by Stephanie Murphy
Preceded by Ed Case	Chair of the Blue Dog Coalition for Policy; 2023; Served alongside: Jared Golden (Administration and Communications)	Succeeded by Mary Peltola
U.S. order of precedence (ceremonial)
Preceded by Emanuel Cleaver	United States representatives by seniority 45th	Succeeded by Henry Cuellar
Preceded by Gwen Moore	Order of precedence of the United States	Succeeded by Doris Matsui
