= Keith Olberg =

American politician (born 1960)

Member of the California State Assembly from the 34th district
- In office December 5, 1994 – November 30, 2000
- Preceded by: Kathleen Honeycutt
- Succeeded by: Phil Wyman

Personal details
- Born: R. Keith Olberg; October 29, 1960 (age 65) Chicago, Illinois, U.S
- Party: Republican
- Spouse: Lisa (m. 1982)
- Children: 2
- Education: PhD in constitutional law/political philosophy
- Alma mater: Claremont Graduate School (1993)

R. Keith Olberg (born October 29, 1960, in Chicago, Illinois) is an American politician from California. He is a member of the Republican Party.

In 1994, freshman Assemblywoman Kathleen Honeycutt (R-Hesperia) opted at the last minute not to seek reelection for health reasons. She did not inform any GOP officials of her decision, but did tell then unknown Olberg, a consultant with the Building Industry Association, and also endorsed him. Although he was eventually joined in the race by veteran Victorville City Councilman Michael Rothschild, the tip off helped Olberg win the GOP primary easily, scoring 65% of the vote.

He won reelections in 1996 and 1998 in the vast, sparsely populated and overwhelmingly GOP district.

== California Secretary of State Election ==
In 2002 Olberg ran for California Secretary of State. He won the GOP primary with 62% of the vote, then narrowly lost the general election to Assemblyman Kevin Shelley (D-San Francisco) by 4 points.

== Electoral history ==
Member, California State Assembly: 1995-2001
Year	Office	Democrat	Votes	Pct	Republican	Votes	Pct
1994	California State Assembly; District 34	Timothy G. Hauk	34,802	34.2%	Keith Olberg	67,073	65.8%
1996	California State Assembly; District 34	Lionel M. Dew	40,534	34.7%	Keith Olberg	76,248	65.3%
1998	California State Assembly; District 34	Steven Figueroa	30,444	32.3%	Keith Olberg	60,374	64.1%
2002	California Secretary of State	Kevin Shelley 34% March Fong Eu 29%	3,357,173	46.3%	Michael Schaefer 21% Keith Olberg 62%	3,070,879	42.3%

Political offices
Preceded by Kathleen Honeycutt	California State Assemblymember, 34th district 1994–2000	Succeeded by Phil Wyman
