= California's 34th State Assembly district =

American legislative district

Current assemblymember
Tom Lackey; R–Palmdale
- Population (2010) • Voting age • Citizen voting age: 466,780; 335,721; 277,228
- Demographics: 54.05% White; 5.26% Black; 32.87% Latino; 5.39% Asian; 1.58% Native American; 0.20% Hawaiian/Pacific Islander; 0.23% other; 0.41% remainder of multiracial
- Registered voters: 247,249
- Registration: 44.49% Republican; 27.70% Democratic; 22.58% No party preference

California's 34th State Assembly district is one of 80 California State Assembly districts. It is currently represented by Republican Tom Lackey of Palmdale.

== District profile ==
The district encompasses the majority of rural San Bernardino County outside of the urban core around the San Bernardino foothills and the Victor Valley. It stretches across to include much of the Antelope Valley, including small portions of Kern County, including Mojave and California City, and finally stretches down to take in about the western halves of Lancaster and Palmdale in Los Angeles County.

== Election results from statewide races ==
Year	Office	Results
2021	Recall	Yes 65.0 – 35.0%
2020	President	Trump 59.0 – 38.5%
2018	Governor	Cox 64.6 – 35.4%
2018	Senator	De Leon 61.2 – 39.8%
2016	President	Trump 60.2 – 34.1%
2016	Senator	Harris 53.2 – 46.8%
2014	Governor	Kashkari 65.5 – 34.5%
2012	President	Romney 63.8 – 34.0%
2012	Senator	Emken 64.0 – 36.0%

== List of assembly members representing the district ==
Due to redistricting, the 34th district has been moved around different parts of the state. The current iteration resulted from the 2021 redistricting by the California Citizens Redistricting Commission.

Assembly members	Party	Years served	Counties represented	Notes
Frank W. Hussey	Republican	January 5, 1885 – January 3, 1887	San Francisco	
Michael H. Barry	Republican	January 3, 1887 – January 7, 1889	San Francisco	
E. J. Reynolds	Democratic	January 7, 1889 – January 5, 1891	San Francisco	
A. L. Lux	Republican	January 5, 1891 – January 2, 1893	San Francisco	
R. J. Luttringer	Democratic	January 2, 1893 – January 7, 1895	San Francisco	
Mark A. Devine	Democratic	January 7, 1895 – January 4, 1897	San Francisco	
Frank Mahoney	Democratic	January 4, 1897 – January 2, 1899	San Francisco	
John Joseph Crowley	Democratic	January 2, 1899 – January 1, 1901	San Francisco	
Edward D. Knight	Republican	January 1, 1901 – January 5, 1903	San Francisco	
William H. Gleeson	Republican	January 5, 1903 – January 2, 1905	San Francisco	
Fred V. Severance	Republican	January 2, 1905 – January 7, 1907	San Francisco	
John McKeon	Democratic	January 7, 1907 – January 4, 1909	San Francisco	
Florence J. O'Neill	Democratic	January 4, 1909 – January 2, 1911	San Francisco	
Thomas J. Feeley	Republican	January 2, 1911 – January 6, 1913	San Francisco	
George Beck	Democratic	January 6, 1913 – January 8, 1917	Alameda	
J. Leonard Rose	Republican	January 8, 1917 – January 3, 1921	Alameda	
E. H. Christian	Republican	January 3, 1921 – January 5, 1925	Alameda	
William P. Jost	Republican	January 5, 1925 – January 2, 1933	Alameda	
Clifford R. Kallam	Democratic	January 2, 1933 – January 4, 1937	San Benito, Santa Cruz	
Jacob M. Leonard	Republican	January 4, 1937 – January 4, 1943	San Benito, Santa Cruz	
James G. Crichton	Democratic	January 4, 1943 – January 8, 1951	Fresno	
Wallace Henderson	Democratic	January 8, 1951 – January 5, 1953	Fresno	
James W. Silliman	Republican	January 5, 1953 – January 3, 1955	Monteray	
Alan G. Pattee	Republican	January 3, 1955 – April 19, 1969	Monteray	Killed in a car accident by a drunk driver.
Alan G. Pattee	Republican	January 3, 1955 – April 19, 1969	Monterey, Santa Cruz	Killed in a car accident by a drunk driver.
Alan G. Pattee	Republican	January 3, 1955 – April 19, 1969	Monterey	Killed in a car accident by a drunk driver.
Vacant		April 19, 1969 – June 23, 1969	Monterey	
Robert G. Wood	Republican	June 23, 1969 – November 30, 1974	Monterey	Sworn in after winning a special election when Alan Pattee died in a car accident.
Larry Chimbole	Democratic	December 2, 1974 – November 30, 1978	Inyo, Kern, Los Angeles, San Bernardino	
Phil Wyman	Republican	December 4, 1978 – November 30, 1992	Inyo, Kern, Los Angeles, San Bernardino	
Phil Wyman	Republican	December 4, 1978 – November 30, 1992	Inyo, Kern, San Bernardino	
Phil Wyman	Republican	December 4, 1978 – November 30, 1992	Inyo, Kern, Los Angeles	
Kathleen M. Honeycutt	Republican	December 7, 1992 – November 30, 1994	Inyo, Kern, San Bernardino	
Keith Olberg	Republican	December 5, 1994 – November 30, 2000	Inyo, Kern, San Bernardino	
Phil Wyman	Republican	December 4, 2000 – November 30, 2002	Inyo, Kern, San Bernardino	
Bill Maze	Republican	December 2, 2002 – November 30, 2008	Inyo, Kern, San Bernardino, Tulare	
Connie Conway	Republican	December 1, 2008 – November 30, 2012	Inyo, Kern, San Bernardino, Tulare	
Shannon Grove	Republican	December 3, 2012 – November 30, 2016	Kern	
Vince Fong	Republican	December 5, 2016 – November 30, 2022	Kern	
Tom Lackey	Republican	December 2, 2022 – present	Kern, Los Angeles, San Bernardino	
Charles Hughes	Republican	December 2026 – present		

== Election results (1990–present) ==
=== 2024 ===
2024 California State Assembly 34th district election
Primary election
Party	Candidate	Votes	%
Republican	Tom Lackey (incumbent)	58,283	66.1
Democratic	Ricardo Ortega	29,848	33.9
Total votes		88,131	100.0
General election
Republican	Tom Lackey (incumbent)	117,751	62.0
Democratic	Ricardo Ortega	72,152	38.0
Total votes		189,903	100.0
Republican hold			

=== 2022 ===
2022 California State Assembly 34th district election
Primary election
Party	Candidate	Votes	%
Republican	Thurston Smith (incumbent)	23,663	31.1
Republican	Tom Lackey (incumbent)	22,622	29.7
Democratic	Rita Ramirez Dean	20,384	26.8
Democratic	Raj Kahlon	4,063	5.3
Republican	Paul Fournier	3,189	4.2
No party preference	Roger LaPlante	2,122	2.8
Total votes		76,043	100.0
General election
Republican	Tom Lackey (incumbent)	63,840	56.5
Republican	Thurston Smith (incumbent)	49,183	43.5
Total votes		113,023	100.0
Republican hold			

=== 2020 ===
2020 California State Assembly 34th district election
Primary election
Party	Candidate	Votes	%
Republican	Vince Fong (incumbent)	83,909	71.6
Democratic	Julie Solis	32,922	28.1
Democratic	Regina Velasquez (write-in)	343	0.3
Total votes		117,174	100.0
General election
Republican	Vince Fong (incumbent)	146,611	68.1
Democratic	Julie Solis	68,716	31.9
Total votes		215,327	100.0
Republican hold			

=== 2018 ===
2018 California State Assembly 34th district election
Primary election
Party	Candidate	Votes	%
Republican	Vince Fong (incumbent)	65,323	76.4
Democratic	Nick Nicita	20,221	23.6
Total votes		85,544	100.0
General election
Republican	Vince Fong (incumbent)	103,346	70.6
Democratic	Nick Nicita	43,048	29.4
Total votes		146,394	100.0
Republican hold			

=== 2016 ===
2016 California State Assembly 34th district election
Primary election
Party	Candidate	Votes	%
Republican	Vince Fong	57,915	60.3
Democratic	Perrin Swanlund	23,429	24.4
Republican	Ernie Gollehon	8,779	9.1
Republican	Michael Garcia Biglay	5,886	6.1
Total votes		96,009	100.0
General election
Republican	Vince Fong	123,959	73.2
Democratic	Perrin Swanlund	45,305	26.8
Total votes		169,264	100.0
Republican hold			

=== 2014 ===
2014 California State Assembly 34th district election
Primary election
Party	Candidate	Votes	%
Republican	Shannon Grove (incumbent)	37,749	74.6
Democratic	Virginia "Mari" Goodman	12,856	25.4
Total votes		50,605	100.0
General election
Republican	Shannon Grove (incumbent)	70,403	74.3
Democratic	Virginia "Mari" Goodman	24,132	25.5
Total votes		94,535	100.0
Republican hold			

=== 2012 ===
2012 California State Assembly 34th district election
Primary election
Party	Candidate	Votes	%
Republican	Shannon Grove (incumbent)	54,345	73.7
Democratic	Mari Goodman	19,369	26.3
Total votes		73,714	100.0
General election
Republican	Shannon Grove (incumbent)	106,384	69.2
Democratic	Mari Goodman	47,254	30.8
Total votes		153,638	100.0
Republican hold			

=== 2010 ===
2010 California State Assembly 34th district election
Party	Candidate	Votes	%
Republican	Connie Conway (incumbent)	67,303	70.2
Democratic	Esmeralda Castro	28,657	29.8
Total votes		95,960	100.0
Republican hold			

=== 2008 ===
2008 California State Assembly 34th district election
Party	Candidate	Votes	%
Republican	Connie Conway	77,620	63.7
Democratic	Desmond Farrelly	44,263	36.3
Total votes		121,883	100.0
Republican hold			

=== 2006 ===
2006 California State Assembly 34th district election
Party	Candidate	Votes	%
Republican	Bill Maze (incumbent)	56,880	68.3
Democratic	Desmond Farrelly	23,575	28.3
Green	David Silva	2,793	3.4
Total votes		83,248	100.0
Republican hold			

=== 2004 ===
2004 California State Assembly 34th district election
Party	Candidate	Votes	%
Republican	Bill Maze (incumbent)	80,149	68.5
Democratic	Maggie Florez	36,819	31.5
Total votes		116,968	100.0
Republican hold			

=== 2002 ===
2002 California State Assembly 34th district election
Party	Candidate	Votes	%
Republican	Bill Maze	48,625	65.3
Democratic	Virginia R. Gurrola	25,671	34.5
No party	Joshua Miller (write-in)	221	0.2
Total votes		74,517	100.0
Republican hold			

=== 2000 ===
2000 California State Assembly 34th district election
Party	Candidate	Votes	%
Republican	Phil Wyman	79,261	65.8
Democratic	Robert "Bob" Conaway	41,203	34.2
Total votes		120,464	100.0
Republican hold			

=== 1998 ===
1998 California State Assembly 34th district election
Party	Candidate	Votes	%
Republican	Keith Olberg (incumbent)	60,374	64.1
Democratic	Steve A. Figueroa	30,444	32.3
Libertarian	Jeffrey Lang	3,319	3.5
Total votes		94,137	100.0
Republican hold			

=== 1996 ===
1996 California State Assembly 34th district election
Party	Candidate	Votes	%
Republican	Keith Olberg (incumbent)	76,248	65.3
Democratic	Lionel M. Dew	40,534	34.7
Total votes		116,782	100.0
Republican hold			

=== 1994 ===
1994 California State Assembly 34th district election
Party	Candidate	Votes	%
Republican	Keith Olberg	67,073	65.8
Democratic	Timothy G. Hauk	34,802	34.2
Total votes		101,875	100.0
Republican hold			

=== 1992 ===
1992 California State Assembly 34th district election
Party	Candidate	Votes	%
Republican	Kathleen M. Honeycutt	82,792	64.5
Democratic	Joe Green	45,533	35.5
Total votes		128,325	100.0
Republican hold			

=== 1990 ===
1990 California State Assembly 34th district election
Party	Candidate	Votes	%
Republican	Phil Wyman (incumbent)	82,329	76.1
Libertarian	Ronald Tisbert	25,831	23.9
Total votes		108,160	100.0
Republican hold			

== See also ==
- California State Assembly
- California State Assembly districts
- Districts in California
