= Jeffrey Michael =

American businessman

- Born: Jeffrey Michael; 1955 or 1956 (age 68–69)
- Known for: Founding investor and chairman of CorVel Corporation
- Spouse: married
- Children: 4

Jeffrey Michael (born 1955/1956) is a billionaire who was a founding investor of healthcare technology company CorVel Corporation.

In 1987, Michael joined with Gordon Clemons and Jim Michael and founded CorVel Corporation (originally named FORTIS), a consolidation of three small vocational rehabilitation firms then valued at $2 million with over 200 associates. As of 2022, he owns 38% of CorVal through an investment vehicle, Corstar Holdings, Inc.

Michael is married with 4 children and lives in Minnetonka, Minnesota.

Forbes lists his net worth as of April 2022 at $1.1 billion USD.
