= CorVel Corporation =

American technology company

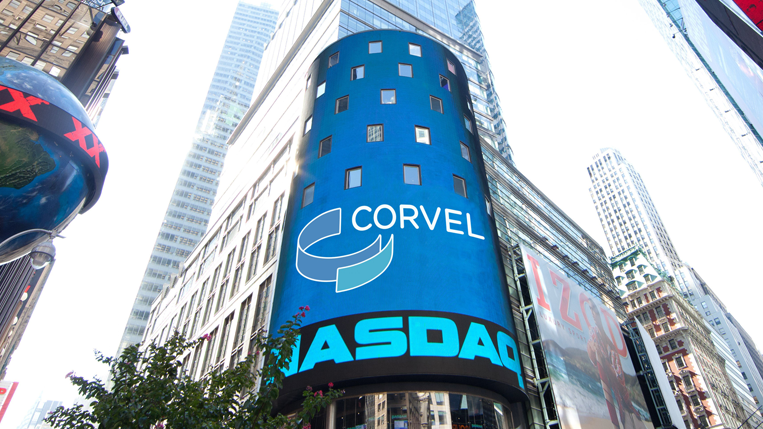
- CorVel opened the NASDAQ market in June 2016 to celebrate 25 years as a publicly traded company.
- Company type: Public
- Traded as: Nasdaq: CRVL; S&P 600 component
- Industry: Claims Management and Healthcare Management
- Founded: 1987; 39 years ago
- Headquarters: Irvine, California, United States
- Key people: V Gordon Clemons (chairman); Michael Combs (president and CEO)
- Products: Claims Management and Healthcare Management
- Revenue: ▲$592 million USD (2020) ▲$596 million USD (2019) ▲$558 million USD (2018) ▲$519 million USD (2017) ▲$504 million USD (2016) ▲$492 million USD (2015) ▲$478 million USD (2014) ▲$429 million USD (2013) ▲$413 million USD (2012) ▲$380 million USD (2011)
- Net income: $47.4 million USD (2020) $46.7 million USD (2019) $35.7 million USD (2018) $29.5 million USD (2017) $28.5 million USD (2016) $29.5 million USD (2015) $34.3 million USD (2014) $26.7 million USD (2013) $26.5 million USD (2012) $24.6 million USD (2011)
- Total assets: ▲$416 million (2020)
- Total equity: ▲$189 million (2020)
- Number of employees: 3,500 (2017)
- Website: corvel.com

CorVel Corporation is an American technology company.

== History ==
In 1987, Gordon Clemons joined with Jim Michael and Jeffrey Michael, investors from Minnesota, and founded CorVel Corporation (originally named FORTIS). Three small vocational rehabilitation firms were consolidated to form the initial foundation of the new company, valued at approximately $2 million with over 200 associates.

Within two years, the company expanded to 51 American locations, and they entered the medical bill review and medical case management business.

In 1991, the company first issued stock to the public and began trading on the NASDAQ at a market capitalization value of $46 million. The offering raised $3.5 million, net of the repayment of venture funding. The following year, the Fortis name was sold, raising $4 million and the company changed its name to CorVel Corporation. With the funding from the name sale, CorVel began building a national preferred provider organization (PPO).

During the mid '90s, CorVel doubled its office network again, and expanded its software offerings. PPO services became an important part of most healthcare management sales. Out of network medical review was added to the portfolio of provider programs.

By 2005, CorVel grew to over 2,000 clients and 15% compounded annual stock growth.

In March 2009, the company continued to expand its workers' compensation claims management solutions. During the March quarter, CorVel completed the acquisition of a third party administrator (TPA) in New York, the company's third acquisition in its TPA expansion effort. Software development efforts have been focused on the incorporation of artificial intelligence capabilities and workflow management tools in to the claims' management systems in order to enable CorVel's unique process.

In August 2010, CorVel introduced a provider look up app that can be accessed in the Apple Store and Google Play. This mobile app provides access to locate network doctors, specialists, hospitals and other facilities near the user.

In August 2011, the company also introduced a claim intake app available from Apple that provides mobile access to report workplace incidents and injuries.

In March 2012, the company announced revenues for the quarter ended March 31, 2012, that were a 4% increase over the previous quarter in 2011.

In September 2014, CorVel released a new app (My Care) that provides online access to view indemnity payments, access pharmacy cards, review treatment guidelines and review details of the workplace injury claim. The newest feature of the app provides Touch ID for iPhones that provides secure fingerprint access on iOS devices.

In August 2015, the company announced Telehealth Services as part of their existing Enterprise Comp claims management model to offer immediate access to medical providers for injured workers.

== Operations ==
CorVel had revenues of $592 million for fiscal year ending March 31, 2020.

CorVel is licensed to do business in all 50 states, the District of Columbia and Puerto Rico.

== See also ==
- Workers' compensation
- Managed Care
- Preferred Provider Organization
