= Phil Wyman =

American politician (1945–2019)

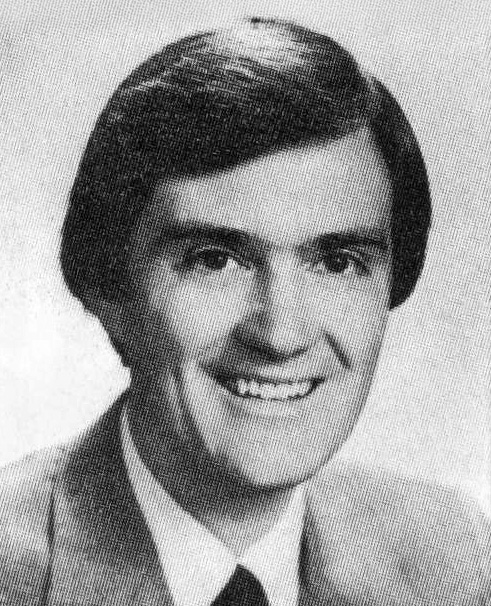
- Wyman in 1988

Member of the California State Assembly from the 34th district
- In office December 4, 2000 – November 30, 2002
- Preceded by: Keith Olberg
- Succeeded by: Bill Maze

Member of the California Senate from the 16th district
- In office May 3, 1993 – November 30, 1994
- Preceded by: Don Rogers
- Succeeded by: Jim Costa

Member of the California State Assembly from the 34th district
- In office December 4, 1978 – November 30, 1992
- Preceded by: Larry Chimbole
- Succeeded by: Kathleen Honeycutt

Personal details
- Born: February 21, 1945 Los Angeles, California, U.S.
- Died: November 28, 2019 (aged 74) Tehachapi, California, U.S.
- Party: Republican
- Spouse: Lynn (divorced)
- Children: 3
- Education: University of California, Davis; Ateneo de Manila University; University of the Pacific

Military service
- Branch/service: United States Air Force

Phillip David Wyman (February 21, 1945 – November 28, 2019) was an American politician from California. A Republican, he was a member of the California State Assembly from 1978 to 1992 and again from 2000 to 2002; he was also a member of the California State Senate from 1993 to 1994.

== Assembly races ==
Wyman was vice president of the Antelope Valley Board of Trade in 1976 when he first ran for California State Assembly from the Tehachapi-Palmdale based 34th District. He narrowly lost to Democratic incumbent Larry Chimbole but went on to defeat him two years later and served in the Assembly from 1978 until 1992, when he opted not to seek reelection and instead run for congress.

In 2000, Wyman ran again for Assembly in the 34th Assembly District, which consisted of the Mojave Desert portion of San Bernardino County (except for the Morongo valley), the eastern Kern County desert/mountains area and Inyo County. He defeated the city manager of Victorville to win the Republican nomination, and then easily won the November 2000 general election in a heavily Republican district.

In 2002, redistricting after the 2000 Census prompted Wyman to run in the new 36th Assembly District. He moved to a small apartment in Phelan, California (in the rural San Bernardino County desert) to qualify to run, which caused his political opponents to accuse him of being a carpetbagger. He narrowly lost the Republican primary to Sharon Runner of Lancaster, the wife of then-incumbent Assemblyman George Runner.

In 2006, he ran again for Assembly in the 36th Assembly District, based in Kern County, but lost the Republican primary to Bakersfield Superintendent of Schools Jean Fuller.

== Congressional race ==
The 25th Congressional district was created after the 1991 reapportionment and was centered on the new city of Santa Clarita in fast growing northern Los Angeles County. Wyman moved south from Tehachapi in Kern County to run for the new 25th. He narrowly lost the GOP primary to Santa Clarita Mayor Buck McKeon, however.

== State Senate races ==
Wyman bounced back less than a year later when he won a special election for the Fresno-based 16th state Senate district in 1993.

In 1994, despite huge Republican gains across the country, Wyman lost his state Senate seat to then Democratic Assemblyman Jim Costa (whom Wyman had defeated in the special election). He was the only Republican west of the Mississippi to be unseated. In 1996, he ran for a neighboring state Senate seat and lost the GOP primary again, this time to Palmdale area Assemblyman Pete Knight.

In 2010, he ran once more for the state Senate seat he had lost to Costa in 1994. He narrowly lost the primary to Tim Theissen, who then lost the general election to Democrat Michael J. Rubio.

== Reputation ==
Through the years Wyman gained a reputation for moving around the area in order to run for office. He originally served as an Assemblyman from Tehachapi (in Kern County), moved south to run for congress in Los Angeles County in 1992, then won election to a state Senate seat in 1993 in Fresno County (north of Kern county) before losing a state Senate primary in 1996 in Los Angeles county again.

== Return ==
In 2000, Wyman made a comeback of sorts, winning his old 34th Assembly district. Two years later, however, he made a tactical error and decided to run for reelection in the neighboring 36th district instead. He was anticipating an opening in the State Senate in 2004, a district that was outside the boundaries of his 34th Assembly district, but within those of the 36th. His plans went awry when the 36th's incumbent, fellow Republican George Runner, decided to back his wife (Sharon Runner), who actually lived within the district. Wyman narrowly lost the GOP primary, while his old 34th district was won by Republican Bill Maze, a Tulare County supervisor, who found himself unopposed after Wyman decided not to run there.

In 2004, Wyman mounted a primary challenge to then-Assembly Minority Leader and future Speaker of the United States House of Representatives Kevin McCarthy, who was seeking re-election to a second term in the 32nd district. His challenge was unsuccessful, with Wyman receiving 23% of the primary vote to McCarthy's 59%.

In 2014, Wyman was an unsuccessful candidate for Attorney General of California, losing the Republican nomination to former deputy state Attorney General Ronald Gold by just 1.2%.

In 2016, Wyman declared his candidacy in the race for the Senate seat from California being vacated by Democrat Barbara Boxer. In the June 7 primary, Wyman came in fourth in the overall field, with 247,397 total votes (4.9%), and thus was the second highest-performing Republican in the field, only behind George "Duf" Sundheim's 409,096 (8%).

== Death ==
Wyman died from cancer in Tehachapi on November 28, 2019, aged 74.

== Electoral history ==
Member, California State Assembly: 1979-1993; 2001-03 Member, California State Senate : 1993-95
Year	Office	Democrat	Votes	Pct	Republican	Votes	Pct			
1976	California State Assembly; District 34	Larry Chimbole	44,154	50.6%	Phil Wyman	43,086	49.4%			
1978	California State Assembly; District 34	Larry Chimbole	36,928	45.7%	Phil Wyman	43,845	54.3%			
1980	California State Assembly; District 34	Gloria A. Dizmang	28,971	26.9%	Phil Wyman	78,649	73.1%			
1982	California State Assembly; District 34	none			Phil Wyman	84,963	100%			
1984	California State Assembly; District 34	Cindy Shaw O'Connor	43,019	33.9%	Phil Wyman	83,936	66.1%			
1986	California State Assembly; District 34	Richard Dearborn	30,681	29.8%	Phil Wyman	72,220	70.2%			
1988	California State Assembly; District 34	Earl J. Wilson	41,998	29.3%	Phil Wyman	98,577	68.8%			
1990	California State Assembly; District 34	none			Phil Wyman	82,329	76.1%	Rich Tisbert	25,831	23.9%
1992	U.S House of Representatives; District 25	James Gilmartin	67,687	33.3%	Buck McKeon 40% Phil Wyman 38.5%	104,552	52%			
1993	California State Senate; District 16 (special election)	Jim Costa	43,807	47.3%	Phil Wyman	48,768	52.7%			
1994	California State Senate; District 16	Jim Costa	59,022	51.6%	Phil Wyman	56,867	48.4%			
1996	California State Senate; District 17	Steven Figueroa	81,962	33.4%	Jim Cox 15% Pete Knight 46% Phil Wyman 39%	163,531	66.6%			
2000	California State Assembly; District 34	Robert "Bob" Conway	40,968	34.2%	Phil Wyman	78,830	65.8%			
2002	California State Assembly; District 36	Robert Davenport	25,853	36.1%	Sharon Runner 39.6% Phil Wyman 32.5%	45,856	65.8%			
2004	California State Assembly; District 32	Marvin Armas	35,130	21.3%	Kevin McCarthy 58.9% Phil Wyman 22.5%	129,510	78.7%			
2006	California State Assembly; District 32	Maribel Vega	33,594	28.3%	Jean Fuller 55.6% Phil Wyman 22.2%	85,055	71.7%			
2010	California State Senate; District 16	Michael J. Rubio	71,334	60.4%	Tim Thiesen 50.6% Phil Wyman 49.4%	46,717	39.6%			

California Assembly
Preceded by Larry Chimbole	Member of the California State Assembly from the 34th district December 4, 1978 - November 30, 1992	Succeeded by Kathleen Honeycutt
Preceded by Keith Olberg	Member of the California State Assembly from the 34th district December 4, 2000 - November 30, 2002	Succeeded by Bill Maze
California Senate
Preceded by Don Rogers	Member of the California State from the 16th district May 3, 1993 - November 30, 1994	Succeeded by Jim Costa
