= 2026 California State Assembly election =

- November 3, 2026

All 80 seats in the California State Assembly 41 seats needed for a majority
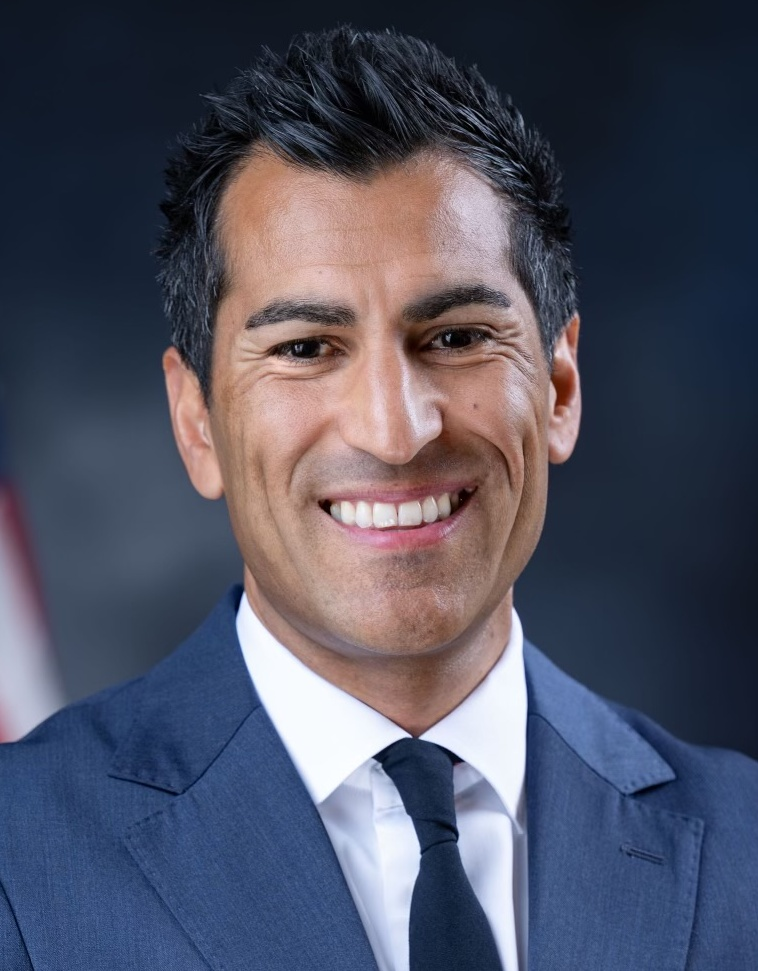

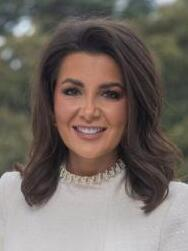
	Majority party	Minority party
Leader	Robert Rivas	Alexandra Macedo (lost re-election)
Party	Democratic	Republican
Leader since	June 30, 2023	August 3, 2026
Leader's seat	29th–Hollister	33rd–Tulare
Last election	60 seats, 58.76%	20 seats, 40.64%
Seats before	60	19
Seats won	67	12
Seat change	▲7	▼7
- Democratic gain Democratic hold Republican hold Result not yet called
Speaker before election
Robert Rivas
Democratic
Elected Speaker
Democratic

The 2026 California State Assembly election was held on Tuesday, November 3, 2026. The primary election was held on June 2, 2026. All of the seats of the California State Assembly were elected as part of the 2026 California elections.

Democrats gained at least seven seats for a total of 67. The next legislature will feature the largest majority for the party in state history, breaking the record of 62 the Democrats set four years prior.

== Outgoing incumbents ==
=== Term-limited or running for other office ===
==== Democrats ====
- 12th: Damon Connolly is running for state senate.
- 27th: Esmeralda Soria is running for state senate.
- 31st: Joaquin Arambula is running for Fresno City Council.
- 35th: Jasmeet Bains is running for the U.S. House of Representatives.
- 42nd: Jacqui Irwin is term-limited and running for the U.S. House of Representatives.
- 65th: Mike Gipson is term-limited and running for the State Board of Equalization.
- 66th: Al Muratsuchi is term-limited and running for Superintendent of Public Instruction.
- 67th: Sharon Quirk-Silva is term-limited.
- 68th: Avelino Valencia is running for state senate.

==== Republicans ====
- 32nd: Stan Ellis is retiring.
- 34th: Tom Lackey is term-limited.
- 72nd: Diane Dixon is running for the Orange County Board of Supervisors.

=== Lost re-election ===
==== Republicans ====
- 7th: Josh Hoover lost to Democrat Amy Slavensky.
- 33rd: Alexandra Macedo lost to Democrat Hipolito Cerros.
- 36th: Jeff Gonzalez lost to Democrat Ida Obeso-Martinez.
- 47th: Greg Wallis lost to Democrat Leila Namvar.
- 58th: Leticia Castillo lost to Democrat Clarissa Cervantes.
- 70th: Tri Ta lost to Democrat Paula Swift.
- 74th: Laurie Davies lost to Democrat Sergio Farias.

== Predictions ==
Source	Ranking	As of
Sabato's Crystal Ball	Safe D	January 22, 2026
State Navigate	Safe D	October 14, 2026

== Summary by district ==
† - Incumbent not seeking re-election

District	2024 Pres.	Incumbent	Party	Elected Member	Party
1st	R+16.1	Heather Hadwick	Rep	Heather Hadwick	Rep
2nd	D+34.8	Chris Rogers	Dem	Chris Rogers	Dem
3rd	R+19.2	Vacant (Note: Republican James Gallagher resigned on June 9, 2026 after being elected as a member of the US House of Representatives for CA-1 in a special election to succeed Doug LaMalfa triggered by LaMalfa's death on January 6, 2026.)		Dom Belza	Rep
4th	D+30.0	Cecilia Aguiar-Curry	Dem	Cecilia Aguiar-Curry	Dem
5th	R+10.7	Joe Patterson	Rep	Joe Patterson	Rep
6th	D+34.0	Maggy Krell	Dem	Maggy Krell	Dem
7th	D+4.5	Josh Hoover	Rep	Amy Slavensky	Dem
8th	R+18.3	David Tangipa	Rep	David Tangipa	Rep
9th	R+23.3	Heath Flora	Rep	Heath Flora	Rep
10th	D+27.9	Stephanie Nguyen	Dem	Stephanie Nguyen	Dem
11th	D+19.6	Lori Wilson	Dem	Lori Wilson	Dem
12th	D+55.6	Damon Connolly†	Dem	Jackie Elward	Dem
13th	D+13.4	Rhodesia Ransom	Dem	Rhodesia Ransom	Dem
14th	D+71.5	Buffy Wicks	Dem	Buffy Wicks	Dem
15th	D+31.8	Anamarie Avila Farias	Dem	Anamarie Avila Farias	Dem
16th	D+36.4	Rebecca Bauer-Kahan	Dem	Rebecca Bauer-Kahan	Dem
17th	D+67.3	Matt Haney	Dem	Matt Haney	Dem
18th	D+72.1	Mia Bonta	Dem	Mia Bonta	Dem
19th	D+57.4	Catherine Stefani	Dem	Catherine Stefani	Dem
20th	D+40.3	Liz Ortega	Dem	Liz Ortega	Dem
21st	D+50.6	Diane Papan	Dem	Diane Papan	Dem
22nd	R+7.5	Juan Alanis	Rep	Juan Alanis	Rep
23rd	D+54.5	Marc Berman	Dem	Marc Berman	Dem
24th	D+30.6	Alex Lee	Dem	Alex Lee	Dem
25th	D+32.4	Ash Kalra	Dem	Ash Kalra	Dem
26th	D+45.3	Patrick Ahrens	Dem	Patrick Ahrens	Dem
27th	R+2.6	Esmeralda Soria†	Dem	Brian Pacheco	Dem
28th	D+40.3	Gail Pellerin	Dem	Gail Pellerin	Dem
29th	D+44.0	Robert Rivas	Dem	Robert Rivas	Dem
30th	D+27.2	Dawn Addis	Dem	Dawn Addis	Dem
31st	D+13.1	Joaquin Arambula†	Dem	Annalisa Perea	Dem
32nd	R+33.2	Stan Ellis†	Rep	David Couch	Rep
33rd	R+18.5	Alexandra Macedo	Rep	Hipolito Cerros	Dem
34th	R+19.8	Tom Lackey†	Rep	Charles Hughes	Rep
35th	D+0.4	Jasmeet Bains†	Dem	Andrae Gonzales	Dem
36th	R+1.2	Jeff Gonzalez	Rep	Ida Obeso-Martinez	Dem
37th	D+24.0	Gregg Hart	Dem	Gregg Hart	Dem
38th	D+23.9	Steve Bennett	Dem	Steve Bennett	Dem
39th	D+9.2	Juan Carrillo	Dem	Juan Carrillo	Dem
40th	D+8.4	Pilar Schiavo	Dem	Pilar Schiavo	Dem
41st	D+21.4	John Harabedian	Dem	John Harabedian	Dem
42nd	D+14.2	Jacqui Irwin†	Dem	Deborah Klein Lopez	Dem
43rd	D+29.7	Celeste Rodriguez	Dem	Celeste Rodriguez	Dem
44th	D+32.9	Nick Schultz	Dem	Nick Schultz	Dem
45th	D+12.2	James Ramos	Dem	James Ramos	Dem
46th	D+25.9	Jesse Gabriel	Dem	Jesse Gabriel	Dem
47th	D+4.1	Greg Wallis	Rep	Leila Namvar	Dem
48th	D+16.6	Blanca Rubio	Dem	Blanca Rubio	Dem
49th	D+23.7	Mike Fong	Dem	Mike Fong	Dem
50th	D+9.7	Robert Garcia	Dem	Robert Garcia	Dem
51st	D+52.0	Rick Zbur	Dem	Rick Zbur	Dem
52nd	D+53.6	Jessica Caloza	Dem	Jessica Caloza	Dem
53rd	D+12.0	Michelle Rodriguez	Dem	Michelle Rodriguez	Dem
54th	D+43.9	Mark Gonzalez	Dem	Mark Gonzalez	Dem
55th	D+62.2	Isaac Bryan	Dem	Isaac Bryan	Dem
56th	D+17.8	Lisa Calderon	Dem	Lisa Calderon	Dem
57th	D+52.6	Sade Elhawary	Dem	Sade Elhawary	Dem
58th	D+4.0	Leticia Castillo	Rep	Clarissa Cervantes	Dem
59th	R+6.4	Phillip Chen	Rep	Phillip Chen	Rep
60th	D+8.4	Corey Jackson	Dem	Corey Jackson	Dem
61st	D+56.9	Tina McKinnor	Dem	Tina McKinnor	Dem
62nd	D+28.8	Jose Solache	Dem	Jose Solache	Dem
63rd	R+12.8	Natasha Johnson	Rep	Natasha Johnson	Rep
64th	D+16.2	Blanca Pacheco	Dem	Blanca Pacheco	Dem
65th	D+43.5	Mike Gipson†	Dem	Ayanna Davis	Dem
66th	D+23.3	Al Muratsuchi†	Dem	Paul Seo	Dem
67th	D+10.4	Sharon Quirk-Silva†	Dem	Mark Pulido	Dem
68th	D+22.3	Avelino Valencia†	Dem	Jessie Lopez	Dem
69th	D+38.2	Josh Lowenthal	Dem	Josh Lowenthal	Dem
70th	R+3.1	Tri Ta	Rep	Paula Swift	Dem
71st	R+11.0	Kate Sanchez	Rep	Kate Sanchez	Rep
72nd	R+2.7	Diane Dixon†	Rep		
73rd	D+16.6	Cottie Petrie-Norris	Dem	Cottie Petrie-Norris	Dem
74th	D+1.8	Laurie Davies	Rep	Sergio Farias	Dem
75th	R+13.9	Carl DeMaio	Rep	Carl DeMaio	Rep
76th	D+12.6	Darshana Patel	Dem	Darshana Patel	Dem
77th	D+29.3	Tasha Boerner	Dem	Tasha Boerner	Dem
78th	D+36.3	Chris Ward	Dem	Chris Ward	Dem
79th	D+22.5	LaShae Sharp-Collins	Dem	LaShae Sharp-Collins	Dem
80th	D+17.1	David Alvarez	Dem	David Alvarez	Dem

== District 1 ==
2026 California's 1st State Assembly district election
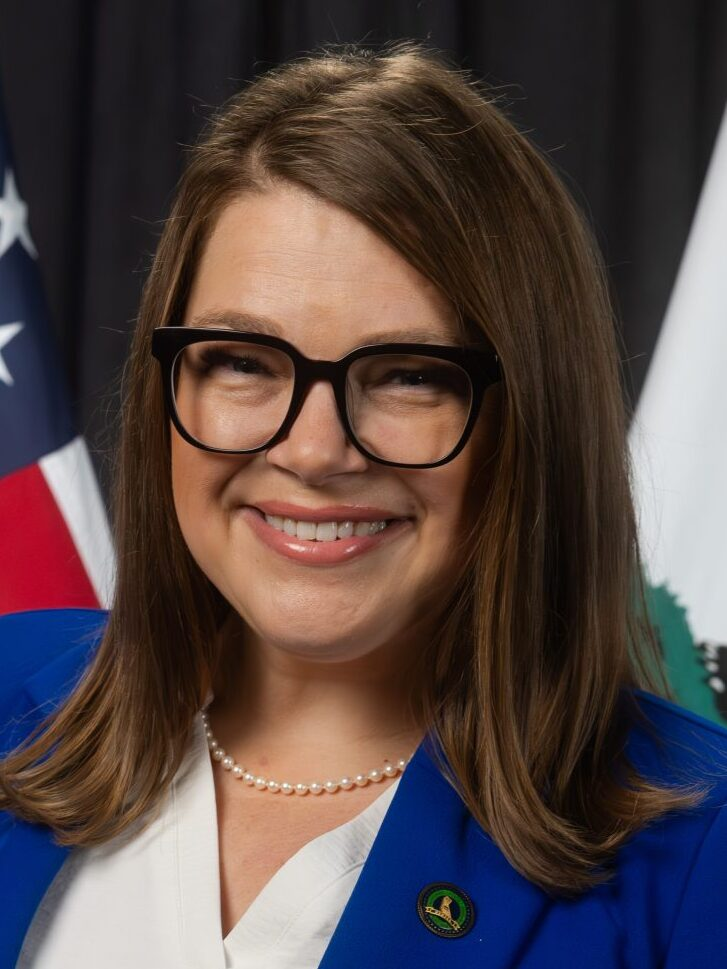

Candidate	Heather Hadwick	Dianna James
Party	Republican	Democratic
Popular vote	122,196	86,322
Percentage	58.6%	41.4%
State assemblymember before election
Heather Hadwick
Republican
State assemblymember after election
Heather Hadwick
Republican

Incumbent Republican Heather Hadwick was first elected in 2024 with 59.8% of the vote. Harwick is seeking re-election to her second term in office.

=== Candidates ===
==== Declared ====
- Heather Hadwick (Republican), incumbent state assemblymember
- Darin Hale (Republican), Anderson city councilor (2024–present)
- Dianna Margaret James (Democratic), community organizer

=== Endorsements ===
Heather Hadwick (R)

Newspapers

- The Sacramento Bee

=== Results ===
2026 California's 1st State Assembly district election
Primary election
Party	Candidate	Votes	%
Republican	Heather Hadwick (incumbent)	79,748	48.7
Democratic	Dianna Margaret James	63,056	38.5
Republican	Darin Hale	21,012	12.8
Total votes		163,816	100.0
General election
Republican	Heather Hadwick (incumbent)	122,196	58.6
Democratic	Dianna Margaret James	86,322	41.4
Total votes		208,518	100.0
Republican hold			

== District 2 ==
2026 California's 2nd State Assembly district election
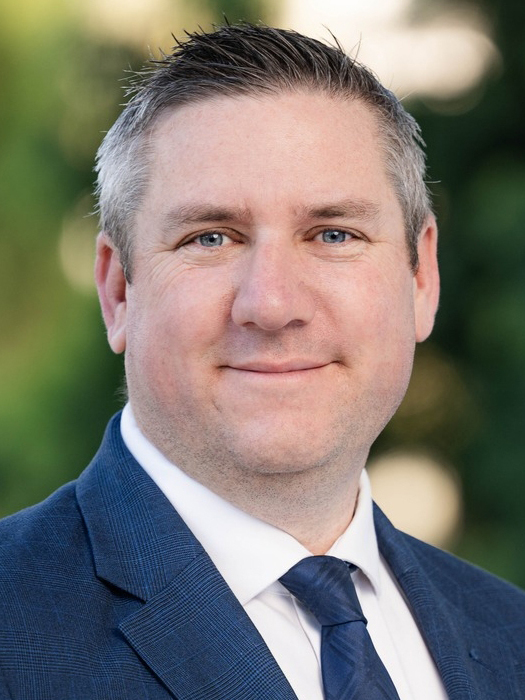

Candidate	Chris Rogers	Michael Greer
Party	Democratic	Republican
Popular vote	146,367	59,237
Percentage	71.2%	28.8%
State assemblymember before election
Chris Rogers
Democratic
State assemblymember after election
Chris Rogers
Democratic

Incumbent Democrat Chris Rogers was first elected in 2024 with 65.9% of the vote. Rogers is seeking re-election to his second term in office.

=== Candidates ===
==== Declared ====
- Michael Greer (Republican), Del Norte County School Board trustee and runner-up for the district in 2024
- Chris Rogers (Democratic), incumbent assemblymember

=== Endorsements ===
Chris Rogers (D)

Organizations

- Center for Biological Diversity Action Fund

Political parties

- California Democratic Party
- California Working Families Party

=== Results ===
2026 California's 2nd State Assembly district election
Primary election
Party	Candidate	Votes	%
Democratic	Chris Rogers (incumbent)	107,900	69.7
Republican	Michael Greer	46,846	30.3
Total votes		154,746	100.0
General election
Democratic	Chris Rogers (incumbent)	146,367	71.2
Republican	Michael Greer	59,237	28.8
Total votes		205,604	100.0
Democratic hold			

== District 3 ==
2026 California's 3rd State Assembly district election
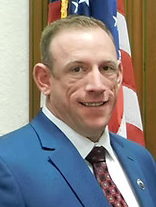

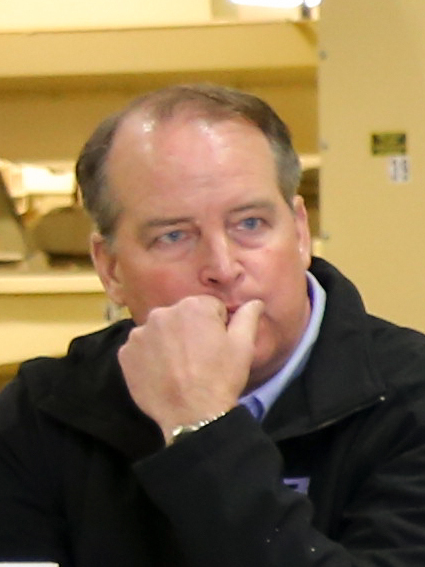
Candidate	Dom Belza	Jamie Johansson
Party	Republican	Republican
Popular vote	81,028	63,098
Percentage	56.2%	43.8%
State assemblymember before election
James Gallagher
Republican
State assemblymember after election
Dom Belza
Republican

Incumbent Republican James Gallagher was re-elected in 2024 with 66.3% of the vote. Gallagher resigned in 2026 after being elected to the United States House of Representatives in a special election.

=== Candidates ===
==== Declared ====
- Dom Belza (Republican), former Marysville city councilor (2020–2024)
- Andrew Coolidge (Republican), former mayor of Chico (2020–2024)
- Jamie Johansson (Republican), former president of the California Farm Bureau

=== Endorsements ===
Dom Belza (R)

U.S. representatives

- Kevin Kiley, CA-03 (2023–present) (Independent)
- James Gallagher, CA-01 (2026-present)
Andrew Coolidge (R)

Newspapers

- Chico Enterprise-Record
- Daily News
- Oroville Mercury-Register
- The Sacramento Bee
James Johansson (R)

U.S. representatives

- Tom McClintock, CA-05 (2009–present)

=== Results ===
2026 California's 3rd State Assembly district election
Primary election
Party	Candidate	Votes	%
Republican	Dom Belza	46,076	45.2
Republican	James "Jamie" Johansson	29,828	29.3
Republican	Andrew Coolidge	26,029	25.5
Total votes		101,933	100.0
General election
Republican	Dom Belza	81,028	56.2
Republican	James "Jamie" Johansson	63,098	43.8
Total votes		144,126	100.0
Republican hold			

== District 4 ==
2026 California's 4th State Assembly district election
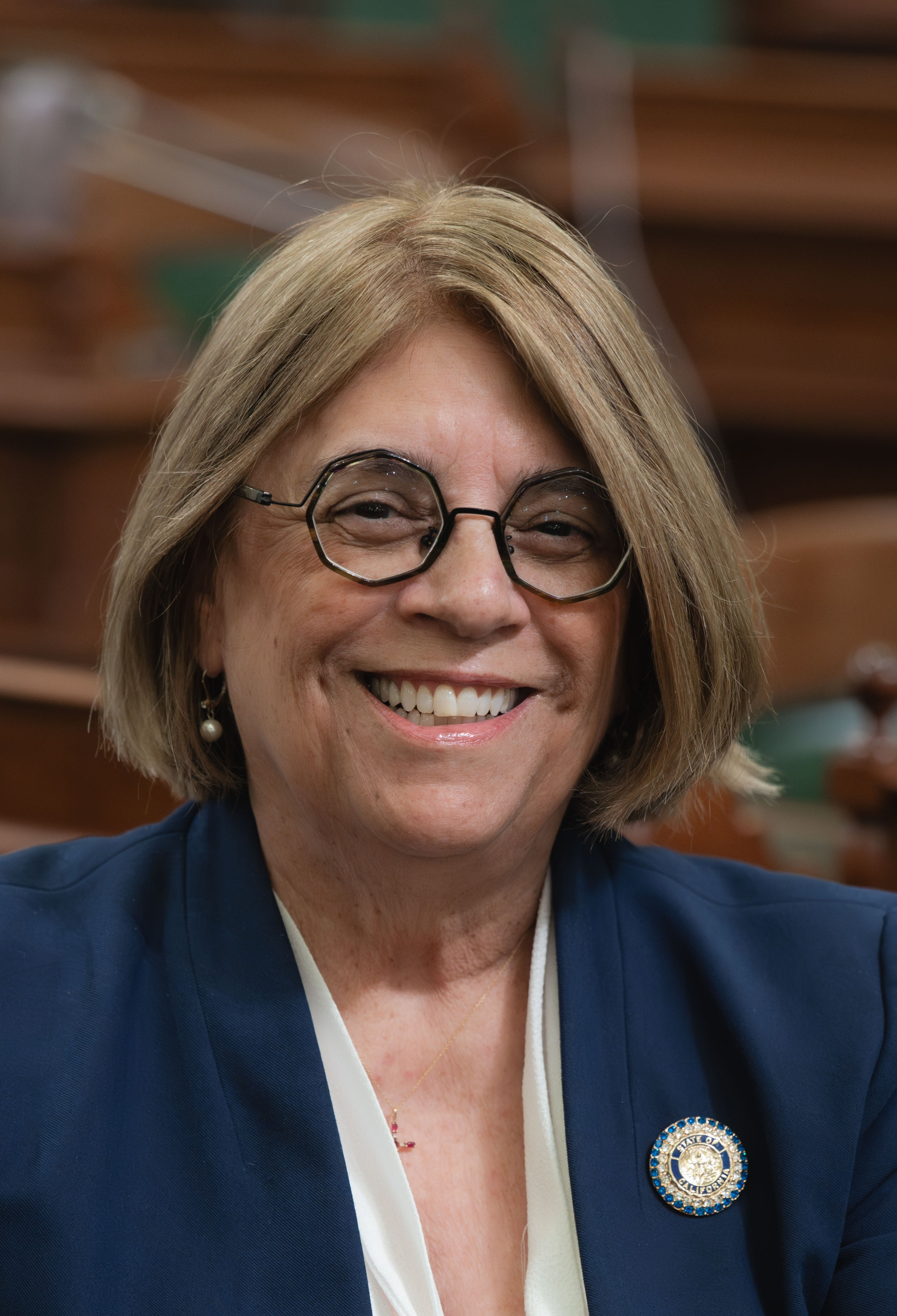
Candidate	Cecilia Aguiar-Curry
Party	Democratic
Popular vote	133,633
Percentage	100.0%
State assemblymember before election
Cecilia Aguiar-Curry
Democratic
State assemblymember after election
Cecilia Aguiar-Curry
Democratic

Incumbent Democrat Cecilia Aguiar-Curry was re-elected in 2024 with 66.5% of the vote. Aguiar-Curry is seeking re-election and is running unopposed for her sixth and final term in office.

=== Candidates ===
==== Declared ====
- Cecilia Aguiar-Curry (Democratic), incumbent state assemblymember and majority leader

=== Endorsements ===
Cecilia Aguiar-Curry (D)

Political parties

- California Democratic Party

Newspapers

- The Sacramento Bee

=== Results ===
2026 California's 4th State Assembly district election
Primary election
Party	Candidate	Votes	%
Democratic	Cecilia Aguiar-Curry (incumbent)	90,380	100.0
Total votes		90,380	100.0
General election
Democratic	Cecilia Aguiar-Curry (incumbent)	133,633	100.0
Total votes		133,633	100.0
Democratic hold			

== District 5 ==
2026 California's 5th State Assembly district election
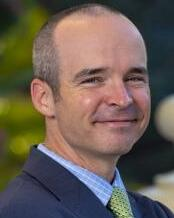

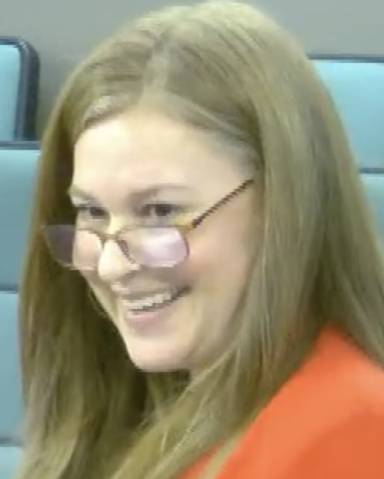
Candidate	Joe Patterson	Neva Parker
Party	Republican	Democratic
Popular vote	135,661	102,516
Percentage	57.0%	43.0%
State assemblymember before election
Joe Patterson
Republican
State assemblymember after election
Joe Patterson
Republican

Incumbent Republican Joe Patterson was re-elected in 2024 with 62.0% of the vote. Patterson is seeking re-election to his third term in office.

=== Candidates ===
==== Declared ====
- Neva Parker (Democratic), vice chair of the Roseville Grants Advisory Commission and runner-up for this district in 2024
- Joe Patterson (Republican), incumbent state assemblymember

=== Endorsements ===
Neva Parker (D)

Political parties

- California Democratic Party
Joe Patterson (R)

Political parties

- California Republican Party

Newspapers

- The Sacramento Bee

=== Results ===
2026 California's 5th State Assembly district election
Primary election
Party	Candidate	Votes	%
Republican	Joe Patterson (incumbent)	109,708	60.1
Democratic	Neva Parker	72,855	39.9
Total votes		182,563	100.0
General election
Republican	Joe Patterson (incumbent)	135,661	57.0
Democratic	Neva Parker	102,516	43.0
Total votes		238,177	100.0
Republican hold			

== District 6 ==
2026 California's 6th State Assembly district election
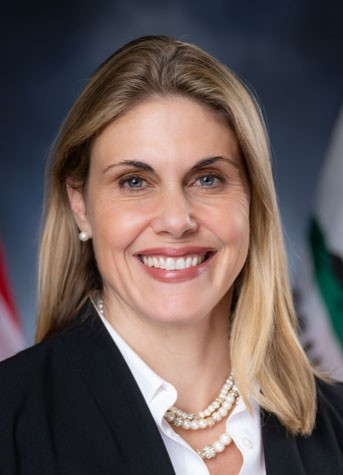

Candidate	Maggy Krell	Jagtar Singh
Party	Democratic	Democratic
Popular vote	125,455	24,647
Percentage	83.6%	16.4%
State assemblymember before election
Maggy Krell
Democratic
State assemblymember after election
Maggy Krell
Democratic

Incumbent Democrat Maggy Krell was first elected in 2024 with 66.9% of the vote. Krell is seeking re-election to her second term in office.

=== Candidates ===
==== Declared ====
- Maggy Krell (Democratic), incumbent state assemblymember
- Jagtar Singh (Democratic), caregiver

=== Endorsements ===
Maggy Krell (D)

Political parties

- California Democratic Party

Newspapers

- The Sacramento Bee

=== Results ===
2026 California's 6th State Assembly district election
Primary election
Party	Candidate	Votes	%
Democratic	Maggy Krell (incumbent)	83,563	85.9
Democratic	Jagtar Singh	13,752	14.1
Total votes		97,315	100.0
General election
Democratic	Maggy Krell (incumbent)	125,455	83.6
Democratic	Jagtar Singh	24,647	16.4
Total votes		150,102	100.0
Democratic hold			

== District 7 ==
2026 California's 7th State Assembly district election

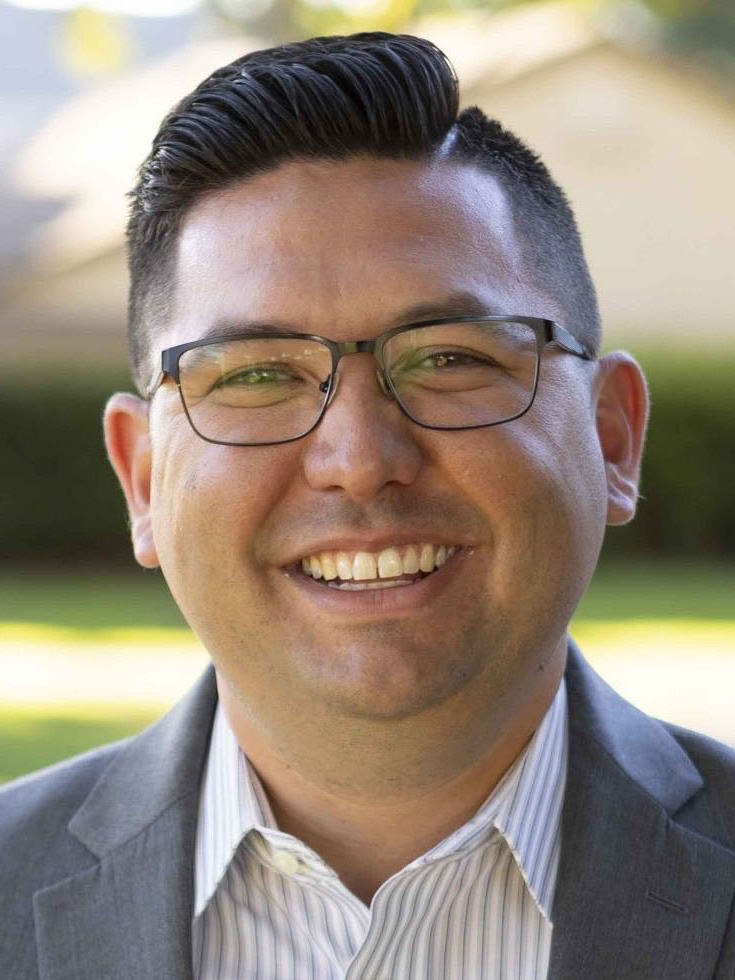
Candidate	Amy Slavensky	Josh Hoover
Party	Democratic	Republican
Popular vote	99,181	86,621
Percentage	53.4%	46.6%
State assemblymember before election
Josh Hoover
Republican
State assemblymember after election
Amy Slavensky
Democratic

Incumbent Republican Josh Hoover was re-elected in 2024 with 53.6% of the vote. Hoover lost re-election for his third term in office to Democrat and former interim deputy Superintendent for the San Juan Unified School District Amy Slavensky.

=== Candidates ===
==== Declared ====
- Josh Hoover (Republican), incumbent state assemblymember
- Sanaz Motamedi (American Independent), realtor
- Amy Slavensky (Democratic), educator and former interim deputy Superintendent for the San Juan Unified School District (2023–2025)

==== Withdrawn ====
- Chris Hoang (Democratic), activist

=== Endorsements ===
Josh Hoover (R)

Political parties

- California Republican Party

Newspapers

- The Sacramento Bee
Amy Slavensky (D)

Political parties

- California Democratic Party

=== Results ===
2026 California's 7th State Assembly district election
Primary election
Party	Candidate	Votes	%
Republican	Josh Hoover (incumbent)	65,279	50.9
Democratic	Amy Slavensky	60,513	47.1
American Independent	Sanaz Motamedi	2,549	2.0
Total votes		128,341	100.0
General election
Democratic	Amy Slavensky	99,181	53.4
Republican	Josh Hoover (incumbent)	86,621	46.6
Total votes		185,802	100.0
Democratic gain from Republican			

== District 8 ==
2026 California's 8th State Assembly district election
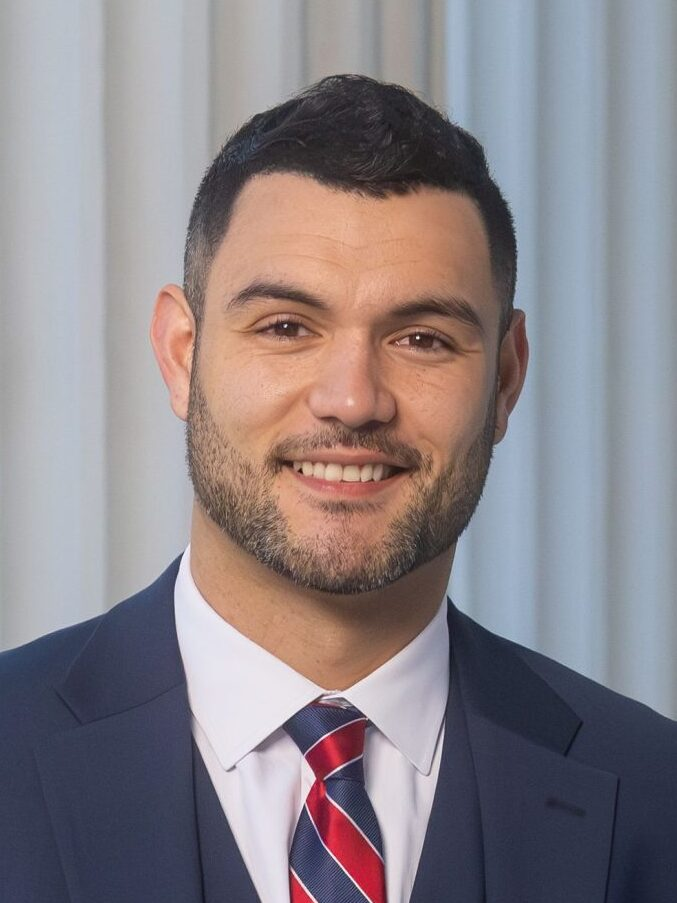
Candidate	David Tangipa
Party	Republican
Popular vote	137,805
Percentage	100.0%
State assemblymember before election
David Tangipa
Republican
State assemblymember after election
David Tangipa
Republican

Incumbent Republican David Tangipa was first elected in 2024 with 53.7% of the vote. Tangipa is seeking re-election and is running unopposed for his second term in office.

=== Candidates ===
==== Declared ====
- David Tangipa (Republican), incumbent state assemblymember

==== Endorsements ====
David Tangipa (R)

Political parties

- California Republican Party

=== Results ===
2026 California's 8th State Assembly district election
Primary election
Party	Candidate	Votes	%
Republican	David Tangipa (incumbent)	103,817	100.0
Total votes		103,817	100.0
General election
Republican	David Tangipa (incumbent)	137,805	100.0
Total votes		137,805	100.0
Republican hold			

== District 9 ==
2026 California's 9th State Assembly district election
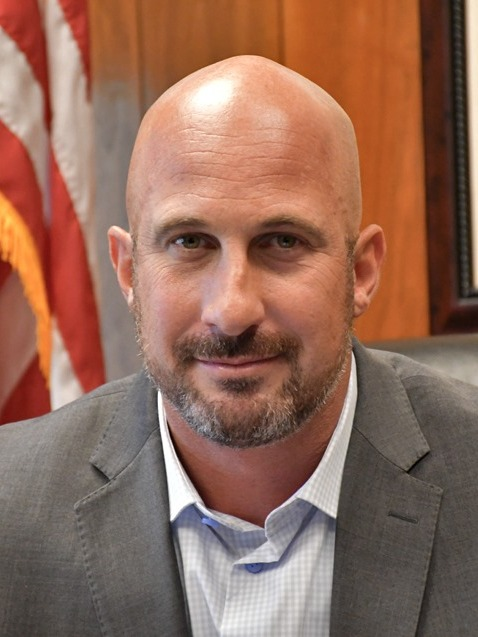

Candidate	Heath Flora	Matthew Adams
Party	Republican	Democratic
Popular vote	93,301	72,491
Percentage	56.3%	43.7%
State assemblymember before election
Heath Flora
Republican
State assemblymember after election
Heath Flora
Republican

Incumbent Republican assemblymember and former minority leader Heath Flora was re-elected in 2024 with 70.1% of the vote. Flora is seeking re-election to his sixth and final term in office.

=== Candidates ===
==== Declared ====
- Matthew Adams (Democratic), organizer and educator
- Heath Flora (Republican), incumbent state assemblymember and former minority leader
- Tami Nobriga (Republican), marketing director and mother
- Brandon Owen (Republican), rancher
- Michael Perez (Democratic), water treatment operator
- Jim Shoemaker (Republican), businessman and runner-up for California's 5th senatorial district in 2024

==== Endorsements ====
Matthew Adams (D)

Organizations

- Center for Biological Diversity Action Fund
- Run for Something

Political parties

- California Democratic Party
Brandon Owen (R)

Newspapers

- The Sacramento Bee

=== Results ===
2026 California's 9th State Assembly district election
Primary election
Party	Candidate	Votes	%
Republican	Heath Flora (incumbent)	33,684	30.6
Democratic	Matthew Adams	28,522	25.9
Republican	Jim Shoemaker	25,029	22.7
Democratic	Michael Perez	10,224	9.3
Republican	Brandon Owen	9,460	8.6
Republican	Tami Nobriga	3,285	3.0
Total votes		110,204	100.0
General election
Republican	Heath Flora (incumbent)	93,301	56.3
Democratic	Matthew Adams	72,491	43.7
Total votes		165,792	100.0
Democratic hold			

== District 10 ==
2026 California's 10th State Assembly district election
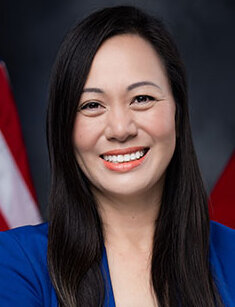

Candidate	Stephanie Nguyen	Vinaya Singh
Party	Democratic	Republican
Popular vote	117,563	41,351
Percentage	74.0	26.0
State assemblymember before election
Stephanie Nguyen
Democratic
State assemblymember after election
Stephanie Nguyen
Democratic

Incumbent Democrat Stephanie Nguyen was re-elected in 2024 with 67.6% of the vote. Nguyen is seeking re-election to her third term in office in a rematch against her 2024 opponent, engineer Vinaya Singh.

=== Candidates ===
==== Declared ====
- Stephanie Nguyen (Democratic), incumbent state assemblymember
- Vinaya Singh (Republican), retired engineer and runner-up for the district in 2024

=== Endorsements ===
Stephanie Nguyen (D)

Political parties

- California Democratic Party

Newspapers

- The Sacramento Bee

=== Results ===
2026 California's 10th State Assembly district election
Primary election
Party	Candidate	Votes	%
Democratic	Stephanie Nguyen (incumbent)	75,220	71.7
Republican	Vinaya Singh	29,645	28.3
Total votes		104,865	100.0
General election
Democratic	Stephanie Nguyen (incumbent)	117,563	74.0
Republican	Vinaya Singh	41,351	26.0
Total votes		158,914	100.0
Democratic hold			

== District 11 ==
2026 California's 11th State Assembly district election
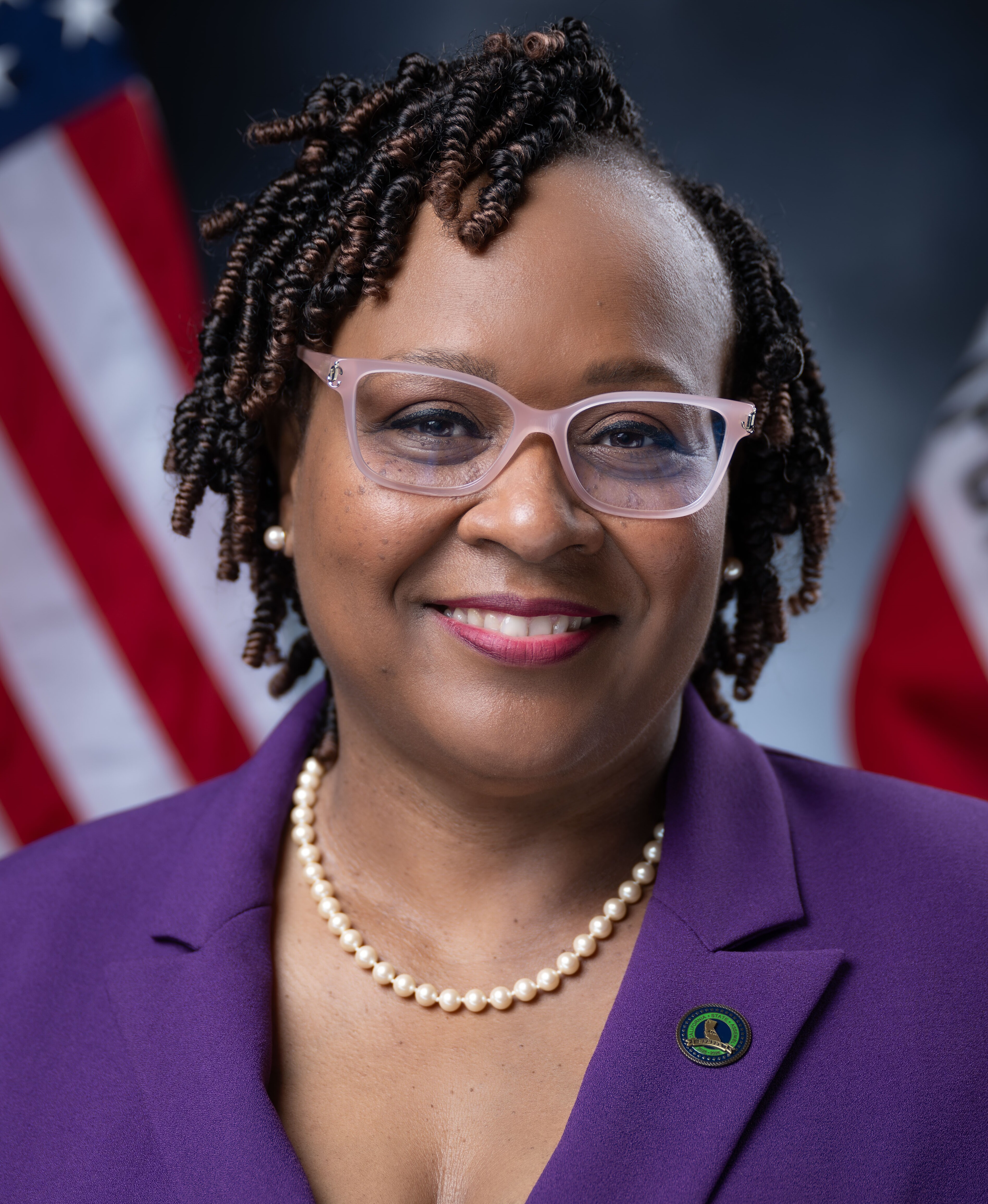

Candidate	Lori Wilson	Jenny Callison
Party	Democratic	No party preference
Popular vote	111,482	60,151
Percentage	64.9%	35.1%
State assemblymember before election
Lori Wilson
Democratic
State assemblymember after election
Lori Wilson
Democratic

Incumbent Democrat Lori Wilson was re-elected in 2024 with 58.8% of the vote. Wilson is seeking re-election to her third full term in office.

=== Candidates ===
==== Declared ====
- Jenny Callison (No party preference), U.S. Army veteran, runner-up for this district in 2022
- Rochelle Conner (No party preference)
- Lori Wilson (Democratic), incumbent state assemblymember

=== Endorsements ===
Lori Wilson (D)

Political parties

- California Democratic Party

=== Results ===
2026 California's 11th State Assembly district election
Primary election
Party	Candidate	Votes	%
Democratic	Lori Wilson (incumbent)	72,397	65.3
No party preference	Jenny Leilani Callison	26,106	23.6
No party preference	Rochelle Conner	12,334	11.1
Total votes		110,837	100.0
General election
Democratic	Lori Wilson (incumbent)	111,482	64.9
No party preference	Jenny Leilani Callison	60,151	35.1
Total votes		171,633	100.0
Democratic hold			

== District 12 ==
2026 California's 12th State Assembly district election
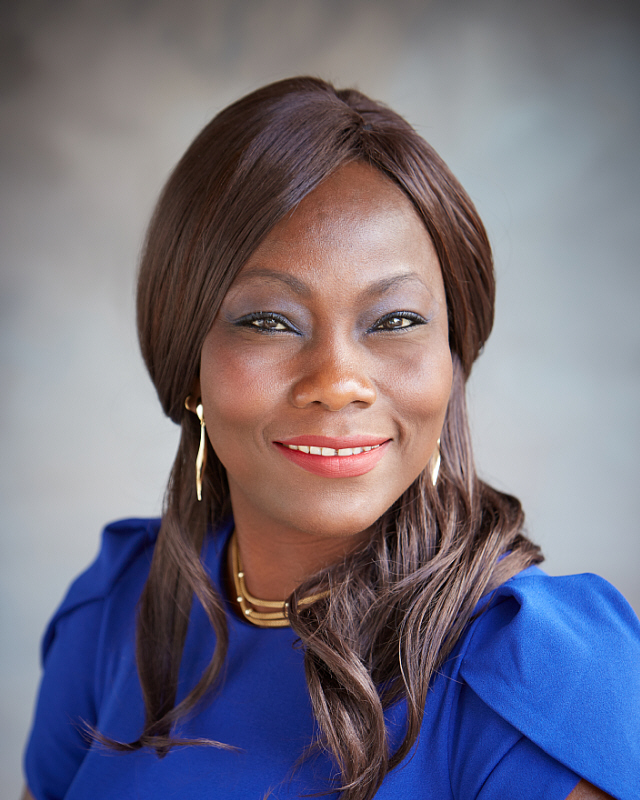

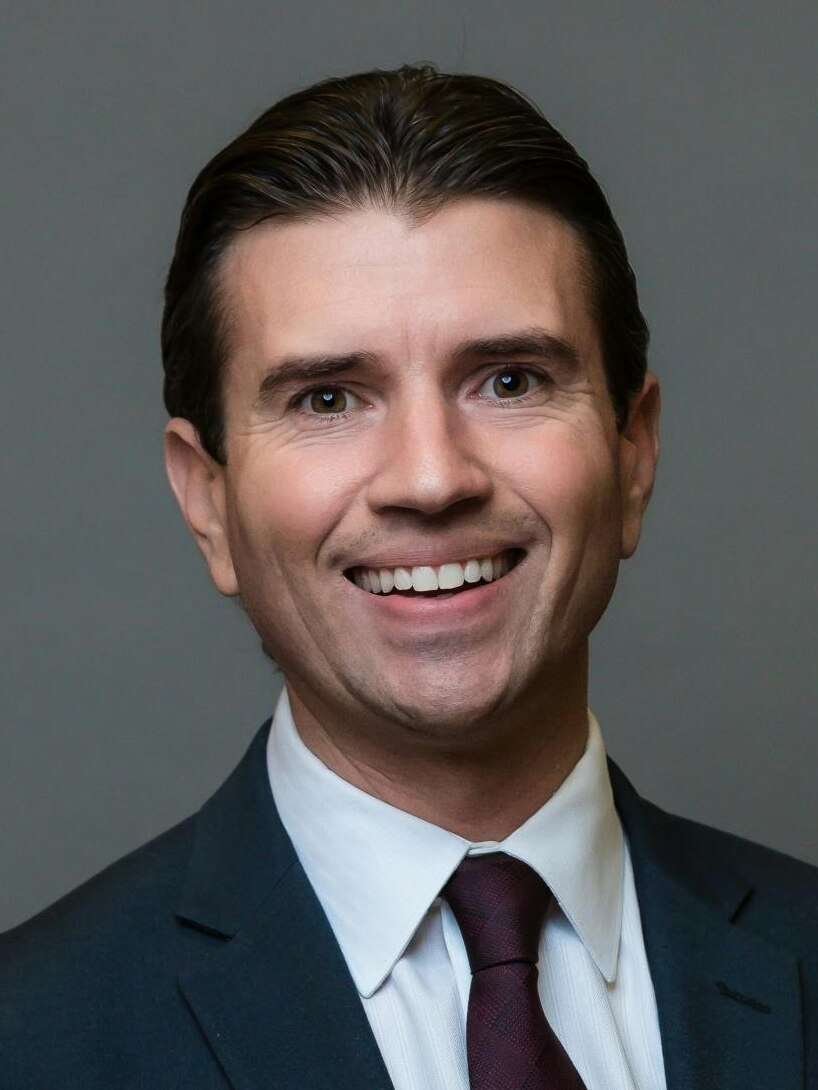
Candidate	Jackie Elward	Eric Lucan
Party	Democratic	Democratic
Popular vote	111,415	85,963
Percentage	56.5%	43.5%
State assemblymember before election
Damon Connolly
Democratic
State assemblymember after election
Jackie Elward
Democratic

Incumbent Democrat Damon Connolly was re-elected in 2024 with 75.7% of the vote. Connolly has declined to seek a third term in office, instead seeking to run for the state senate.

=== Candidates ===
==== Declared ====
- Eli Beckman (Democratic), Corte Madera city councilor (2018–present)
- Eryn Cervantes (Republican), candidate for this district in 2024
- Jackie Elward (Democratic), Rohnert Park city councilor and candidate for SD-03 in 2024
- Eric Lucan (Democratic), Marin County supervisor (2022–present)
- Steve Schwartz (Democratic), farmer and candidate for this district in 2022
- Holli Thier (Democratic), Tiburon city councilor

==== Declined ====
- Sara Aminzedeh (Democratic), deputy secretary of the California Natural Resources Agency and runner-up for this district in 2022 (endorsed Lucan)
- Damon Connolly (Democratic), incumbent state assemblymember (running for state senate)
- Andrew Podshadley (Republican), wine business owner and runner-up for this district in 2024

==== Endorsements ====
Eli Beckman (D)

Labor unions

- SEIU-UHW West (dual endorsement with Elward)

Organizations

- California Legislative LGBTQ Caucus
- Equality California (dual endorsement with Thier)

Newspapers

- Bay Area Reporter (primary only)
Eric Lucan (D)

U.S. representatives

- Jared Huffman, CA-02 (2013–present)

Organizations

- California YIMBY

Newspapers

- Marin Independent Journal
- The Press Democrat
Jackie Elward (D)

State legislators

- Damon Connolly, California State Assembly, District 12 (2022–present)

Labor unions

- California Teachers Association
- California Faculty Association
- Consumer Attorneys of California (dual endorsement with Thier)
- SEIU-UHW West (dual endorsement with Beckman)
- National Union of Healthcare Workers (dual endorsement with Thier)

Organizations

- California Working Families Party
- Center for Biological Diversity Action Fund
- Our Revolution

Newspapers

- Bay Area Reporter (general only)
Holli Thier (D)

Organizations

- Equality California (dual endorsement with Beckman)
- Consumer Attorneys of California (dual endorsement with Elward)
Declined to endorse

Political parties

- California Democratic Party

=== Results ===
2026 California's 12th State Assembly district election
Primary election
Party	Candidate	Votes	%
Democratic	Eric Lucan	45,350	28.3
Democratic	Jackie Elward	36,196	22.6
Republican	Eryn Cervantes	31,106	19.4
Democratic	Holli Thier	22,384	14.0
Democratic	Eli Beckman	14,336	8.9
Democratic	Steve Schwartz	10,964	6.8
Total votes		160,336	100.0
General election
Democratic	Jackie Elward	111,415	56.5
Democratic	Eric Lucan	85,963	43.5
Total votes		197,378	100.0
Democratic hold			

== District 13 ==
2026 California's 13th State Assembly district election
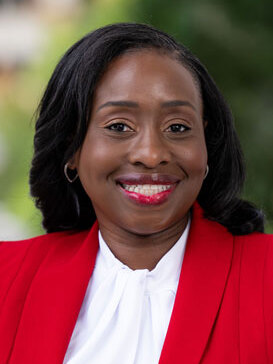

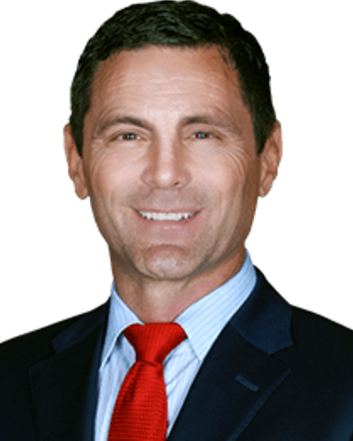
Candidate	Rhodesia Ransom	Tom Patti
Party	Democratic	Republican
Popular vote	79,506	39,076
Percentage	67.0%	33.0%
State assemblymember before election
Rhodesia Ransom
Democratic
State assemblymember after election
Rhodesia Ransom
Democratic

Incumbent Democrat Rhodesia Ransom was first elected in 2024 with 56.9% of the vote. Ransom is seeking re-election to her second term in office.

=== Candidates ===
==== Declared ====
- Eliza Dy (No party preference), business owner
- Ali Jafri (Republican), accountant and farmer
- Tom Patti (Republican), former San Joaquin County supervisor (2016–2024), runner-up for California's 9th congressional district in 2022, and runner-up for mayor of Stockton in 2024
- Rhodesia Ransom (Democratic), incumbent state assemblymember

=== Endorsements ===
Tom Patti (R)

Political parties

- California Republican Party
Rhodesia Ransom (D)

Political parties

- California Democratic Party

=== Results ===
2026 California's 13th State Assembly district election
Primary election
Party	Candidate	Votes	%
Democratic	Rhodesia Ransom (incumbent)	400,388	58.3
Republican	Tom Patti	24,282	35.3
Republican	Ali Jafri	2,849	4.1
No party preference	Eliza Dy	1,568	2.3
Total votes		68,787	100.0
General election
Democratic	Rhodesia Ransom (incumbent)	79,506	67.0
Republican	Tom Patti	39,076	33.0
Total votes		118,582	100.0
Democratic hold			

== District 14 ==
2026 California's 14th State Assembly district election
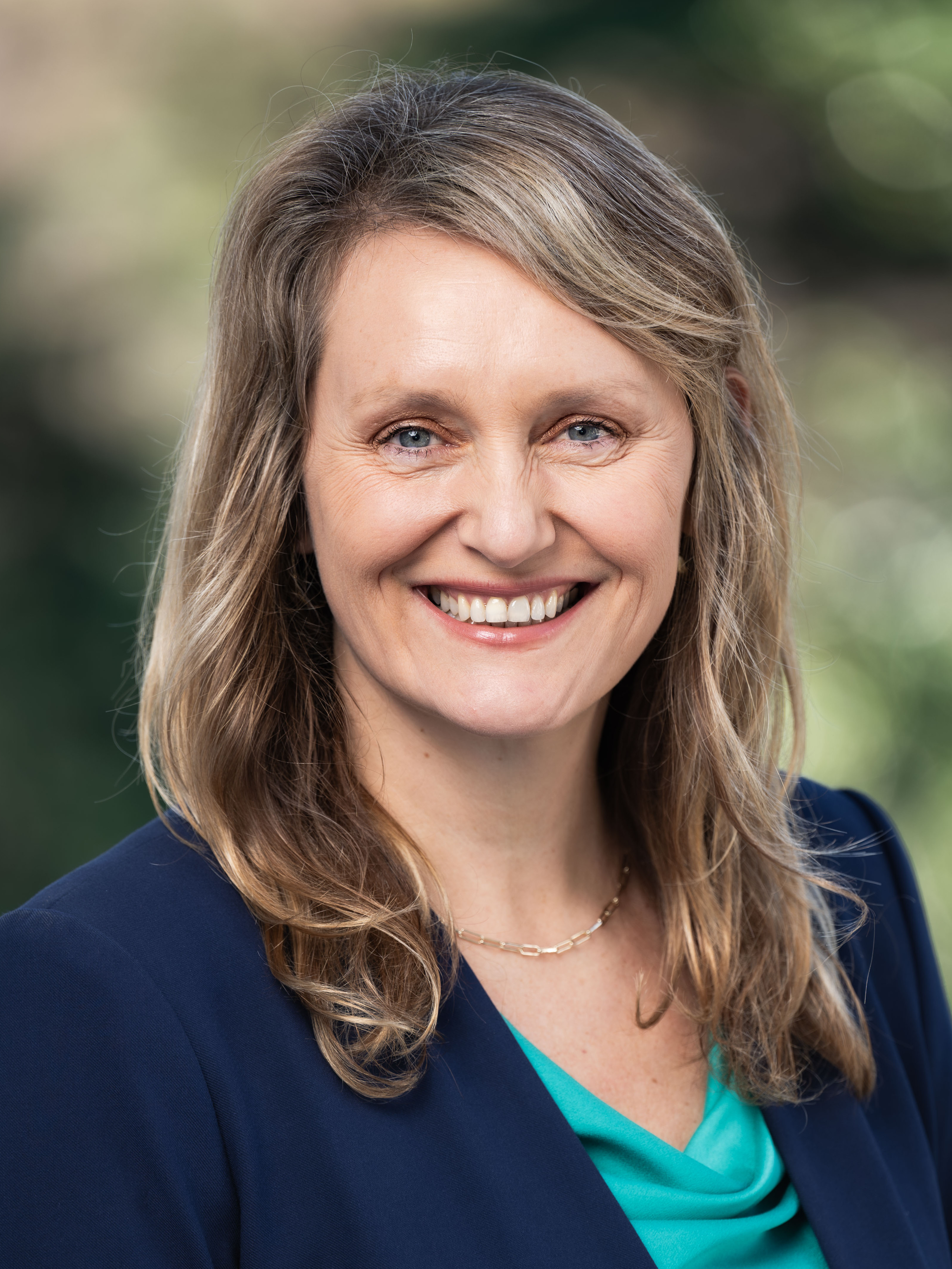

Candidate	Buffy Wicks	Mark Rendon
Party	Democratic	Green
Popular vote	137,255	38,049
Percentage	78.3%	21.7%
State assemblymember before election
Buffy Wicks
Democratic
State assemblymember after election
Buffy Wicks
Democratic

Incumbent Democrat Buffy Wicks was re-elected in 2024 with 68.5% of the vote. Wicks is seeking re-election to her fifth term in office.

=== Candidates ===
==== Declared ====
- Mark Rendon (Green), teacher
- Borgar Solnordal (Republican), Sunday school teacher
- Buffy Wicks (Democratic), incumbent state assemblymember

=== Endorsements ===
Mark Rendon (G)

Political parties

- Green Party of Alameda County
Buffy Wicks (D)

Political parties

- California Democratic Party

Newspapers

- Bay Area Reporter

=== Results ===
2026 California's 14th State Assembly district election
Primary election
Party	Candidate	Votes	%
Democratic	Buffy Wicks (incumbent)	105,311	81.2
Green	Mark Rendon	12,939	10.0
Republican	Borgar Solnordal	11,376	8.8
Total votes		129,626	100.0
General election
Democratic	Buffy Wicks (incumbent)	137,255	78.3
Green	Mark Rendon	38,049	21.7
Total votes		175,304	100.0
Democratic hold			

== District 15 ==
2026 California's 15th State Assembly district election
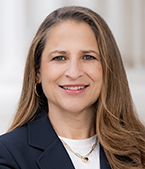

Candidate	Anamarie Avila Farias	Arthur Webb
Party	Democratic	No party preference
Popular vote	118,712	50,823
Percentage	70.0%	30.0%
State assemblymember before election
Anamarie Avila Farias
Democratic
State assemblymember after election
Anamarie Avila Farias
Democratic

Incumbent Democrat Anamarie Avila Farias was first elected in 2024 with 64.1% of the vote. Avila Farias is seeking re-election to her second term in office.

=== Candidates ===
==== Declared ====
- Anamarie Avila Farias (Democratic), incumbent state assemblymember
- Arthur Webb (No party preference), retired technology manager

=== Endorsements ===
Anamarie Avila Farias (D)

Political parties

- California Democratic Party

=== Results ===
2026 California's 15th State Assembly district election
Primary election
Party	Candidate	Votes	%
Democratic	Anamarie Avila Farias (incumbent)	78,693	69.6
No party preference	Arthur Webb	34,390	30.4
Total votes		113,083	100.0
General election
Democratic	Anamarie Avila Farias (incumbent)	118,712	70.0
No party preference	Arthur Webb	50,823	30.0
Total votes		169,535	100.0
Democratic hold			

== District 16 ==
2026 California's 16th State Assembly district election
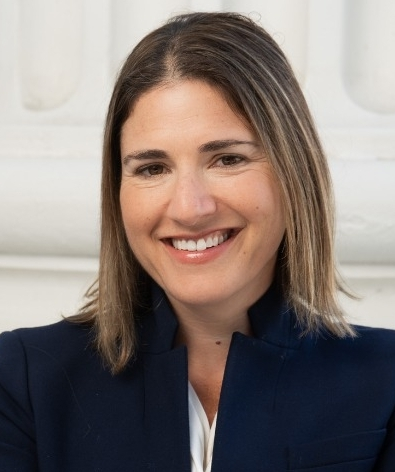

Candidate	Rebecca Bauer-Kahan	Joseph Rubay
Party	Democratic	Republican
Popular vote	149,606	67,053
Percentage	69.1%	30.9%
State assemblymember before election
Rebecca Bauer-Kahan
Democratic
State assemblymember after election
Rebecca Bauer-Kahan
Democratic

Incumbent Democrat Rebecca Bauer-Kahan was re-elected in 2024 with 64.1% of the vote. Bauer-Kahan is seeking re-election to her fifth term in office.

=== Candidates ===
==== Declared ====
- Rebecca Bauer-Kahan (Democratic), incumbent state assemblymember
- Chirag Kathrani (No party preference), candidate for mayor of San Ramon in 2024
- Joseph A. Rubay (Republican), businessman, perennial candidate

=== Endorsements ===
Rebecca Bauer-Kahan (D)

Political parties

- California Democratic Party

Newspapers

- Bay Area Reporter
- The Independent

=== Results ===
2026 California's 16th State Assembly district election
Primary election
Party	Candidate	Votes	%
Democratic	Rebecca Bauer-Kahan (incumbent)	101,017	65.6
Republican	Joseph Rubay	47,142	30.6
No party preference	Chirag Kathrani	5,791	3.8
Total votes		153,950	100.0
General election
Democratic	Rebecca Bauer-Kahan (incumbent)	149,606	69.1
Republican	Joseph Rubay	67,053	30.9
Total votes		216,659	100.0
Democratic hold			

== District 17 ==
2026 California's 17th State Assembly district election
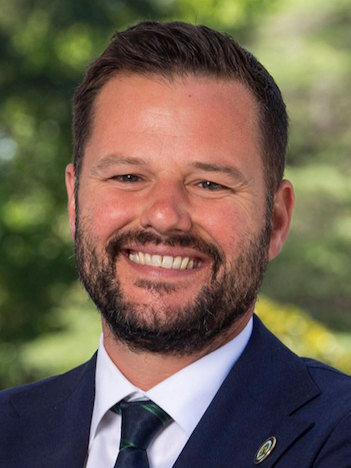

Candidate	Matt Haney	Manuel Noris-Barrera
Party	Democratic	Republican
Popular vote	160,135	17,484
Percentage	90.2%	9.8%
State assemblymember before election
Matt Haney
Democratic
State assemblymember after election
Matt Haney
Democratic

Incumbent Democrat Matt Haney was re-elected in 2024 with 84.6% of the vote. Haney is seeking re-election and is running for his third full term in office.

=== Candidates ===
==== Declared ====
- Matt Haney (Democratic), incumbent state assemblymember
- Manuel Noris-Barrera (Republican), realtor and runner-up for this district in 2024 (write-in)
- Starchild (Libertarian) (write-in)
- Bradley Wiedmaier (Peace and Freedom) (write-in)

=== Endorsements ===
Matt Haney (D)

Political parties

- California Democratic Party

Newspapers

- Bay Area Reporter
- San Francisco Examiner

=== Results ===
2026 California's 17th State Assembly district election
Primary election
Party	Candidate	Votes	%
Democratic	Matt Haney (incumbent)	106,260	99.4
Republican	Manuel Noris-Barrera (write-in)	468	0.4
Peace and Freedom	Bradley Wiedmaier (write-in)	127	0.1
Libertarian	Starchild (write-in)	17	0.0
Total votes		106,872	100.0
General election
Democratic	Matt Haney (incumbent)	160,135	90.2
Republican	Manuel Noris-Barrera	17,484	9.8
Total votes		177,619	100.0
Democratic hold			

== District 18 ==
2026 California's 18th State Assembly district election
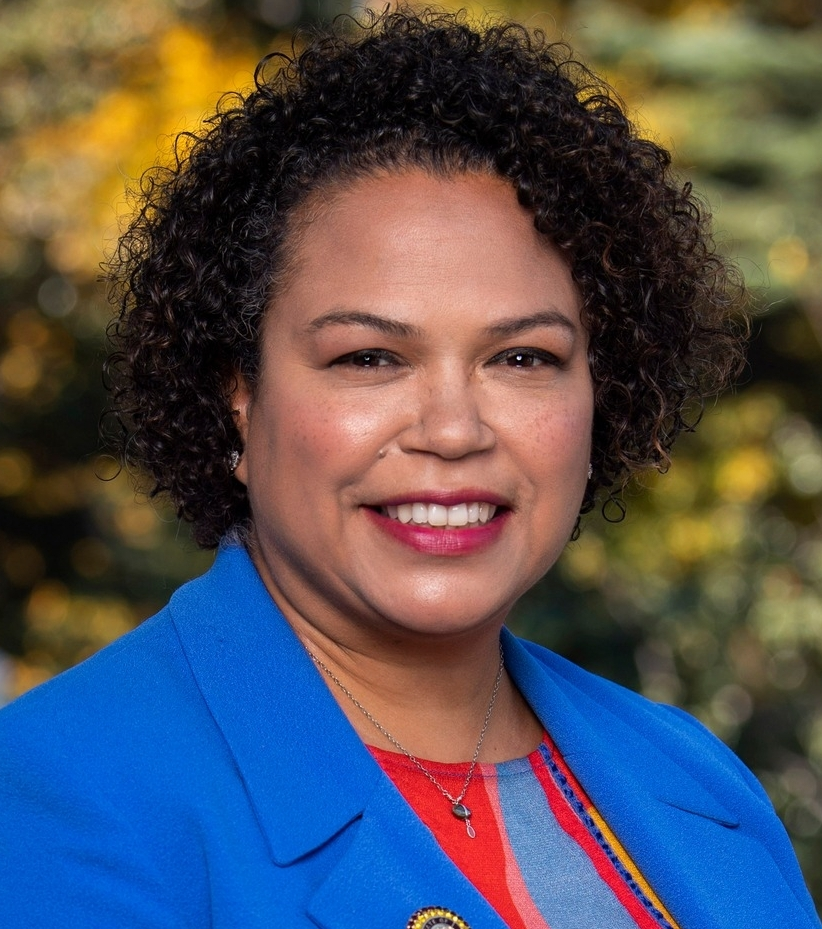

Candidate	Mia Bonta	Andre Sandford
Party	Democratic	Democratic
Popular vote	117,883	31,610
Percentage	78.9%	21.1%
State assemblymember before election
Mia Bonta
Democratic
State assemblymember after election
Mia Bonta
Democratic

Incumbent Democrat Mia Bonta was re-elected in 2024 with 80.3% of the vote. Bonta is seeking re-election to her third full term in office.

=== Candidates ===
==== Declared ====
- Mia Bonta (Democratic), incumbent state assemblymember
- Michael Goldstein (Green), author
- Ned Nuerge (Republican), retired driving instructor
- Andre Sandford (Democratic), housing program director and American Independent runner-up for this district in 2024

=== Endorsements ===
Mia Bonta (D)

Political parties

- California Democratic Party
- California Working Families Party

Newspapers

- Bay Area Reporter

=== Results ===
2026 California's 18th State Assembly district election
Primary election
Party	Candidate	Votes	%
Democratic	Mia Bonta (incumbent)	84,226	76.9
Democratic	Andre Sandford	11,918	10.9
Republican	Ned Nuerge	7,864	7.2
Green	Michael Goldstein	5,525	5.0
Total votes		109,533	100.0
General election
Democratic	Mia Bonta (incumbent)	117,883	78.9
Democratic	Andre Sandford	31,610	21.1
Total votes		149,493	100.0
Democratic hold			

== District 19 ==
2026 California's 19th State Assembly district election
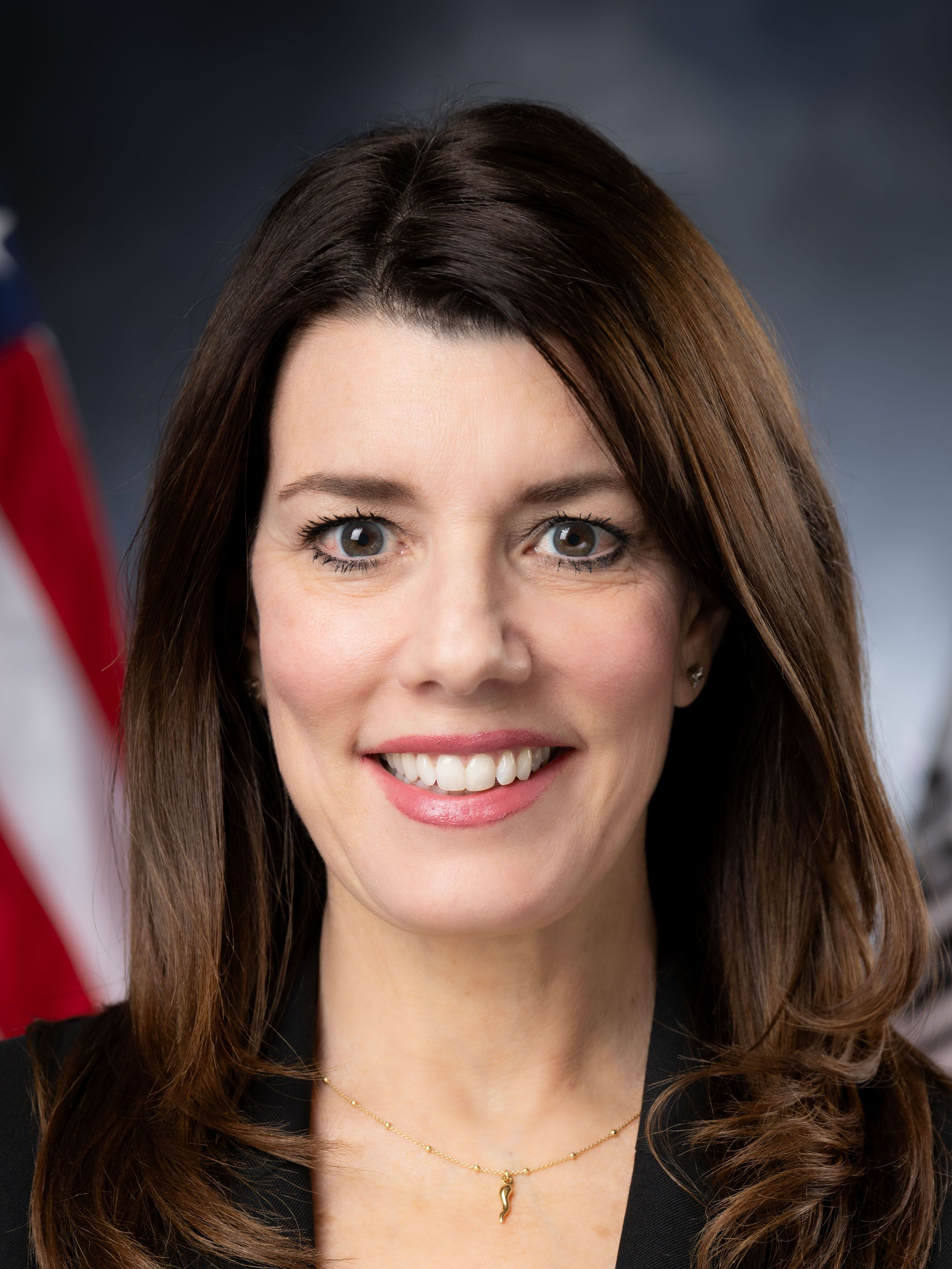

Candidate	Catherine Stefani	Philip Wing
Party	Democratic	Republican
Popular vote	154,242	30,259
Percentage	83.6%	16.4%
State assemblymember before election
Catherine Stefani
Democratic
State assemblymember after election
Catherine Stefani
Democratic

Incumbent Democrat Catherine Stefani was first elected in 2024 with 60.5% of the vote. Stefani is seeking re-election to her second term in office.

=== Candidates ===
==== Declared ====
- Catherine Stefani (Democratic), incumbent state assemblymember
- Philip Louis Wing (Republican), retired financial advisor

=== Endorsements ===
Catherine Stefani (D)

Political parties

- California Democratic Party

Newspapers

- Bay Area Reporter
- San Francisco Examiner

=== Results ===
2026 California's 19th State Assembly district election
Primary election
Party	Candidate	Votes	%
Democratic	Catherine Stefani (incumbent)	108,403	83.0
Republican	Philip Wing	22,149	17.0
Total votes		130,552	100.0
General election
Democratic	Catherine Stefani (incumbent)	154,242	83.6
Republican	Philip Wing	30,259	16.4
Total votes		184,501	100.0
Democratic hold			

== District 20 ==
2026 California's 20th State Assembly district election
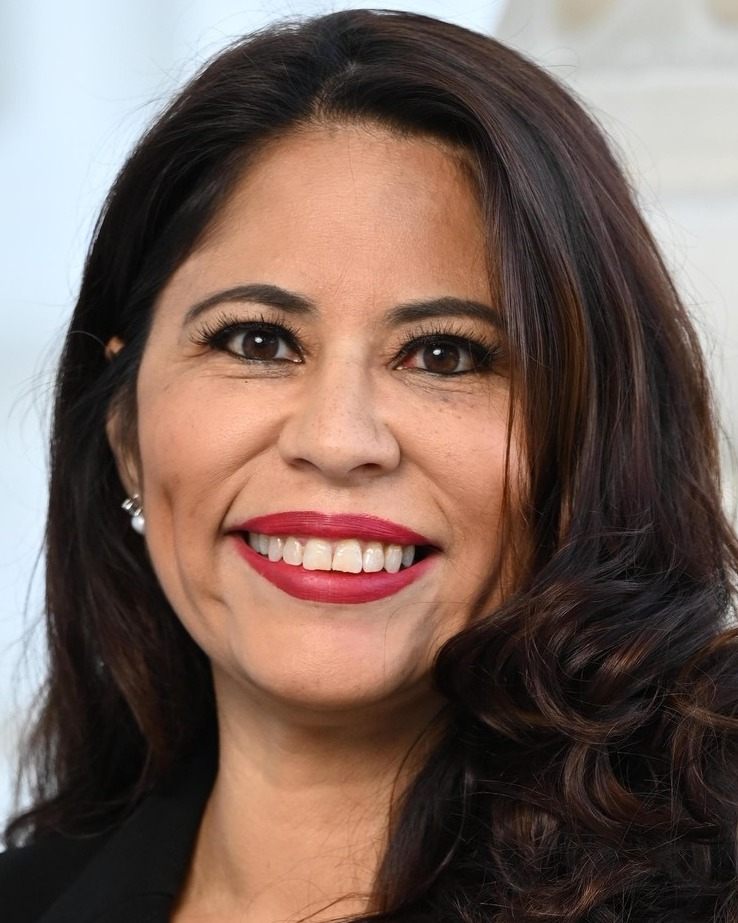

Candidate	Liz Ortega	Patricia Muga
Party	Democratic	Republican
Popular vote	115,562	33,687
Percentage	77.4%	22.6%
State assemblymember before election
Liz Ortega
Democratic
State assemblymember after election
Liz Ortega
Democratic

Incumbent Democrat Liz Ortega was re-elected in 2024 with 72.9% of the vote. Ortega is seeking re-election to her third term in office.

=== Candidates ===
==== Declared ====
- Patricia Muga (Republican), real estate appraiser
- Liz Ortega (Democratic), incumbent state assemblymember

=== Endorsements ===
Liz Ortega (D)

Organizations

- Our Revolution

Political parties

- California Democratic Party
- California Working Families Party

Newspapers

- Bay Area Reporter

=== Results ===
2026 California's 20th State Assembly district election
Primary election
Party	Candidate	Votes	%
Democratic	Liz Ortega (incumbent)	76,306	75.1
Republican	Patricia Muga	25,262	24.9
Total votes		101,568	100.0
General election
Democratic	Liz Ortega (incumbent)	115,562	77.4
Republican	Patricia Muga	33,687	22.6
Total votes		149,249	100.0
Democratic hold			

== District 21 ==
2026 California's 21st State Assembly district election
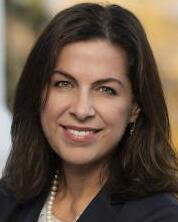

Candidate	Diane Papan	Jabra Muhawieh
Party	Democratic	Republican
Popular vote	137,066	34,648
Percentage	79.8%	20.2%
State assemblymember before election
Diane Papan
Democratic
State assemblymember after election
Diane Papan
Democratic

Incumbent Democrat Diane Papan was re-elected in 2024 with 73.8% of the vote. Papan is seeking re-election to her third term in office.

=== Candidates ===
==== Declared ====
- Jabra Muhawieh (Republican), businessman
- Diane Papan (Democratic), incumbent state assemblymember

=== Endorsements ===
Diane Papan (D)

Political parties

- California Democratic Party

Newspapers

- Bay Area Reporter
- San Mateo Daily Journal

=== Results ===
2026 California's 21st State Assembly district election
Primary election
Party	Candidate	Votes	%
Democratic	Diane Papan (incumbent)	91,401	78.7
Republican	Jabra Muhawieh	24,681	21.3
Total votes		116,082	100.0
General election
Democratic	Diane Papan (incumbent)	137,066	79.8
Republican	Jabra Muhawieh	34,648	20.2
Total votes		171,714	100.0
Democratic hold			

== District 22 ==
2026 California's 22nd State Assembly district election
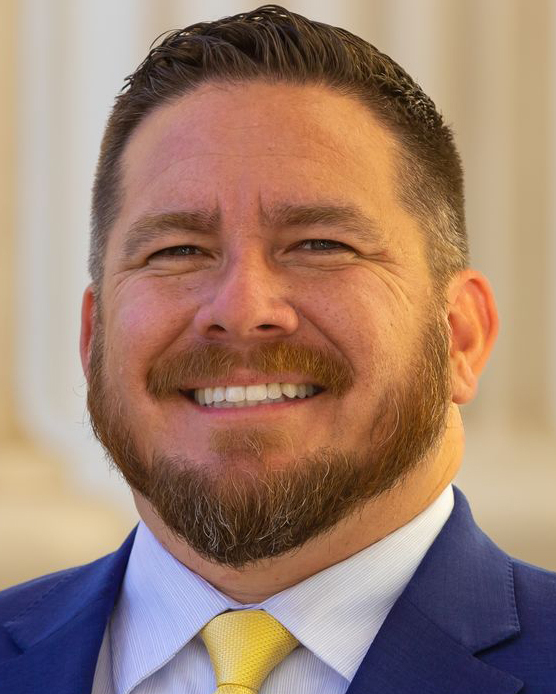
Candidate	Juan Alanis
Party	Republican
Popular vote	81,702
Percentage	100.0%
State assemblymember before election
Juan Alanis
Republican
State assemblymember after election
Juan Alanis
Republican

Incumbent Republican Juan Alanis was re-elected in 2024 with 56.2% of the vote. Alanis is seeking re-election and is running unopposed for his third term in office.

=== Candidates ===
==== Declared ====
- Juan Alanis (Republican), incumbent state assemblymember

==== Endorsements ====
Juan Alanis (R)

Political parties

- California Republican Party

=== Results ===
2026 California's 22nd State Assembly district election
Primary election
Party	Candidate	Votes	%
Republican	Juan Alanis (incumbent)	51,246	100.0
Total votes		51,246	100.0
General election
Republican	Juan Alanis (incumbent)	81,702	100.0
Total votes		81,702	100.0
Republican hold			

== District 23 ==
2026 California's 23rd State Assembly district election
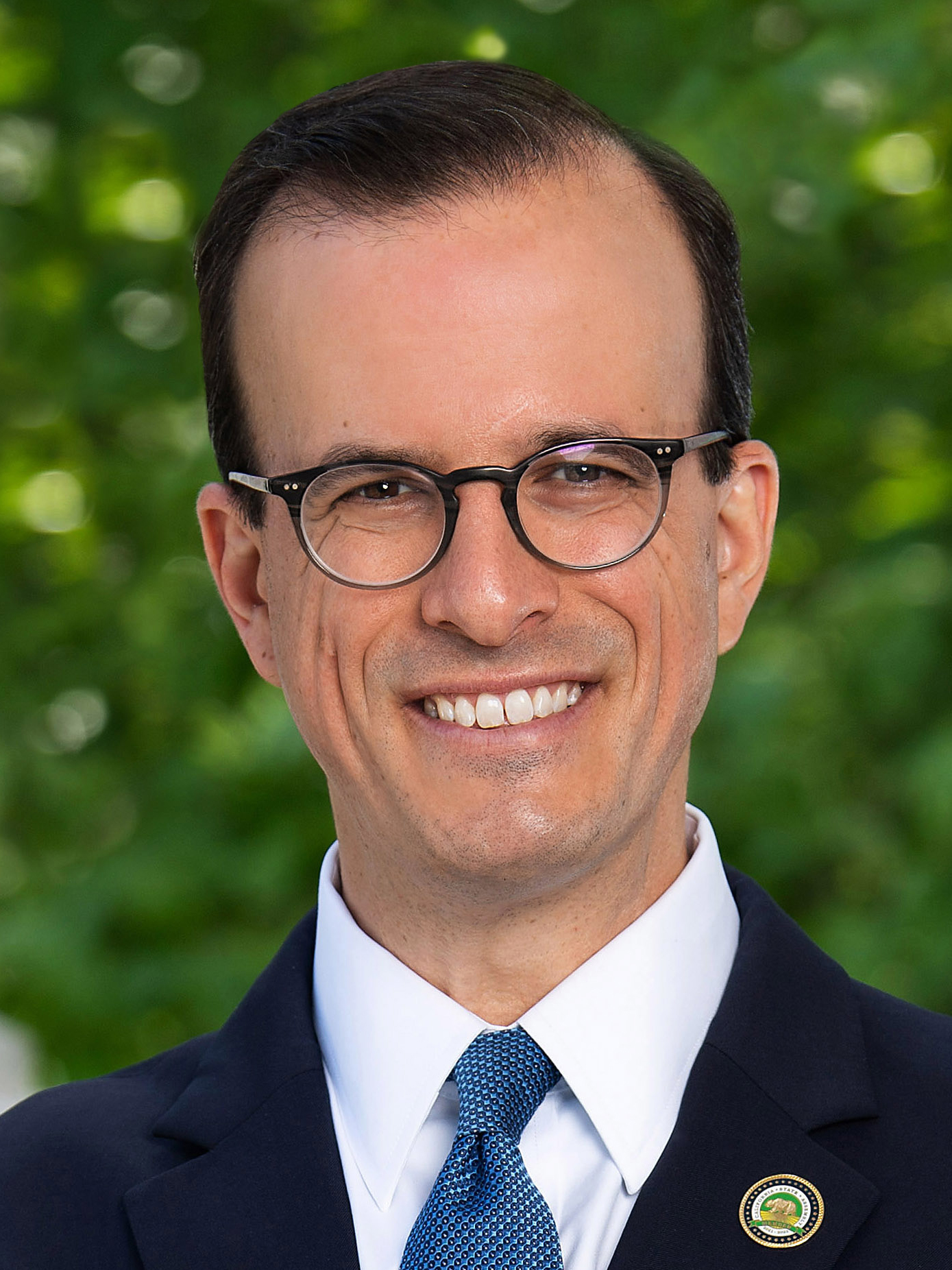

Candidate	Marc Berman	David Johnson
Party	Democratic	Republican
Popular vote	142,822	43,224
Percentage	76.8%	23.2%
State assemblymember before election
Marc Berman
Democratic
State assemblymember after election
Marc Berman
Democratic

Incumbent Democrat Marc Berman was re-elected in 2024 with 59.8% of the vote. Berman is seeking re-election to his sixth and final term in office.

=== Candidates ===
==== Declared ====
- Marc Berman (Democratic), incumbent state assemblymember
- Rick Giorgetti (Republican), business advisor
- David G. Johnson (Republican), chairman of the Santa Clara County Republican Party

=== Endorsements ===
Marc Berman (D)

Political parties

- California Democratic Party

Newspapers

- San Mateo Daily Journal

=== Results ===
2026 California's 23rd State Assembly district election
Primary election
Party	Candidate	Votes	%
Democratic	Marc Berman (incumbent)	96,074	77.3
Republican	David Johnson	18,170	14.6
Republican	Rick Giorgetti	10,001	8.0
Total votes		124,245	100.0
General election
Democratic	Marc Berman (incumbent)	142,822	76.8
Republican	David Johnson	43,224	23.2
Total votes		186,046	100.0
Democratic hold			

== District 24 ==
2026 California's 24th State Assembly district election
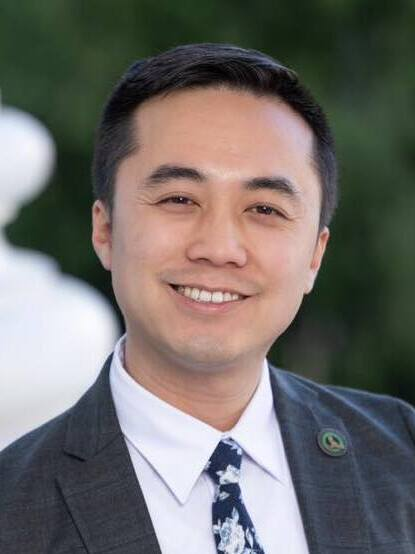

Candidate	Alex Lee	Max Hsia
Party	Democratic	Republican
Popular vote	94,483	36,837
Percentage	72.0%	28.0%
State assemblymember before election
Alex Lee
Democratic
State assemblymember after election
Alex Lee
Democratic

Incumbent Democrat Alex Lee was re-elected in 2024 with 66.1% of the vote. Lee is seeking re-election to his fourth term in office.

=== Candidates ===
==== Declared ====
- Max Hsia (Republican), conservative activist
- Alex Lee (Democratic), incumbent state assemblymember
- Yang Shao (No party preference), Fremont city councilor

=== Endorsements ===
Max Hsia (R)

Political parties

- California Republican Party
Alex Lee (D)

Organizations

- Center for Biological Diversity Action Fund
- Our Revolution

Political parties

- California Democratic Party
- California Working Families Party

Newspapers

- Bay Area Reporter
- The Independent

=== Results ===
2026 California's 24th State Assembly district election
Primary election
Party	Candidate	Votes	%
Democratic	Alex Lee (incumbent)	55,856	65.4
Republican	Max Hsia	21,339	25.0
No party preference	Yang Shao	8,233	9.6
Total votes		85,428	100.0
General election
Democratic	Alex Lee (incumbent)	94,483	72.0
Republican	Max Hsia	36,837	28.0
Total votes		131,320	100.0
Democratic hold			

== District 25 ==
2026 California's 25th State Assembly district election
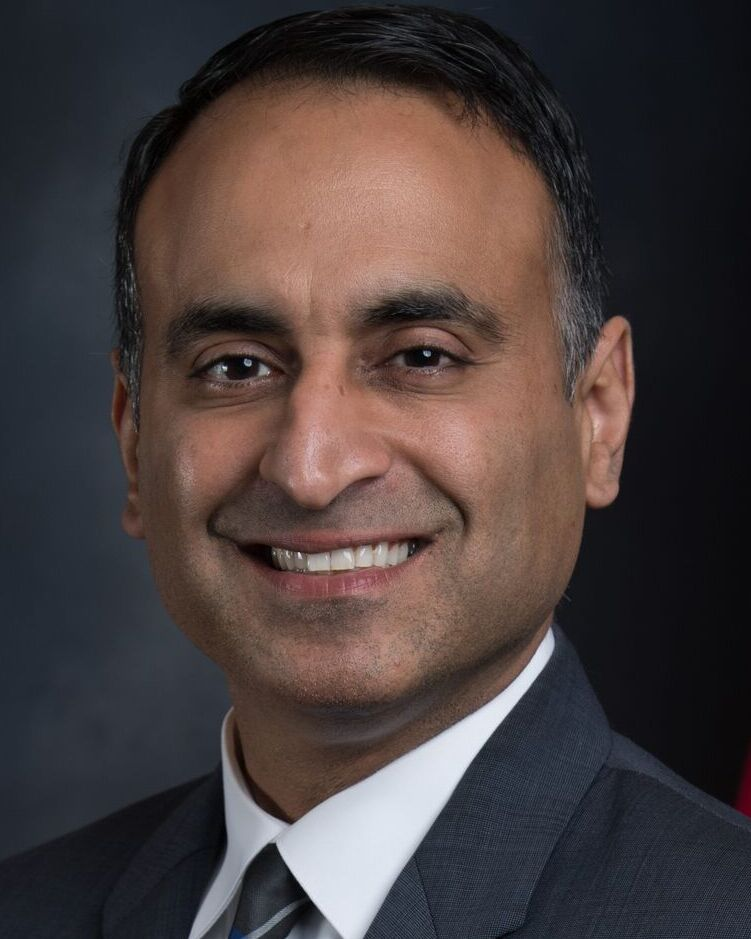

Candidate	Ash Kalra	Himat Singh Bainiwal
Party	Democratic	Republican
Popular vote	100,596	33,227
Percentage	75.2%	24.8%
State assemblymember before election
Ash Kalra
Democratic
State assemblymember after election
Ash Kalra
Democratic

Incumbent Democrat Ash Kalra was re-elected in 2024 with 68.4% of the vote. Kalra is seeking re-election to his sixth and final term in office.

=== Candidates ===
==== Declared ====
- Himat Singh Bainiwal (Republican), attorney
- Ash Kalra (Democratic), incumbent state assemblymember

=== Endorsements ===
Himat Singh Bainwal (R)

Political parties

- California Republican Party
Ash Kalra (D)

Organizations

- Center for Biological Diversity Action Fund
- Our Revolution

Political parties

- California Democratic Party
- California Working Families Party

Newspapers

- Bay Area Reporter

=== Results ===
2026 California's 25th State Assembly district election
Primary election
Party	Candidate	Votes	%
Democratic	Ash Kalra (incumbent)	56,052	72.2
Republican	Himat Singh Bainiwal	21,609	27.8
Total votes		77,661	100.0
General election
Democratic	Ash Kalra (incumbent)	100,596	75.2
Republican	Himat Singh Bainiwal	33,227	24.8
Total votes		133,823	100.0
Democratic hold			

== District 26 ==
2026 California's 26th State Assembly district election
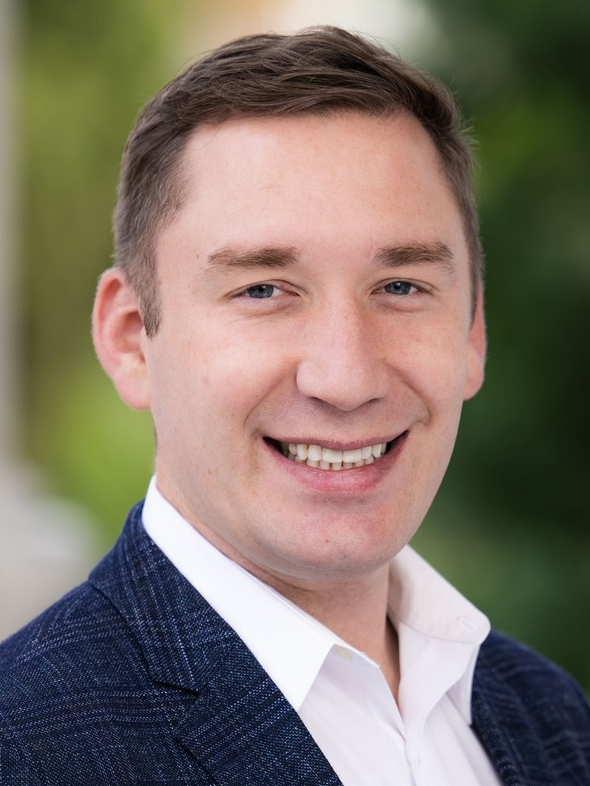

Candidate	Patrick Ahrens	Tim Gorsulowsky
Party	Democratic	Republican
Popular vote	98,067	29,507
Percentage	76.9%	23.1%
State assemblymember before election
Patrick Ahrens
Democratic
State assemblymember after election
Patrick Ahrens
Democratic

Incumbent Democrat Patrick Ahrens was first elected in 2024 with 56.0% of the vote. Ahrens is seeking re-election to his second term in office.

=== Candidates ===
==== Declared ====
- Patrick Ahrens (Democratic), incumbent state assemblymember
- Tim Gorsulowsky (Republican), small business owner

=== Endorsements ===
Patrick Ahrens (D)

Labor unions

- AFL-CIO South Bay Labor Council
- Association of California State Supervisors
- California Federation of Teachers
- California Labor Federation
- California Nurses Association
- California School Employees Association
- IBEW Local 332
- IFPTE Local 21
- National Union of Healthcare Workers
- SEIU California and Local 521
- SEIU UHW
- Teamsters Joint Council 7
- UAW Region 6 CA
- United Food and Commercial Workers Western States Council

Organizations

- California Environmental Voters
- California College Democrats
- California YIMBY
- Equality California
- Planned Parenthood Advocates Mar Monte

Political parties

- California Democratic Party

Newspapers

- Bay Area Reporter
Tim Gorsulowsky (R)

Political parties

- California Republican Party

=== Results ===
2026 California's 26th State Assembly district election
Primary election
Party	Candidate	Votes	%
Democratic	Patrick Ahrens (incumbent)	60,368	75.4
Republican	Tim Gorsulowsky	19,664	24.6
Total votes		80,032	100.0
General election
Democratic	Patrick Ahrens (incumbent)	98,067	76.9
Republican	Tim Gorsulowsky	29,507	23.1
Total votes		127,574	100.0
Democratic hold			

== District 27 ==
2026 California's 27th State Assembly district election
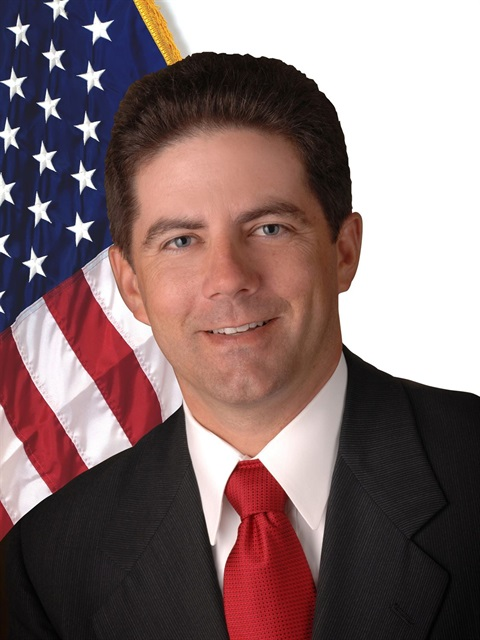

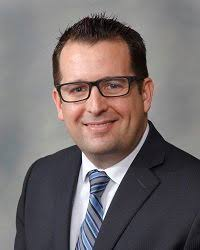
Candidate	Brian Pacheco	Mike Murphy
Party	Democratic	Republican
Popular vote	81,108	44,049
Percentage	64.8%	35.2%
State assemblymember before election
Esmeralda Soria
Democratic
State assemblymember after election
Brian Pacheco
Democratic

Incumbent Democrat Esmeralda Soria was re-elected in 2024 with 53.9% of the vote. Soria has declined to seek a third term in office, instead seeking to run for the state senate.

=== Candidates ===
==== Declared ====
- Mike Murphy (Republican), former mayor of Merced (2011–2020)
- Brian Pacheco (Democratic), Fresno County supervisor (2014–present)
- Japjeet Singh Uppal (Democratic), Livingston city councilor (2024–present)

==== Withdrawn ====
- Priya Lakireddy (Democratic), Merced City School Board president
- Leticia Gonzalez (Democratic), Madera County supervisor (2020–present)

==== Declined ====
- Esmeralda Soria (Democratic), incumbent state assemblymember (running for state senate)

=== Endorsements ===
Brian Pacheco (D)

U.S. representatives

- Jim Costa, CA-21 (2005–present)
- Adam Gray, CA-13 (2025–present)

State legislators

- Robert Rivas, state assembly speaker (2023–present) from the 29th district (2018–present)
- Esmeralda Soria, incumbent assemblymember from the 27th district (2022–present)

County officials

- Lisa Smittcamp, Fresno County district attorney (2015–present) (Republican)
- Margaret Mims, former Fresno County sheriff (2007–2023) (Republican)

Political parties

- California Democratic Party
Leticia Gonzalez (D) (withdrawn)

U.S. representatives

- ~~Adam Gray, CA-13 (2025–present)~~(switched endorsement to Pacheco after Gonzalez withdrew)

State legislators

- Anna Caballero, state senator from the 14th district (2018–present)
- ~~Robert Rivas, state assembly speaker (2023–present) from the 29th district (2018–present)~~ (switched endorsement to Pacheco after Gonzalez withdrew)
- ~~Esmeralda Soria, incumbent assemblymember from the 27th district (2022–present)~~ (switched endorsement to Pacheco after Gonzalez withdrew)

=== Results ===
2026 California's 27th State Assembly district election
Primary election
Party	Candidate	Votes	%
Republican	Mike Murphy	31,802	43.4
Democratic	Brian Pacheco	29,581	40.3
Democratic	Japjeet Singh Uppal	11,962	16.3
Total votes		73,345	100.0
General election
Democratic	Brian Pacheco	81,108	64.8
Republican	Mike Murphy	44,049	35.2
Total votes		125,157	100.0
Democratic hold			

== District 28 ==
2026 California's 28th State Assembly district election
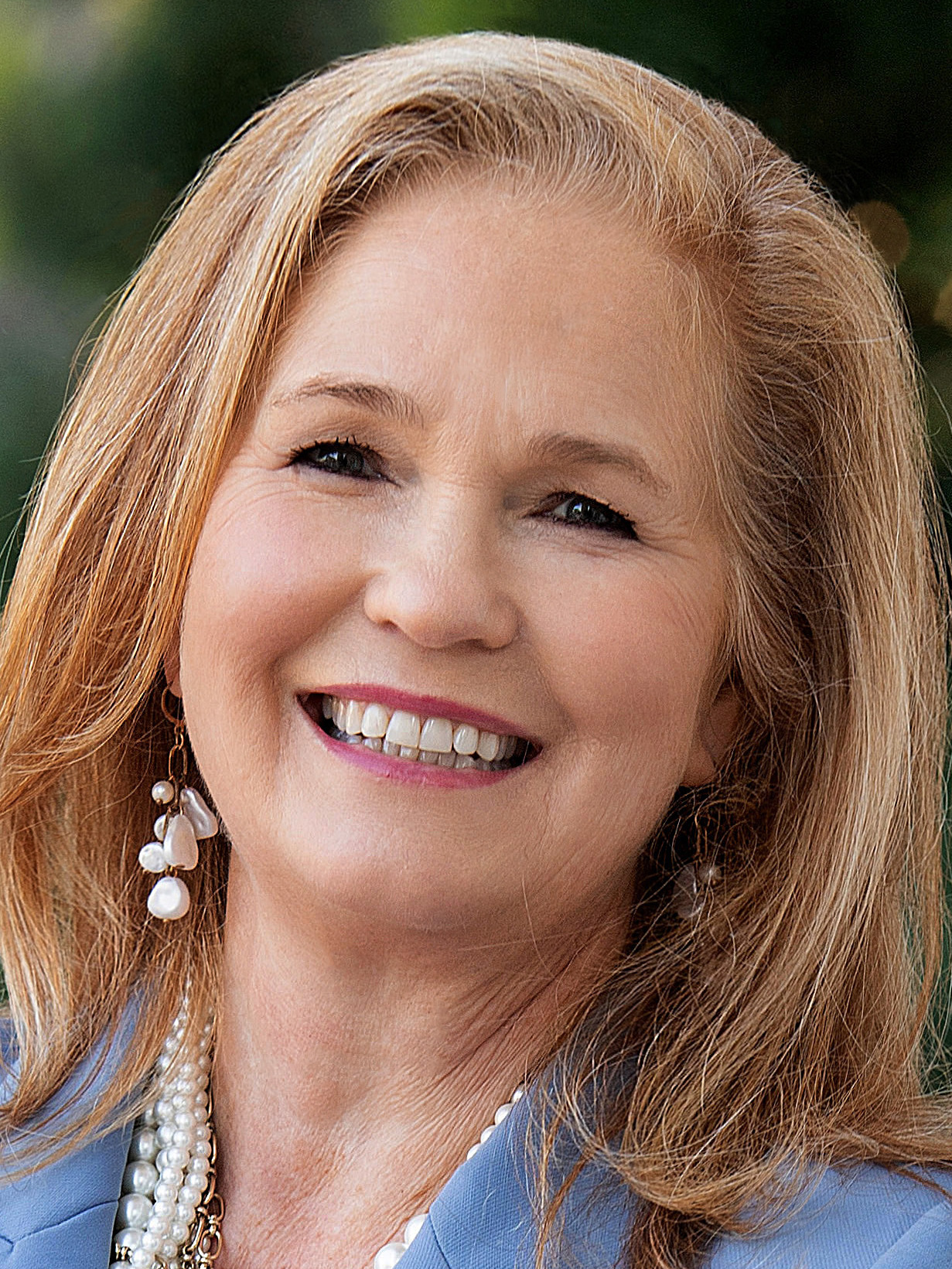

Candidate	Gail Pellerin	Carol Pefley
Party	Democratic	Republican
Popular vote	141,513	54,188
Percentage	72.3%	27.7%
State assemblymember before election
Gail Pellerin
Democratic
State assemblymember after election
Gail Pellerin
Democratic

Incumbent Democrat Gail Pellerin was re-elected in 2024 with 66.9% of the vote. Pellerin is seeking re-election to her third term in office.

=== Candidates ===
==== Declared ====
- Carol Pefley (Republican), realtor
- Gail Pellerin (Democratic), incumbent state assemblymember

=== Endorsements ===
Carol Pefley (R)

Political parties

- California Republican Party
Gail Pellerin (D)

Organizations

- Center for Biological Diversity Action Fund

Political parties

- California Democratic Party

Newspapers

- Santa Cruz Sentinel

=== Results ===
2026 California's 28th State Assembly district election
Primary election
Party	Candidate	Votes	%
Democratic	Gail Pellerin (incumbent)	94,902	72.0
Republican	Carol Pefley	36,949	28.0
Total votes		131,851	100.0
General election
Democratic	Gail Pellerin (incumbent)	141,513	72.3
Republican	Carol Pefley	54,188	27.7
Total votes		195,701	100.0
Democratic hold			

== District 29 ==
2026 California's 29th State Assembly district election
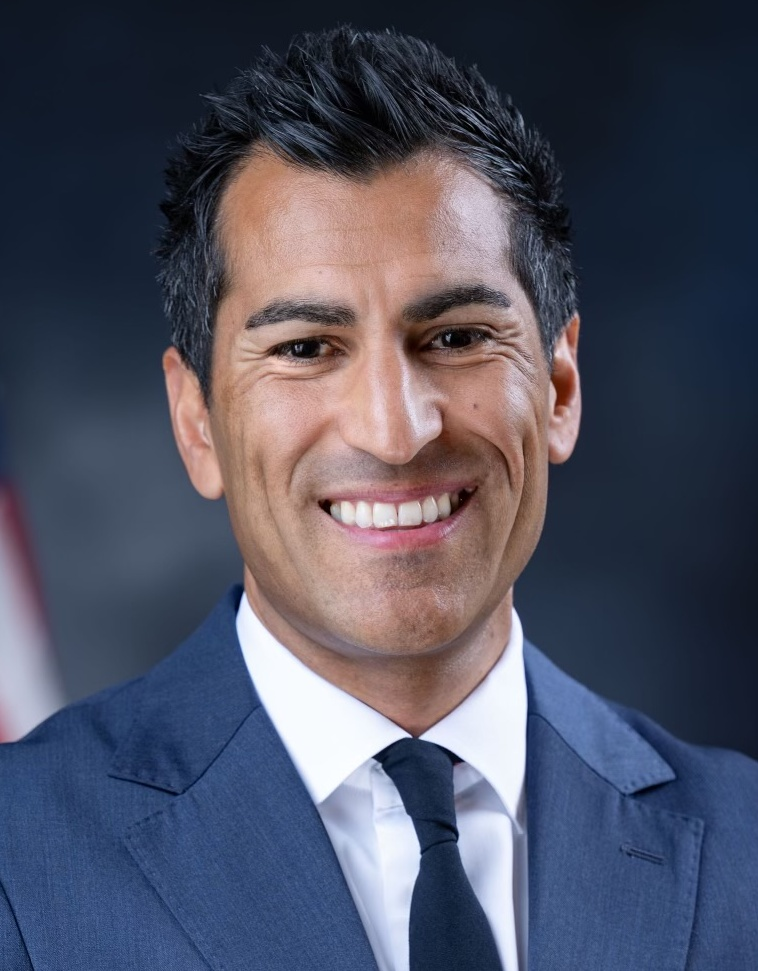

Candidate	Robert Rivas	Dennis Sanchez
Party	Democratic	Republican
Popular vote	94,628	36,782
Percentage	72.0%	28.0%
State assemblymember before election
Robert Rivas
Democratic
State assemblymember after election
Robert Rivas
Democratic

Incumbent Democrat and Speaker of the Assembly Robert Rivas was re-elected in 2024 with 66.0% of the vote. Rivas is seeking re-election to his fifth term in office.

=== Candidates ===
==== Declared ====
- J.W. Paine (Republican), truck driver and runner-up for this district in 2024
- Robert Rivas (Democratic), incumbent state assemblymember
- Dennis P. Sanchez (Republican), small business owner

=== Endorsements ===
Robert Rivas (D)

Political parties

- California Democratic Party

=== Results ===
2026 California's 29th State Assembly district election
Primary election
Party	Candidate	Votes	%
Democratic	Robert Rivas (incumbent)	53,157	66.5
Republican	Dennis Sanchez	14,444	18.1
Republican	J.W. Paine	12,369	15.5
Total votes		79,970	100.0
General election
Democratic	Robert Rivas (incumbent)	94,628	72.0
Republican	Dennis Sanchez	36,782	28.0
Total votes		131,410	100.0
Democratic hold			

== District 30 ==
2026 California's 30th State Assembly district election
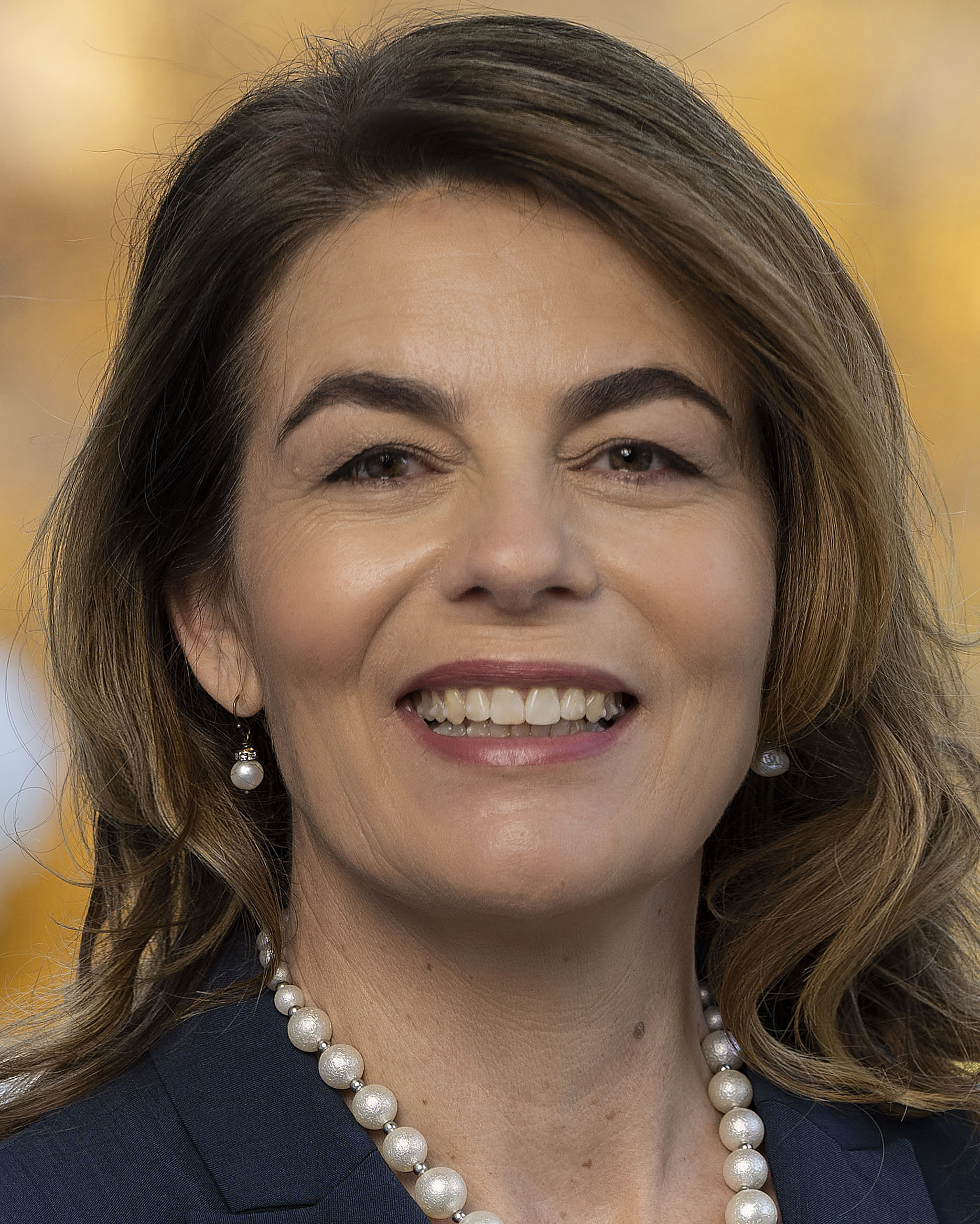

Candidate	Dawn Addis	Shannon Kessler
Party	Democratic	Republican
Popular vote	135,501	72,024
Percentage	65.3%	34.7%
State assemblymember before election
Dawn Addis
Democratic
State assemblymember after election
Dawn Addis
Democratic

Incumbent Democrat Dawn Addis was re-elected in 2024 with 62.4% of the vote. Addis is seeking re-election to her third term in office.

=== Candidates ===
==== Declared ====
- Dawn Addis (Democratic), incumbent state assemblymember
- Susannah Brown (Democratic), data scientist
- Shannon Kessler (Republican), small business owner

=== Endorsements ===
Dawn Addis (D)

Organizations

- Center for Biological Diversity Action Fund

Political parties

- California Democratic Party

Newspapers

- Santa Cruz Sentinel
Shannon Kessler (R)

Political parties

- California Republican Party

=== Results ===
2026 California's 30th State Assembly district election
Primary election
Party	Candidate	Votes	%
Democratic	Dawn Addis (incumbent)	83,505	54.8
Republican	Shannon Kessler	54,649	35.9
Democratic	Susannah Brown	14,220	9.3
Total votes		152,374	100.0
General election
Democratic	Dawn Addis (incumbent)	135,501	65.3
Republican	Shannon Kessler	72,024	34.7
Total votes		207,525	100.0
Democratic hold			

== District 31 ==
2026 California's 31st State Assembly district election
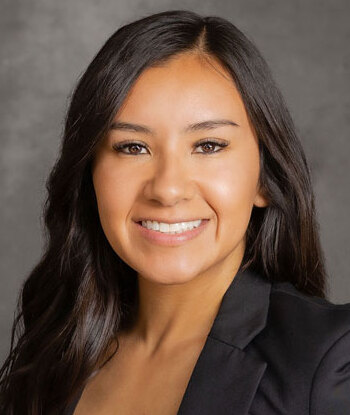

Candidate	Annalisa Perea	Jim Polsgrove
Party	Democratic	Republican
Popular vote	70,399	29,964
Percentage	70.1%	29.9%
State assemblymember before election
Joaquin Arambula
Democratic
State assemblymember after election
Annalisa Perea
Democratic

Incumbent Democrat Joaquin Arambula was re-elected in 2024 with 60.2% of the vote. Arambula has declined to seek a sixth and final term in office, instead seeking to run for Fresno City Council.

=== Candidates ===
==== Declared ====
- Sandra Celedon (Democratic), former member of the Fresno Police Reform Commission
- Annalisa Perea (Democratic), Fresno city councilor and sister of former state assemblymember Henry Perea
- Jim Polsgrove (Republican), engineer

==== Declined ====
- Joaquin Arambula (Democratic), incumbent state assemblymember (running for Fresno City Council)
- Esmeralda Hurtado (Democratic), Sanger city councilor (2020–present) and sister of state senator Melissa Hurtado (running for state senate)

=== Endorsements ===
Sandra Celedon (D)

U.S. senators

- Bernie Sanders, Vermont (2007–present) (Independent)

Organizations

- Center for Biological Diversity Action Fund
- Courage California

Political parties

- California Working Families Party
Annalisa Perea (D)

State legislators

- Esmeralda Soria, state assemblymember from the 27th district (2022–present)

Labor unions

- Fresno-Madera-Kings-Tulare Building Trades Council

Political parties

- California Democratic Party
Jim Polsgrove (R)

Political parties

- California Republican Party

=== Results ===
2026 California's 31st State Assembly district election
Primary election
Party	Candidate	Votes	%
Democratic	Annalisa Perea	26,832	44.6
Republican	Jim Polsgrove	20,682	34.4
Democratic	Sandra Celedon	12,657	21.0
Total votes		60,171	100.0
General election
Democratic	Annalisa Perea	70,399	70.1
Republican	Jim Polsgrove	29,964	29.9
Total votes		100,363	100.0
Democratic hold			

== District 32 ==
2026 California's 32nd State Assembly district election
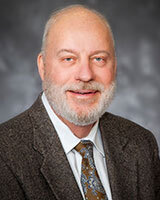
Candidate	David Couch
Party	Republican
Popular vote	129,512
Percentage	100.0%
State assemblymember before election
Stan Ellis
Republican
State assemblymember after election
David Couch
Republican

Incumbent Republican Stan Ellis was first elected with 64.6% in the 2025 special election resulting from the refusal of Vince Fong to take the seat after he had won re-election to both a fifth term in office in the Assembly and his first full term in the House of Representatives for California's 20th Congressional District.

Ellis has declined to seek a full term in office and has endorsed Kern County Supervisor David Couch, a fellow Republican who is running unopposed for the seat.

=== Candidates ===
==== Declared ====
- David Couch (Republican), Kern County supervisor (2013–present)

==== Declined ====
- Stan Ellis (Republican), incumbent state assemblymember

=== Endorsements ===
David Couch (R)

State legislators

- Stan Ellis, incumbent state assemblymember

Political parties

- California Republican Party

Newspapers

- The Bakersfield Californian

=== Results ===
2026 California's 32nd State Assembly district election
Primary election
Party	Candidate	Votes	%
Republican	David Couch	90,040	100.0
Total votes		90,040	100.0
General election
Republican	David Couch	129,512	100.0
Total votes		129,512	100.0
Republican hold			

== District 33 ==
2026 California's 33rd State Assembly district election
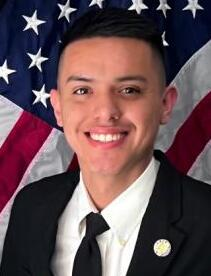

Candidate	Hipolito Cerros	Alexandra Macedo
Party	Democratic	Republican
Popular vote	56,219	54,621
Percentage	50.7%	49.3%
State assemblymember before election
Alexandra Macedo
Republican
State assemblymember after election
Hipolito Cerros
Democratic

Incumbent Republican Alexandra Macedo was first elected in 2024 with 62.5% of the vote. Macedo lost re-election to her second term in office to Democrat and former Lindsay mayor Hipolito Cerros.

=== Candidates ===
==== Declared ====
- Hipolito Cerros (Democratic), former Lindsay mayor (2022–2024) and city councilor (2020–2024); candidate for this district in 2024
- Alexandra Macedo (Republican), incumbent state assemblymember

==== Endorsements ====
Alexandra Macedo (R)

Political parties

- California Republican Party

=== Results ===
2026 California's 33rd State Assembly district election
Primary election
Party	Candidate	Votes	%
Republican	Alexandra Macedo (incumbent)	38,938	61.2
Democratic	Hipolito Cerros	24,656	38.8
Total votes		63,594	100.0
General election
Democratic	Hipolito Cerros	56,219	50.7
Republican	Alexandra Macedo (incumbent)	54,621	49.3
Total votes		110,840	100.0
Democratic gain from Republican			

== District 34 ==
2026 California's 34th State Assembly district election
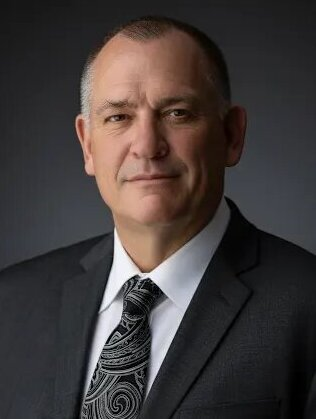

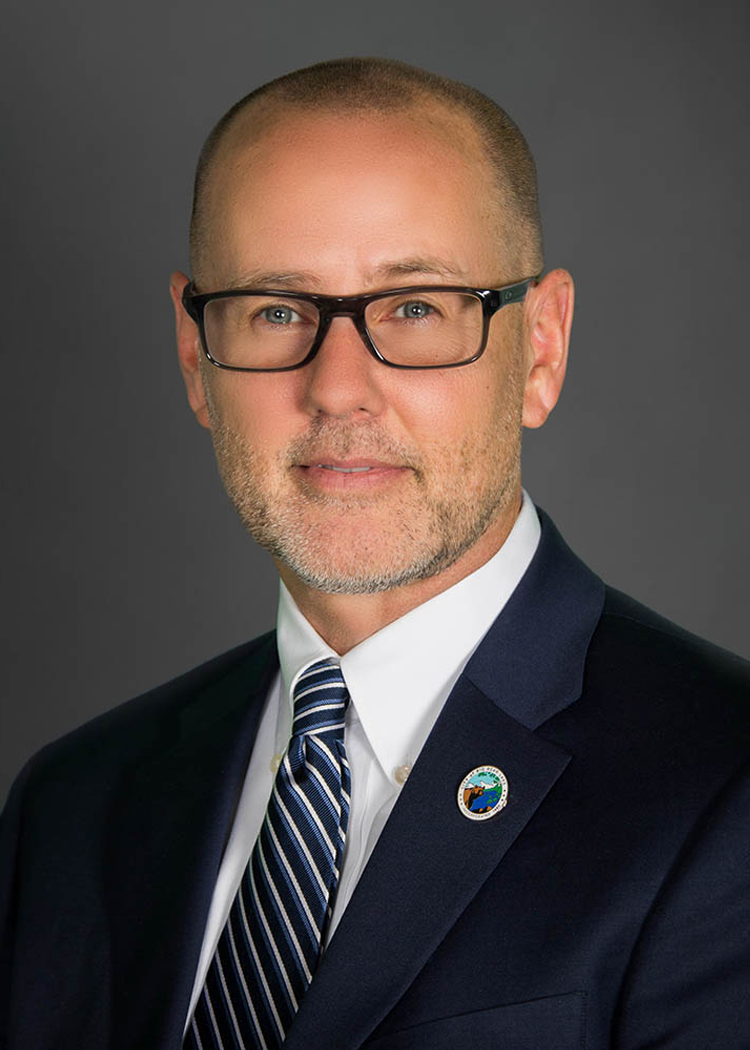
Candidate	Charles Hughes	Randall Putz
Party	Republican	Democratic
Popular vote	79,451	72,320
Percentage	52.3%	47.7%
State assemblymember before election
Tom Lackey
Republican
State assemblymember after election
Charles Hughes
Republican

Incumbent Republican Tom Lackey was re-elected to his sixth and final term in 2024 with 62.0% of the vote. Lackey is term-limited and unable to run for re-election.

=== Candidates ===
==== Declared ====
- Steve Fox (Republican), former Democratic state assemblyman (2012–2014), attorney
- Charles Hughes (Republican), Antelope Valley Union High School District board member
- Manny Lin (Republican), Hesperia Unified School District trustee
- Randall Putz (Democratic), Big Bear Lake city councilor

=== Endorsements ===
Charles Hughes (R)

Political parties

- California Republican Party
Randall Putz (D)

Political parties

- California Democratic Party

=== Results ===
2026 California's 34th State Assembly district election
Primary election
Party	Candidate	Votes	%
Democratic	Randall Putz	40,110	39.2
Republican	Charles Hughes	37,528	36.7
Republican	Steve Fox	19,441	19.0
Republican	Manny Lin	5,169	5.1
Total votes		102,248	100.0
General election
Republican	Charles Hughes	79,451	52.3
Democratic	Randall Putz	72,320	47.7
Total votes		151,771	100.0
Republican hold			

== District 35 ==
2026 California's 35th State Assembly district election
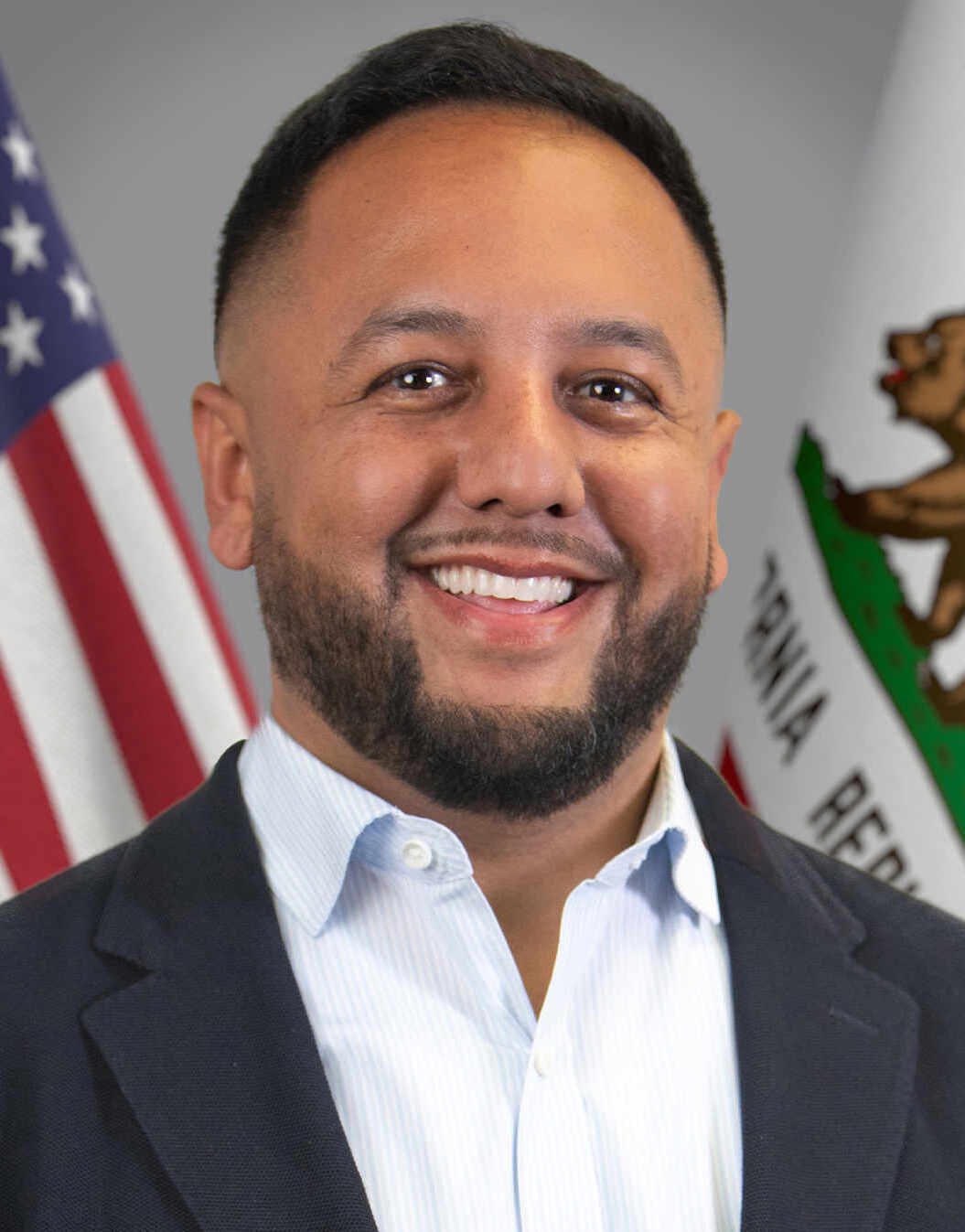

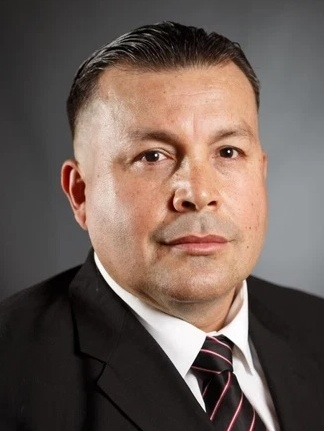
Candidate	Andrae Gonzales	Saul Ayon
Party	Democratic	Republican
Popular vote	66,974	28,970
Percentage	69.8%	30.2%
State assemblymember before election
Jasmeet Bains
Democratic
State assemblymember after election
Andrae Gonzales
Democratic

Incumbent Democrat Jasmeet Bains was re-elected in 2024 with 57.6% of the vote. Bains has declined to seek a third term in office, instead seeking to run for California's 22nd congressional district.

=== Candidates ===
==== Declared ====
- Saul Ayon (Republican), mayor of McFarland
- Andrae Gonzales (Democratic), Bakersfield city councilor (2016–present) and candidate for this district in 2024
- Ana Palacio (Democratic), emergency room nurse

==== Declined ====
- Jasmeet Bains (Democratic), incumbent state assemblymember (running for U.S. House)

=== Endorsements ===
Saul Ayon (R)

Political parties

- California Republican Party

Newspapers

- The Bakersfield Californian (co-endorsement with Gonzales)
Andrae Gonzales (D)

Political parties

- California Democratic Party

Newspapers

- The Bakersfield Californian (co-endorsement with Ayon)
Ana Palacio (D)

Labor unions

- SEIU California

Political parties

- California Working Families Party

=== Results ===
2026 California's 35th State Assembly district election
Primary election
Party	Candidate	Votes	%
Democratic	Andrae Gonzales	18,338	36.7
Republican	Saul Ayon	18,299	36.7
Democratic	Ana Palacio	13,283	26.6
Total votes		49,920	100.0
General election
Democratic	Andrae Gonzales	66,974	69.8
Republican	Saul Ayon	28,970	30.2
Total votes		95,944	100.0
Democratic hold			

== District 36 ==
2026 California's 36th State Assembly district election
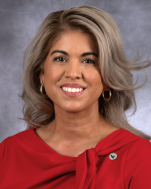

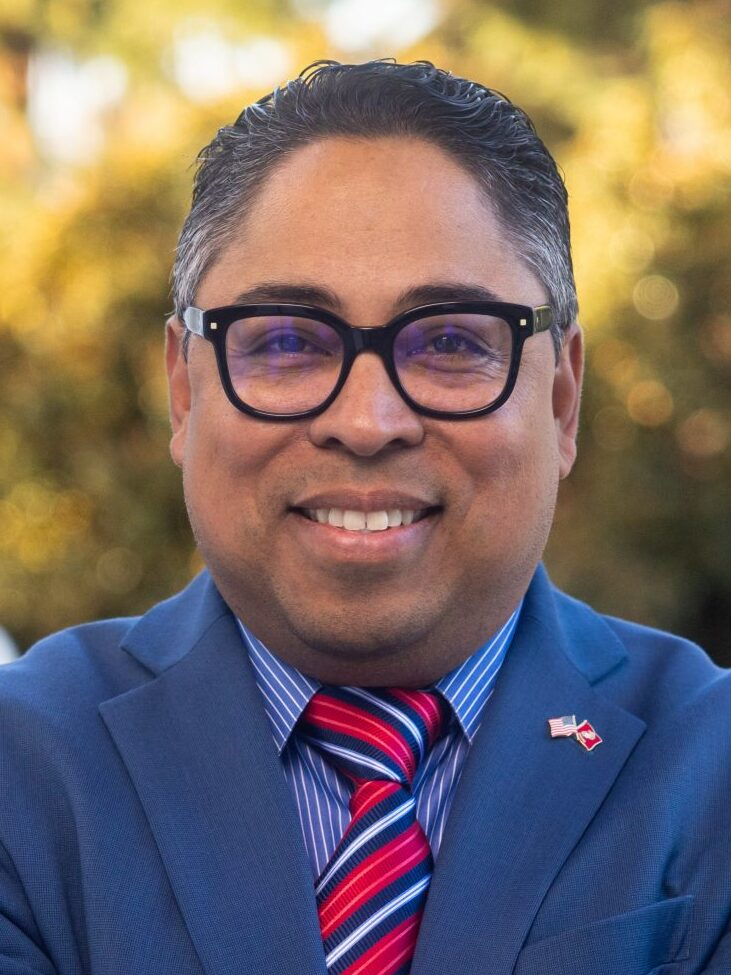
Candidate	Ida Obeso-Martinez	Jeff Gonzalez
Party	Democratic	Republican
Popular vote	75,993	51,163
Percentage	59.8%	40.2%
State assemblymember before election
Jeff Gonzalez
Republican
State assemblymember after election
Ida Obeso-Martinez
Democratic

Incumbent Republican Jeff Gonzalez was first elected in 2024 with 51.8% of the vote in a major upset. Gonzalez is seeking re-election to his second term in office.

=== Candidates ===
==== Declared ====
- Jeff Gonzalez (Republican), incumbent state assemblymember
- Ida Obeso-Martinez (Democratic), mayor of Imperial
- Tomás Oliva (Democratic), former El Centro city councilor
- Oscar Ortiz (Democratic), Indio city councilor and candidate for California's 25th congressional district in 2024

=== Endorsements ===
Jeff Gonzalez (R)

Political parties

- California Republican Party
Oscar Ortiz (D)

Political parties

- California Working Families Party
Declined to endorse

Political parties

- California Democratic Party

=== Results ===
2026 California's 36th State Assembly district election
Primary election
Party	Candidate	Votes	%
Republican	Jeff Gonzalez (incumbent)	36,468	44.6
Democratic	Ida Obeso-Martinez	19,661	24.1
Democratic	Oscar Ortiz	17,994	22.0
Democratic	Tomás Oliva	7,607	9.3
Total votes		81,730	100.0
General election
Democratic	Ida Obeso-Martinez	75,993	59.8
Republican	Jeff Gonzalez (incumbent)	51,163	40.2
Total votes		127,156	100.0
Democratic gain from Republican			

== District 37 ==
2026 California's 37th State Assembly district election
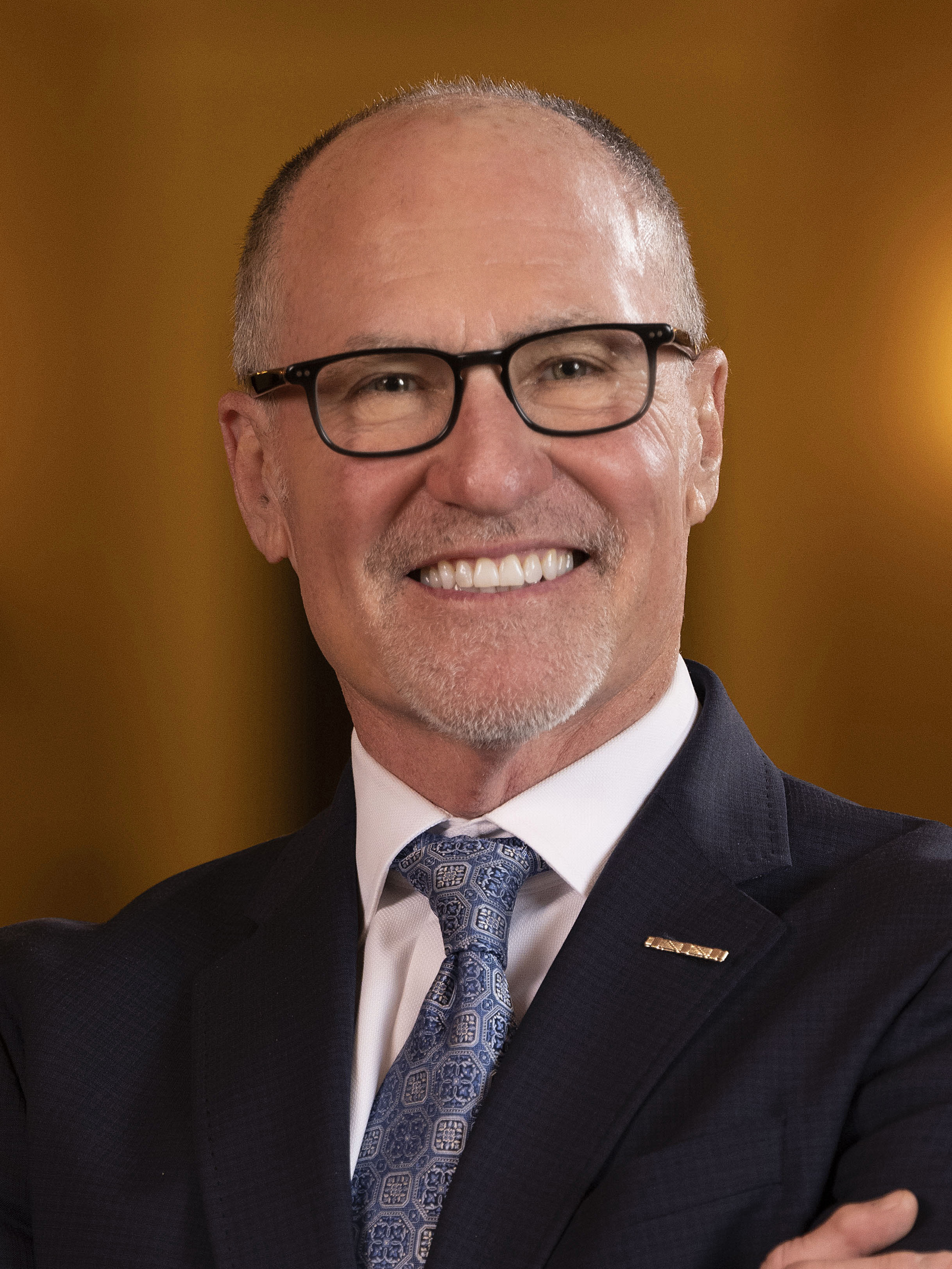

Candidate	Gregg Hart	Sari Domingues
Party	Democratic	Republican
Popular vote	112,489	54,976
Percentage	67.2%	32.8%
State assemblymember before election
Gregg Hart
Democratic
State assemblymember after election
Gregg Hart
Democratic

Incumbent Democrat Gregg Hart was re-elected in 2024 with 60.7% of the vote. Hart is seeking re-election to his third term in office.

=== Candidates ===
==== Declared ====
- Sari Domingues (Republican), retired business analyst and runner-up for this district in 2024
- Gregg Hart (Democratic), incumbent state assemblymember

=== Endorsements ===
Sari Domingues (R)

Political parties

- California Republican Party
Gregg Hart (D)

Organizations

- Center for Biological Diversity Action Fund

Political parties

- California Democratic Party

=== Results ===
2026 California's 37th State Assembly district election
Primary election
Party	Candidate	Votes	%
Democratic	Gregg Hart (incumbent)	71,528	62.5
Republican	Sari Domingues	42,848	37.5
Total votes		114,376	100.0
General election
Democratic	Gregg Hart (incumbent)	112,489	67.2
Republican	Sari Domingues	54,976	32.8
Total votes		167,465	100.0
Democratic hold			

== District 38 ==
2026 California's 38th State Assembly district election
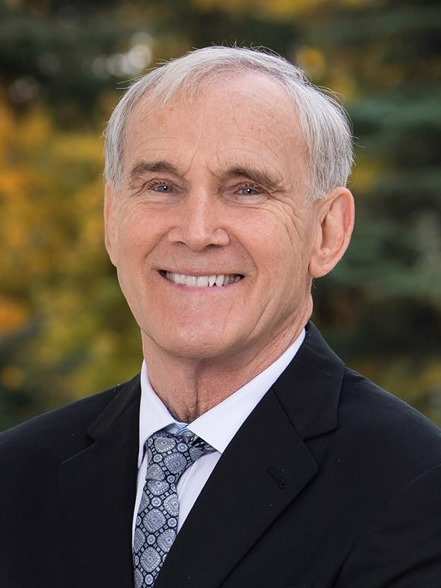

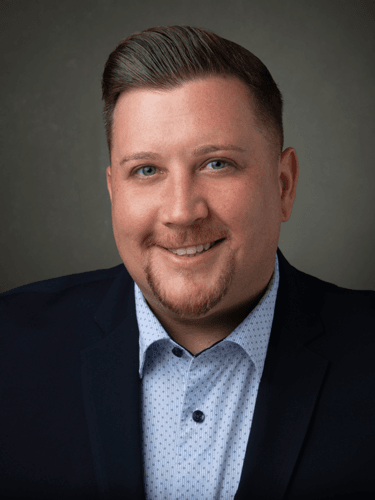
Candidate	Steve Bennett	Michael MacDonald
Party	Democratic	Democratic
Popular vote	97,311	42,030
Percentage	69.8%	30.2%
State assemblymember before election
Steve Bennett
Democratic
State assemblymember after election
Steve Bennett
Democratic

Incumbent Democrat Steve Bennett was re-elected in 2024 with 63.4% of the vote. Bennett is seeking re-election to his fifth term in office.

=== Candidates ===
==== Declared ====
- Steve Bennett (Democratic), incumbent state assemblymember
- Michael MacDonald (Democratic), Ventura city clerk

=== Endorsements ===
Steve Bennett (D)

Political parties

- California Democratic Party

=== Results ===
2026 California's 38th State Assembly district election
Primary election
Party	Candidate	Votes	%
Democratic	Steve Bennett (incumbent)	56,992	69.4
Democratic	Michael MacDonald	25,106	30.6
Total votes		82,098	100.0
General election
Democratic	Steve Bennett (incumbent)	97,311	69.8
Democratic	Michael MacDonald	42,030	30.2
Total votes		139,341	100.0
Democratic hold			

== District 39 ==
2026 California's 39th State Assembly district election
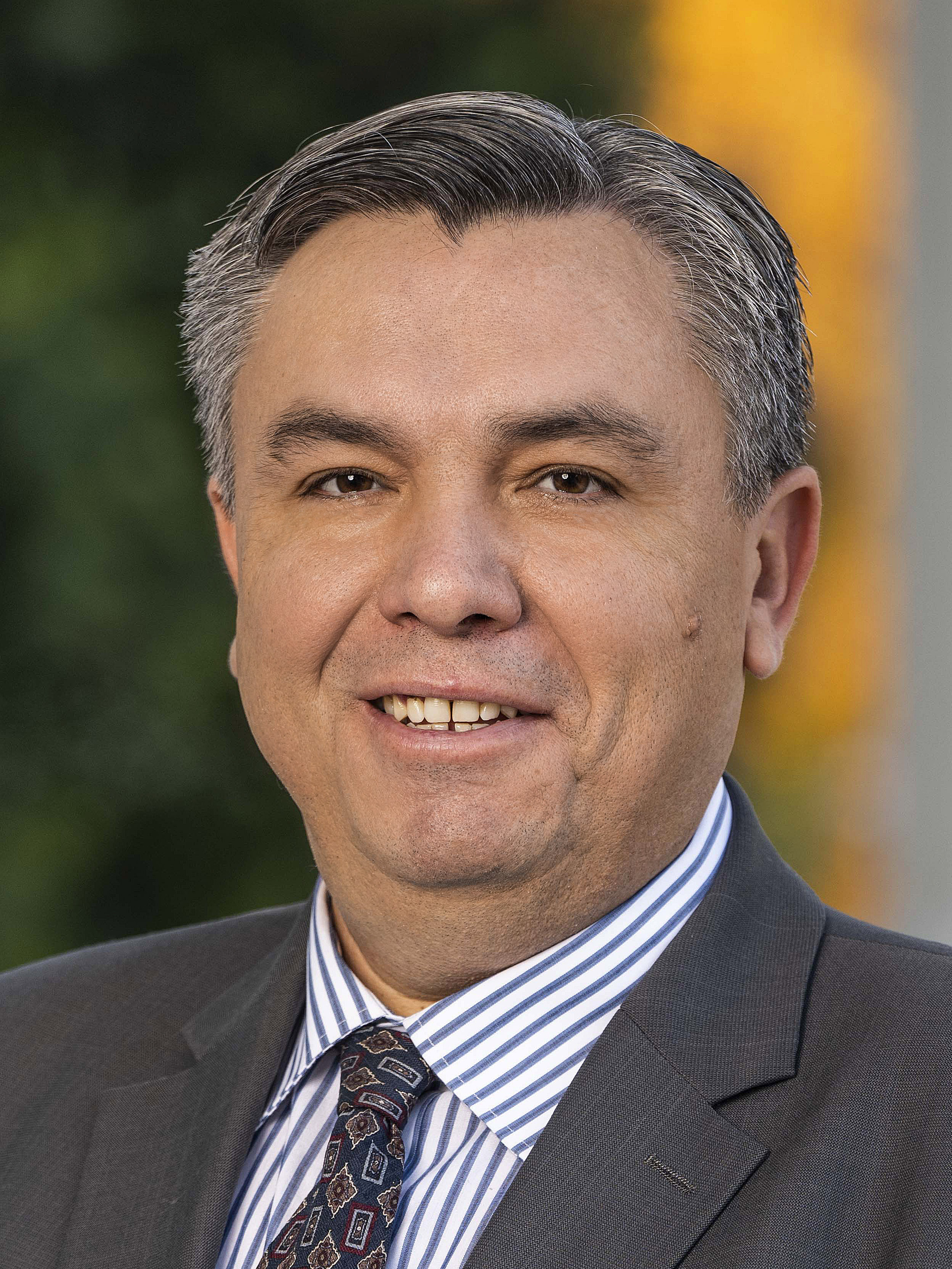

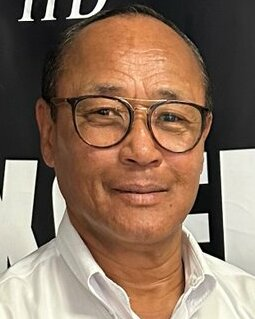
Candidate	Juan Carrillo	Paul Marsh
Party	Democratic	Republican
Popular vote	74,258	30,147
Percentage	71.1%	28.9%
State assemblymember before election
Juan Carrillo
Democratic
State assemblymember after election
Juan Carrillo
Democratic

Incumbent Democrat Juan Carrillo was re-elected in 2024 with 57.7% of the vote. Carrillo is seeking re-election to his third term in office.

=== Candidates ===
==== Declared ====
- Juan Carrillo (Democratic), incumbent state assemblymember
- Paul Marsh (Republican), perennial candidate

=== Endorsements ===
Juan Carrillo (D)

Political parties

- California Democratic Party
Paul Marsh (R)

Political parties

- California Republican Party

=== Results ===
2026 California's 39th State Assembly district election
Primary election
Party	Candidate	Votes	%
Democratic	Juan Carrillo (incumbent)	35,480	62.3
Republican	Paul Marsh	21,439	37.7
Total votes		56,919	100.0
General election
Democratic	Juan Carrillo (incumbent)	74,258	71.1
Republican	Paul Marsh	30,147	28.9
Total votes		104,405	100.0
Democratic hold			

== District 40 ==
2026 California's 40th State Assembly district election
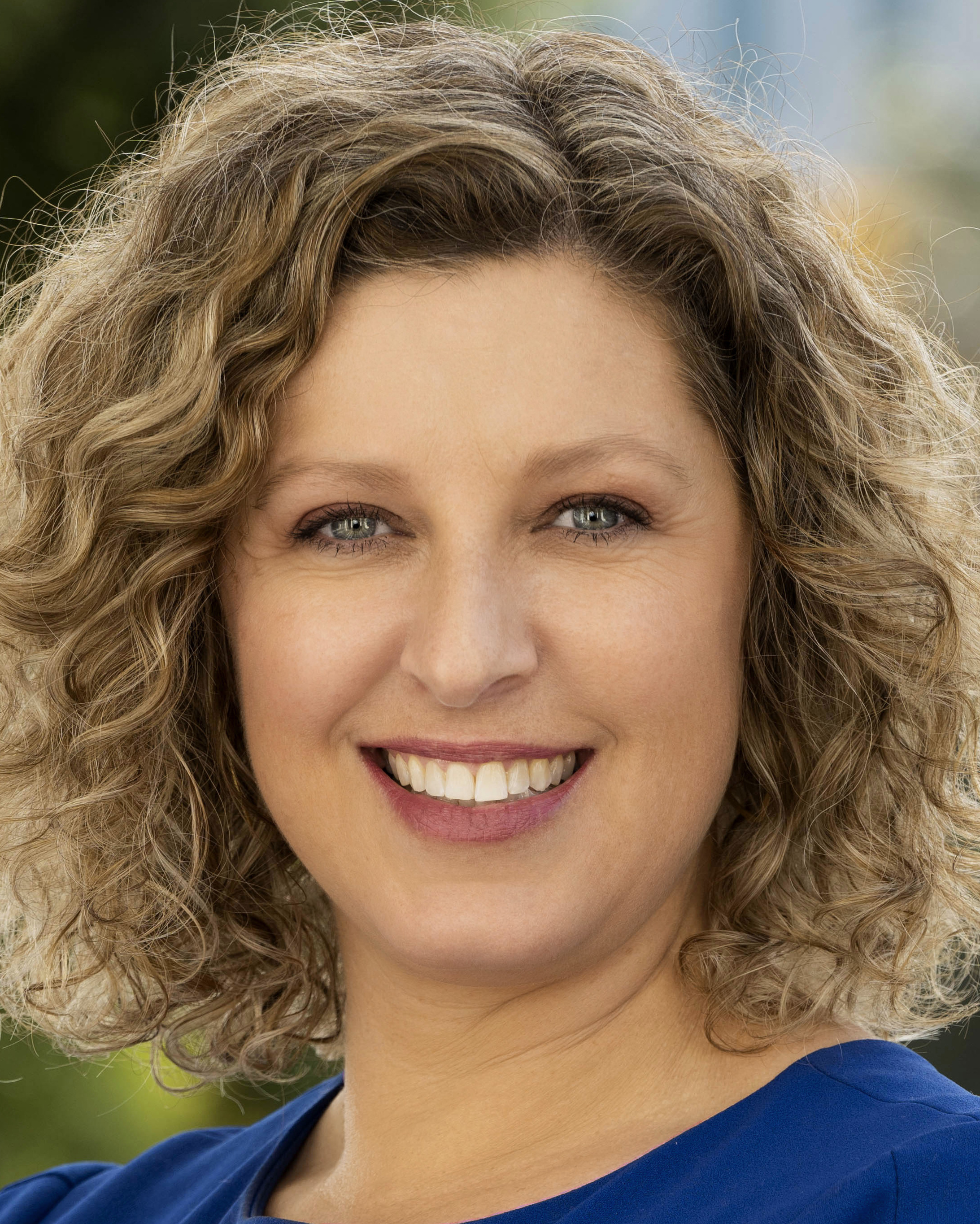

Candidate	Pilar Schiavo	Rickey Hayes
Party	Democratic	Republican
Popular vote	115,203	73,587
Percentage	61.0%	39.0%
State assemblymember before election
Pilar Schiavo
Democratic
State assemblymember after election
Pilar Schiavo
Democratic

Incumbent Democrat Pilar Schiavo was re-elected in 2024 with 52.8% of the vote. Schiavo is seeking re-election to her third term in office.

=== Candidates ===
==== Declared ====
- Elizabeth Wong Ahlers (Republican), former Crescenta Valley town councilor, runner-up for California's 25th senatorial district in 2024
- Andreas Farmakalidis (Republican), business owner
- Rickey Tracy Hayes II (Republican), U.S. Marine veteran, former police officer
- Pilar Schiavo (Democratic), incumbent state assemblymember

=== Endorsements ===
Elizabeth Wong Ahlers (R)

Newspapers

- The Santa Clarita Valley Signal (co-endorsement with Schiavo)
Pilar Schiavo (D)

Political parties

- California Democratic Party

Newspapers

- The Santa Clarita Valley Signal (co-endorsement with Ahlers)

=== Results ===
2026 California's 40th State Assembly district election
Primary election
Party	Candidate	Votes	%
Democratic	Pilar Schiavo (incumbent)	74,496	55.6
Republican	Rickey Hayes II	29,879	22.3
Republican	Elizabeth Ahlers	18,694	14.0
Republican	Andreas Farmakalidis	10,855	8.1
Total votes		133,924	100.0
General election
Democratic	Pilar Schiavo (incumbent)	115,203	61.0
Republican	Rickey Hayes II	73,587	39.0
Total votes		188,790	100.0
Democratic hold			

== District 41 ==
2026 California's 41st State Assembly district election
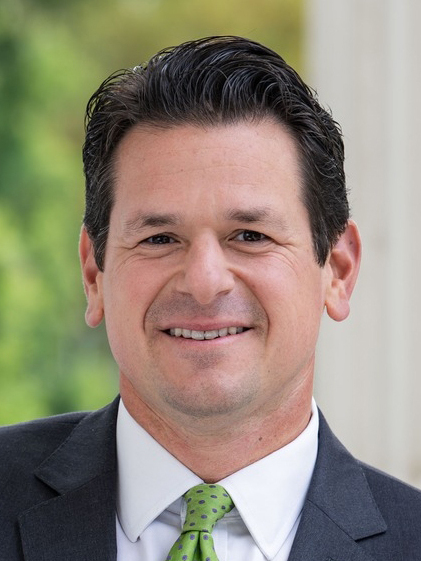

Candidate	John Harabedian	Adam Vena
Party	Democratic	Republican
Popular vote	129,979	67,951
Percentage	65.7%	34.3%
State assemblymember before election
John Harabedian
Democratic
State assemblymember after election
John Harabedian
Democratic

Incumbent Democrat John Harabedian was first elected in 2024 with 58.5% of the vote. Harabedian is seeking re-election to his second term in office.

=== Candidates ===
==== Declared ====
- John Harabedian (Democratic), incumbent state assemblymember
- Adam Christopher Vena (Republican)

=== Endorsements ===
John Harabedian (D)

Political parties

- California Democratic Party

=== Results ===
2026 California's 41st State Assembly district election
Primary election
Party	Candidate	Votes	%
Democratic	John Harabedian (incumbent)	92,071	63.3
Republican	Adam Vena	53,332	36.7
Total votes		145,403	100.0
General election
Democratic	John Harabedian (incumbent)	129,979	65.7
Republican	Adam Vena	67,951	34.3
Total votes		197,930	100.0
Democratic hold			

== District 42 ==
2026 California's 42nd State Assembly district election
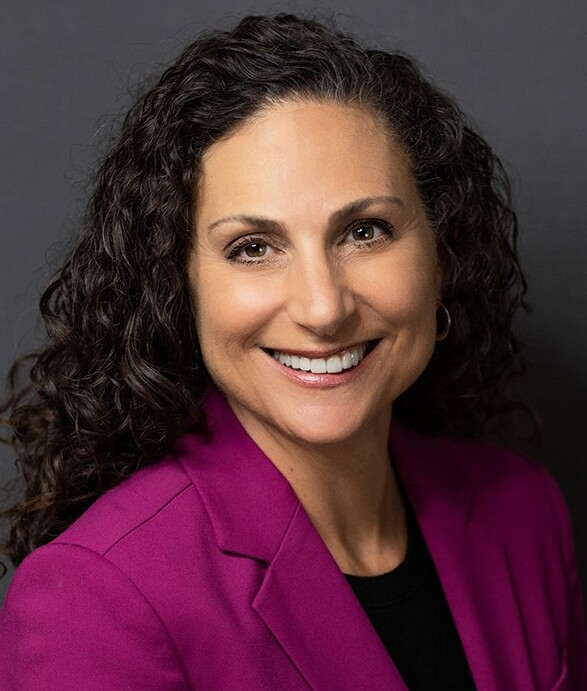

Candidate	Deborah Klein Lopez	Ted Norblum
Party	Democratic	Republican
Popular vote	126,227	97,112
Percentage	56.5%	43.5%
State assemblymember before election
Jacqui Irwin
Democratic
State assemblymember after election
Deborah Klein Lopez
Democratic

Incumbent Democrat Jacqui Irwin was re-elected in 2024 to her sixth and final term in office with 54.3% of the vote. Irwin is term-limited and unable to run for re-election.

=== Candidates ===
==== Declared ====
- Deborah Klein Lopez (Democratic), mayor pro tem of Agoura Hills
- Ted Nordblum (Republican), business owner, runner-up for this district in 2024 and candidate in 2022
- Rocky Rhodes (Republican), Simi Valley city councilor

==== Disqualified ====
- Kelly Honig (Democratic), Westlake Village city councilor

==== Withdrawn ====
- Dan Weikel (Republican), member of the Thousand Oaks Traffic Commission

=== Endorsements ===
Deborah Klein Lopez (D)

U.S. representatives

- Julia Brownley, CA-26 (2013–present)

State legislators

- Jacqui Irwin, incumbent state assemblymember (2014–present)
- Henry Stern, state senator from the 27th district (2016–present)

County officials

- Lindsey Horvath, Los Angeles County supervisor from the 3rd district (2022–present)

Organizations

- Center for Biological Diversity Action Fund

Political parties

- California Democratic Party

=== Results ===
2026 California's 42nd State Assembly district election
Primary election
Party	Candidate	Votes	%
Democratic	Deborah Klein Lopez	85,368	52.7
Republican	Ted Nordblum	41,522	25.7
Republican	Rocky Rhodes	34,985	21.6
Total votes		161,875	100.0
General election
Democratic	Deborah Klein Lopez	126,227	56.5
Republican	Ted Nordblum	97,112	43.5
Total votes		223,339	100.0
Democratic hold			

== District 43 ==
2026 California's 43rd State Assembly district election

Candidate	Celeste Rodriguez	Ricardo Benitez
Party	Democratic	Republican
Popular vote	96,811	23,027
Percentage	80.8%	19.2%
State assemblymember before election
Celeste Rodriguez
Democratic
State assemblymember after election
Celeste Rodriguez
Democratic

Incumbent Democrat Celeste Rodriguez was first elected in 2024 with 66.6% of the vote. Rodriguez is seeking re-election to her second term in office.

=== Candidates ===
==== Declared ====
- Ricardo Benitez (Republican), perennial candidate
- Celeste Rodriguez (Democratic), incumbent state assemblymember

=== Endorsements ===
Celese Rodriguez (D)

Political parties

- California Democratic Party

=== Results ===
2026 California's 43rd State Assembly district election
Primary election
Party	Candidate	Votes	%
Democratic	Celeste Rodriguez (incumbent)	53,703	74.9
Republican	Ricardo Benitez	17,999	25.1
Total votes		71,702	100.0
General election
Democratic	Celeste Rodriguez (incumbent)	96,811	80.8
Republican	Ricardo Benitez	23,027	19.2
Total votes		119,838	100.0
Democratic hold			

== District 44 ==
2026 California's 44th State Assembly district election
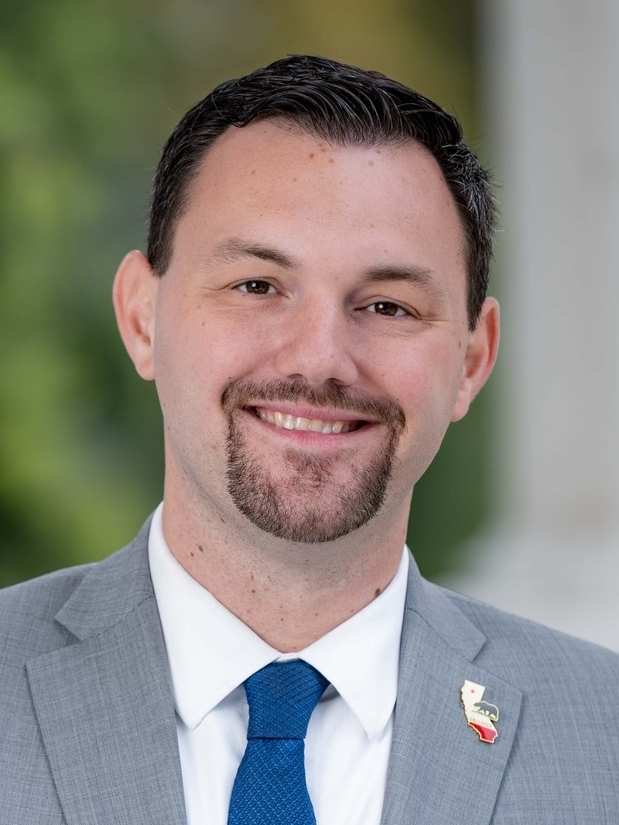

Candidate	Nick Schultz	Carolyn Daniels
Party	Democratic	Republican
Popular vote	134,814	48,801
Percentage	73.4%	26.6%
State assemblymember before election
Nick Schultz
Democratic
State assemblymember after election
Nick Schultz
Democratic

Incumbent Democrat Nick Schultz was first elected in 2024 with 65.9% of the vote. Schultz is seeking re-election to his second term in office.

=== Candidates ===
==== Declared ====
- Carolyn Daniels (Republican)
- Charlotte Gerry (Republican), dentist
- Nick Schultz (Democratic), incumbent state assemblymember

=== Endorsements ===
Nick Schultz (D)

Political parties

- California Democratic Party
- California Working Families Party

=== Results ===
2026 California's 44th State Assembly district election
Primary election
Party	Candidate	Votes	%
Democratic	Nick Schultz (incumbent)	97,191	71.2
Republican	Carolyn Daniels	28,269	20.7
Republican	Charlotte Gerry	11,094	8.1
Total votes		136,554	100.0
General election
Democratic	Nick Schultz (incumbent)	134,814	73.4
Republican	Carolyn Daniels	48,801	26.6
Total votes		183,615	100.0
Democratic hold			

== District 45 ==
2026 California's 45th State Assembly district election
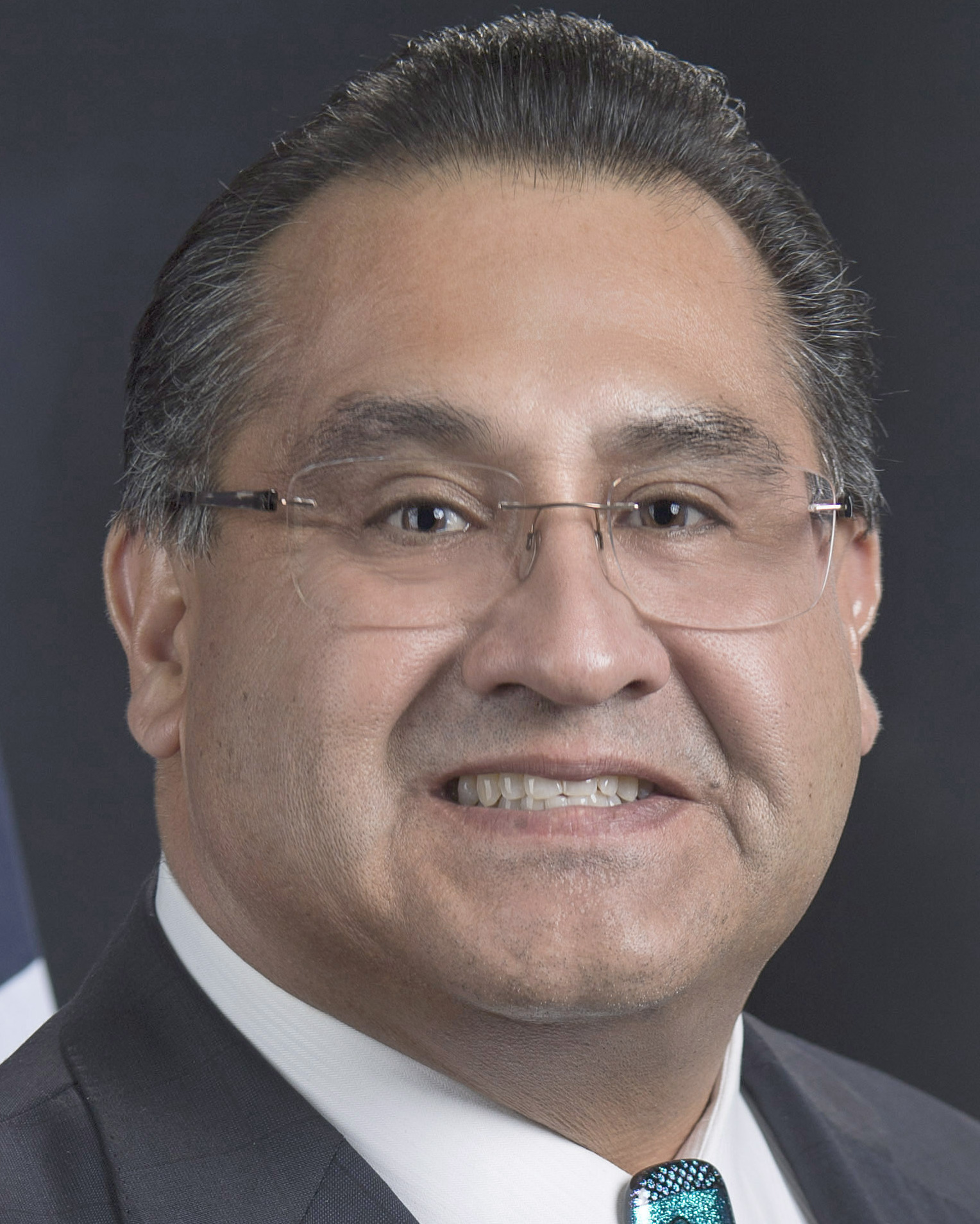

Candidate	James Ramos	Greg Abdouch
Party	Democratic	Republican
Popular vote	85,674	32,561
Percentage	72.5%	27.5%
State assemblymember before election
James Ramos
Democratic
State assemblymember after election
James Ramos
Democratic

Incumbent Democrat James Ramos was re-elected in 2024 with 63.8% of the vote. Ramos is seeking re-election to his fifth term in office.

=== Candidates ===
==== Declared ====
- Greg Abdouch (Republican), small business owner
- James Ramos (Democratic), incumbent state assemblymember

=== Endorsements ===
Greg Abdouch (R)

Political parties

- California Republican Party
James Ramos (D)

Political parties

- California Democratic Party

=== Results ===
2026 California's 45th State Assembly district election
Primary election
Party	Candidate	Votes	%
Democratic	James Ramos (incumbent)	44,283	65.6
Republican	Greg Abdouch	23,188	34.4
Total votes		67,471	100.0
General election
Democratic	James Ramos (incumbent)	85,674	72.5
Republican	Greg Abdouch	32,561	27.5
Total votes		118,235	100.0
Democratic hold			

== District 46 ==
2026 California's 46th State Assembly district election
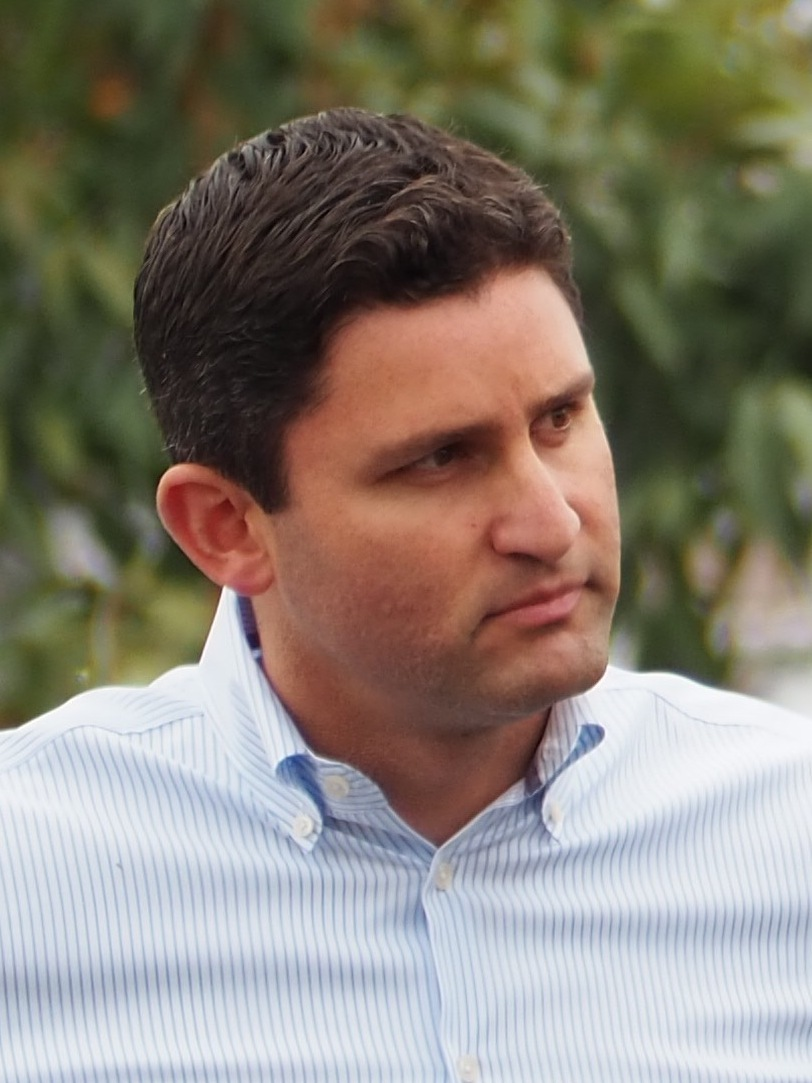

Candidate	Jesse Gabriel	Tracey Schroeder
Party	Democratic	Republican
Popular vote	105,249	43,257
Percentage	70.9%	29.1%
State assemblymember before election
Jesse Gabriel
Democratic
State assemblymember after election
Jesse Gabriel
Democratic

Incumbent Democrat Jesse Gabriel was re-elected in 2024 with 62.9% of the vote. Ramos is seeking re-election to his fifth full term in office.

=== Candidates ===
==== Declared ====
- Jesse Gabriel (Democratic), incumbent state assemblymember
- Tracey Schroeder (Republican), teacher and runner-up for this district in 2024

=== Endorsements ===
Jesse Gabriel (D)

Political parties

- California Democratic Party
Tracey Schroeder (R)

Political parties

- California Republican Party

=== Results ===
2026 California's 46th State Assembly district election
Primary election
Party	Candidate	Votes	%
Democratic	Jesse Gabriel (incumbent)	68,506	66.2
Republican	Tracey Schroeder	34,973	33.8
Total votes		103,479	100.0
General election
Democratic	Jesse Gabriel (incumbent)	105,249	70.9
Republican	Tracey Schroeder	43,257	29.1
Total votes		148,506	100.0
Democratic hold			

== District 47 ==
2026 California's 47th State Assembly district election

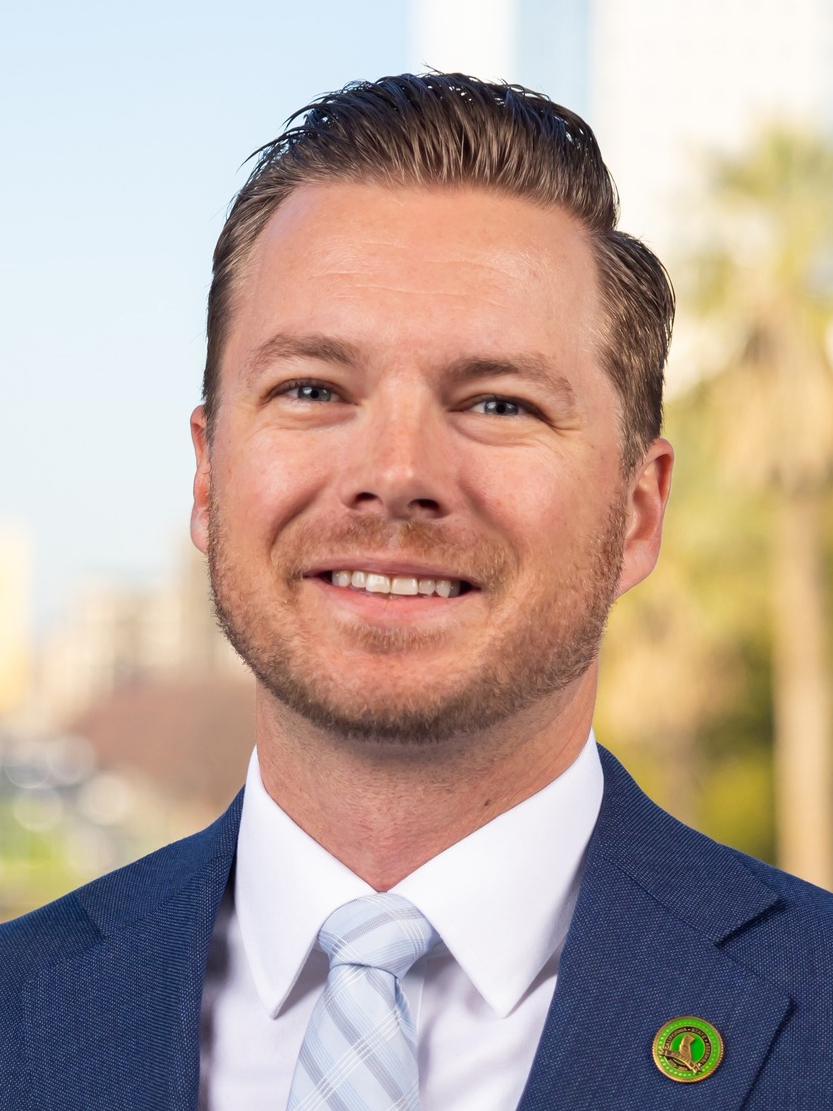
Candidate	Leila Namvar	Greg Wallis
Party	Democratic	Republican
Popular vote	110,599	87,212
Percentage	55.9%	44.1%
State assemblymember before election
Greg Wallis
Republican
State assemblymember after election
Leila Namvar
Democratic

Incumbent Republican Greg Wallis was re-elected in 2024 with 51.2% of the vote. Wallis is seeking re-election to his third term in office.

=== Candidates ===
==== Declared ====
- Jason Byors (Democratic), software engineer (previously ran for the 41st congressional district)
- Leila Namvar (Democratic), union organizer
- Greg Wallis (Republican), incumbent state assemblymember

==== Withdrawn ====
- Lucas Piñon (Democratic), director of special projects for U.S. Representative Raul Ruiz

=== Endorsements ===
Jason Byors (D)

State legislators

- Corey Jackson, state assemblymember from the 60th district (2022–present)
Declined to endorse

Political parties

- California Democratic Party

=== Results ===
2026 California's 47th State Assembly district election
Primary election
Party	Candidate	Votes	%
Republican	Greg Wallis (incumbent)	68,831	48.1
Democratic	Leila Namvar	46,256	32.3
Democratic	Jason Byors	27,915	19.5
Total votes		143,002	100.0
General election
Democratic	Leila Namvar	110,599	55.9
Republican	Greg Wallis (incumbent)	87,212	44.1
Total votes		197,811	100.0

== District 48 ==
2026 California's 48th State Assembly district election
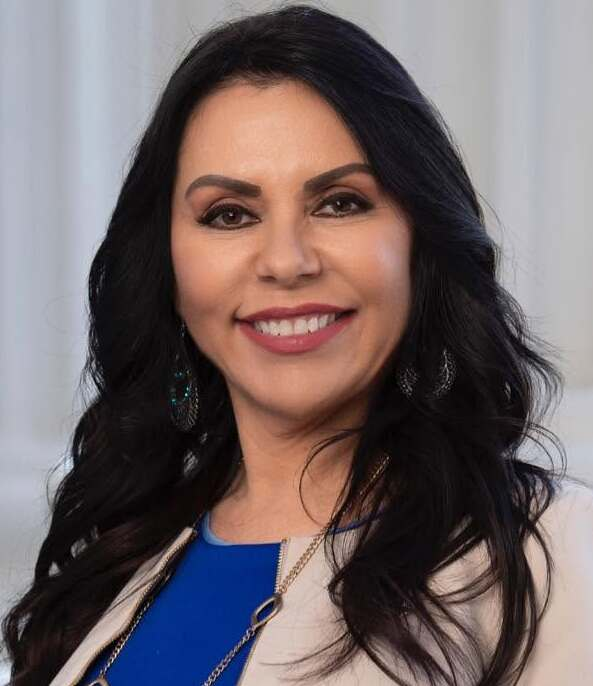

Candidate	Blanca Rubio	Dan Tran
Party	Democratic	Republican
Popular vote	100,625	43,176
Percentage	70.0%	30.0%
State assemblymember before election
Blanca Rubio
Democratic
State assemblymember after election
Blanca Rubio
Democratic

Incumbent Democrat Blanca Rubio was re-elected in 2024 with 61.8% of the vote. Rubio is seeking re-election to her sixth and final term in office.

=== Candidates ===
==== Declared ====
- Blanca Rubio (Democratic), incumbent state assemblymember
- Dan Tran (Republican), real estate businessman and runner-up for this district in 2024

=== Endorsements ===
Blanca Rubio (D)

Political parties

- California Democratic Party

=== Results ===
2026 California's 48th State Assembly district election
Primary election
Party	Candidate	Votes	%
Democratic	Blanca Rubio (incumbent)	59,612	65.3
Republican	Dan Tran	31,738	34.7
Total votes		91,350	100.0
General election
Democratic	Blanca Rubio (incumbent)	100,625	70.0
Republican	Dan Tran	43,176	30.0
Total votes		143,801	100.0
Democratic hold			

== District 49 ==
2026 California's 49th State Assembly district election
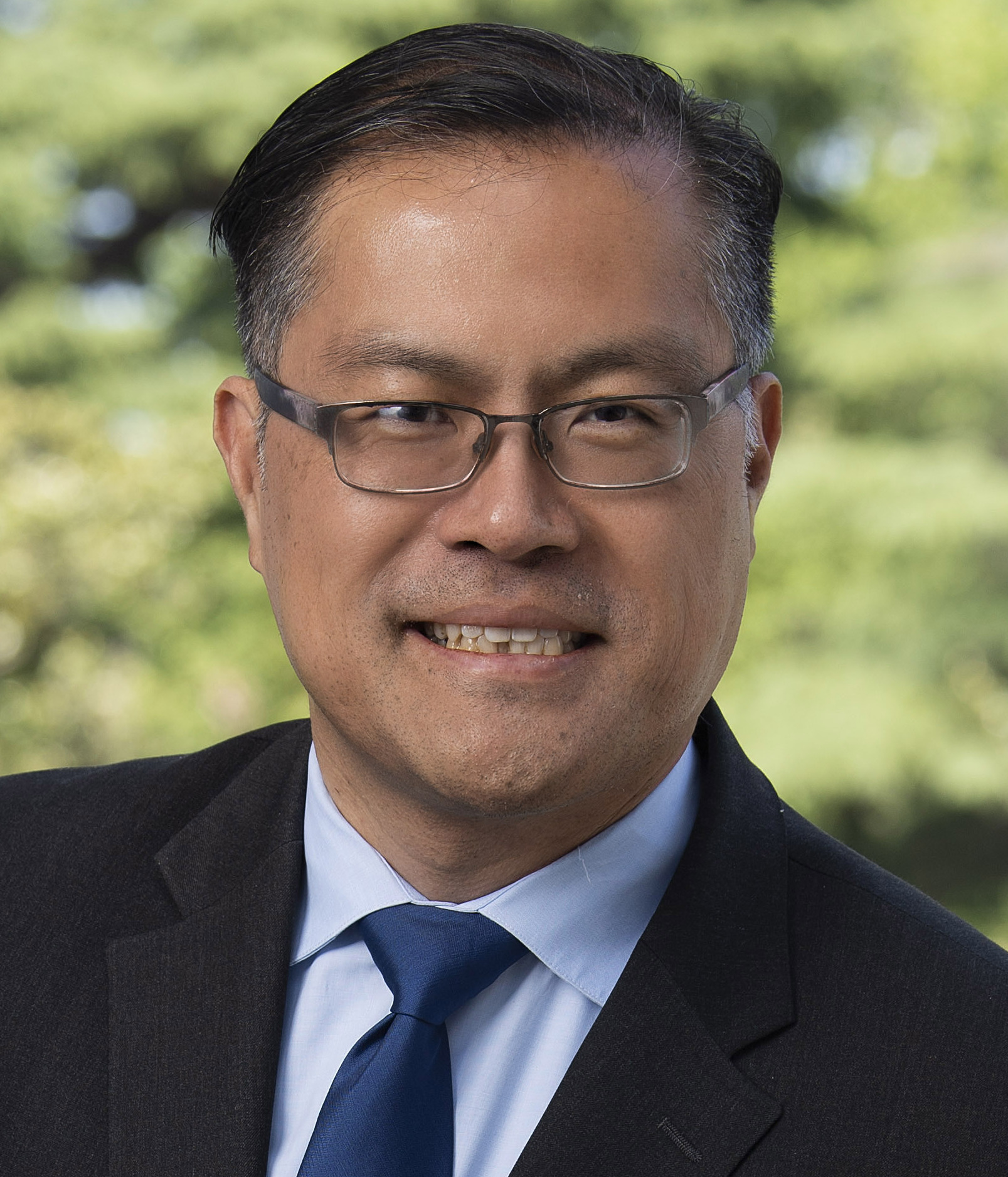

Candidate	Mike Fong	Long David Liu
Party	Democratic	Republican
Popular vote	89,980	38,240
Percentage	70.2%	29.8%
State assemblymember before election
Mike Fong
Democratic
State assemblymember after election
Mike Fong
Democratic

Incumbent Democrat Mike Fong was re-elected in 2024 with 62.0% of the vote. Fong is seeking re-election to his third full term in office.

=== Candidates ===
==== Declared ====
- Mike Fong (Democratic), incumbent state assemblymember
- Long David Liu (Republican), attorney

=== Endorsements ===
Mike Fong (D)

Political parties

- California Democratic Party
Long David Liu (R)

Political parties

- California Republican Party

=== Results ===
2026 California's 49th State Assembly district election
Primary election
Party	Candidate	Votes	%
Democratic	Mike Fong (incumbent)	60,484	68.2
Republican	Long David Liu	28,250	31.8
Total votes		88,734	100.0
General election
Democratic	Mike Fong (incumbent)	89,980	70.2
Republican	Long David Liu	38,240	29.8
Total votes		128,220	100.0
Democratic hold			

== District 50 ==
2026 California's 50th State Assembly district election
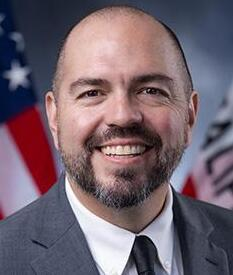

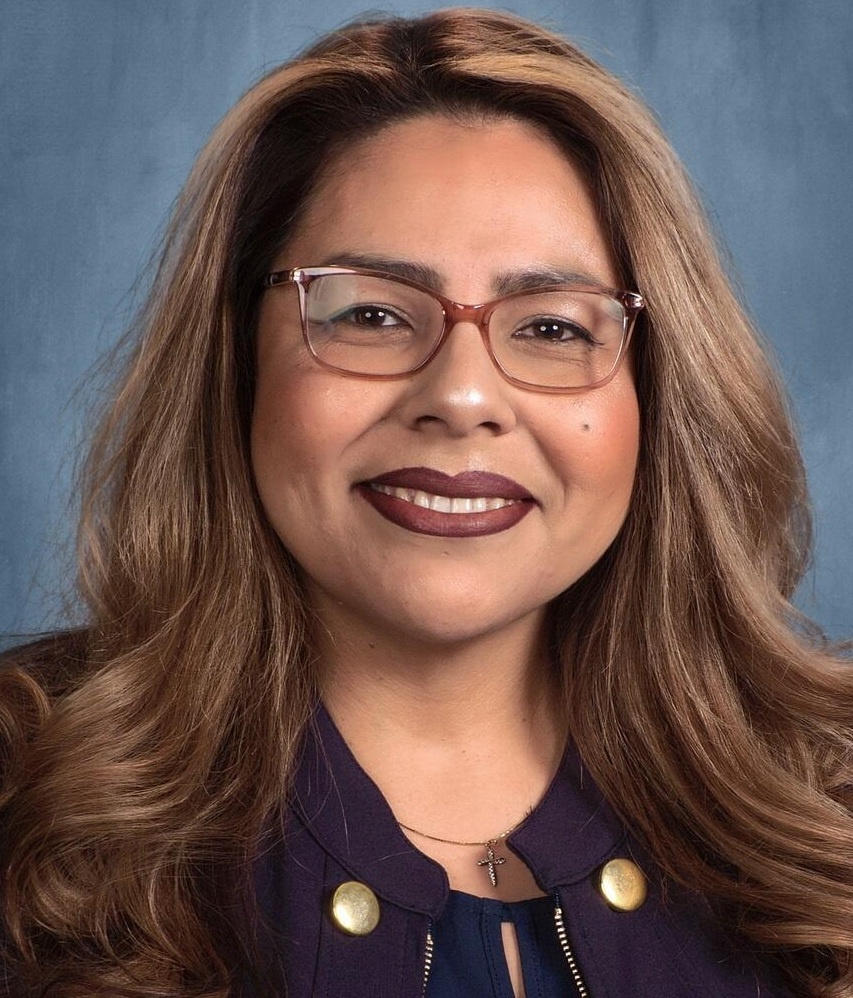
Candidate	Robert Garcia	Victoria Mageno
Party	Democratic	Republican
Popular vote	90,117	43,487
Percentage	67.4%	32.6%
State assemblymember before election
Robert Garcia
Democratic
State assemblymember after election
Robert Garcia
Democratic

Incumbent Democrat Robert Garcia was first elected in 2024 with 56.4% of the vote. Garcia is seeking re-election to his second term in office.

=== Candidates ===
==== Declared ====
- Robert Garcia (Democratic), incumbent state assemblymember
- Victoria Viveros Mageno (Republican), Cucamonga School Board trustee
- Roberto Jesus Moreno, Jr. (No party preference), substitute teacher

=== Endorsements ===
Robert Garcia (D)

Political parties

- California Democratic Party
Victoria Viveros Mageno (R)

Political parties

- California Republican Party

=== Results ===
2026 California's 50th State Assembly district election
Primary election
Party	Candidate	Votes	%
Democratic	Robert Garcia (incumbent)	44,497	58.2
Republican	Victoria Viveros Mageno	29,596	38.7
No party preference	Robert Moreno Jr.	2,364	3.1
Total votes		76,457	100.0
General election
Democratic	Robert Garcia (incumbent)	90,117	67.4
Republican	Victoria Viveros Mageno	43,487	32.6
Total votes		133,604	100.0
Democratic hold			

== District 51 ==
2026 California's 51st State Assembly district election
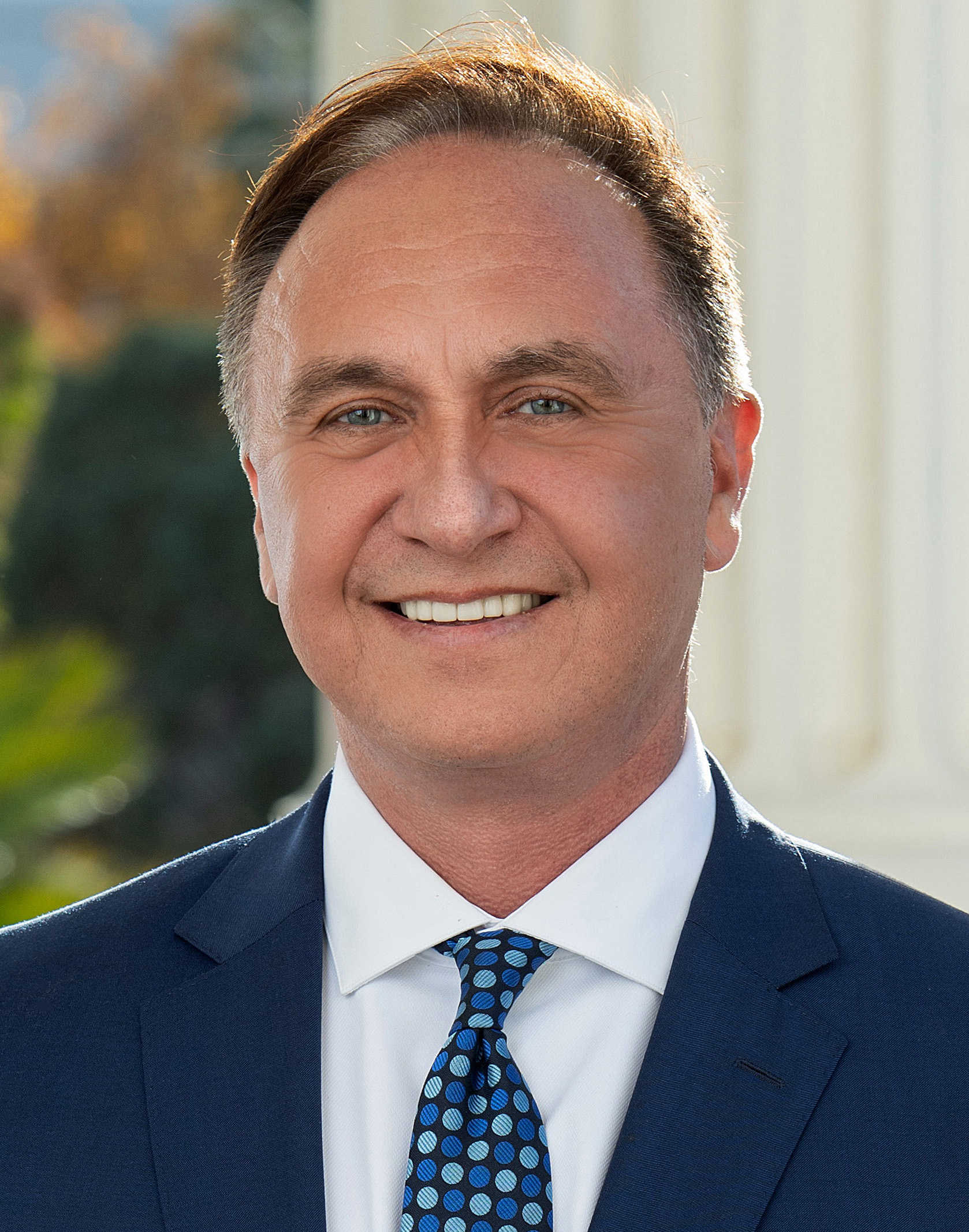

Candidate	Rick Zbur	Colin Hernandez
Party	Democratic	Democratic
Popular vote	93,714	63,603
Percentage	59.6%	40.4%
State assemblymember before election
Rick Zbur
Democratic
State assemblymember after election
Rick Zbur
Democratic

Incumbent Democrat Rick Zbur was re-elected in 2024 with 75.0% of the vote. Zbur is seeking re-election to his third term in office.

=== Candidates ===
==== Declared ====
- Michael Geraghty (Republican), retired businessman
- Jake Head (Republican), military recruiter
- Colin D. Hernandez (Democratic), digital communications strategist
- Dick Lucas (No party preference)
- Rick Zbur (Democratic), incumbent state assemblymember

=== Endorsements ===
Rick Zbur (D)

Political parties

- California Democratic Party

=== Results ===
2026 California's 51st State Assembly district election
Primary election
Party	Candidate	Votes	%
Democratic	Rick Zbur (incumbent)	71,047	54.1
Democratic	Colin Hernandez	29,026	22.1
Republican	Jake Head	15,372	11.7
Republican	Michael Geraghty	12,412	9.4
No party preference	Dick Lucas	3,552	2.7
Total votes		131,409	100.0
General election
Democratic	Rick Zbur (incumbent)	93,714	59.6
Democratic	Colin Hernandez	63,603	40.4
Total votes		157,317	100.0
Democratic hold			

== District 52 ==
2026 California's 52nd State Assembly district election
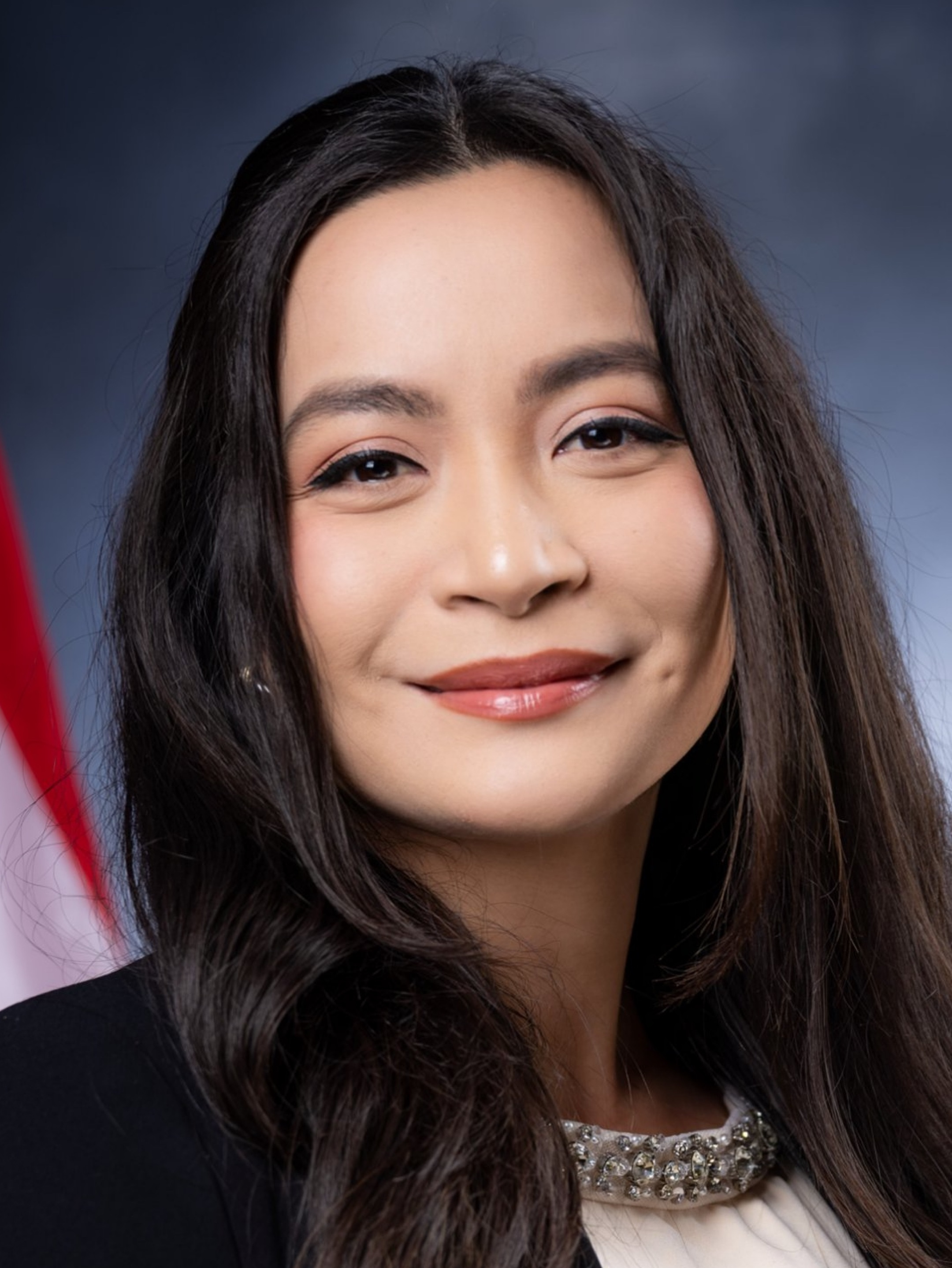

Candidate	Jessica Caloza	Andrea Lee Anderson
Party	Democratic	Republican
Popular vote	140,465	20,019
Percentage	87.5%	12.5%
State assemblymember before election
Jessica Caloza
Democratic
State assemblymember after election
Jessica Caloza
Democratic

Incumbent Democrat Jessica Caloza was first elected in 2024 with 66.9% of the vote. Caloza is seeking re-election to her second term in office.

=== Candidates ===
==== Declared ====
- Andrea Lee Anderson (Republican)
- Jessica Caloza (Democratic), incumbent state assemblymember

=== Endorsements ===
Jessica Caloza (D)

Political parties

- California Democratic Party

=== Results ===
2026 California's 52nd State Assembly district election
Primary election
Party	Candidate	Votes	%
Democratic	Jessica Caloza (incumbent)	95,743	85.8
Republican	Andrea Lee Anderson	15,895	14.2
Total votes		111,638	100.0
General election
Democratic	Jessica Caloza (incumbent)	140,465	87.5
Republican	Andrea Lee Anderson	20,019	12.5
Total votes		160,484	100.0
Democratic hold			

== District 53 ==
2026 California's 53rd State Assembly district election
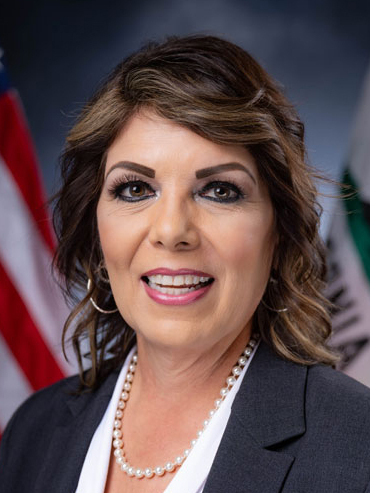

Candidate	Michelle Rodriguez	Rafaela Romero
Party	Democratic	Republican
Popular vote	86,720	39,292
Percentage	68.8%	31.2%
State assemblymember before election
Michelle Rodriguez
Democratic
State assemblymember after election
Michelle Rodriguez
Democratic

Incumbent Democrat Michelle Rodriguez was first elected in 2024 with 57.6% of the vote. Rodriguez is seeking re-election to her second term in office.

=== Candidates ===
==== Declared ====
- Michelle Rodriguez (Democratic), incumbent state assemblymember
- Rafaela Romero (Republican), special education aide

=== Endorsements ===
Michelle Rodriguez (D)

Political parties

- California Democratic Party

=== Results ===
2026 California's 53rd State Assembly district election
Primary election
Party	Candidate	Votes	%
Democratic	Michelle Rodriguez (incumbent)	45,994	62.3
Republican	Rafaela Romero	27,823	37.7
Total votes		73,817	100.0
General election
Democratic	Michelle Rodriguez (incumbent)	86,720	68.8
Republican	Rafaela Romero	39,292	31.2
Total votes		126,012	100.0
Democratic hold			

== District 54 ==
2026 California's 54th State Assembly district election
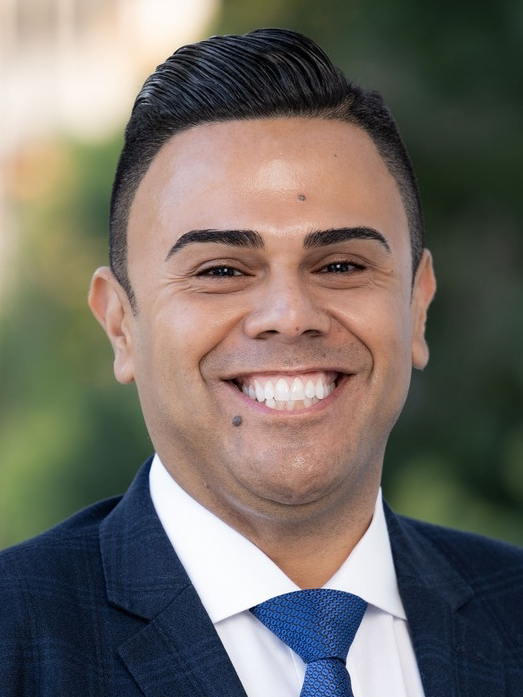

Candidate	Mark Gonzalez	Alexandra Briseno
Party	Democratic	Republican
Popular vote	85,512	16,858
Percentage	83.5%	16.5%
State assemblymember before election
Mark Gonzalez
Democratic
State assemblymember after election
Mark Gonzalez
Democratic

Incumbent Democrat Mark Gonzalez was re-elected in 2024 with 56.3% of the vote. Gonzalez is seeking re-election and is running unopposed for his second term in office.

=== Candidates ===
==== Declared ====
- Mark Gonzalez (Democratic), incumbent state assemblymember

=== Endorsements ===
Mark Gonzalez (D)

Political parties

- California Democratic Party

=== Results ===
2026 California's 54th State Assembly district election
Primary election
Party	Candidate	Votes	%
Democratic	Mark Gonzalez (incumbent)	48,751	99.7
Republican	Alexandra Briseno (write-in)	137	0.3
Total votes		48,888	100.0
General election
Democratic	Mark Gonzalez (incumbent)	85,512	83.5
Republican	Alexandra Briseno	16,858	16.5
Total votes		102,370	100.0
Democratic hold			

== District 55 ==
2026 California's 55th State Assembly district election
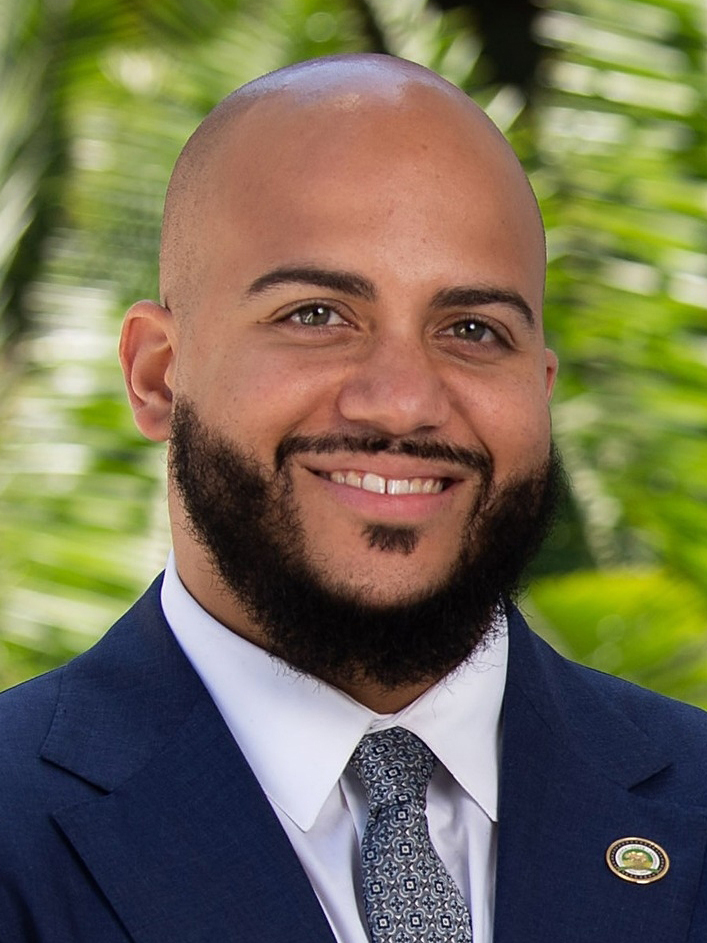

Candidate	Isaac Bryan	Ashley Brown
Party	Democratic	Democratic
Popular vote	102,319	52,047
Percentage	66.3%	33.7%
State assemblymember before election
Isaac Bryan
Democratic
State assemblymember after election
Isaac Bryan
Democratic

Incumbent Democrat Isaac Bryan was re-elected in 2024 with 80.7% of the vote. Bryan is seeking re-election to his third full term in office.

=== Candidates ===
==== Declared ====
- Ashley M. Brown (Democratic), social worker
- Isaac Bryan (Democratic), incumbent state assemblymember
- William "Billion" Campbell (No party preference)
- Keith Cascio (Republican), software engineer

=== Endorsements ===
Isaac Bryan (D)

Political parties

- California Democratic Party
- California Working Families Party
Keith Cascio (R)

Political parties

- California Republican Party

=== Results ===
2026 California's 55th State Assembly district election
Primary election
Party	Candidate	Votes	%
Democratic	Isaac Bryan (incumbent)	79,396	64.6
Democratic	Ashley Brown	23,242	18.9
Republican	Keith Cascio	18,847	15.3
No party preference	William "Billion" Campbell	1,508	1.2
Total votes		122,993	100.0
General election
Democratic	Isaac Bryan (incumbent)	102,319	66.3
Democratic	Ashley Brown	52,047	33.7
Total votes		154,366	100.0
Democratic hold			

== District 56 ==
2026 California's 56th State Assembly district election
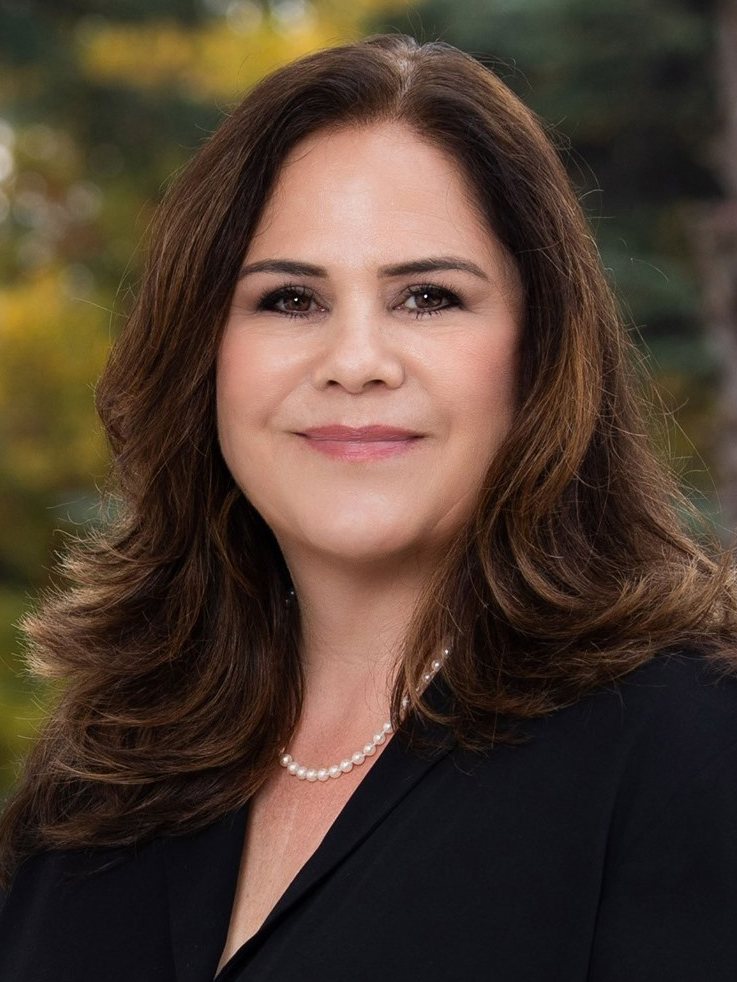

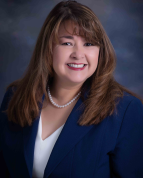
Candidate	Lisa Calderon	Jessica Martinez
Party	Democratic	Republican
Popular vote	101,495	46,836
Percentage	68.4%	31.6%
State assemblymember before election
Lisa Calderon
Democratic
State assemblymember after election
Lisa Calderon
Democratic

Incumbent Democrat Lisa Calderon was re-elected in 2024 with 56.7% of the vote. Calderon is seeking re-election to her fourth term in office.

=== Candidates ===
==== Declared ====
- Lisa Calderon (Democratic), incumbent state assemblymember
- Jessica Martinez (Republican), former Whittier city councilor (2020–2024), perennial candidate

=== Endorsements ===
Lisa Calderon (D)

Political parties

- California Democratic Party
Jessica Martinez (R)

Political parties

- California Republican Party

=== Results ===
2026 California's 56th State Assembly district election
Primary election
Party	Candidate	Votes	%
Democratic	Lisa Calderon (incumbent)	60,224	64.1
Republican	Jessica Martinez	33,711	35.9
Total votes		93,935	100.0
General election
Democratic	Lisa Calderon (incumbent)	101,495	68.4
Republican	Jessica Martinez	46,836	31.6
Total votes		148,331	100.0
Democratic hold			

== District 57 ==
2026 California's 57th State Assembly district election
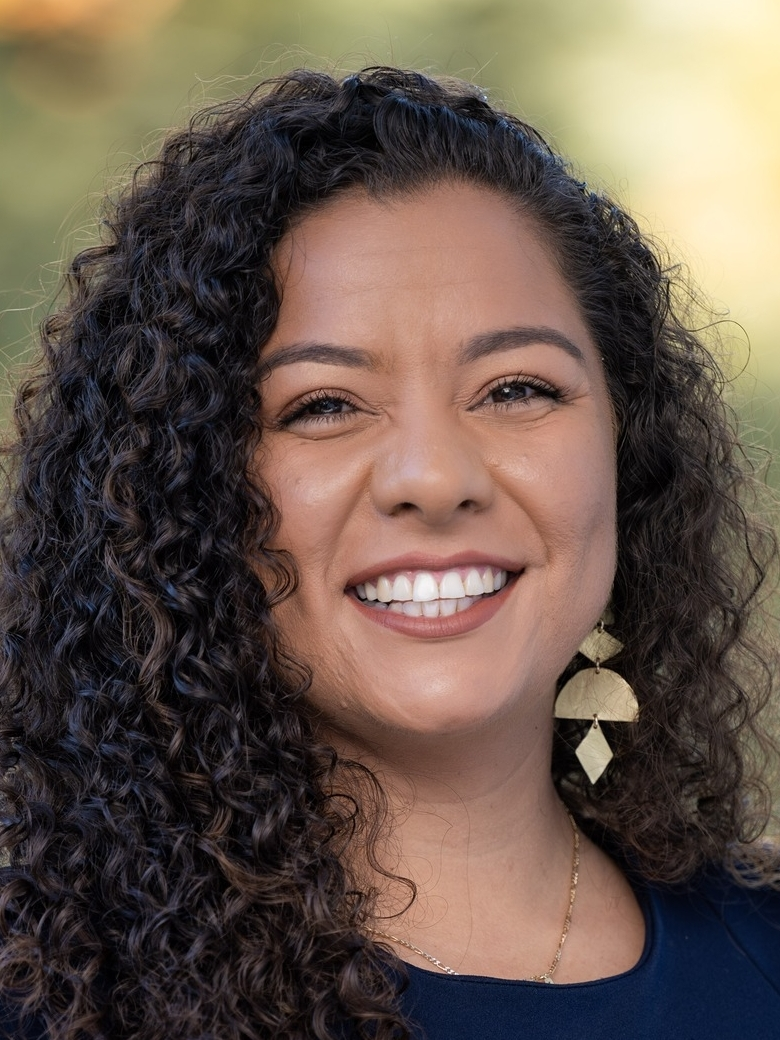

Candidate	Sade Elhawary	Constance Jewel Menzies
Party	Democratic	Republican
Popular vote	76,915	8,743
Percentage	89.8%	10.2%
State assemblymember before election
Sade Elhawary
Democratic
State assemblymember after election
Sade Elhawary
Democratic

Incumbent Democrat Sade Elhawary was first elected in 2024 with 61.1% of the vote. Elhawary is seeking re-election to her second term in office.

=== Candidates ===
==== Declared ====
- Sade Elhawary (Democratic), incumbent state assemblymember
- Constance Jewel Menzies (Republican)

=== Endorsements ===
Sade Elhawary (D)

Political parties

- California Democratic Party
- California Working Families Party

=== Results ===
2026 California's 57th State Assembly district election
Primary election
Party	Candidate	Votes	%
Democratic	Sade Elhawary (incumbent)	40,160	85.7
Republican	Constance Menzies	6,701	14.3
Total votes		46,861	100.0
General election
Democratic	Sade Elhawary (incumbent)	76,915	89.8
Republican	Constance Menzies	8,743	10.2
Total votes		85,658	100.0
Democratic hold			

== District 58 ==
2026 California's 58th State Assembly district election
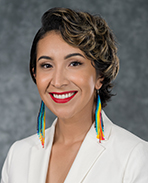

Candidate	Clarissa Cervantes	Leticia Castillo
Party	Democratic	Republican
Popular vote	83,629	47,005
Percentage	64.0%	36.0%
State assemblymember before election
Leticia Castillo
Republican
State assemblymember after election
Clarissa Cervantes
Democratic

Incumbent Republican Leticia Castillo was first elected in 2024 with 50.2% of the vote in a major upset. Castillo is seeking re-election to her second term in office. The challenger, Riverside City Councilwoman Clarissa Cervantes, is seeking a rematch of the 2024 election.

=== Candidates ===
==== Declared ====
- Leticia Castillo (Republican), incumbent state assemblywoman
- Clarissa Cervantes (Democratic), Riverside city councilor and runner-up for this district in 2024

==== Withdrawn ====
- Paco Licea (Democratic), real estate broker

=== Endorsements ===
Letiia Castillo (R)

Political parties

- California Republican Party
Clarissa Cervantes (D)

Political parties

- California Democratic Party
- California Working Families Party

=== Post-primary endorsements ===
Letiia Castillo (R)

Newspapers

- The Press-Enterprise

=== Results ===
2026 California's 58th State Assembly district election
Primary election
Party	Candidate	Votes	%
Democratic	Clarissa Cervantes	45,598	54.5
Republican	Leticia Castillo (incumbent)	38,002	45.5
Total votes		83,600	100.0
General election
Democratic	Clarissa Cervantes	83,629	64.0
Republican	Leticia Castillo (incumbent)	47,005	36.0
Total votes		130,634	100.0
Democratic gain from Republican			

== District 59 ==
2026 California's 59th State Assembly district election
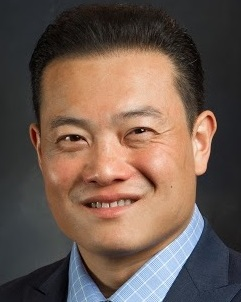

Candidate	Phillip Chen	Victor Hernandez
Party	Republican	Green
Popular vote	109,679	74,575
Percentage	59.5%	40.5%
State assemblymember before election
Phillip Chen
Republican
State assemblymember after election
Phillip Chen
Republican

Incumbent Republican Phillip Chen was re-elected in 2024 with 60.5% of the vote. Chen is seeking re-election to his sixth and final term in office.

=== Candidates ===
==== Declared ====
- Victor Hernandez (Green), account sales manager
- Phillip Chen (Republican), incumbent state assemblymember

==== Endorsements ====
Phillip Chen (R)

Political parties

- California Republican Party

=== Results ===
2026 California's 59th State Assembly district election
Primary election
Party	Candidate	Votes	%
Republican	Phillip Chen (incumbent)	83,929	66.3
Green	Victor Hernandez	42,685	33.7
Total votes		126,614	100.0
General election
Republican	Phillip Chen (incumbent)	109,679	59.5
Green	Victor Hernandez	74,575	40.5
Total votes		184,254	100.0
Republican hold			

== District 60 ==
2026 California's 60th State Assembly district election
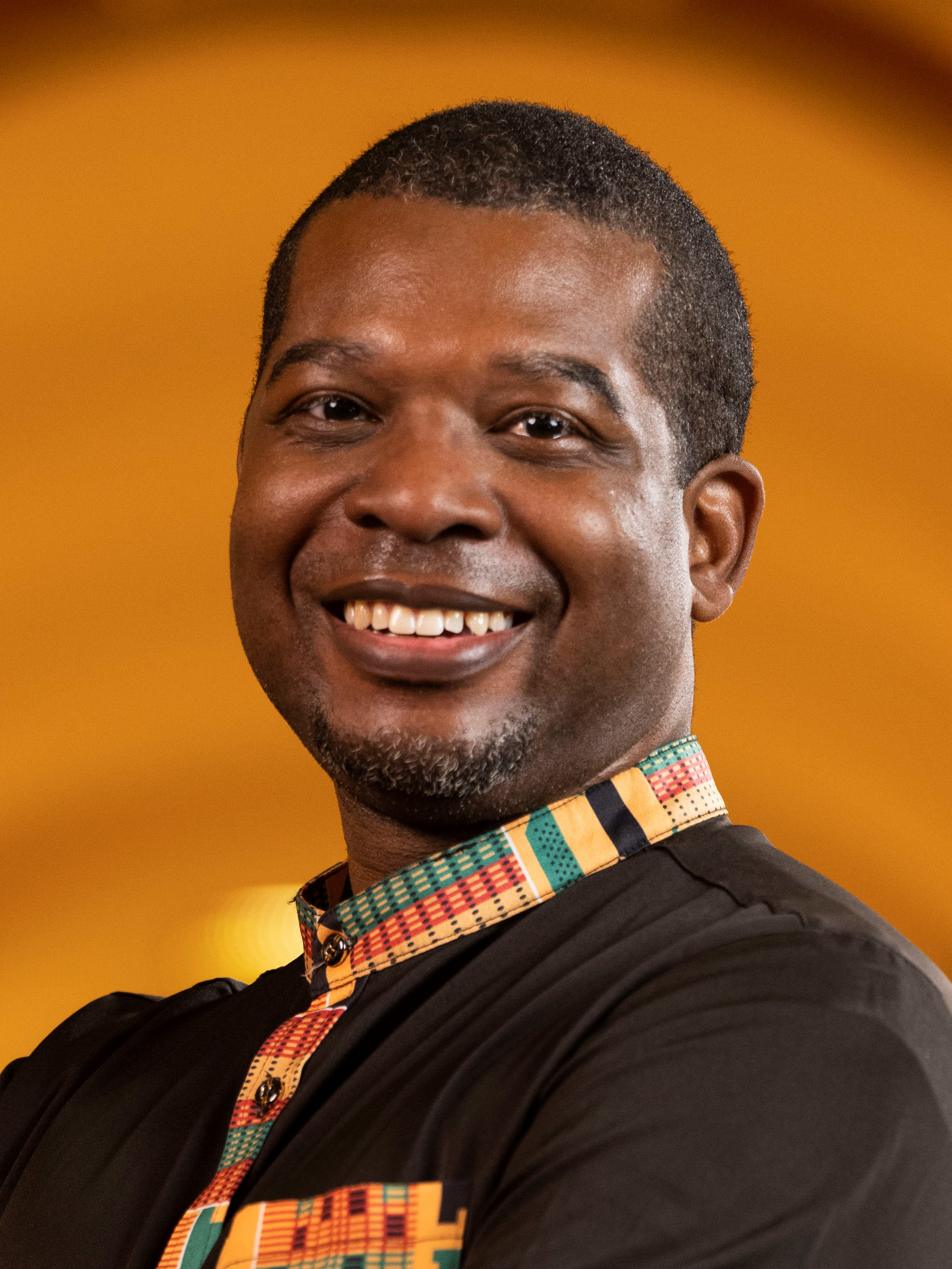

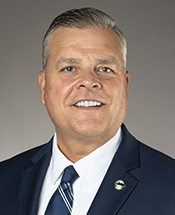
Candidate	Corey Jackson	Ed Delgado
Party	Democratic	Republican
Popular vote	77,212	34,345
Percentage	69.2%	30.8%
State assemblymember before election
Corey Jackson
Democratic
State assemblymember after election
Corey Jackson
Democratic

Incumbent Democrat Corey Jackson was re-elected in 2024 with 55.4% of the vote. Jackson is seeking re-election to his third term in office.

=== Candidates ===
==== Declared ====
- Ed Delgado (Republican), Moreno Valley city councilor
- Ron Edwards (Republican), business owner and runner-up for this district in 2024
- Corey Jackson (Democratic), incumbent state assemblymember

=== Endorsements ===
Corey Jackson (D)

Organizations

- Courage California

Political parties

- California Democratic Party
- California Working Families Party

=== Results ===
2026 California's 60th State Assembly district election
Primary election
Party	Candidate	Votes	%
Democratic	Corey Jackson (incumbent)	40,189	59.8
Republican	Ed Delgado	16,898	25.1
Republican	Ron Edwards	10,119	15.1
Total votes		67,206	100.0
General election
Democratic	Corey Jackson (incumbent)	77,212	69.2
Republican	Ed Delgado	34,345	30.8
Total votes		111,557	100.0
Democratic hold			

== District 61 ==
2026 California's 61st State Assembly district election
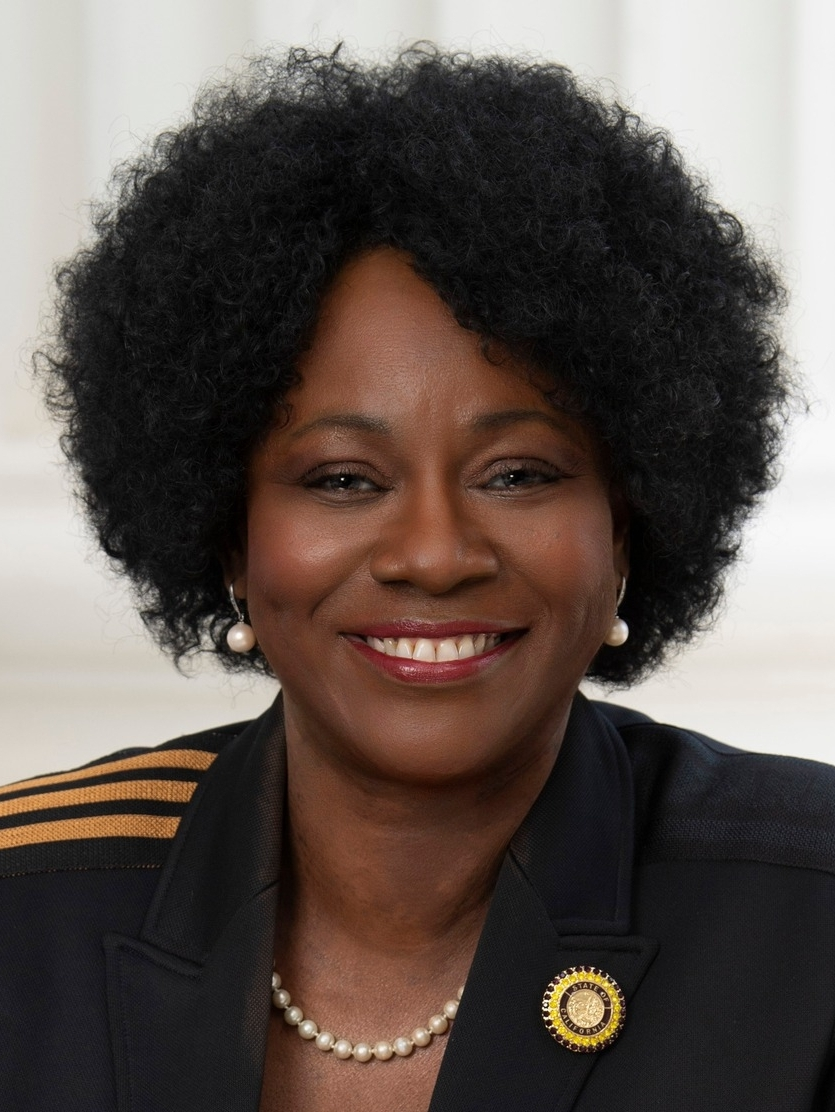

Candidate	Tina McKinnor	Brian Lockwood
Party	Democratic	Republican
Popular vote	120,404	22,076
Percentage	84.5%	15.5%
State assemblymember before election
Tina McKinnor
Democratic
State assemblymember after election
Tina McKinnor
Democratic

Incumbent Democrat Tina McKinnor was re-elected in 2024 with 76.5% of the vote. McKinnor is seeking re-election and is running unopposed for her third full term in office.

=== Candidates ===
==== Declared ====
- Tina McKinnor (Democratic), incumbent state assemblymember

=== Endorsements ===
Tina McKinnor (D)

Political parties

- California Democratic Party
- California Working Families Party

=== Results ===
2026 California's 61st State Assembly district election
Primary election
Party	Candidate	Votes	%
Democratic	Tina McKinnor (incumbent)	79,047	98.6
Republican	Brian Lockwood (write-in)	1,104	1.4
Total votes		80,151	100.0
General election
Democratic	Tina McKinnor (incumbent)	120,404	84.5
Republican	Brian Lockwood	22,076	15.5
Total votes		142,480	100.0
Democratic hold			

== District 62 ==
2026 California's 62nd State Assembly district election
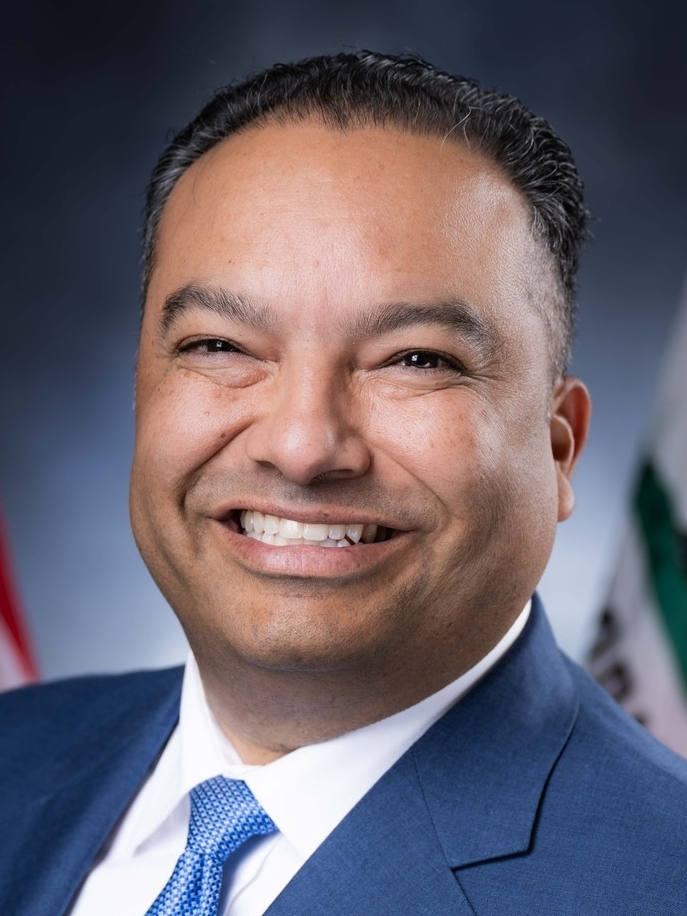

Candidate	José Solache	Paul Irving Jones
Party	Democratic	Republican
Popular vote	92,219	25,926
Percentage	78.1%	21.9%
State assemblymember before election
José Solache
Democratic
State assemblymember after election
José Solache
Democratic

Incumbent Democrat Jose Solache was first elected in 2024 with 66.0% of the vote. Solache is seeking re-election to his second term in office.

=== Candidates ===
==== Declared ====
- Paul Irving Jones (Republican), U.S. Marine veteran and runner-up for this district in 2024
- José Solache (Democratic), incumbent state assemblymember

=== Endorsements ===
Paul Irving Jones (R)

Political parties

- California Republican Party
Jose Solache (D)

Political parties

- California Democratic Party

=== Results ===
2026 California's 62nd State Assembly district election
Primary election
Party	Candidate	Votes	%
Democratic	José Solache (incumbent)	51,049	73.1
Republican	Paul Irving Jones	18,767	26.9
Total votes		69,816	100.0
General election
Democratic	José Solache (incumbent)	92,219	78.1
Republican	Paul Irving Jones	25,926	21.9
Total votes		118,145	100.0
Democratic hold			

== District 63 ==
2026 California's 63rd State Assembly district election
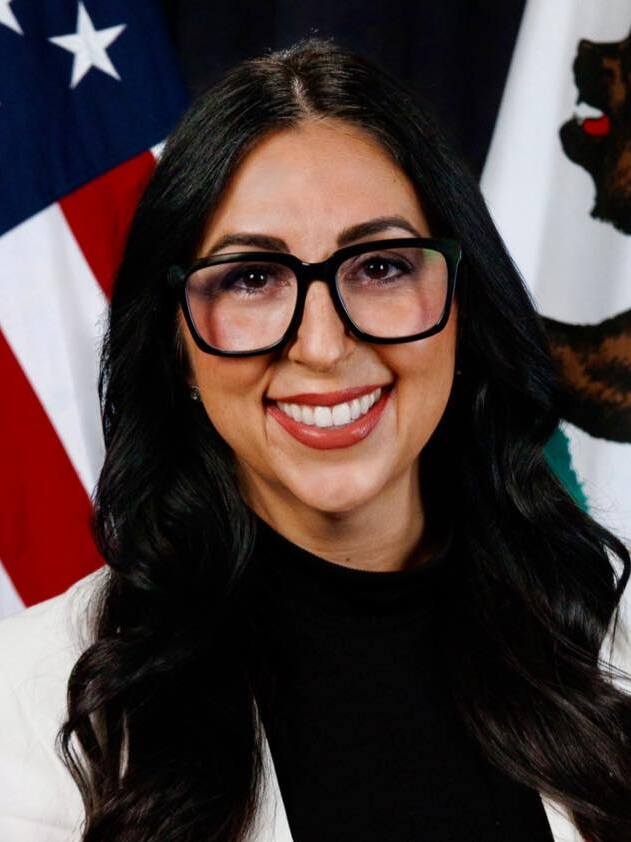

Candidate	Natasha Johnson	Kevin Akin
Party	Republican	Peace and Freedom
Popular vote	91,448	71,689
Percentage	56.1%	43.9%
State assemblymember before election
Natasha Johnson
Republican
State assemblymember after election
Natasha Johnson
Republican

Incumbent Republican Natasha Johnson was elected with 53.5% in the 2025 special election resulting from the resignation of Bill Essayli after his appointment as U.S. Attorney for the Central District of California by Attorney General Pam Bondi on April 1, 2025.

Johnson is seeking re-election for her first full term in office.

=== Candidates ===
==== Declared ====
- Natasha Johnson (Republican), incumbent state assemblymember
- Kevin Akin (Peace & Freedom) (write-in)

==== Endorsements ====
Natasha Johnson (R)

Political parties

- California Republican Party

=== Results ===
2026 California's 63rd State Assembly district election
Primary election
Party	Candidate	Votes	%
Republican	Natasha Johnson (incumbent)	80,160	99.3
Peace and Freedom	Kevin Akin (write-in)	575	0.7
Total votes		80,735	100.0
General election
Republican	Natasha Johnson (incumbent)	91,448	56.1
Peace and Freedom	Kevin Akin	71,689	43.9
Total votes		163,137	100.0
Republican hold			

== District 64 ==
2026 California's 64th State Assembly district election
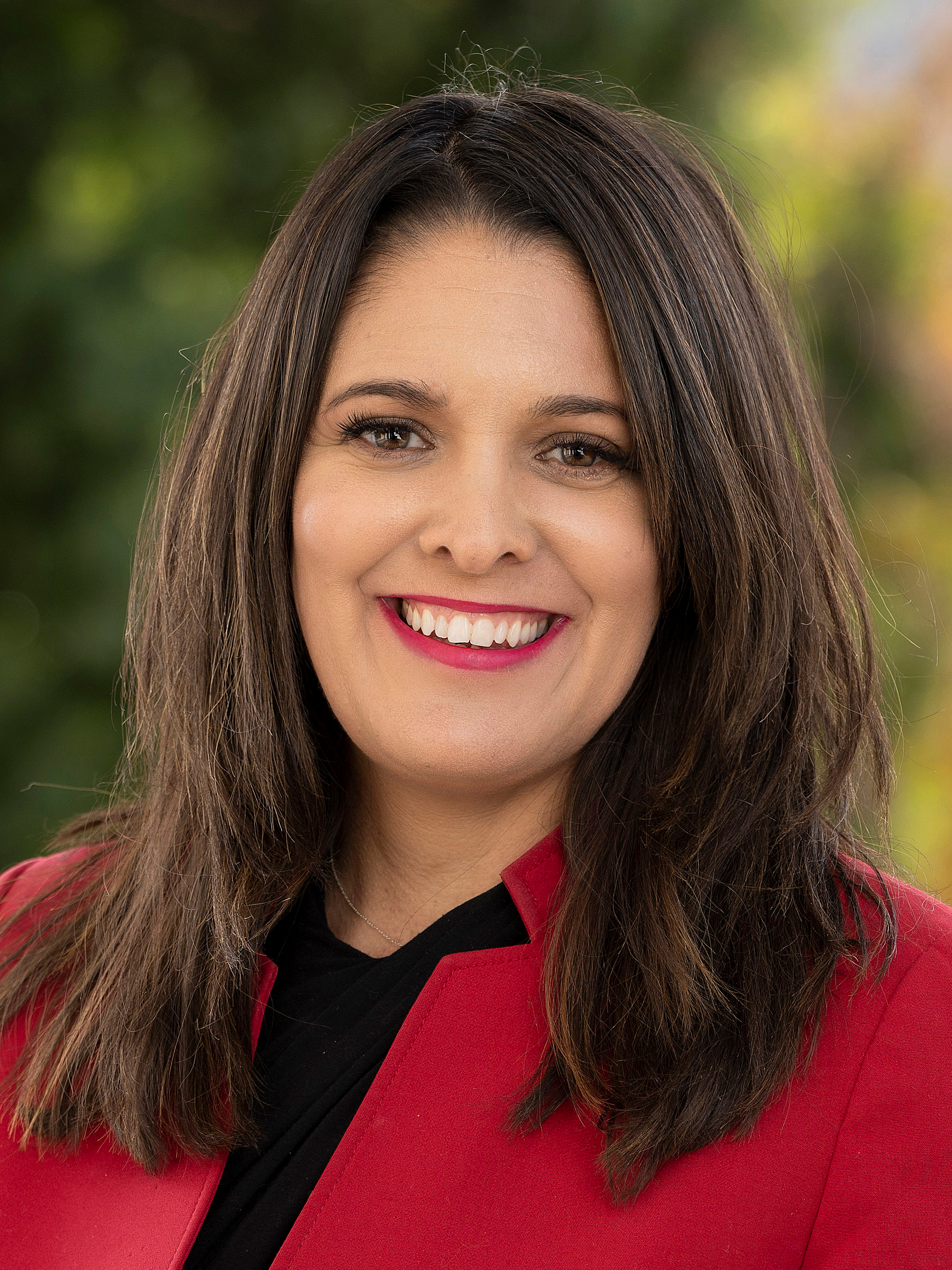

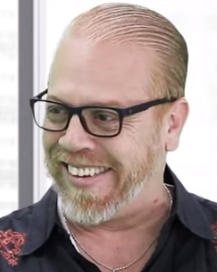
Candidate	Blanca Pacheco	Raul Ortiz Jr.
Party	Democratic	Republican
Popular vote	105,925	40,689
Percentage	72.3%	27.7%
State assemblymember before election
Blanca Pacheco
Democratic
State assemblymember after election
Blanca Pacheco
Democratic

Incumbent Democrat Blanca Pacheco was re-elected in 2024 with 62.5% of the vote. Pacheco is seeking re-election to her second term in office.

=== Candidates ===
==== Declared ====
- Raul Ortiz Jr. (Republican), perennial candidate
- Blanca Pacheco (Democratic), incumbent state assemblymember

=== Endorsements ===
Blanca Pacheco (D)

Political parties

- California Democratic Party

=== Results ===
2026 California's 64th State Assembly district election
Primary election
Party	Candidate	Votes	%
Democratic	Blanca Pacheco (incumbent)	58,939	66.5
Republican	Raul Ortiz Jr.	29,655	33.5
Total votes		88,594	100.0
General election
Democratic	Blanca Pacheco (incumbent)	105,925	72.3
Republican	Raul Ortiz Jr.	40,689	27.7
Total votes		146,614	100.0
Democratic hold			

== District 65 ==
2026 California's 65th State Assembly district election

Candidate	Ayanna Davis	Lydia Gutiérrez
Party	Democratic	Republican
Popular vote	96,526	20,806
Percentage	82.3%	17.7%
State assemblymember before election
Mike Gipson
Democratic
State assemblymember after election
Ayanna Davis
Democratic

Incumbent Democrat Mike Gipson was re-elected in 2024 with 70.9% of the vote. Gipson is term limited and running for the California State Board of Equalization.

=== Candidates ===
==== Declared ====
- Vinson Eugene Allen (Democratic), physician
- Ayanna Davis (Democratic), member of the Compton Unified School Board (2022–present)
- Lydia Gutiérrez (Republican), teacher
- Fatima Iqbal-Zubair (Democratic), chair of the California Democratic Party Progressive Caucus and runner-up for this district in 2020 and 2022
- Lamar Lyons (Democratic), president of San Pedro neighborhood council
- Magali Sanchez-Hall (Democratic), environmental activist

==== Withdrawn ====
- Myla Rahman (Democratic), district director for state senator Lola Smallwood-Cuevas and former Carson city clerk (2021) (running for U.S. House)

=== Endorsements ===
Ayanna Davis (D)

State legislators

- Mike Gipson, AD-65 (2014–present)
- Tina McKinnor, AD-61 (2022–present)

Political parties

- California Democratic Party
Fatima Iqbal-Zubair (D)

U.S. senators

- Bernie Sanders, Vermont (2007–present) (Independent)

State legislators

- Lena Gonzalez, majority leader of the California State Senate (2024–present) from SD-33 (2019–present)

Labor unions

- SEIU California

Organizations

- Courage California
- Our Revolution

Political parties

- California Working Families Party

=== Results ===
2026 California's 65th State Assembly district election
Primary election
Party	Candidate	Votes	%
Democratic	Ayanna Davis	33,514	46.3
Republican	Lydia Gutiérrez	13,940	19.2
Democratic	Fatima Iqbal-Zubair	13,123	18.1
Democratic	Magali Sanchez-Hall	5,666	7.8
Democratic	Lamar Lyons	3,769	5.2
Democratic	Vinson Allen	2,441	3.4
Total votes		72,453	100.0
General election
Democratic	Ayanna Davis	96,526	82.3
Republican	Lydia Gutiérrez	20,806	17.7
Total votes		117,332	100.0
Democratic hold			

== District 66 ==
2026 California's 66th State Assembly district election
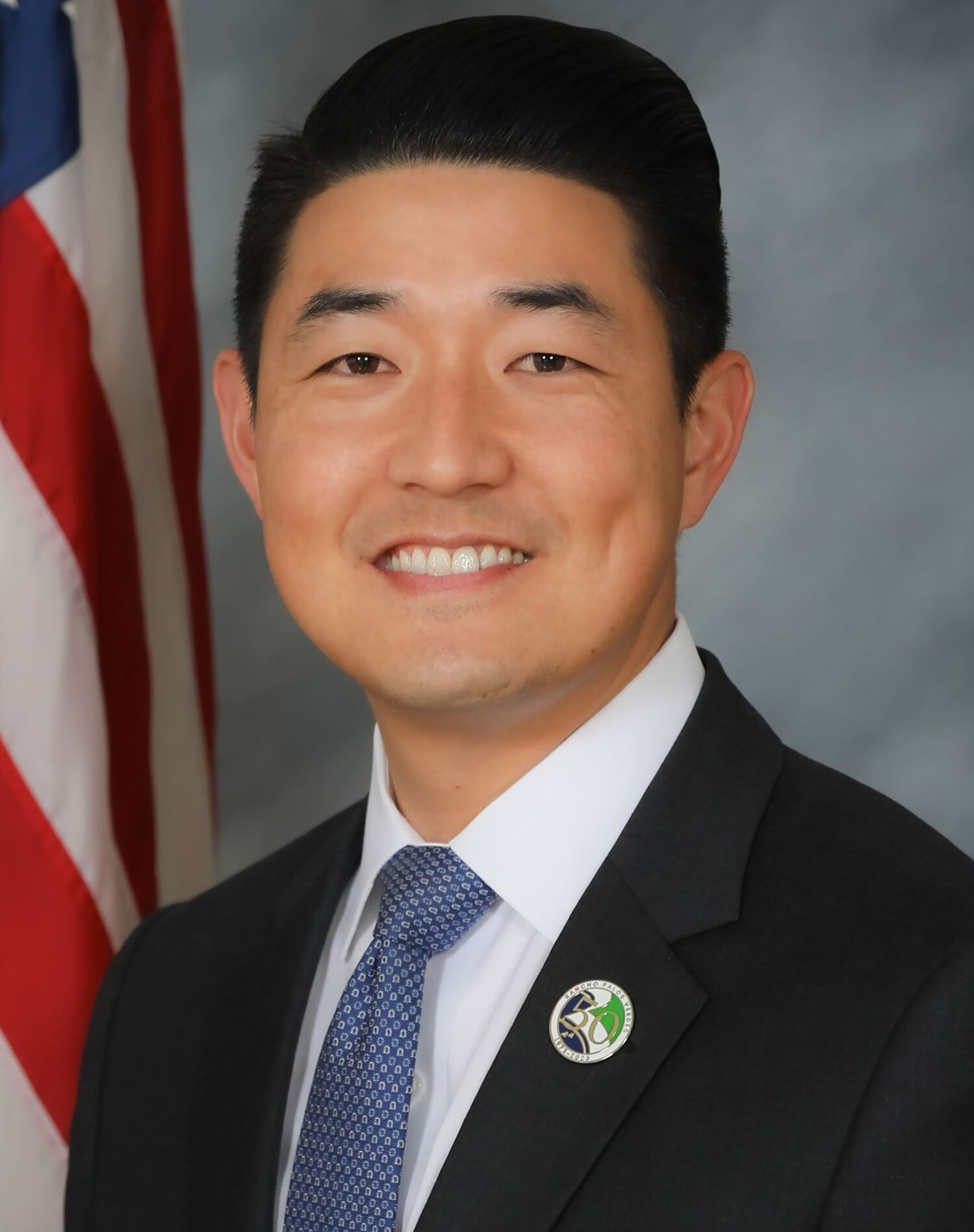

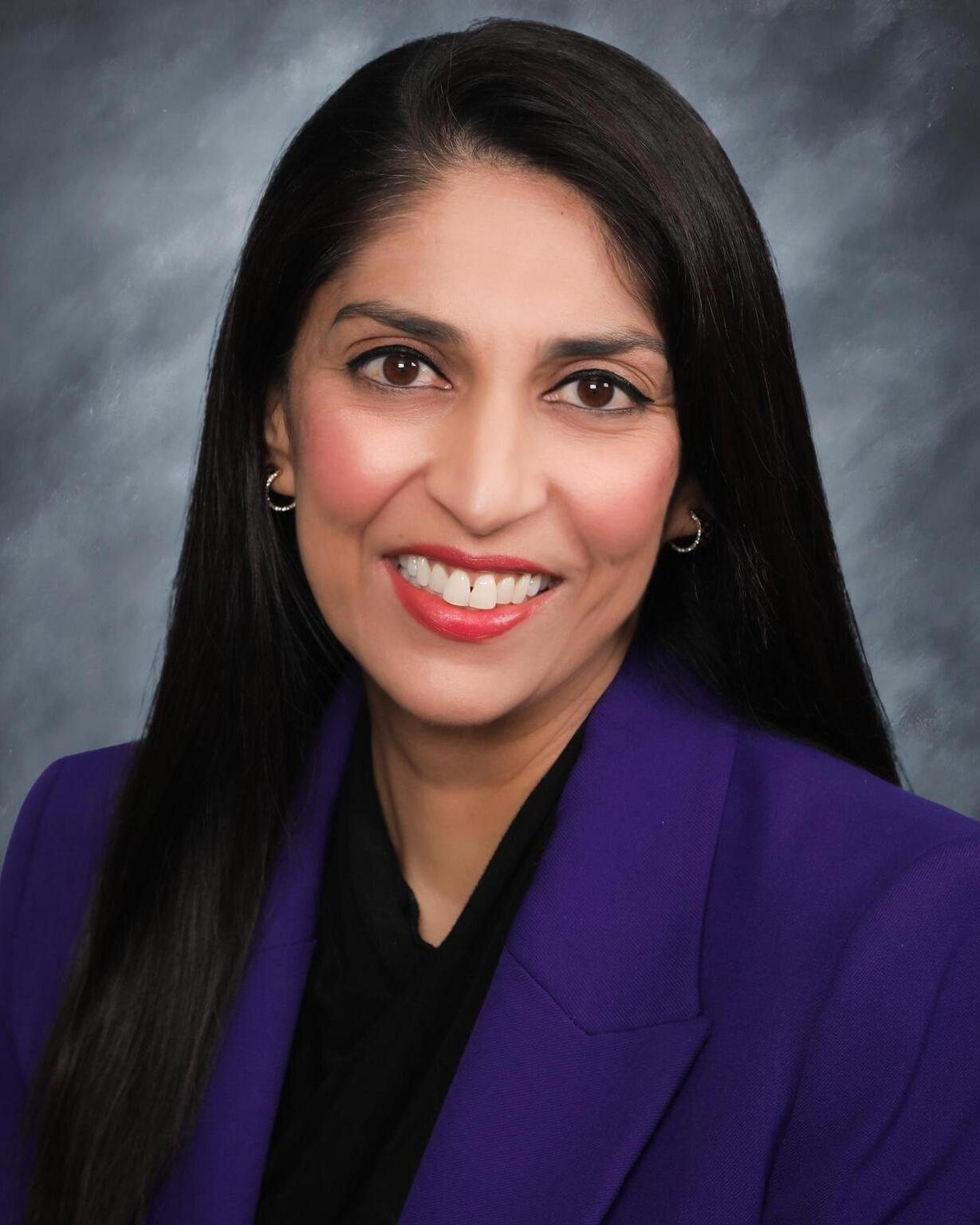
Candidate	Paul Seo	Sara Deen
Party	Democratic	Democratic
Popular vote	98,582	65,896
Percentage	59.9%	40.1%
State assemblymember before election
Al Muratsuchi
Democratic
State assemblymember after election
Paul Seo
Democratic

Incumbent Democrat Al Muratsuchi was re-elected to his sixth and final term in 2024 with 60.2% of the vote. Murtasuchi is term-limited and unsuccessfully ran for state Superintendent of Public Instruction.

=== Candidates ===
==== Declared ====
- George Barks (Republican), former Hermosa Beach city councilor, runner-up for this district in 2022 and 2024
- Sara Deen (Democratic), member of the Palos Verdes Peninsula Unified School Board
- Scott Houston (Democratic), West Basin Municipal Water District board member
- Jessica Zonia Maldonado (Republican), registered nurse
- Shannon Ruiz-Ross (Democratic), member of the Los Angeles County Beach Commission
- Paul Seo (Democratic), mayor of Rancho Palos Verdes

=== Endorsements ===
Paul Seo (D)

Labor unions

- Los Angeles County Federation of Labor
Declined to endorse

Political parties

- California Democratic Party

=== Results ===
2026 California's 66th State Assembly district election
Primary election
Party	Candidate	Votes	%
Democratic	Paul Seo	36,802	26.6
Democratic	Sara Deen	34,098	24.6
Republican	Jessica Maldonado	30,346	21.9
Republican	George Barks	22,057	15.9
Democratic	Scott Houston	7,685	5.5
Democratic	Shannon Ruiz-Ross	7,421	5.4
Total votes		138,409	100.0
General election
Democratic	Paul Seo	98,582	59.9
Democratic	Sara Deen	65,896	40.1
Total votes		164,478	100.0
Democratic hold			

== District 67 ==
2026 California's 67th State Assembly district election
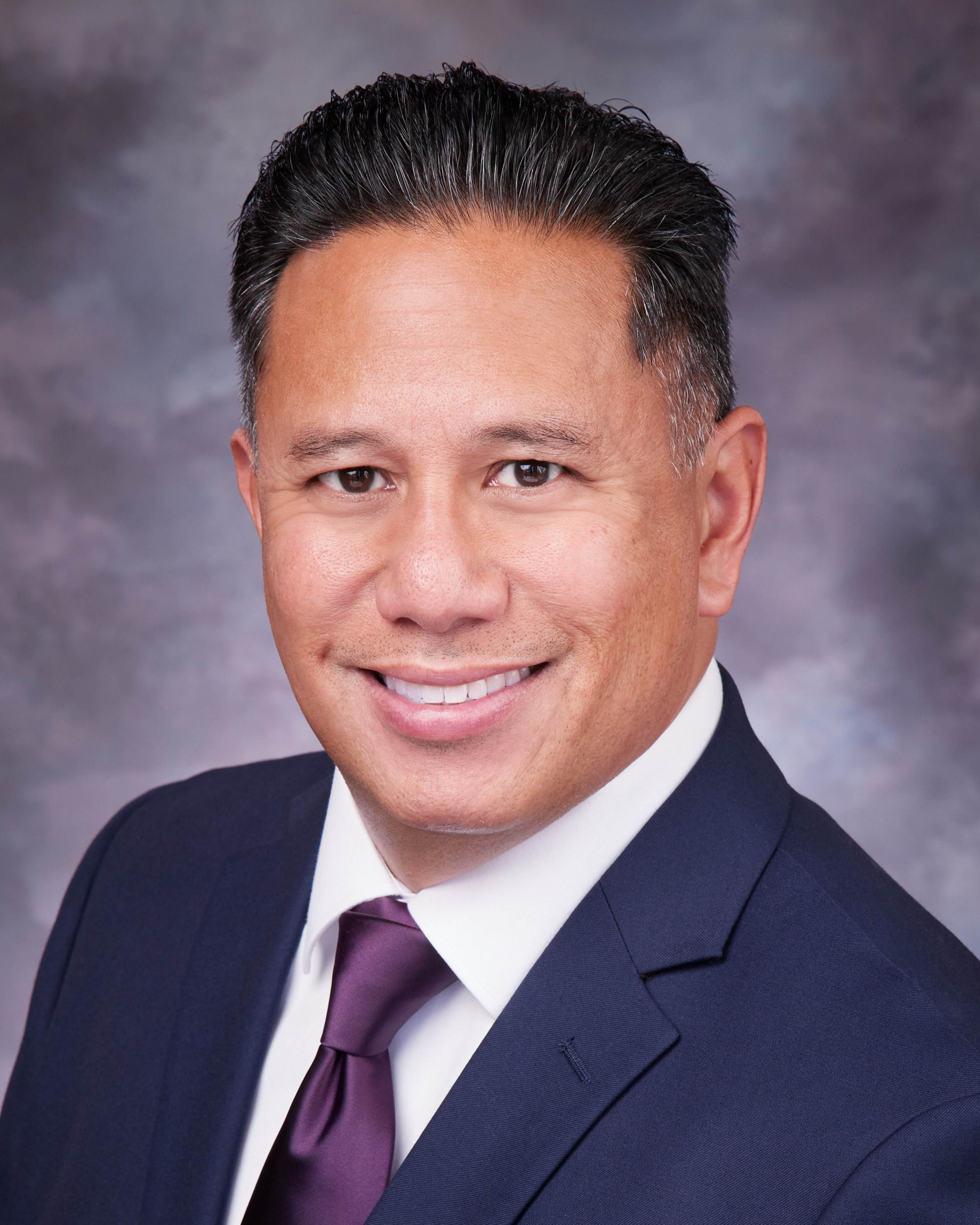

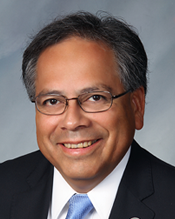
Candidate	Mark Pulido	Paulo Morales
Party	Democratic	Republican
Popular vote	91,344	50,285
Percentage	64.5%	35.5%
State assemblymember before election
Sharon Quirk-Silva
Democratic
State assemblymember after election
Mark Pulido
Democratic

Incumbent Democrat Sharon Quirk-Silva was re-elected to her sixth and final term in 2024 with 56.8% of the vote. Quirk-Silva is term-limited and unable to run for re-election.

Cerritos City Councilman Mark Pulido, who placed second in the June 3 primary behind Cypress City Councilman Paulo Morales, benefited from $3.5 million spent by three Super PACs as of May 14 (nineteen days prior primary date). One Super PAC, named Grow California and funded by crypto billionaire Chris Larsen and venture capitalist Tim Draper, had spent $1.6 million in support of Pulido. A second Super PAC, named California Leads and funded by Google and Meta, had spent $1.3 million in support of Pulido. A third Super PAC, funded by Airbnb, spent $675 thousand in support of Pulido. Paulo Morales, who received the most votes in the primary, had spent only $25 thousand as of the same point in time.

=== Candidates ===
==== Declared ====
- Adrian Ayub (Republican), entrepreneur
- Ada Briceño (Democratic), co-president of UNITE HERE Local 11 and former chair of the Orange County Democratic Party (2019–2025)
- Paul Gonzales (Democratic), former chairman of the Buena Park Planning Commission
- Paulo Morales (Republican), Cypress city councilor (2014–2022)
- Mark Pulido (Democratic), Cerritos city councilor (2011–2020, 2025–present)
- Ali Sajjad Taj (Democratic), Artesia city councilor (2013–present)

=== Endorsements ===
Ada Briceño (D)

U.S. senators

- Bernie Sanders, Vermont (2007–present) (Independent)

U.S. representatives

- Derek Tran, CA-45 (2025–present) (co-endorsement with Pulido)
- Ro Khanna, CA-17 (2017–present)
- Jimmy Gomez, CA-34 (2017–present)
- Katie Porter, former CA-47 (2023–2025) and CA-45 (2019–2023)

Statewide officials

- Eleni Kounalakis, lieutenant governor of California (2019–present)
- Fiona Ma, state treasurer of California (2019–present) (co-endorsement with Pulido and Taj)
- Malia Cohen, state controller of California (2023–present)
- Tony Thurmond, superintendent of public instruction of California (2019–present)

State legislators

- Jesse Arreguín, SD-7 (2024–present)
- Scott Wiener, SD-11 (2016–present)
- María Elena Durazo, SD-26 (2018–present)
- Lola Smallwood-Cuevas, SD-28 (2022–present)
- Bob Archuleta, SD-30 (2018–present)
- Lena Gonzalez, SD-33 (2019–present)
- Liz Ortega, AD-20 (2022–present)
- Matt Haney, AD-17 (2022–present)
- Pilar Schiavo, AD-40 (2022–present)
- John Harabedian, AD-41 (2024–present)
- Celeste Rodriguez, AD-43 (2024–present)
- Rick Chavez Zbur, AD-51 (2022–present)
- Sade Elhawary, AD-57 (2024–present)
- Avelino Valencia, AD-68 (2022–present)
- Joe Dunn, former SD-34 (1998–2006)
- Chris Holden, former AD-20 (2012–2024)

Municipal officials

- Vicente Sarmiento, Orange County supervisor (2023–present)
- Hilda Solis, Los Angeles County supervisor (2014–present)

Labor unions

- National Union of Healthcare Workers
- Teamsters Joint Council 42
- UNITE HERE California State Council, Locals 2, 11, 19 and 30
- United Auto Workers Region 6
- AFSCME Local 3299
- International Longshore and Warehouse Union Locals 13 and 63
- ILWU Foremen’s Union Local 94
- United Steelworkers Local 675
- United Electrical, Radio, and Machine Workers of America Western Region
- Transportation Communications Union Local 1315
- United Food and Commercial Workers Local 324
- United Nurses Associations of California/Union of Health Care Professionals

Organizations

- Center for Biological Diversity Action Fund
- Courage California

Political parties

- California Democratic Party
- California Working Families Party
Mark Pulido (D)

U.S. representatives

- Derek Tran, CA-45 (2025–present) (co-endorsement with Briceño)
- Dave Min, CA-47 (2025–present)
- Alan Lowenthal, former CA-47 (2013–2023)

Statewide officials

- Rob Bonta, attorney general of California (2021–present)
- Fiona Ma, state treasurer of California (2019–present) (co-endorsement with Briceño and Taj)

State legislators

- Mia Bonta, AD-18 (2021–present)
- Josh Lowenthal, AD-69 (2022–present)
- Al Muratsuchi, AD-66 (2012–2014, 2016–present)
- Anthony Rendon, former speaker of the California State Assembly (2016–2023) from AD-62 (2012–2024)

Labor unions

- LA/OC Building Trades Council
- IBEW Local 47
- LiUNA Locals 300, 652, and 1309
- UA Local 250 Steamfitters and Pipefitters
Ali Sajjad Taj (D)

U.S. senators

- Adam Schiff, California (2024–present)

U.S. representatives

- Linda Sanchez, CA-47 (2025–present)
- Derek Tran, CA-45 (2025–present)
- Norma Torres, CA-35 (2015–present)
- Loretta Sanchez, former CA-46 (1997–2017)

Statewide officials

- Fiona Ma, state treasurer of California (2019–present) (co-endorsement with Briceño and Pulido)

State legislators

- Bob Archuleta, SD-30 (2018–present)
- Jasmeet Bains, AD-35 (2022–present)
- Blanca Pacheco, AD-64 (2022–present)
- Mike Gipson, AD-65 (2014–present)
- Sharon Quirk-Silva, AD-67 (2016–present)
- Cottie Petrie-Norris, AD-73 (2018–present)
- Josh Newman, former SD-29 (2016–2018, 2020–2024)

Municipal officials

- Janice Hahn, Los Angeles County supervisor (2016–present)
- Holly Mitchell, Los Angeles County supervisor (2020–present)

=== Results ===
2026 California's 67th State Assembly district election
Primary election
Party	Candidate	Votes	%
Republican	Paulo Morales	28,372	31.6
Democratic	Mark Pulido	23,236	25.9
Democratic	Ada Briceño	21,241	23.7
Democratic	Ali Taj	6,967	7.8
Republican	Adrian Ayub	5,492	6.1
Democratic	Paul Gonzales	4,498	5.0
Total votes		89,806	100.0
General election
Democratic	Mark Pulido	91,344	64.5
Republican	Paulo Morales	50,285	35.5
Total votes		141,629	100.0
Democratic hold			

== District 68 ==
2026 California's 68th State Assembly district election
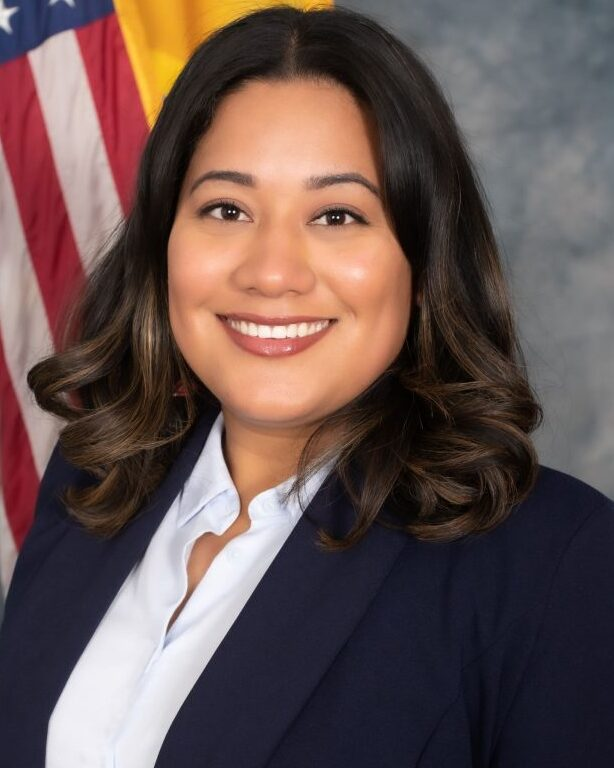

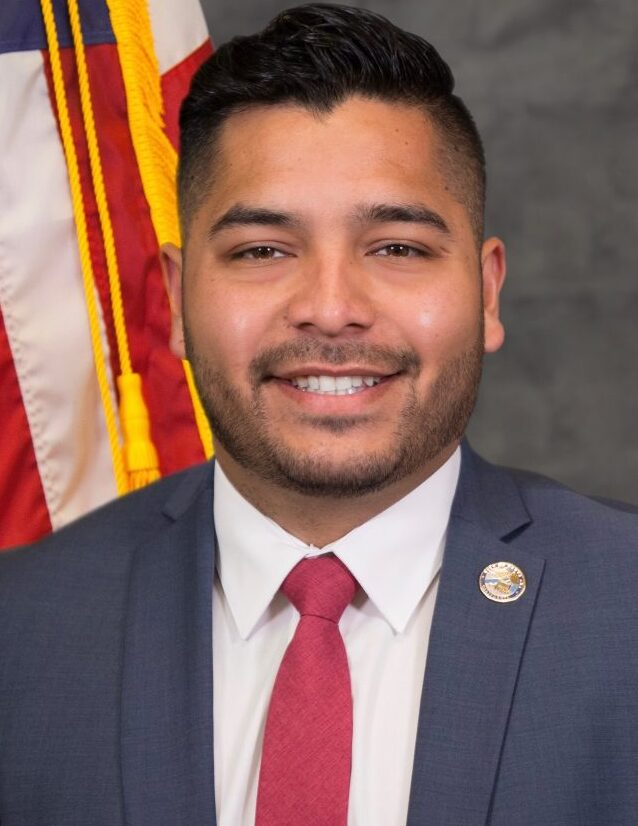
Candidate	Jessie Lopez	David Penaloza
Party	Democratic	Democratic
Popular vote	58,498	53,210
Percentage	52.4%	47.6%
- Lopez: 30–40% Penaloza: 30–40% Ruiz: 40–50%
State assemblymember before election
Avelino Valencia
Democratic
State assemblymember after election
Jessie Lopez
Democratic

Incumbent Democrat Avelino Valencia was re-elected in 2024 with 63.7% of the vote. Soria has declined to seek a third term in office, instead seeking to run for the state senate.

=== Candidates ===
==== Declared ====
- Jessie Lopez (Democratic), Santa Ana city councilor
- David Peñaloza (Democratic), Santa Ana city councilor
- Mayra Ruiz (Republican), small business owner
- Shannon Wingfield (Democratic), Juaneño Band of Mission Indians Nation tribal council secretary

==== Withdrawn ====
- Johnathan Ryan Hernandez (Democratic), Santa Ana city councilor

==== Declined ====
- Avelino Valencia (Democratic), incumbent assemblymember (running for state senate, endorsed Peñaloza)

=== Endorsements ===
Jessie Lopez (D)

U.S. senators

- Bernie Sanders, Vermont (2007–present) (Independent)

U.S. representatives

- Derek Tran, CA-45 (2025–present)

State legislators

- Josh Newman, former SD-29 (2016–2018, 2020–2024)

Labor unions

- National Union of Healthcare Workers
- Sheet Metal Air Rail Transportation Local 17
- United Food and Commercial Workers (UFCW) Local 324

Organizations

- Center for Biological Diversity Action Fund
- Courage California

Political parties

- California Working Families Party
David Penaloza (D)

State legislators

- Robert Rivas, speaker of the California State Assembly (2023–present) from AD-29 (2018–present)
- Avelino Valencia, AD-68 (2022–present)

Political parties

- California Democratic Party
Mayra Ruiz (R)

Political parties

- California Republican Party

=== Results ===
2026 California's 68th State Assembly district election
Primary election
Party	Candidate	Votes	%
Democratic	David Penaloza	23,305	32.5
Democratic	Jessie Lopez	22,504	31.4
Republican	Mayra Ruiz	21,047	29.4
Democratic	Shannon Wingfield	4,757	6.6
Total votes		71,613	100.0
General election
Democratic	Jessie Lopez	58,498	52.4
Democratic	David Penaloza	53,210	47.6
Total votes		111,708	100.0
Democratic hold			

== District 69 ==
2026 California's 69th State Assembly district election
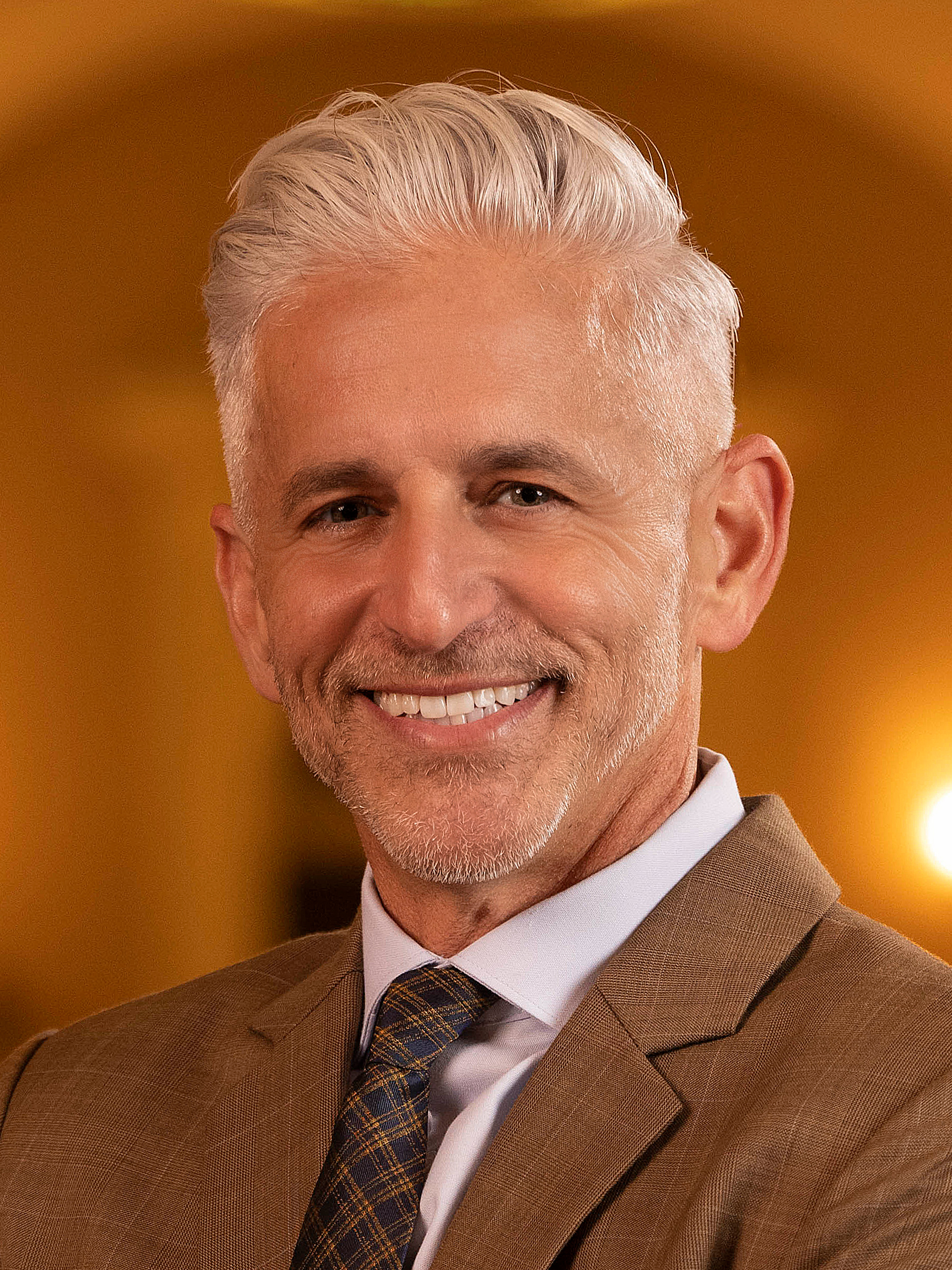

Candidate	Josh Lowenthal	Carolyn Essex
Party	Democratic	Democratic
Popular vote	90,117	47,010
Percentage	65.7%	34.3%
State assemblymember before election
Josh Lowenthal
Democratic
State assemblymember after election
Josh Lowenthal
Democratic

Incumbent Democrat and Speaker pro tempore of the Assembly Josh Lowenthal was re-elected in 2024 with 68.4% of the vote. Lowenthal is seeking re-election to his third term in office.

=== Candidates ===
==== Declared ====
- Carolyn Essex (Democratic), policy analyst
- Josh Lowenthal (Democratic), incumbent state assemblymember

=== Endorsements ===
Josh Lowenthal (D)

Political parties

- California Democratic Party

=== Results ===
2026 California's 69th State Assembly district election
Primary election
Party	Candidate	Votes	%
Democratic	Josh Lowenthal (incumbent)	63,944	68.6
Democratic	Carolyn Essex	26,596	28.5
Republican	Rachel Gunther (write-in)	2,736	2.9
Total votes		93,276	100.0
General election
Democratic	Josh Lowenthal (incumbent)	90,117	65.7
Democratic	Carolyn Essex	47,010	34.3
Total votes		129,876	100.0
Democratic hold			

== District 70 ==
2026 California's 70th State Assembly district election

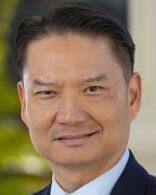
Candidate	Paula Swift	Tri Ta
Party	Democratic	Republican
Popular vote	78,897	72,475
Percentage	52.1%	47.9%
- Ta: 50–60% Swift: 50–60% 70–80% No votes: Swift: 50–60% 60–70% 70–80% Ta: 50–60% No votes
State assemblymember before election
Tri Ta
Republican
State assemblymember after election
Paula Swift
Democratic

Incumbent Republican Tri Ta was re-elected in 2024 with 54.7% of the vote. Ta is seeking re-election to his third term in office.

=== Candidates ===
==== Declared ====
- Paula Swift (Democratic), consultant (previously ran for CA-40)
- Tri Ta (Republican), incumbent state assemblymember

==== Withdrawn ====
- Tanya Cook (Democratic), event planner

=== Endorsements ===
Paula Swift (D)

Organizations

- Center for Biological Diversity Action Fund

Political parties

- California Democratic Party
Tri Ta (R)

Political parties

- California Republican Party

=== Results ===
2026 California's 70th State Assembly district election
Primary election
Party	Candidate	Votes	%
Republican	Tri Ta (incumbent)	52,758	53.8
Democratic	Paula Swift	45,348	46.2
Total votes		98,106	100.0
General election
Democratic	Paula Swift	78,897	52.1
Republican	Tri Ta (incumbent)	72,475	47.9
Total votes		151,372	100.0
Democratic gain from Republican			

=== Results by municipality ===
Primary results by municipality
Municipality	Paula Swift (Democratic)		Tri Ta (Republican)		Vote margin		Total
Municipality	#	%	#	%	#	%	#
Dale-Augusta (unincorporated)	165	47.41%	183	52.59%	18	5.18%	348
Fountain Valley	7,275	44.04%	9,243	55.96%	1,968	11.95%	16,518
Garden Grove	15,409	47.57%	16,983	52.43%	1,574	4.86%	32,392
Huntington Beach	1,920	46.80%	2,183	53.20%	263	6.40%	4,103
Los Alamitos	1,492	48.41%	1,590	51.59%	98	3.18%	3,082
Mac Island (unincorporated)	34	51.52%	32	48.48%	-2	-3.04%	66
Midway City (unincorporated)	659	43.53%	855	56.47%	196	12.94%	1,514
North Fountain Valley (unincorporated)	63	78.75%	17	21.25%	-46	57.50%	80
Rossmoor (unincorporated)	1,782	42.91%	2,371	57.09%	589	14.18%	4,153
Rustic Lane (unincorporated)	9	52.94%	8	47.06%	-1	-5.88%	17
Santa Ana	3,760	51.50%	3,541	48.50%	-219	-3.00%	7,301
Seal Beach	1,234	45.92%	1,453	54.08%	219	8.16%	2,687
Stanton	3,058	54.10%	2,594	45.90%	-464	-8.20%	5,652
Westminster	8,488	42.03%	11,705	57.97%	3,217	15.94%	20,193
Totals	45,348	46.22%	52,758	53.78%	7,410	7.56%	98,106

== District 71 ==
2026 California's 71st State Assembly district election
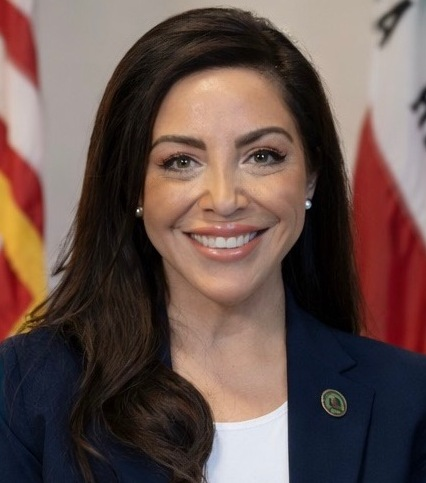

Candidate	Kate Sanchez	JJ Galvez
Party	Republican	Democratic
Popular vote	105,401	91,819
Percentage	53.4%	46.6%
State assemblymember before election
Kate Sanchez
Republican
State assemblymember after election
Kate Sanchez
Republican

Incumbent Republican Kate Sanchez was re-elected in 2024 with 61.5% of the vote. Sanchez is seeking re-election to her third term in office.

=== Candidates ===
==== Declared ====
- JJ Galvez (Democratic), director of the Silverado-Modjeska Recreation and Park District
- Kate Sanchez (Republican), incumbent state assemblymember

=== Endorsements ===
JJ Galvez (D)

Political parties

- California Democratic Party
Kate Sanchez (R)

Political parties

- California Republican Party

=== Results ===
2026 California's 71st State Assembly district election
Primary election
Party	Candidate	Votes	%
Republican	Kate Sanchez (incumbent)	82,430	58.2
Democratic	JJ Galvez	59,255	41.8
Total votes		141,685	100.0
General election
Republican	Kate Sanchez (incumbent)	105,401	53.4
Democratic	JJ Galvez	91,819	46.6
Total votes		197,220	100.0
Republican hold			

== District 72 ==
2026 California's 72nd State Assembly district election
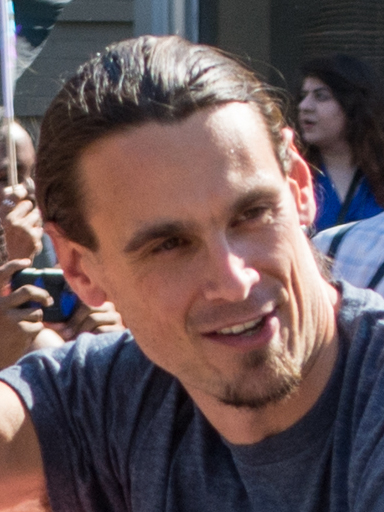

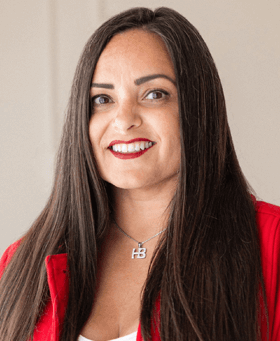
Candidate	Chris Kluwe	Gracey Van Der Mark
Party	Democratic	Republican
Popular vote	110,465	109,572
Percentage	50.2%	49.8%
State assemblymember before election
Diane Dixon
Republican
State assemblymember after election
Chris Kluwe
Democratic

Incumbent Republican Diane Dixon was re-elected in 2024 with 59.5% of the vote. Dixon has declined to seek a third term in office, instead seeking the District 5 seat on the Orange County Board of Supervisors.

=== Candidates ===
==== Declared ====
- Matthew Harper (Republican), former state assemblymember (2014–2018) and former mayor of Huntington Beach (2013–2014)
- Chris Kluwe (Democratic), former Minnesota Vikings football player
- Gracey Van Der Mark (Republican), Huntington Beach city councilor
- Frank Wagoner (No party preference), environmental advocate

==== Withdrawn ====
- Jordan Kirby (Democratic), nonprofit founder (endorsed Kluwe)
- Nathan Steele (Republican), Seal Beach city councilor

==== Declined ====
- Diane Dixon (Republican), incumbent state assemblymember (running for Orange County supervisor)

=== Endorsements ===
Matthew Harper (R)

Newspapers

- The Orange County Register
Chris Kluwe (D)

Organizations

- Our Revolution

Political parties

- California Democratic Party
- California Working Families Party
Gracey Van Der Mark (R)

State legislators

- Scott Baugh, former minority leader of the California State Assembly, former chair of the Orange County Republican Party, and runner-up for CA-47 in 2022 and 2024

Political parties

- California Republican Party

=== Results ===
2026 California's 72nd State Assembly district election
Primary election
Party	Candidate	Votes	%
Democratic	Chris Kluwe	70,530	43.8
Republican	Gracey Van Der Mark	60,688	37.7
Republican	Matthew Harper	26,435	16.4
No party preference	Frank Wagoner	3,372	2.1
Total votes		161,025	100.0
General election
Democratic	Chris Kluwe	110,465	50.2
Republican	Gracey Van Der Mark	109,572	49.8
Total votes		220,037	100.0
Democratic gain from Republican			

== District 73 ==
2026 California's 73rd State Assembly district election
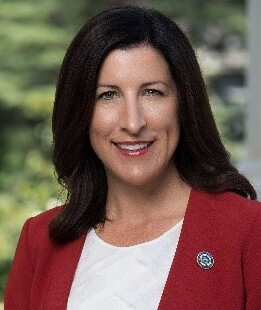

Candidate	Cottie Petrie-Norris	Urson Russell
Party	Democratic	Republican
Popular vote	98,437	54,951
Percentage	64.2%	35.8%
State assemblymember before election
Cottie Petrie-Norris
Democratic
State assemblymember after election
Cottie Petrie-Norris
Democratic

Incumbent Democrat Cottie Petrie-Norris was re-elected in 2024 with 56.8% of the vote. Petrie-Norris is seeking re-election to her fifth term in office.

=== Candidates ===
==== Declared ====
- Cottie Petrie-Norris (Democratic), incumbent state assemblymember
- Urson Russell (Republican), businessman

=== Endorsements ===
Cottie Petrie-Norris (D)

Political parties

- California Democratic Party

=== Results ===
2026 California's 73rd State Assembly district election
Primary election
Party	Candidate	Votes	%
Democratic	Cottie Petrie-Norris (incumbent)	60,261	60.9
Republican	Urson Russell	38,720	39.1
Total votes		98,981	100.0
General election
Democratic	Cottie Petrie-Norris (incumbent)	98,437	64.2
Republican	Urson Russell	54,951	35.8
Total votes		153,388	100.0
Democratic hold			

== District 74 ==
2026 California's 74th State Assembly district election
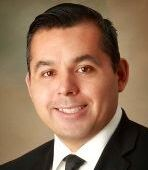

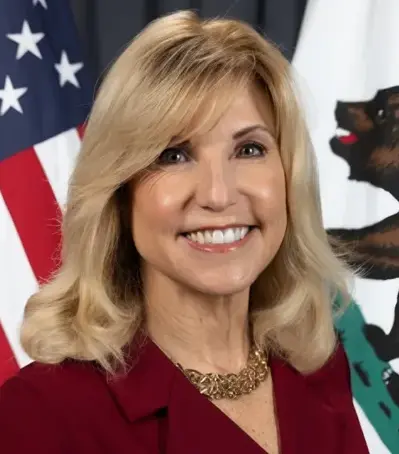
Candidate	Sergio Farias	Laurie Davies
Party	Democratic	Republican
Popular vote	102,139	94,679
Percentage	51.9%	48.1%
State assemblymember before election
Laurie Davies
Republican
State assemblymember after election
Sergio Farias
Democratic

Incumbent Republican Laurie Davies was re-elected in 2024 with 50.8% of the vote. Davies lost re-election for her fourth term in office to San Juan Capistrano city councilmembeer Sergio Farias.

=== Candidates ===
==== Declared ====
- Laurie Davies (Republican), incumbent state assemblymember
- Sergio Farias (Democratic), San Juan Capistrano city councilmember (2016–present)

=== Endorsements ===
Laurie Davies (R)

Political parties

- California Republican Party
Sergio Farias (D)

Political parties

- California Democratic Party

=== Results ===
2026 California's 74th State Assembly district election
Primary election
Party	Candidate	Votes	%
Republican	Laurie Davies (incumbent)	72,782	52.3
Democratic	Sergio Farias	66,403	47.7
Total votes		139,185	100.0
General election
Democratic	Sergio Farias	102,139	51.9
Republican	Laurie Davies (incumbent)	94,679	48.1
Total votes		196,818	100.0
Democratic gain from Republican			

== District 75 ==
2026 California's 75th State Assembly district election
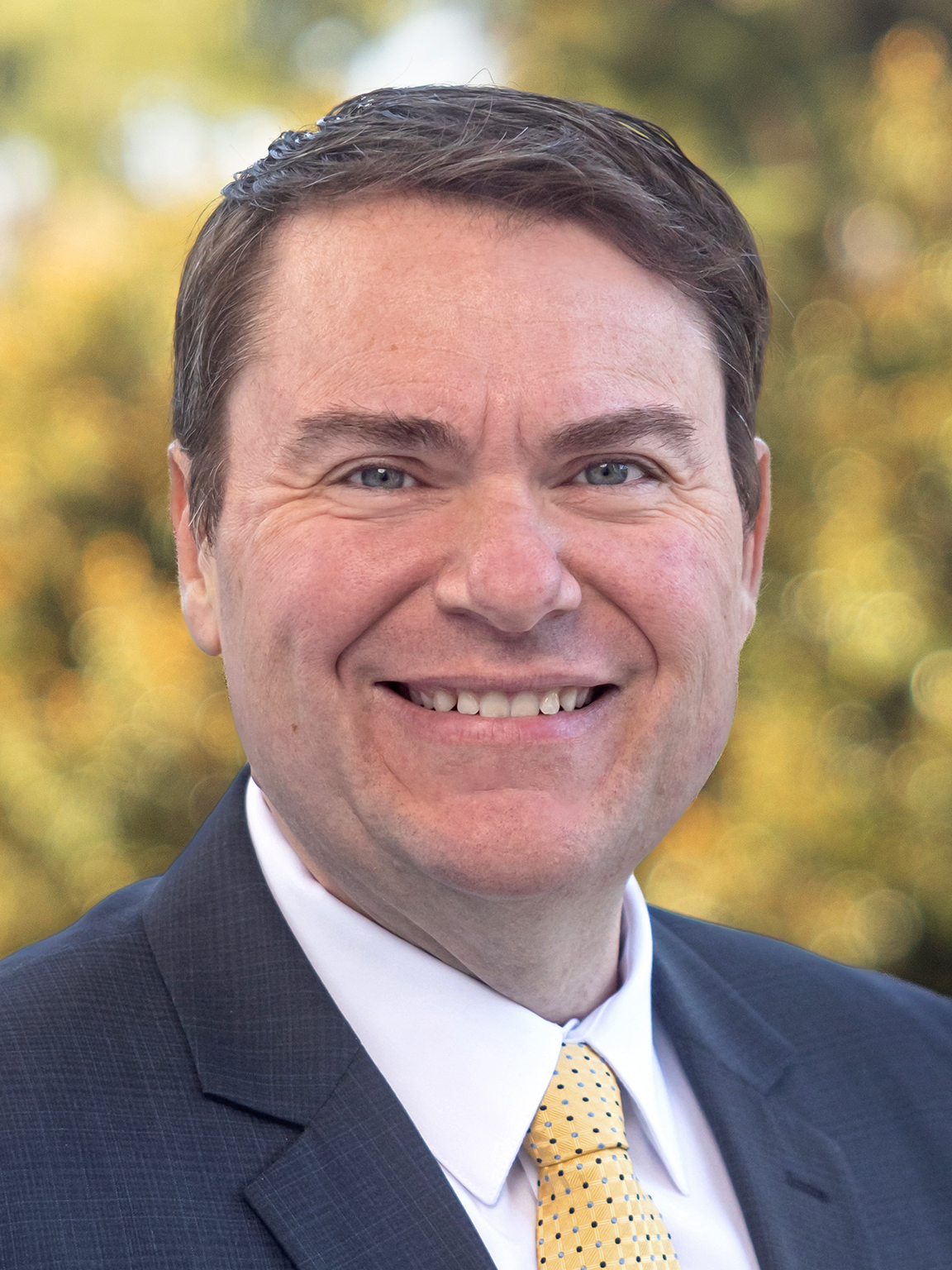

Candidate	Carl DeMaio	Gerald Boursiquot
Party	Republican	Democratic
Popular vote	109,374	91,448
Percentage	54.5%	45.5%
State assemblymember before election
Carl DeMaio
Republican
State assemblymember after election
Carl DeMaio
Republican

Incumbent Republican Carl DeMaio was first elected in 2024 with 57.0% of the vote. DeMaio is seeking re-election to his second term in office.

=== Candidates ===
==== Declared ====
- Gerald Boursiquot (Democratic), U.S. Airforce and U.S. Navy veteran
- Carl DeMaio (Republican), incumbent state assemblymember

=== Endorsements ===
Gerald Boursiquot (D)

Organizations

- Center for Biological Diversity Action Fund

Political parties

- California Democratic Party
Carl DeMaio (R)

Political parties

- California Republican Party

=== Results ===
2026 California's 75th State Assembly district election
Primary election
Party	Candidate	Votes	%
Republican	Carl DeMaio (incumbent)	85,573	59.7
Democratic	Gerald Boursiquot	57,811	40.3
Total votes		143,384	100.0
General election
Republican	Carl DeMaio (incumbent)	109,374	54.5
Democratic	Gerald Boursiquot	91,448	45.5
Total votes		200,822	100.0
Republican hold			

== District 76 ==
2026 California's 76th State Assembly district election
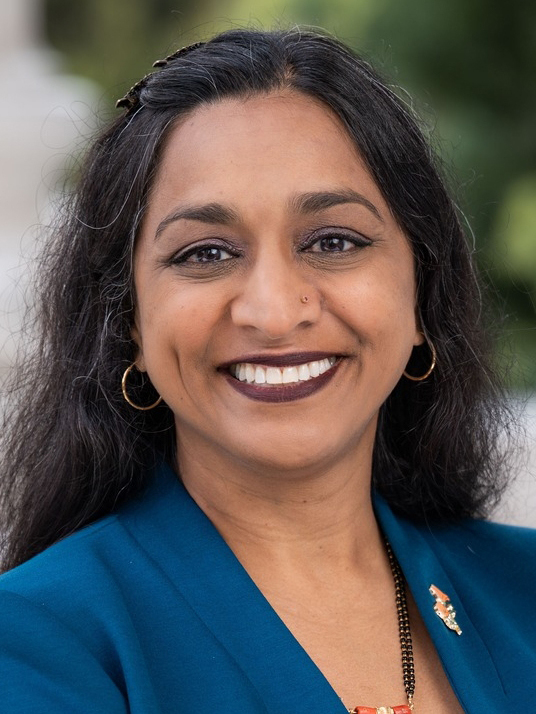

Candidate	Darshana Patel	Carrie Villanueva
Party	Democratic	Republican
Popular vote	114,297	72,860
Percentage	61.1%	38.9%
State assemblymember before election
Darshana Patel
Democratic
State assemblymember after election
Darshana Patel
Democratic

Incumbent Democrat Darshana Patel was first elected in 2024 with 54.0% of the vote. Patel is seeking re-election to her second term in office.

=== Candidates ===
==== Declared ====
- Carrie S. Espinoza Villanueva (Republican), academic department assistant at Palomar College
- Darshana Patel (Democratic), incumbent state assemblymember

=== Endorsements ===
Darshana Patel (D)

Political parties

- California Democratic Party

=== Results ===
2026 California's 76th State Assembly district election
Primary election
Party	Candidate	Votes	%
Democratic	Darshana Patel (incumbent)	69,235	55.8
Republican	Carrie Espinoza Villanueva	54,838	44.2
Total votes		124,073	100.0
General election
Democratic	Darshana Patel (incumbent)	114,297	61.1
Republican	Carrie Espinoza Villanueva	72,860	38.9
Total votes		187,157	100.0
Democratic hold			

== District 77 ==
2026 California's 77th State Assembly district election

Candidate	Tasha Boerner	Trinity Hannaway
Party	Democratic	Republican
Popular vote	142,397	75,711
Percentage	65.3%	34.7%
State assemblymember before election
Tasha Boerner
Democratic
State assemblymember after election
Tasha Boerner
Democratic

Incumbent Democrat Tasha Boerner was re-elected in 2024 with 60.4% of the vote. Boerner is seeking re-election to her fifth term in office.

=== Candidates ===
==== Declared ====
- Tasha Boerner (Democratic), incumbent state assemblymember
- Trinity Hannaway (Republican), outreach director for assemblyman Carl DeMaio

=== Endorsements ===
Tasha Boerner (D)

Organizations

- Center for Biological Diversity Action Fund

Political parties

- California Democratic Party

=== Results ===
2026 California's 77th State Assembly district election
Primary election
Party	Candidate	Votes	%
Democratic	Tasha Boerner (incumbent)	93,341	61.8
Republican	Trinity Hannaway	57,656	38.2
Total votes		150,997	100.0
General election
Democratic	Tasha Boerner (incumbent)	142,397	65.3
Republican	Trinity Hannaway	75,711	34.7
Total votes		218,108	100.0
Democratic hold			

== District 78 ==
2026 California's 78th State Assembly district election
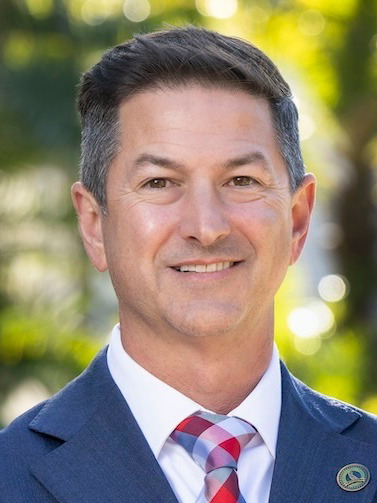

Candidate	Chris Ward	Payton Galvez
Party	Democratic	Republican
Popular vote	149,981	53,852
Percentage	73.6%	26.4%
State assemblymember before election
Chris Ward
Democratic
State assemblymember after election
Chris Ward
Democratic

Incumbent Democrat Chris Ward was re-elected to a third term unopposed in 2024. Ward is seeking re-election to his fourth term in office.

=== Candidates ===
==== Declared ====
- Payton Galvez (Republican), staffer from assemblyman Carl DeMaio's office
- Antonio Salguero (Libertarian), business owner
- Chris Ward (Democratic), incumbent state assemblymember

=== Endorsements ===
Chris Ward (D)

Political parties

- California Democratic Party

=== Results ===
2026 California's 78th State Assembly district election
Primary election
Party	Candidate	Votes	%
Democratic	Chris Ward (incumbent)	93,750	68.5
Republican	Payton Galvez	38,865	28.4
Libertarian	Antonio Salguero	4,277	3.1
Total votes		136,892	100.0
General election
Democratic	Chris Ward (incumbent)	149,981	73.6
Republican	Payton Galvez	53,852	26.4
Total votes		203,833	100.0
Democratic hold			

== District 79 ==
2026 California's 79th State Assembly district election
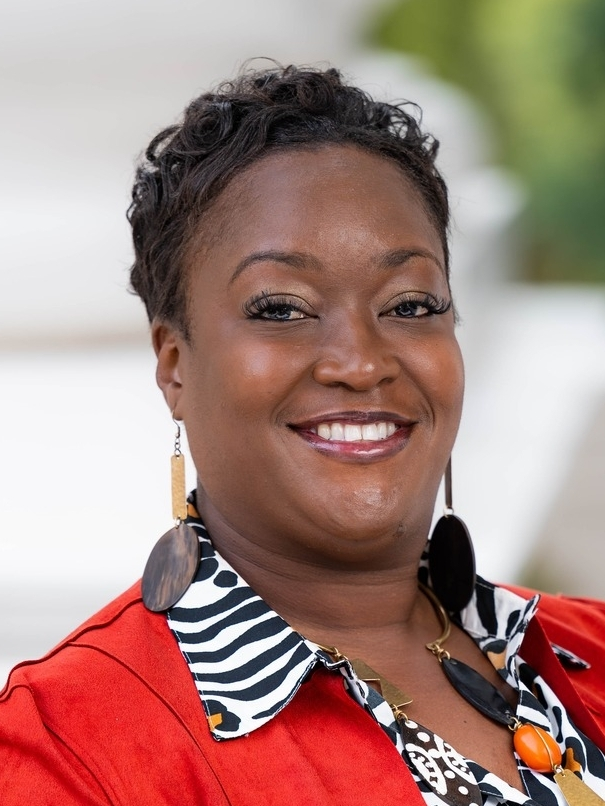

Candidate	LaShae Sharp-Collins	Andrew Lawson
Party	Democratic	Republican
Popular vote	101,201	42,828
Percentage	70.3%	29.7%
State assemblymember before election
LaShae Sharp-Collins
Democratic
State assemblymember after election
LaShae Sharp-Collins
Democratic

Incumbent Democrat LaShae Sharp-Collins was elected in 2024 with 54.0% of the vote. Sharp-Collins is seeking re-election to her second term in office.

=== Candidates ===
==== Declared ====
- Andrew Lawson (Republican), member of the Spring Valley Community Planning Group
- LaShae Sharp-Collins (Democratic), incumbent state assemblymember

=== Endorsements ===
LaShae Sharp-Collins (D)

Political parties

- California Democratic Party
Andrew Lawson (R)

Organizations

- Howard Jarvis Taxpayers Association

Political parties

- California Republican Party

=== Results ===
2026 California's 79th State Assembly district election
Primary election
Party	Candidate	Votes	%
Democratic	LaShae Sharp-Collins (incumbent)	55,472	64.7
Republican	Andrew Lawson	30,320	35.3
Total votes		85,792	100.0
General election
Democratic	LaShae Sharp-Collins (incumbent)	101,201	70.3
Republican	Andrew Lawson	42,828	29.7
Total votes		144,029	100.0
Democratic hold			

== District 80 ==
2026 California's 80th State Assembly district election
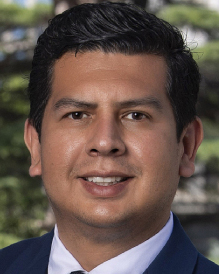

Candidate	David Alvarez	Alejandro Galicia
Party	Democratic	Republican
Popular vote	110,316	45,305
Percentage	70.9%	29.1%
State assemblymember before election
David Alvarez
Democratic
State assemblymember after election
David Alvarez
Democratic

Incumbent Democrat David Alvarez was elected in 2024 with 61.0% of the vote. Alvarez is seeking re-election to his third full term in office.

=== Candidates ===
==== Declared ====
- David Alvarez (Democratic), incumbent state assemblymember
- Alejandro Galicia (Republican), business owner
- Zenith Khan (Democratic), business owner

=== Endorsements ===
David Alvarez (D)

Political parties

- California Democratic Party

=== Results ===
2026 California's 80th State Assembly district election
Primary election
Party	Candidate	Votes	%
Democratic	David Alvarez (incumbent)	53,372	59.1
Republican	Alejandro Galicia	30,871	34.2
Democratic	Zenith Khan	6,031	6.7
Total votes		90,274	100.0
General election
Democratic	David Alvarez (incumbent)	110,316	70.9
Republican	Alejandro Galicia	45,305	29.1
Total votes		155,621	100.0
Democratic hold			
