= 2016 United States state legislative elections =

- November 8, 2016

86 legislative chambers 44 states
Party	Republican	Democratic	Coalition
Chambers before	68	30	1 (Note: In the Washington State Senate, one Democrat caucused with Republicans to form the Majority Coalition Caucus)
Chambers after	66	29	3 (Note: The Alaska House of Representatives Moderate Republicans formed a coalition with Democrats and Independents.) (Note: Republicans lost their majority in the New York Senate, but the Independent Democratic Conference continued to caucus with them to form a coalition.)
Overall change	▼2	▼1 (Note: The Connecticut Senate was tied in the 2017-2019 session. This is not counted in the total here.)	▲2
- Map of upper house elections: Democrats gained control Democrats retained control Republicans gained control Republicans retained control Coalition gained control Coalition retained control Split body formed Non-partisan legislature No regularly-scheduled elections

- Map of lower house elections: Democrats gained control Democrats retained control Republicans gained control Republicans retained control Coalition gained control Non-partisan legislature No regularly-scheduled elections

The 2016 United States state legislative elections were held on November 8, 2016, for 86 state legislative chambers in 44 states. Across the fifty states, approximately 65 percent of all upper house seats and 85 percent of all lower house seats were up for election. Nine legislative chambers in the five permanently inhabited U.S. territories and the federal district of Washington, D.C. also held elections. The elections took place concurrently with several other federal, state, and local elections, including the presidential election, U.S. Senate elections, U.S. House elections, and gubernatorial elections.

Democrats won both chambers in the Nevada Legislature and the New Mexico House of Representatives, while Republicans won the Kentucky House of Representatives for the first time since 1922, the Iowa Senate, and the Minnesota Senate. The Alaska House of Representatives flipped from Republican control to a Democrat-led coalition majority, and the Connecticut State Senate went from Democratic control to tied control. Meanwhile, the New York Senate went from Republican to a Republican-led coalition.

The Democrats' loss in Kentucky marked the end of the realignment of the conservative South towards the Republicans, as the House of Representatives was the last chamber they held in the region, and the last chamber they controlled in a deeply Republican state. This also gave Republicans a government trifecta in the state for the first time in its history.

== Summary table ==
Regularly scheduled elections were held in 86 of the 99 state legislative chambers in the United States. Nationwide, regularly scheduled elections were held for 5,876 of the 7,383 legislative seats. Many legislative chambers held elections for all seats, but some legislative chambers that use staggered elections held elections for only a portion of the total seats in the chamber. The chambers not up for election either hold regularly scheduled elections in odd-numbered years, or have four-year terms and hold all regularly scheduled elections in presidential midterm election years.

Note that this table only covers regularly scheduled elections; additional special elections took place concurrently with these regularly scheduled elections.

State	Upper House				Lower House			
State	Seats up	Total	% up	Term	Seats up	Total	% up	Term
Alabama	0	35	0	4	0	105	0	4
Alaska	10	20	50	4	40	40	100	2
Arizona	30	30	100	2	60	60	100	2
Arkansas	17	35	49	2/4 (Note: The upper houses of Arkansas, Delaware, Florida, Hawaii, Illinois, Minnesota, New Jersey, and Texas use a 2-4-4 term length system.)	100	100	100	2
California	20	40	50	4	80	80	100	2
Colorado	18	35	51	4	65	65	100	2
Connecticut	36	36	100	2	151	151	100	2
Delaware	11	21	52	2/4	41	41	100	2
Florida	20	40	50	2/4	120	120	100	2
Georgia	56	56	100	2	180	180	100	2
Hawaii	13	25	52	2/4	51	51	100	2
Idaho	35	35	100	2	70	70	100	2
Illinois	20	59	34	2/4	118	118	100	2
Indiana	25	50	50	4	100	100	100	2
Iowa	25	50	50	4	100	100	100	2
Kansas	40	40	100	4	125	125	100	2
Kentucky	19	38	50	4	100	100	100	2
Louisiana	0	39	0	4	0	105	0	4
Maine	35	35	100	2	151	151	100	2
Maryland	0	47	0	4	0	141	0	4
Massachusetts	40	40	100	2	160	160	100	2
Michigan	0	38	0	4	110	110	100	2
Minnesota	67	67	100	2/4	134	134	100	2
Mississippi	0	52	0	4	0	122	0	4
Missouri	17	34	50	4	163	163	100	2
Montana	25	50	50	4	100	100	100	2
Nebraska	25 (Note: These figures represent the seats of Nebraska's unicameral legislature.)	49	51	4	N/A (unicameral)			
Nevada	10	21	48	4	42	42	100	2
New Hampshire	24	24	100	2	400	400	100	2
New Jersey	0	40	0	2/4	0	80	0	2
New Mexico	42	42	100	4	70	70	100	2
New York	63	63	100	2	150	150	100	2
North Carolina	50	50	100	2	120	120	100	2
North Dakota	23	47	49	4	47	94	50	4
Ohio	16	33	48	4	99	99	100	2
Oklahoma	24	48	50	4	101	101	100	2
Oregon	15	30	50	4	60	60	100	2
Pennsylvania	25	50	50	4	203	203	100	2
Rhode Island	38	38	100	2	75	75	100	2
South Carolina	46	46	100	4	124	124	100	2
South Dakota	35	35	100	2	70	70	100	2
Tennessee	16	33	48	4	99	99	100	2
Texas	16	31	52	2/4	150	150	100	2
Utah	15	29	52	4	75	75	100	2
Vermont	30	30	100	2	150	150	100	2
Virginia	0	40	0	4	0	100	0	2
Washington	25	49	51	4	98	98	100	2
West Virginia	17	34	50	4	100	100	100	2
Wisconsin	16	33	48	4	99	99	100	2
Wyoming	15	30	50	4	60	60	100	2
Total	1281	1972	65	N/A	4595	5411	85	N/A

== Electoral predictions ==
News sources predicted Democrats to make mild gains in state legislative control, owing to the historic lows they hit after the 2014 elections and higher predicted turnout among Democratic voters during the concurrent presidential election.

Ratings are designated as follows:

- "Tossup": Competitive, no advantage
- "Lean": Competitive, slight advantage
- "Likely": Not competitive, but opposition could make significant gains
- "Safe": Not competitive at all

State	PVI	Chamber	Last election	Governing Oct. 12, 2016	Result
Alaska	R+12	Senate	R 14–6	Likely R	R 14–6
Alaska	R+12	House of Representatives	R 23–16–1	Likely R	Coal. 22–18
Arizona	R+7	Senate	R 17–13	Lean R	R 17–13
Arizona	R+7	House of Representatives	R 36–24	Lean R	R 35–25
Arkansas	R+14	Senate	R 24–11	Safe R	R 26–9
Arkansas	R+14	House of Representatives	R 64–36	Safe R	R 73–27
California	D+9	State Senate	D 26–14	Safe D	D 27–13
California	D+9	State Assembly	D 52–28	Safe D	D 55–25
Colorado	D+1	Senate	R 18–17	Tossup	R 18–17
Colorado	D+1	House of Representatives	D 34–31	Lean D	D 37–28
Connecticut	D+7	State Senate	D 21–15	Tossup	18–18
Connecticut	D+7	House of Representatives	D 87–64	Lean D	D 80–71
Delaware	D+8	Senate	D 12–9	Safe D	D 11–10
Delaware	D+8	House of Representatives	D 25–16	Safe D	D 25–16
Florida	R+2	Senate	R 26–14	Likely R	R 25–15
Florida	R+2	House of Representatives	R 81–39	Likely R	R 79–41
Georgia	R+6	State Senate	R 38–18	Safe R	R 38–18
Georgia	R+6	House of Representatives	R 119–60–1	Safe R	R 118–62
Hawaii	D+20	Senate	D 24–1	Safe D	D 25–0
Hawaii	D+20	House of Representatives	D 43–8	Safe D	D 45–6
Idaho	R+18	Senate	R 28–7	Safe R	R 29–6
Idaho	R+18	House of Representatives	R 56–14	Safe R	R 59–11
Illinois	D+8	Senate	D 39–20	Likely D	D 37–22
Illinois	D+8	House of Representatives	D 71–47	Likely D	D 67–51
Indiana	R+5	Senate	R 40–10	Safe R	R 41–9
Indiana	R+5	House of Representatives	R 71–29	Safe R	R 70–30
Iowa	D+1	Senate	D 26–24	Lean D	R 29–20–1
Iowa	D+1	House of Representatives	R 57–43	Likely R	R 59–41
Kansas	R+12	Senate	R 32–8	Likely R	R 31–9
Kansas	R+12	House of Representatives	R 97–28	Likely R	R 85–40
Kentucky	R+13	Senate	R 26–12	Safe R	R 27–11
Kentucky	R+13	House of Representatives	D 54–46	Tossup	R 64–36
Maine	D+6	Senate	R 20–15	Tossup	R 18–17
Maine	D+6	House of Representatives	D 78–68–5	Lean D	D 77–72–2
Massachusetts	D+10	Senate	D 34–6	Safe D	D 34–6
Massachusetts	D+10	House of Representatives	D 125–35	Safe D	D 125–35
Michigan	D+4	House of Representatives	R 63–47	Lean R	R 63–47
Minnesota	D+2	Senate	D 39–28	Lean D	R 34–33
Minnesota	D+2	House of Representatives	R 72–62	Lean R	R 77–57
Missouri	R+5	Senate	R 25–9	Likely R	R 25–9
Missouri	R+5	House of Representatives	R 117–45–1	Likely R	R 117–46
Montana	R+7	Senate	R 29–21	Safe R	R 32–18
Montana	R+7	House of Representatives	R 59–41	Safe R	R 59–41
Nevada	D+2	Senate	R 11–10	Tossup	D 11–10
Nevada	D+2	Assembly	R 27–15	Lean D (flip)	D 27–15
New Hampshire	D+1	Senate	R 14–10	Tossup	R 14–10
New Hampshire	D+1	House of Representatives	R 239–160–1	Lean R	R 227–173
New Mexico	D+4	Senate	D 24–18	Lean D	D 26–16
New Mexico	D+4	House of Representatives	R 37–33	Tossup	D 38–32
New York	D+11	State Senate	R 32–31	Tossup	Coal. 39–24
New York	D+11	State Assembly	D 105–43–1–1	Safe D	D 106–43–1
North Carolina	R+3	Senate	R 34–16	Lean R	R 35–15
North Carolina	R+3	House of Representatives	R 74–46	Lean R	R 74–46
North Dakota	R+10	Senate	R 32–15	Safe R	R 38–9
North Dakota	R+10	House of Representatives	R 71–23	Safe R	R 81–13
Ohio	R+1	Senate	R 23–10	Likely R	R 24–9
Ohio	R+1	House of Representatives	R 65–34	Likely R	R 66–33
Oklahoma	R+19	Senate	R 40–8	Safe R	R 42–6
Oklahoma	R+19	House of Representatives	R 72–29	Safe R	R 75–26
Oregon	D+5	State Senate	D 18–12	Safe D	D 17–13
Oregon	D+5	House of Representatives	D 34–26	Likely D	D 35–25
Pennsylvania	D+1	State Senate	R 30–20	Likely R	R 34–16
Pennsylvania	D+1	House of Representatives	R 119–84	Likely R	R 121–82
Rhode Island	D+11	Senate	D 32–5–1	Safe D	D 33–5
Rhode Island	D+11	House of Representatives	D 63–12	Safe D	D 64–10–1
South Carolina	R+8	Senate	R 28–18	Safe R	R 28–18
South Carolina	R+8	House of Representatives	R 78–46	Safe R	R 80–44
South Dakota	R+10	Senate	R 27–8	Safe R	R 29–6
South Dakota	R+10	House of Representatives	R 58–12	Safe R	R 60–10
Tennessee	R+12	Senate	R 28–5	Safe R	R 28–5
Tennessee	R+12	House of Representatives	R 73–26	Safe R	R 74–25
Texas	R+10	Senate	R 20–11	Safe R	R 20–11
Texas	R+10	House of Representatives	R 98–52	Safe R	R 95–55
Utah	R+22	State Senate	R 24–5	Safe R	R 24–5
Utah	R+22	House of Representatives	R 63–12	Safe R	R 62–13
Vermont	D+18	Senate	D 19–9–2	Safe D	D 21–7–2
Vermont	D+18	House of Representatives	D 85–53–6–6	Safe D	D 85–53–7–7
Washington	D+5	State Senate	Coal. 26–23	Lean R	Coal. 25–24
Washington	D+5	House of Representatives	D 50–48	Lean D	D 50–48
West Virginia	R+13	Senate	R 18–16 (Note: Includes a post-election party switch by Senator Daniel Hall which gave Republicans control of the chamber.)	Lean R	R 22–12
West Virginia	R+13	House of Delegates	R 64–36	Likely R	R 63–37
Wisconsin	D+2	Senate	R 19–14	Lean R	R 20–13
Wisconsin	D+2	State Assembly	R 63–36	Lean R	R 64–35
Wyoming	R+22	Senate	R 26–4	Safe R	R 27–3
Wyoming	R+22	House of Representatives	R 51–9	Safe R	R 51–9

== Maps ==
Upper house seats by party holding majority in each state
Republican 50–60% 60–70% 70–80% 80–90% 90–100%	Democratic 50–60% 60–70% 70–80% 80–90% 90–100%	Tie 50%

Lower house seats by party holding majority in each state
Republican 50–60% 60–70% 70–80% 80–90%	Democratic 50–60% 60–70% 70–80% 80–90%

Net changes to upper house seats after the 2016 elections
+1 Dem seat +2 Dem seats +3 Dem seats
+1 Rep seat +2 Rep seats +3–4 Rep seats +6 Rep seats

Net changes to lower house seats after the 2016 elections
+1 Dem seat +2 Dem seats +3–5 Dem seats +10–13 Dem seats
+1 Rep seat +2 Rep seats +3–5 Rep seats
+6–10 Rep seats +17 Rep seats
+1 Ind seat +1 Prog seat

== State summaries ==
=== Alaska ===
Half of the seats of the Alaska Senate and all of the seats of the Alaska House of Representatives were up for election in 2016. The Alaska legislature was controlled by Republicans. Republicans maintained control of the Senate, while the Alaska House of Representatives flipped to a Democratic-led coalition of Democrats, Republicans, and independents.

Alaska Senate
Party	Before	After	Change
Republican	14	14	Steady
Democratic	6	6	Steady
Total	20	20	

Alaska House of Representatives
Party	Before	After	Change
Democratic	12	17 (Note: Coalition consisted of 15 Democrats, 8 Republicans, and 2 Independents.)	▲1
Democratic	4 (Note: Four Democrats caucused with the Republican majority)	17	▲1
Independent	1	2	▲1
Republican	23	3	▼2
Republican	23	18	▼2
Total	40	40	

=== Arizona ===
All of the seats of the Arizona Senate and the Arizona House of Representatives were up for election in 2016. Republicans maintained a government trifecta with control of the governorship and both state legislative chambers.

Arizona Senate
Party	Before	After	Change
Republican	18	17	▼1
Democratic	12	13	▲1
Total	30	30	

Arizona House of Representatives
Party	Before	After	Change
Republican	36	35	▼1
Democratic	24	25	▲1
Total	60	60	

=== Arkansas ===
Half of the seats of the Arkansas Senate and all of the seats of the Arkansas House of Representatives were up for election in 2016. Republicans held control of both chambers, maintaining a government trifecta.

Arkansas Senate
Party	Before	After	Change
Republican	24	26	▲2
Democratic	11	9	▼2
Total	35	35	

Arkansas House of Representatives
Party	Before	After	Change
Republican	64	73	▲9
Democratic	35	27	▼8
Independent	1	0	▼1
Total	100	100	

=== California ===
Half of the seats of the California State Senate and all of the seats of the California State Assembly were up for election in 2016. Democrats held control of both chambers, maintaining a government trifecta.

California State Senate
Party	Before	After	Change
Democratic	26	27	▲1
Republican	14	13	▼1
Total	40	40	

California State Assembly
Party	Before	After	Change
Democratic	52	55	▲3
Republican	28	25	▼3
Total	80	80	

=== Colorado ===
Half of the seats of the Colorado Senate and all of the seats of the Colorado House of Representatives were up for election in 2016. Democrats held control of the state House and Republicans maintained control of the state Senate.

Colorado Senate
Party	Before	After	Change
Republican	18	18	Steady
Democratic	17	17	Steady
Total	35	35	

Colorado House of Representatives
Party	Before	After	Change
Democratic	34	37	▲3
Republican	31	28	▼3
Total	65	65	

=== Connecticut ===
All of the seats of the Connecticut State Senate and the Connecticut House of Representatives were up for election in 2016. Democrats held control of the state House, while the state Senate went from Democratic to evenly split.

Connecticut State Senate
Party	Before	After	Change
Democratic	21	18	▼3
Republican	15	18	▲3
Total	36	36	

Connecticut House of Representatives
Party	Before	After	Change
Democratic	87	80	▼7
Republican	64	71	▲7
Total	151	151	

=== Delaware ===
Half of the seats of the Delaware Senate and all of the seats of the Delaware House of Representatives were up for election in 2016. Democrats held control of both chambers, maintaining a government trifecta.

Delaware Senate
Party	Before	After	Change
Democratic	12	11	▼1
Republican	9	10	▲1
Total	21	21	

Delaware House of Representatives
Party	Before	After	Change
Democratic	25	25	Steady
Republican	16	16	Steady
Total	41	41	

=== Florida ===
Half of the seats of the Florida Senate and all of the seats of the Florida House of Representatives were up for election in 2016. Republicans held control of both chambers, maintaining a government trifecta.

Florida Senate
Party	Before	After	Change
Republican	26	25	▼1
Democratic	14	15	▲1
Total	40	40	

Florida House of Representatives
Party	Before	After	Change
Republican	81	79	▼2
Democratic	39	41	▲2
Total	120	120	

=== Georgia ===
All of the seats of the Georgia State Senate and the Georgia House of Representatives were up for election in 2016. Republicans held control of both chambers, maintaining a government trifecta.

Georgia State Senate
Party	Before	After	Change
Republican	39	38	▼1
Democratic	17	18	▲1
Total	56	56	

Georgia House of Representatives
Party	Before	After	Change
Republican	118	118	Steady
Democratic	61	62	▲1
Independent	1	0	▼1
Total	180	180	

=== Hawaii ===
Half of the seats of the Hawaii Senate and all of the seats of the Hawaii House of Representatives were up for election in 2016. Democrats held control of both chambers, maintaining a government trifecta.

Hawaii Senate
Party	Before	After	Change
Democratic	24	25	▲1
Republican	1	0	▼1
Total	25	25	

Hawaii House of Representatives
Party	Before	After	Change
Democratic	44	45	▲1
Republican	7	6	▼1
Total	51	51	

=== Idaho ===
All of the seats of the Idaho Senate and the Idaho House of Representatives were up for election in 2016. Republicans held control of both chambers, maintaining a government trifecta.

Idaho Senate
Party	Before	After	Change
Republican	28	29	▲1
Democratic	7	6	▼1
Total	35	35	

Idaho House of Representatives
Party	Before	After	Change
Republican	56	59	▲3
Democratic	14	11	▼3
Total	70	70	

=== Illinois ===
One-third of the seats of the Illinois Senate and all of the seats of the Illinois House of Representatives were up for election in 2016. Democrats held control of both chambers.

Illinois Senate
Party	Before	After	Change
Democratic	39	37	▼2
Republican	20	22	▲2
Total	59	59	

Illinois House of Representatives
Party	Before	After	Change
Democratic	71	67	▼4
Republican	47	51	▲4
Total	118	118	

=== Indiana ===
Half of the seats of the Indiana Senate and all of the seats of the Indiana House of Representatives were up for election in 2016. Republicans held control of both chambers, maintaining a government trifecta.

Indiana Senate
Party	Before	After	Change
Republican	40	41	▲1
Democratic	10	9	▼1
Total	50	50	

Indiana House of Representatives
Party	Before	After	Change
Republican	71	70	▼1
Democratic	29	30	▲1
Total	100	100	

=== Iowa ===
Half of the seats of the Iowa Senate and all of the seats of the Iowa House of Representatives were up for election in 2016. Republicans held control of the state House, and won the state Senate thereby establishing a government trifecta.

Iowa Senate
Party	Before	After	Change
Republican	23	29	▲6
Democratic	26	20	▼6
Independent	1	1	Steady
Total	50	50	

Iowa House of Representatives
Party	Before	After	Change
Republican	57	59	▲2
Democratic	43	41	▼2
Total	100	100	

=== Kansas ===
All of the seats of the Kansas Senate and the Kansas House of Representatives were up for election in 2016. Republicans held control of both chambers.

Kansas Senate
Party	Before	After	Change
Republican	32	31	▼1
Democratic	8	9	▲1
Total	40	40	

Kansas House of Representatives
Party	Before	After	Change
Republican	97	85	▼12
Democratic	28	40	▲12
Total	125	125	

=== Kentucky ===
Half of the seats of the Kentucky Senate and all of the seats of the Kentucky House of Representatives were up for election in 2016. Republicans held control of the state Senate, and won control of the state House for the first time since 1922, thus establishing a Republican trifecta.

Kentucky Senate
Party	Before	After	Change
Republican	27	27	Steady
Democratic	11	11	Steady
Total	38	38	

Kentucky House of Representatives
Party	Before	After	Change
Republican	47	64	▲17
Democratic	53	36	▼17
Total	100	100	

=== Maine ===
All of the seats of the Maine Senate and the Maine House of Representatives were up for election in 2016. Democrats held control of the state House, and Republicans maintained control of the state Senate.

Maine Senate
Party	Before	After	Change
Republican	20	18	▼2
Democratic	15	17	▲2
Total	35	35	

Maine House of Representatives
Party	Before	After	Change
Democratic	78	77	▼1
Republican	69	72	▲3
Independent	4	2	▼2
Total	151	151	

=== Massachusetts ===
All of the seats of the Massachusetts Senate and the Massachusetts House of Representatives were up for election in 2016. Democrats retained control of both chambers.

Massachusetts Senate
Party	Before	After	Change
Democratic	34	34	Steady
Republican	6	6	Steady
Total	40	40	

Massachusetts House of Representatives
Party	Before	After	Change
Democratic	126	125	▼1
Republican	34	35	▲1
Total	160	160	

=== Michigan ===
All of the seats of the Michigan House of Representatives were up for election in 2016. The Michigan Senate did not hold regularly scheduled elections in 2016. Republicans maintained control of the chamber.

Michigan House of Representatives
Party	Before	After	Change
Republican	63	63	Steady
Democratic	47	47	Steady
Total	110	110	

=== Minnesota ===
All of the seats of the Minnesota Senate and the Minnesota House of Representatives were up for election in 2016. Republicans won control of the State Senate, while maintaining control of the state House.

Minnesota Senate
Party	Before	After	Change
Republican	28	34	▲6
Democratic (DFL)	39	33	▼6
Total	67	67	

Minnesota House of Representatives
Party	Before	After	Change
Republican	73	77	▲4
Democratic (DFL)	61	57	▼4
Total	134	134	

=== Missouri ===
Half of the seats of the Missouri Senate and all of the seats of the Missouri House of Representatives were up for election in 2016. Republicans held control of both chambers.

Missouri Senate
Party	Before	After	Change
Republican	25	25	Steady
Democratic	9	9	Steady
Total	34	34	

Missouri House of Representatives
Party	Before	After	Change
Republican	117	117	Steady
Democratic	45	46	▲1
Independent	1	0	▼1
Total	163	163	

=== Montana ===
Half of the seats of the Montana Senate and all of the seats of the Montana House of Representatives were up for election in 2016. Republicans held control of both chambers.

Montana Senate
Party	Before	After	Change
Republican	29	32	▲3
Democratic	21	18	▼3
Total	50	50	

Montana House of Representatives
Party	Before	After	Change
Republican	59	59	Steady
Democratic	41	41	Steady
Total	100	100	

=== Nebraska ===
Nebraska is the only U.S. state with a unicameral legislature; half of the seats of the Nebraska Legislature were up for election in 2016. Nebraska is also unique in that its legislature is officially non-partisan and holds non-partisan elections, although the Democratic and Republican parties each endorse legislative candidates.

Nebraska Legislature
Party	Before	After	Change
Republican	35	32	▼3
Democratic	12	15	▲3
Independent	1	1	Steady
Libertarian	1	1	Steady
Total	49	49	

=== Nevada ===
Half of the seats of the Nevada Senate and all of the seats of the Nevada Assembly were up for election in 2016. Democrats won control of both chambers, ending a government trifecta.

Nevada Senate
Party	Before	After	Change
Democratic	10	11	▲1
Republican	11	10	▼1
Total	21	21	

Nevada Assembly
Party	Before	After	Change
Democratic	17	27	▲10
Republican	24	15	▼9
Libertarian	1	0	▼1
Total	42	42	

=== New Hampshire ===
All of the seats of the New Hampshire Senate and the New Hampshire House of Representatives were up for election in 2016. Republicans maintained control of both chambers.

New Hampshire Senate
Party	Before	After	Change
Republican	14	14	Steady
Democratic	10	10	Steady
Total	24	24	

New Hampshire House of Representatives
Party	Before	After	Change
Republican	239	227	▼12
Democratic	160	173	▲13
Independent	1	0	▼1
Total	400	400	

=== New Mexico ===
All of the seats of the New Mexico Senate and the New Mexico House of Representatives were up for election in 2016. Democrats held control of the state Senate, and won the state House.

New Mexico Senate
Party	Before	After	Change
Democratic	24	26	▲2
Republican	18	16	▼2
Total	42	42	

New Mexico House of Representatives
Party	Before	After	Change
Democratic	33	38	▲5
Republican	37	32	▼5
Total	70	70	

=== New York ===
All of the seats of the New York State Senate and the New York State Assembly were up for election in 2016. Democrats held control of the state House, and Republicans lost outright control of the state Senate, requiring the Independent Democratic Conference to continue to caucus with them.

New York State Senate
Party	Before	After	Change
Republican	32	31	▼1
Democratic	6 (Note: 5 members of the Independent Democratic Caucus as well as Democrat Simcha Felder.)	8 (Note: 7 members of the Independent Democratic Caucus as well as Democrat Simcha Felder.)	▲2
Democratic	25	24	▼1
Total	63	63	

New York State Assembly
Party	Before	After	Change
Democratic	106	106	Steady
Republican	42	43	▲1
Independence	1	1	Steady
Conservative	1	0	▼1
Total	150	150	

=== North Carolina ===
All of the seats of the North Carolina Senate and the North Carolina House of Representatives were up for election in 2016. Republicans retained control of both chambers.

North Carolina Senate
Party	Before	After	Change
Republican	34	35	▲1
Democratic	16	15	▼1
Total	50	50	

North Carolina House of Representatives
Party	Before	After	Change
Republican	74	74	Steady
Independent	1	0	▼1
Democratic	45	46	▲1
Total	120	120	

=== North Dakota ===
Half of the seats of the North Dakota Senate and the North Dakota House of Representatives were up for election in 2016. Republicans retained control of both chambers, maintaining a government trifecta.

North Dakota Senate
Party	Before	After	Change
Republican	32	38	▲6
Democratic-NPL	15	9	▼6
Total	47	47	

North Dakota House of Representatives
Party	Before	After	Change
Republican	71	81	▲10
Democratic-NPL	23	13	▼10
Total	94	94	

=== Ohio ===
Half of the seats of the Ohio Senate and all of the seats of the Ohio House of Representatives were up for election in 2016. Republicans retained control of both chambers, maintaining a government trifecta.

Ohio Senate
Party	Before	After	Change
Republican	23	24	▲1
Democratic	10	9	▼1
Total	33	33	

Ohio House of Representatives
Party	Before	After	Change
Republican	65	66	▲1
Democratic	34	33	▼1
Total	99	99	

=== Oklahoma ===
Half of the seats of the Oklahoma Senate and all of the seats of the Oklahoma House of Representatives were up for election in 2016. Republicans retained control of both chambers, maintaining a government trifecta.

Oklahoma Senate
Party	Before	After	Change
Republican	39	42	▲3
Democratic	9	6	▼3
Total	48	48	

Oklahoma House of Representatives
Party	Before	After	Change
Republican	71	75	▲4
Democratic	30	26	▼4
Total	101	101	

=== Oregon ===
Half of the seats of the Oregon State Senate and all of the seats of the Oregon House of Representatives were up for election in 2016. Democrats retained control of both chambers, maintaining a government trifecta.

Oregon State Senate
Party	Before	After	Change
Democratic	18	17	▼1
Republican	12	13	▲1
Total	30	30	

Oregon House of Representatives
Party	Before	After	Change
Democratic	35	35	Steady
Republican	25	25	Steady
Total	50	50	

=== Pennsylvania ===
Half of the seats of the Pennsylvania State Senate and all of the seats of the Pennsylvania House of Representatives were up for election in 2016. Republicans retained control of both chambers.

Pennsylvania State Senate
Party	Before	After	Change
Republican	31	34	▲3
Democratic	19	16	▼3
Total	50	50	

Pennsylvania House of Representatives
Party	Before	After	Change
Republican	119	121	▲2
Democratic	84	82	▼2
Total	203	203	

=== Rhode Island ===
All of the seats of the Rhode Island Senate and the Rhode Island House of Representatives were up for election in 2016. Democrats retained control of both chambers, maintaining a government trifecta.

Rhode Island Senate
Party	Before	After	Change
Democratic	32	33	▲1
Republican	5	5	Steady
Independent	1	0	▼1
Total	38	38	

Rhode Island House of Representatives
Party	Before	After	Change
Democratic	62	64	▲2
Republican	12	10	▼2
Independent	1	1	Steady
Total	75	75	

=== South Carolina ===
All of the seats of the South Carolina Senate and the South Carolina House of Representatives were up for election in 2016. Republicans retained control of both chambers, maintaining a government trifecta.

South Carolina Senate
Party	Before	After	Change
Republican	28	28	Steady
Democratic	18	18	Steady
Total	46	46	

South Carolina House of Representatives
Party	Before	After	Change
Republican	78	80	▲2
Democratic	46	44	▼2
Total	124	124	

=== South Dakota ===
All of the seats of the South Dakota Senate and the South Dakota House of Representatives were up for election in 2016. Republicans retained control of both chambers, maintaining a government trifecta.

South Dakota Senate
Party	Before	After	Change
Republican	27	29	▲2
Democratic	8	6	▼2
Total	35	35	

South Dakota House of Representatives
Party	Before	After	Change
Republican	58	60	▲2
Democratic	12	10	▼2
Total	70	70	

=== Tennessee ===
Half of the seats of the Tennessee Senate and all of the seats of the Tennessee House of Representatives were up for election in 2016. Republicans retained control of both chambers, maintaining a government trifecta.

Tennessee Senate
Party	Before	After	Change
Republican	28	28	Steady
Democratic	5	5	Steady
Total	33	33	

Tennessee House of Representatives
Party	Before	After	Change
Republican	73	74	▲1
Democratic	26	25	▼1
Total	99	99	

=== Texas ===
Half of the seats of the Texas Senate and all of the seats of the Texas House of Representatives were up for election in 2016. Republicans retained control of both chambers, maintaining a government trifecta.

Texas Senate
Party	Before	After	Change
Republican	20	20	Steady
Democratic	11	11	Steady
Total	31	31	

Texas House of Representatives
Party	Before	After	Change
Republican	99	95	▼4
Democratic	50	55	▲5
Independent	1	0	▼1
Total	150	150	

=== Utah ===
Half of the seats of the Utah State Senate and all of the seats of the Utah House of Representatives were up for election in 2016. Republicans retained control of both chambers, maintaining a government trifecta.

Utah State Senate
Party	Before	After	Change
Republican	23	24	▲1
Democratic	6	5	▼1
Total	29	29	

Utah House of Representatives
Party	Before	After	Change
Republican	63	62	▼1
Democratic	12	13	▲1
Total	75	75	

=== Vermont ===
All of the seats of the Vermont Senate and the Vermont House of Representatives were up for election in 2016. Democrats retained control of both chambers.

Vermont Senate
Party	Before	After	Change
Democratic	19	21	▲2
Republican	9	7	▼2
Progressive	2	2	Steady
Total	30	30	

Vermont House of Representatives
Party	Before	After	Change
Democratic	85	83	▼2
Republican	53	53	Steady
Progressive	6	7	▲1
Independent	6	7	▲1
Total	150	150	

=== Washington ===
Half of the seats of the Washington State Senate and all of the seats of the Washington House of Representatives were up for election in 2016. Democrats retained control of the state House, while Republicans maintained coalition control of the state Senate.

Washington State Senate
Party	Before	After	Change
Republican	25	24	▼1
Democratic	1 (Note: One Democrat caucused with the Republicans to give them a majority.)	1	▲1
Democratic	23	24	▲1
Total	49	49	

Washington House of Representatives
Party	Before	After	Change
Democratic	50	50	Steady
Republican	48	48	Steady
Total	98	98	

=== West Virginia ===
Half of the seats of the West Virginia Senate and all of the seats of the West Virginia House of Delegates were up for election in 2016. Republicans retained control of both chambers.

West Virginia Senate
Party	Before	After	Change
Republican	18	22	▲4
Democratic	16	12	▼4
Total	34	34	

West Virginia House of Delegates
Party	Before	After	Change
Republican	64	63	▼1
Democratic	36	37	▲1
Total	100	100	

=== Wisconsin ===
Half of the seats of the Wisconsin Senate and all of the seats of the Wisconsin State Assembly were up for election in 2016. Republicans retained control of both chambers.

Wisconsin Senate
Party	Before	After	Change
Republican	19	20	▲1
Democratic	14	13	▼1
Total	33	33	

Wisconsin State Assembly
Party	Before	After	Change
Republican	63	64	▲1
Democratic	36	35	▼1
Total	99	99	

=== Wyoming ===
Half of the seats of the Wyoming Senate and all of the seats of the Wyoming House of Representatives were up for election in 2016. Republicans retained control of both chambers, maintaining a government trifecta.

Wyoming Senate
Party	Before	After	Change
Republican	26	27	▲1
Democratic	4	3	▼1
Total	30	30	

Wyoming House of Representatives
Party	Before	After	Change
Republican	51	51	Steady
Democratic	9	9	Steady
Total	60	60	

== Territorial and federal district summaries ==
=== American Samoa ===
All of the seats of the American Samoa Senate and the American Samoa House of Representatives were up for election. Members of the Senate serve four-year terms, while members of the House of Representatives serve two-year terms. Gubernatorial and legislative elections are conducted on a nonpartisan basis in American Samoa.

=== Guam ===
All of the seats of the unicameral Legislature of Guam were up for election. All members of the legislature serve a two-year term. Democrats retained control of the legislature.

Guam Legislature
Party	Before	After	Change
Democratic	9	9	Steady
Republican	6	6	Steady
Total	15	15	

=== Northern Mariana Islands ===
A portion of the seats of the Northern Mariana Islands Senate, and all of the seats of the Northern Mariana Islands House of Representatives, were up for election. Members of the senate serve either four-year terms, while members of the house serve two-year terms. Republicans maintained control of the upper house, and won control of the lower house from Independents.

Northern Mariana Islands Senate
Party	Before	After	Change
Republican	6	7	▲1
Independent	3	2	▼1
Democratic	0	0	Steady
Total	9	9	

Northern Mariana Islands House of Representatives
Party	Before	After	Change
Republican	7	15	▲8
Democratic	0	0	Steady
Independent	13	5	▼8
Total	20	20	

=== Puerto Rico ===
All of the seats of the Senate of Puerto Rico and the House of Representatives of Puerto Rico are up for election. Members of the Senate and the House of Representatives both serve four-year terms. The New Progressive Party won control of both chambers, from the Popular Democratic Party.

Puerto Rico Senate
Party	Before	After	Change
Popular Democratic	18	7	▼11
New Progressive	8	21	▲13
Puerto Rican Independence	1	1	Steady
Independent	0	1	▲1
Total	27	27	

Puerto Rico House of Representatives
Party	Before	After	Change
Popular Democratic	28	16	▼12
New Progressive	23	34	▲11
Puerto Rican Independence	0	1	▲1
Total	51	51	

=== U.S. Virgin Islands ===
All of the seats of the unicameral Legislature of the Virgin Islands were up for election. All members of the legislature serve a two-year term. Democrats retained control of the legislature.

Virgin Islands Legislature
Party	Before	After	Change
Democratic	11	11	Steady
Independent	4	4	Steady
Total	15	15	

=== Washington, D.C. ===
The Council of the District of Columbia serves as the legislative branch of the federal district of Washington, D.C. Half of the council seats are up for election. Council members serve four-year terms. Democrats retained supermajority control of the council.

District of Columbia Council
Party	Before	After	Change
Democratic	11	11	Steady
Independent	2	2	Steady
Total	13	13	

== Special elections ==
=== California ===
District		Incumbent			This race	
Chamber	No.	Representative	Party	First elected	Results	Candidates
Assembly	31	Henry Perea	Democratic	2014	Incumbent resigned December 31, 2015, to become a lobbyist. New member elected April 5, 2016. Democratic hold.	▌ ✓ Joaquin Arambula (Democratic) 53.8%; ▌ Clint Olivier (Republican) 40.3%; ▌ Ted Miller (Democratic) 5.9%

== See also ==
- 2016 United States presidential election
- 2016 United States Senate elections
- 2016 United States House of Representatives elections
- 2016 United States gubernatorial elections
