= Annalisa Perea =

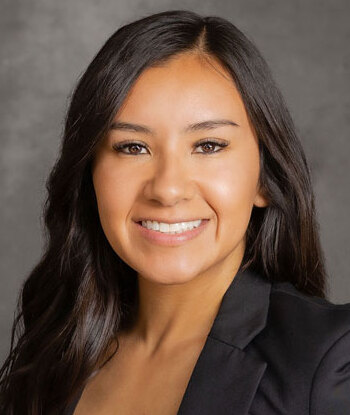
- Official portrait, 2023

Member-elect of the California State Assembly from the 31st district
- Assuming office December 7, 2026
- Succeeding: Joaquin Arambula

Member of the Fresno City Council from the 1st district
- Incumbent
- Assumed office 2023

Personal details
- Born: 1987 (age 39)
- Party: Democratic
- Relatives: Henry Perea (brother)
- Education: California Polytechnic State University, San Luis Obispo (BS)

Annalisa Perea is an American politician who is Member-elect of the California State Assembly for the 31st district. She was previously elected to the Fresno City Council in District 1 in 2022. She is the sister of Henry Perea, who also was a Fresno City Councillor and Assemblymember.
