= Rose Ann Vuich =

American politician (1927–2001)

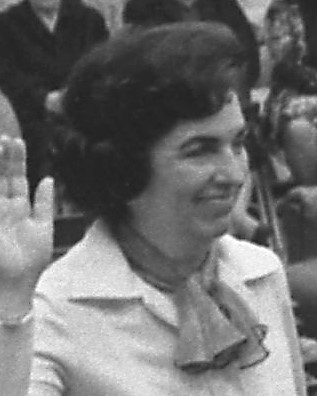
- Vuich in 1976

Member of the California Senate from the 15th district
- In office December 6, 1976 – November 30, 1992
- Preceded by: Howard Way
- Succeeded by: Henry J. Mello

Personal details
- Born: January 27, 1927 Cutler, California, U.S.
- Died: August 30, 2001 (aged 74) Dinuba, California, U.S.
- Party: Democratic
- Occupation: Accountant

Rose Ann Vuich (January 27, 1927 – August 30, 2001) was a second generation Serbian-American woman who served as a member of the California State Senate from 1976 until 1992. At age 50, she became the first female member of the California State Senate. She was a Democrat.

== Early life ==
Vuich was born in Cutler, California, on January 27, 1927. Originally from Herzegovina, Vuich's parents settled in Cutler to farm citrus, olive and fruit trees. A type of white peach they grew was later named the "Rose Ann" in her honor.

After graduating from Orosi Union High School, now Orosi High School, Vuich moved to the nearby farm town of Dinuba, California and became a tax accountant. She later became a member of the Alta District Hospital Board and President of the Dinuba Chamber of Commerce.

== Political career ==
=== 1976 State Senate Election ===
Not many initially took notice when she was chosen to replace the presumed Democratic candidate for a vacant state Senate seat in 1976, as the area voted Republican in most elections. However, she scored one of the biggest upsets in the state that year when she narrowly defeated Ernest Mobley, a 10 year Republican Assemblyman, in the general election.

With very little money and no support from the Democratic Caucus, who viewed Vuich as "sincere, but naïve," Vuich scraped enough together for a thirty-second attack ad against her opponent for voting to fund new highways while failing to appropriate the funds needed for a highway in their own district. Her critique of his "freeway to nowhere" caught on quickly, and the "Freeway Lady" swung enough votes to win the race.

=== The First Woman Senator ===
Despite nominating her, the Democratic Caucus believed that Vuich's grassroots understanding of the district would prove more old-fashioned than practical, and that a woman would never succeed in Senate politics. Over the next sixteen years, Vuich would prove that her graciousness was not a sign of weakness, and that being a woman would not bar her from providing daring leadership.

Following her election, Vuich quickly became popular in her district for her unassuming manner and her political independence. She broke with her party on agricultural and law enforcement issues on several occasions. Her colleagues tolerated that because of the conservative constituency she represented.

She was equally willing to stand up to conservatives. Finding delight in keeping both Republican and Democrats off-balance, made a habit of not letting anyone know how she would vote until it was time for the roll call. This ultimately angered the popular Republican Governor George Deukmejian in 1989 when she voted against confirming his chosen appointee for state treasurer, Dan Lungren, when the post became vacant.

As the state's first female state Senator, Vuich would ring a bell whenever her fellow Senators addressed the collective members of the Senate as "Gentlemen," to remind them that the chamber was no longer exclusively male. It was also her election that led to the creation of the first woman's bathroom in the state capitol. The bathroom, located behind the Senate floor, is still referred to as "The Rose Room."

=== Legislative Accomplishments ===
As a legislator, Vuich traveled extensively and grew to be a forceful advocate for Central Valley agriculture. She was known to bring fresh produce to the Senate, withholding it from her colleagues until she was given the chance to explain how beneficial the agricultural industry was to the overall health of the state. She ultimately authored legislation that created the California Trade and Commerce Agency.

She won reelection by impressive margins—72% in 1980, and 76% in 1984. In her final election, in 1988, she ran unopposed. When she announced that she would not seek a fifth term in 1991, citing her brother's ailing health and reapportionment, it was clear to her colleagues that it was her own health that was ailing her. Vuich retired from politics in 1992.

== Death and legacy ==
At the age of 74, Vuich died in her home in Dinuba on August 30, 2001. The cause of death was complications of Parkinson's and Alzheimer's disease. Vuich, who never married, is survived by her cousins.

One of her former staffers, Cal Dooley, later became a United States representative from 1991 until 2005, representing a large slice of the area Vuich represented in the state senate.

The Rose Anne Vuich Ethical Leadership Award is presented annually by the Kenneth L. Maddy Institute at California State University, Fresno to a person who has demonstrated "integrity, strength of character, exemplary ethical behavior, ability to build consensus, serving the public interest and vision for enhancing the community." Recipients of the Vuich Award include: Juan Arambula (2002) and Cal Dooley (2004).

The interchange of State Route 41 and State Route 180 in Fresno, California is named the Rose Ann Vuich Interchange, and in 2006, Hearing Room 2040 at the California State Capitol was renamed the Rose Ann Vuich Hearing Room. Rose Ann Vuich Park, named in her honor, is located in the city of Dinuba, California.
