= 2016 California State Assembly election =

- November 8, 2016

All 80 seats in the California State Assembly 41 seats needed for a majority
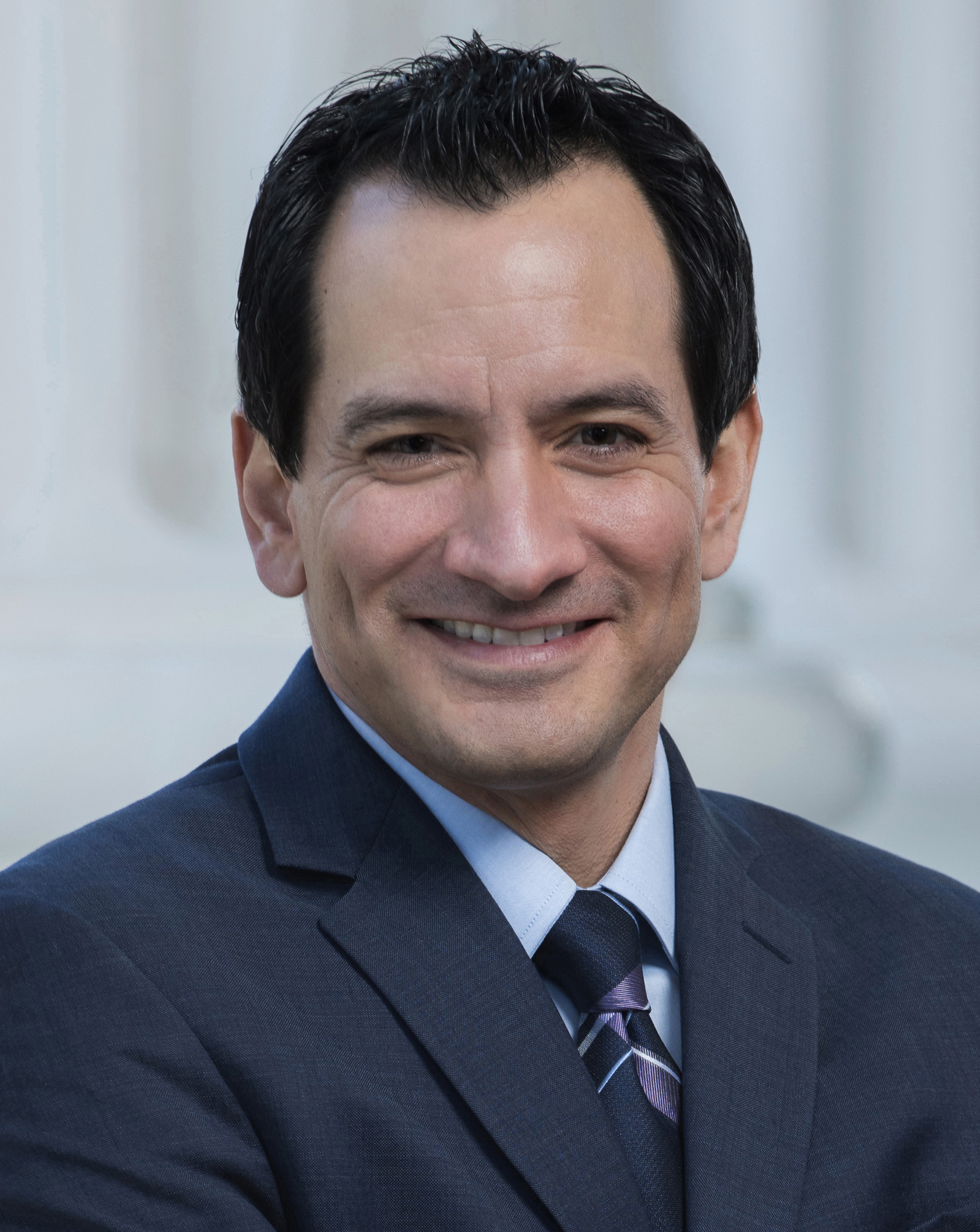

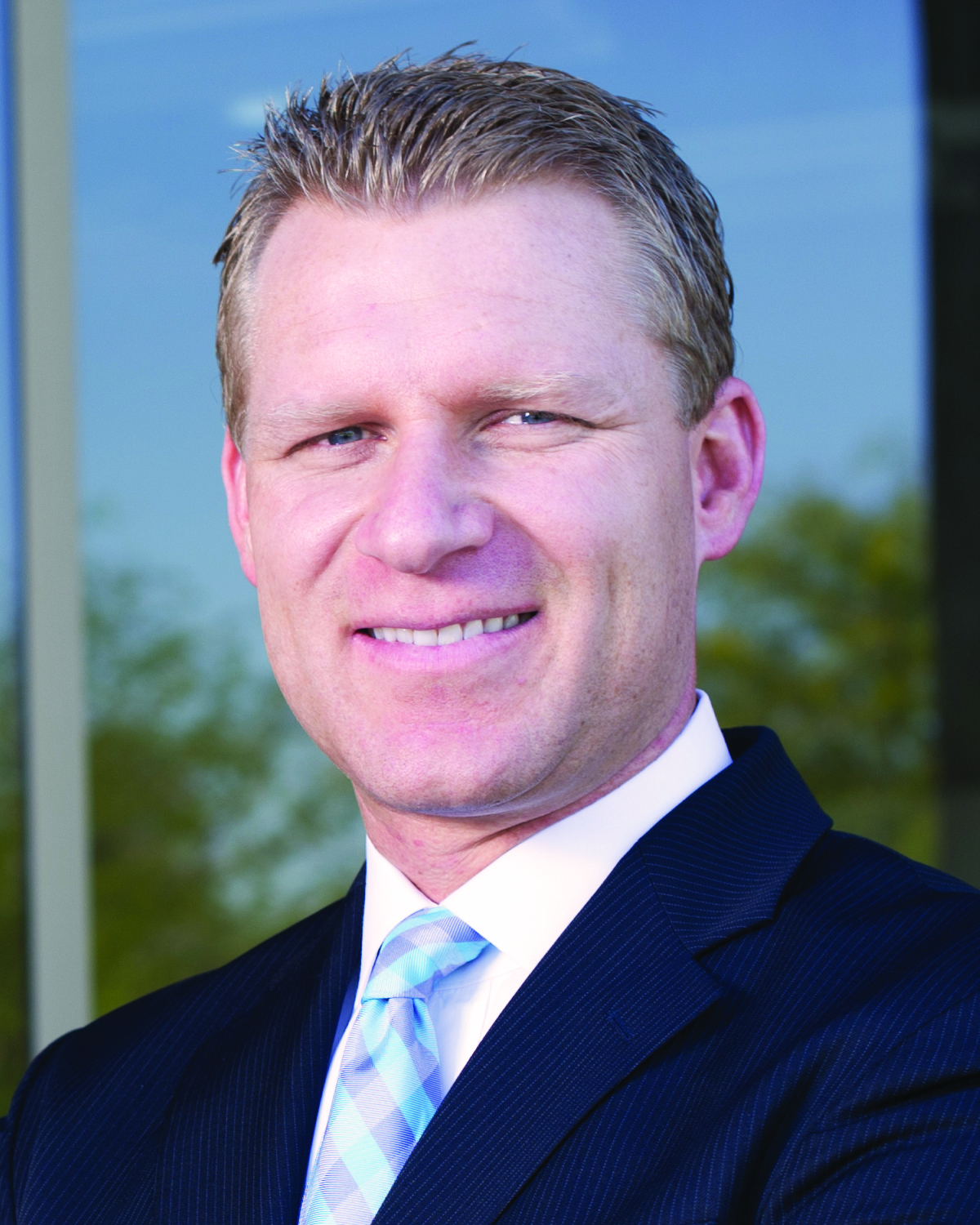
	Majority party	Minority party
Leader	Anthony Rendon	Chad Mayes
Party	Democratic	Republican
Leader since	March 7, 2016	January 4, 2016
Leader's seat	63rd–Paramount	42nd–Yucca Valley
Last election	52 seats, 54.54%	28 seats, 44.32%
Seats won	55	25
Seat change	▲3	▼3
Popular vote	7,929,866	4,849,783
Percentage	61.08%	37.36%
Swing	▲6.54%	▼6.96%
- Democratic gain Democratic hold Republican hold 50–60% 60–70% 70–80% 80–90% >90% 50–60% 60–70% 70–80%
Speaker before election
Anthony Rendon
Democratic
Elected Speaker
Anthony Rendon
Democratic

The 2016 California State Assembly election was held on Tuesday, November 8, 2016, with the primary election held on June 7, 2016. Voters in the 80 districts of the California State Assembly elected their representatives. The elections coincided with the elections for other offices, including for U.S. President and the state senate.

Benefiting from the large Democratic turnout due to the general election, the California Democratic Party made gains by ousting three Republican incumbents in the 60th, 65th, and 66th districts, thus regaining the two-thirds supermajority that they had lost in the previous elections.

== Overview ==
California State Assembly election, 2016 Primary election — June 7, 2016
Party	Votes	Percentage	Candidates	Advancing to general	Seats contesting
Democratic	4,463,500	62.45%	123	86	75
Republican	2,582,229	36.13%	107	68	64
No party preference	75,477	1.06%	7	1	1
Libertarian	24,494	0.34%	10	4	4
American Independent	1,873	0.03%	1	0	0
Valid votes	7,147,573	83.61%	—	—	—
Invalid votes	1,400,728	16.39%	—	—	—
Totals	8,548,301	100.00%	248	159	—
Voter turnout	47.72%				

California State Assembly election, 2016 General election — November 8, 2016
Party	Votes	Percentage	Seats	+/–
Democratic	7,929,866	61.08%	55	▲3
Republican	4,849,783	37.36%	25	▼3
Libertarian	130,798	1.01%	0	0
No party preference	71,944	0.55%	0	0
Valid votes	12,982,391	88.86%	—	—
Invalid votes	1,628,118	11.14%	—	—
Totals	14,610,509	100.00%	80	—
Voter turnout	75.27%			

↓
55	25
Democratic	Republican

== Predictions ==
Source	Ranking	As of
Governing	Safe D	October 12, 2016

== Results ==
Source: Official results.

=== District 1 ===
California's 1st State Assembly district election, 2016
Primary election
Party	Candidate	Votes	%
Republican	Brian Dahle (incumbent)	103,500	99.6
Libertarian	Donn Coenen (write-in)	446	0.4
Total votes		103,946	100.0
General election
Republican	Brian Dahle (incumbent)	148,657	73.8
Libertarian	Donn Coenen	52,871	26.2
Total votes		201,528	100.0
Republican hold			

=== District 2 ===
California's 2nd State Assembly district election, 2016
Primary election
Party	Candidate	Votes	%
Democratic	Jim Wood (incumbent)	102,308	99.9
Libertarian	Ken Anton (write-in)	56	0.1
Total votes		102,364	100.0
General election
Democratic	Jim Wood (incumbent)	138,020	72.9
Libertarian	Ken Anton	51,245	27.1
Total votes		189,265	100.0
Democratic hold			

=== District 3 ===
California's 3rd State Assembly district election, 2016
Primary election
Party	Candidate	Votes	%
Republican	James Gallagher (incumbent)	66,686	61.0
Democratic	Edward Ritchie	42,700	39.0
Democratic	Bryce Corron (write-in)	12	0.0
Total votes		109,398	100.0
General election
Republican	James Gallagher (incumbent)	108,910	63.0
Democratic	Edward Ritchie	63,867	37.0
Total votes		172,777	100.0
Republican hold			

=== District 4 ===
California's 4th State Assembly district election, 2016
Primary election
Party	Candidate	Votes	%
Democratic	Cecilia Aguiar-Curry	36,043	29.2
Republican	Charlie Schaupp	35,454	28.7
Democratic	Dan Wolk	31,405	25.4
Democratic	Don Saylor	18,284	14.8
Democratic	Elmer Mark Kropp	2,281	1.8
Total votes		123,467	100.0
General election
Democratic	Cecilia Aguiar-Curry	118,772	63.5
Republican	Charlie Schaupp	68,170	36.5
Total votes		186,942	100.0
Democratic hold			

=== District 5 ===
California's 5th State Assembly district election, 2016
Primary election
Party	Candidate	Votes	%
Republican	Frank Bigelow (incumbent)	73,180	60.0
Democratic	Robert Carabas	27,190	22.3
Democratic	Kai Ellsworth	11,313	9.3
No party preference	Mark Belden	10,289	8.4
Total votes		121,972	100.0
General election
Republican	Frank Bigelow (incumbent)	121,644	64.5
Democratic	Robert Carabas	66,949	35.5
Total votes		188,593	100.0
Democratic hold			

=== District 6 ===
California's 6th State Assembly district election, 2016
Primary election
Party	Candidate	Votes	%
Democratic	Brian Caples	26,707	19.8
Republican	Kevin Kiley	22,019	16.3
Republican	Andy Pugno	19,033	14.1
Democratic	John Edward Z'berg	15,884	11.8
Republican	Cristi Nelson	12,834	9.5
Republican	Bill Halldin	12,342	9.2
Republican	Kevin Hanley	8,989	6.7
Republican	Ron "Mik" Mikulaco	8,239	6.1
Republican	Suzanne Jones	4,397	3.3
No party preference	"Bo" Bogdan I. Ambrozewicz	2,634	2.0
Republican	Gabriel L. Hydrick	1,649	1.2
Total votes		134,727	100.0
General election
Republican	Kevin Kiley	149,415	64.6
Democratic	Brian Caples	81,919	35.4
Total votes		231,334	100.0
Republican hold			

=== District 7 ===
California's 7th State Assembly district election, 2016
Primary election
Party	Candidate	Votes	%
Democratic	Kevin McCarty (incumbent)	69,901	99.5
Republican	Ryan K. Brown (write-in)	254	0.4
Libertarian	Janine Kloss (write-in)	51	0.1
Republican	Ralph Merletti (write-in)	43	0.1
Total votes		70,249	100.0
General election
Democratic	Kevin McCarty (incumbent)	111,112	69.8
Republican	Ryan K. Brown	48,097	30.2
Total votes		159,209	100.0
Democratic hold			

=== District 8 ===
California's 8th State Assembly district election, 2016
Primary election
Party	Candidate	Votes	%
Democratic	Ken Cooley (incumbent)	61,704	58.3
Republican	Nick Bloise	36,630	34.6
Libertarian	Janice Marlae Bonser	7,588	7.2
Total votes		105,922	100.0
General election
Democratic	Ken Cooley (incumbent)	104,552	57.0
Republican	Nick Bloise	78,848	43.0
Total votes		183,400	100.0
Democratic hold			

=== District 9 ===
California's 9th State Assembly district election, 2016
Primary election
Party	Candidate	Votes	%
Democratic	Jim Cooper (incumbent)	64,879	69.9
Republican	Timothy Scott Gorsulowsky	27,924	30.1
Total votes		92,803	100.0
General election
Democratic	Jim Cooper (incumbent)	109,979	66.8
Republican	Timothy Scott Gorsulowsky	54,729	33.2
Total votes		164,708	100.0
Democratic hold			

=== District 10 ===
California's 10th State Assembly district election, 2016
Primary election
Party	Candidate	Votes	%
Democratic	Marc Levine (incumbent)	100,578	65.4
Democratic	Veronica "Roni" Jacobi	27,232	17.7
Republican	Gregory Allen	26,081	16.9
Total votes		153,891	100.0
General election
Democratic	Marc Levine (incumbent)	140,207	68.2
Democratic	Veronica "Roni" Jacobi	65,355	31.8
Total votes		205,562	100.0
Democratic hold			

=== District 11 ===
California's 11th State Assembly district election, 2016
Primary election
Party	Candidate	Votes	%
Democratic	Jim Frazier (incumbent)	62,952	65.9
Republican	Dave Miller	32,545	34.1
Total votes		95,497	100.0
General election
Democratic	Jim Frazier (incumbent)	111,592	64.2
Republican	Dave Miller	62,227	35.8
Total votes		173,819	100.0
Democratic hold			

=== District 12 ===
California's 12th State Assembly district election, 2016
Primary election
Party	Candidate	Votes	%
Republican	Ken Vogel	23,678	25.6
Republican	Heath Flora	21,484	23.2
Democratic	Virginia Madueno	19,764	21.4
Democratic	Harinder Grewal	17,245	18.6
Republican	Cindy Marks	10,397	11.2
Total votes		92,568	100.0
General election
Republican	Heath Flora	81,680	52.3
Republican	Ken Vogel	74,433	47.7
Total votes		156,113	100.0
Republican hold			

=== District 13 ===
California's 13th State Assembly district election, 2016
Primary election
Party	Candidate	Votes	%
Democratic	Susan Eggman (incumbent)	39,608	53.4
Republican	Kevin Lincoln	14,284	19.3
Democratic	K. Jeffrey Jafri	11,728	15.8
Republican	Jacob "Jake" Souza	8,491	11.5
Total votes		74,111	100.0
General election
Democratic	Susan Eggman (incumbent)	86,315	64.8
Republican	Kevin Lincoln	46,883	35.2
Total votes		133,198	100.0
Democratic hold			

=== District 14 ===
California's 14th State Assembly district election, 2016
Primary election
Party	Candidate	Votes	%
Democratic	Mae Torlakson	34,535	32.3
Democratic	Tim Grayson	33,712	31.6
Republican	Debora Allen	27,826	26.1
Democratic	Harmesh Kumar	10,694	10.0
Total votes		106,767	100.0
General election
Democratic	Tim Grayson	107,653	61.5
Democratic	Mae Torlakson	67,300	38.5
Total votes		174,953	100.0
Democratic hold			

=== District 15 ===
California's 15th State Assembly district election, 2016
Primary election
Party	Candidate	Votes	%
Democratic	Tony Thurmond (incumbent)	124,136	91.1
Republican	Claire Chiara	12,083	8.9
Total votes		136,219	100.0
General election
Democratic	Tony Thurmond (incumbent)	189,530	89.4
Republican	Claire Chiara	22,528	10.6
Total votes		212,058	100.0
Democratic hold			

=== District 16 ===
California's 16th State Assembly district election, 2016
Primary election
Party	Candidate	Votes	%
Republican	Catharine Baker (incumbent)	71,906	53.2
Democratic	Cheryl Cook-Kallio	63,307	46.8
Total votes		135,213	100.0
General election
Republican	Catharine Baker (incumbent)	129,585	55.9
Democratic	Cheryl Cook-Kallio	102,290	44.1
Total votes		231,875	100.0
Republican hold			

=== District 17 ===
California's 17th State Assembly district election, 2016
Primary election
Party	Candidate	Votes	%
Democratic	David Chiu (incumbent)	114,904	88.5
Republican	Matthew Del Carlo	14,891	11.5
Total votes		129,795	100.0
General election
Democratic	David Chiu (incumbent)	172,153	86.3
Republican	Matthew Del Carlo	27,417	13.7
Total votes		199,570	100.0
Democratic hold			

=== District 18 ===
California's 18th State Assembly district election, 2016
Primary election
Party	Candidate	Votes	%
Democratic	Rob Bonta (incumbent)	98,202	89.1
Republican	Roseann Slonsky-Breault	12,057	10.9
Total votes		110,259	100.0
General election
Democratic	Rob Bonta (incumbent)	156,163	87.0
Republican	Roseann Slonsky-Breault	23,273	13.0
Total votes		179,436	100.0
Democratic hold			

=== District 19 ===
California's 19th State Assembly district election, 2016
Primary election
Party	Candidate	Votes	%
Democratic	Phil Ting (incumbent)	95,046	83.6
Republican	Carlos "Chuck" Taylor	18,666	16.4
Democratic	Daniel C. Kappler (write-in)	22	0.0
Total votes		113,734	100.0
General election
Democratic	Phil Ting (incumbent)	150,052	80.1
Republican	Carlos "Chuck" Taylor	37,180	19.9
Total votes		187,232	100.0
Democratic hold			

=== District 20 ===
California's 20th State Assembly district election, 2016
Primary election
Party	Candidate	Votes	%
Democratic	Bill Quirk (incumbent)	66,526	77.7
Republican	Luis A. Wong	19,078	22.3
Total votes		85,604	100.0
General election
Democratic	Bill Quirk (incumbent)	114,001	74.3
Republican	Luis A. Wong	39,507	25.7
Total votes		153,508	100.0
Democratic hold			

=== District 21 ===
California's 21st State Assembly district election, 2016
Primary election
Party	Candidate	Votes	%
Democratic	Adam Gray (incumbent)	43,874	66.8
Republican	Greg Opinski	21,754	33.1
Republican	Brien J. Rahilly (write-in)	36	0.1
Total votes		65,664	100.0
General election
Democratic	Adam Gray (incumbent)	85,990	69.8
Republican	Greg Opinski	37,230	30.2
Total votes		123,220	100.0
Democratic hold			

=== District 22 ===
California's 22nd State Assembly district election, 2016
Primary election
Party	Candidate	Votes	%
Democratic	Kevin Mullin (incumbent)	85,682	76.2
Republican	Art Kiesel	14,998	13.3
Republican	Mark Gilham	11,748	10.4
Total votes		112,428	100.0
General election
Democratic	Kevin Mullin (incumbent)	148,289	74.4
Republican	Art Kiesel	51,046	25.6
Total votes		199,335	100.0
Democratic hold			

=== District 23 ===
California's 23rd State Assembly district election, 2016
Primary election
Party	Candidate	Votes	%
Republican	Jim Patterson (incumbent)	73,686	77.4
Republican	Gwen L. Morris	21,522	22.6
Total votes		95,208	100.0
General election
Republican	Jim Patterson (incumbent)	125,123	75.9
Republican	Gwen L. Morris	39,656	24.1
Total votes		164,809	100.0
Republican hold			

=== District 24 ===
California's 24th State Assembly district election, 2016
Primary election
Party	Candidate	Votes	%
Democratic	Marc Berman	30,649	28.2
Democratic	Vicki Veenker	24,201	22.2
Republican	Peter Ohtaki	21,525	19.8
Democratic	Barry Chang	11,890	10.9
Democratic	Mike Kasperzak	11,343	10.4
Libertarian	John M. Inks	4,546	4.2
No party preference	Jay Blas Jacob Cabrera	2,603	2.4
Democratic	Sea Reddy	2,102	1.9
Total votes		108,859	100.0
General election
Democratic	Marc Berman	92,419	54.4
Democratic	Vicki Veenker	77,362	45.6
Total votes		164,809	100.0
Democratic hold			

=== District 25 ===
California's 25th State Assembly district election, 2016
Primary election
Party	Candidate	Votes	%
Democratic	Kansen Chu (incumbent)	61,980	75.5
Republican	Bob Brunton	20,146	24.5
Total votes		82,126	100.0
General election
Democratic	Kansen Chu (incumbent)	107,821	72.8
Republican	Bob Brunton	40,280	27.2
Total votes		148,101	100.0
Democratic hold			

=== District 26 ===
California's 26th State Assembly district election, 2016
Primary election
Party	Candidate	Votes	%
Republican	Devon Mathis (incumbent)	28,563	42.4
Democratic	Ruben Macareno	20,536	30.5
Republican	Rudy Mendoza	18,216	27.1
Total votes		67,315	100.0
General election
Republican	Devon Mathis (incumbent)	76,289	63.3
Democratic	Ruben Macareno	44,205	36.7
Total votes		120,494	100.0
Republican hold			

=== District 27 ===
California's 27th State Assembly district election, 2016
Primary election
Party	Candidate	Votes	%
Democratic	Madison Nguyen	27,453	34.3
Democratic	Ash Kalra	15,843	19.8
Republican	Van Le	11,726	14.7
Democratic	Andres Quintero	10,922	13.7
Democratic	Cong Thanh Do	4,869	6.1
Democratic	Darcie Green	4,769	6.0
Democratic	Esau Herrera	4,342	5.4
Total votes		79,924	100.0
General election
Democratic	Ash Kalra	71,696	53.2
Democratic	Madison Nguyen	63,048	46.8
Total votes		134,744	100.0
Democratic hold			

=== District 28 ===
California's 28th State Assembly district election, 2016
Primary election
Party	Candidate	Votes	%
Democratic	Evan Low (incumbent)	83,038	71.5
Republican	Nicholas Sclavos	33,154	28.5
Total votes		116,192	100.0
General election
Democratic	Evan Low (incumbent)	136,547	70.0
Republican	Nicholas Sclavos	58,641	30.0
Total votes		195,188	100.0
Democratic hold			

=== District 29 ===
California's 29th State Assembly district election, 2016
Primary election
Party	Candidate	Votes	%
Democratic	Mark Stone (incumbent)	107,770	75.0
Republican	Sierra Roberts	35,934	25.0
Total votes		143,704	100.0
General election
Democratic	Mark Stone (incumbent)	156,703	72.2
Republican	Sierra Roberts	60,245	27.8
Total votes		216,948	100.0
Democratic hold			

=== District 30 ===
California's 30th State Assembly district election, 2016
Primary election
Party	Candidate	Votes	%
Democratic	Anna Caballero	37,505	46.1
Democratic	Karina Cervantez Alejo	21,158	26.0
Republican	Georgia Acosta	12,662	15.6
Republican	John M. Nevill	9,949	12.2
Total votes		81,274	100.0
General election
Democratic	Anna Caballero	79,885	62.5
Democratic	Karina Cervantez Alejo	47,998	37.5
Total votes		127,883	100.0
Democratic hold			

=== District 31 ===
California's 31st State Assembly district election, 2016
Primary election
Party	Candidate	Votes	%
Democratic	Joaquin Arambula (incumbent)	31,600	57.7
Republican	Clint Olivier	19,605	35.8
Democratic	Ted Miller	3,582	6.5
Total votes		54,787	100.0
General election
Democratic	Joaquin Arambula (incumbent)	62,404	63.8
Republican	Clint Olivier	35,454	36.2
Total votes		97,858	100.0
Democratic hold			

=== District 32 ===
California's 32nd State Assembly district election, 2016
Primary election
Party	Candidate	Votes	%
Democratic	Rudy Salas (incumbent)	30,806	98.9
Republican	Manuel Ramirez (write-in)	334	1.1
Total votes		31,140	100.0
General election
Democratic	Rudy Salas (incumbent)	53,056	65.1
Republican	Manuel Ramirez	28,502	34.9
Total votes		81,558	100.0
Democratic hold			

=== District 33 ===
California's 33rd State Assembly district election, 2016
Primary election
Party	Candidate	Votes	%
Republican	Jay Obernolte (incumbent)	43,526	60.7
Democratic	Scott Markovich	28,220	39.3
Total votes		71,746	100.0
General election
Republican	Jay Obernolte (incumbent)	84,000	60.60
Democratic	Scott Markovich	56,086	39.4
Total votes		140,086	100.0
Republican hold			

=== District 34 ===
California's 34th State Assembly district election, 2016
Primary election
Party	Candidate	Votes	%
Republican	Vince Fong	57,915	60.3
Democratic	Perrin Swanlund	23,429	24.4
Republican	Ernie Gollehon	8,779	9.1
Republican	Michael Garcia Biglay	5,886	6.1
Total votes		96,009	100.0
General election
Republican	Vince Fong	123,959	73.2
Democratic	Perrin Swanlund	45,305	26.8
Total votes		169,264	100.0
Republican hold			

=== District 35 ===
California's 35th State Assembly district election, 2016
Primary election
Party	Candidate	Votes	%
Democratic	Dawn Ortiz-Legg	55,577	45.0
Republican	Jordan Cunningham	45,750	37.0
Republican	Steve Lebard	18,170	14.7
Libertarian	Dominic Robert Rubini	4,142	3.4
Total votes		123,639	100.0
General election
Republican	Jordan Cunningham	105,247	54.7
Democratic	Dawn Ortiz-Legg	87,168	45.3
Total votes		192,415	100.0
Republican hold			

=== District 36 ===
California's 36th State Assembly district election, 2016
Primary election
Party	Candidate	Votes	%
Republican	Tom Lackey (incumbent)	35,019	48.2
Democratic	Steve Fox	21,541	29.6
Democratic	Darren W. Parker	11,236	15.5
Democratic	Ollie M. McCaulley	4,891	6.7
Total votes		72,687	100.0
General election
Republican	Tom Lackey (incumbent)	77,801	53.1
Democratic	Steve Fox	68,755	46.9
Total votes		146,556	100.0
Republican hold			

=== District 37 ===
California's 37th State Assembly district election, 2016
Primary election
Party	Candidate	Votes	%
Democratic	Monique Limón	83,862	65.9
No party preference	Edward Fuller	43,420	34.1
Total votes		127,282	100.0
General election
Democratic	Monique Limón	128,344	64.1
No party preference	Edward Fuller	71,944	35.9
Total votes		200,288	100.0
Democratic hold			

=== District 38 ===
California's 38th State Assembly district election, 2016
Primary election
Party	Candidate	Votes	%
Democratic	Christy Smith	44,755	44.7
Republican	Dante Acosta	36,236	36.2
Republican	Tyler Izen	10,998	11.0
Republican	Jarrod R. Degonia	8,215	8.2
Total votes		100,204	100.0
General election
Republican	Dante Acosta	102,977	52.9
Democratic	Christy Smith	91,801	47.1
Total votes		194,778	100.0
Republican hold			

=== District 39 ===
California's 39th State Assembly district election, 2016
Primary election
Party	Candidate	Votes	%
Democratic	Raul Bocanegra	30,119	44.4
Democratic	Patty López (incumbent)	18,472	27.2
Democratic	Joel Fajardo	6,831	10.1
Democratic	Joanne Fernandez	4,538	6.7
Democratic	Mina Creswell	4,418	6.5
Democratic	Kevin James Suscavage	3,489	5.1
Total votes		67,867	100.0
General election
Democratic	Raul Bocanegra	74,834	60.1
Democratic	Patty López (incumbent)	49,649	39.9
Total votes		124,483	100.0
Democratic hold			

=== District 40 ===
California's 40th State Assembly district election, 2016
Primary election
Party	Candidate	Votes	%
Democratic	Abigail Medina	39,583	51.5
Republican	Marc Steinorth (incumbent)	37,339	48.5
Total votes		76,922	100.0
General election
Republican	Marc Steinorth (incumbent)	76,537	50.6
Democratic	Abigail Medina	74,589	49.4
Total votes		151,126	100.0
Republican hold			

=== District 41 ===
California's 41st State Assembly district election, 2016
Primary election
Party	Candidate	Votes	%
Democratic	Chris Holden (incumbent)	66,951	59.2
Republican	Casey C. Higgins	30,017	26.6
Republican	Dan M. Taylor	8,891	7.9
No party preference	Alan S. Reynolds	7,143	6.3
Total votes		113,002	100.0
General election
Democratic	Chris Holden (incumbent)	120,633	60.5
Republican	Casey C. Higgins	78,817	39.5
Total votes		199,450	100.0
Democratic hold			

=== District 42 ===
California's 42nd State Assembly district election, 2016
Primary election
Party	Candidate	Votes	%
Republican	Chad Mayes (incumbent)	49,580	50.8
Democratic	Greg Rodriguez	40,446	41.4
Libertarian	Jeff Hewitt	7,601	7.8
Total votes		97,627	100.0
General election
Republican	Chad Mayes (incumbent)	97,864	57.4
Democratic	Greg Rodriguez	72,581	42.6
Total votes		170,445	100.0
Republican hold			

=== District 43 ===
California's 43rd State Assembly district election, 2016
Primary election
Party	Candidate	Votes	%
Democratic	Laura Friedman	33,276	31.9
Democratic	Ardy Kassakhian	25,357	24.3
Republican	Mark MacCarley	16,551	15.9
Democratic	Andrew J. Blumenfield	13,309	12.8
Republican	Alexandra A. Bustamante	6,524	6.3
Democratic	Dennis R. Bullock	4,294	4.1
Democratic	Rajiv Dalal	3,173	3.0
American Independent	Aaron Cervantes	1,873	1.8
Total votes		104,357	100.0
General election
Democratic	Laura Friedman	106,186	64.5
Democratic	Ardy Kassakhian	58,561	35.5
Total votes		164,747	100.0
Democratic hold			

=== District 44 ===
California's 44th State Assembly district election, 2016
Primary election
Party	Candidate	Votes	%
Democratic	Jacqui Irwin (incumbent)	63,992	60.9
Republican	Kerry J. Nelson	41,145	39.1
Total votes		105,137	100.0
General election
Democratic	Jacqui Irwin (incumbent)	107,084	59.0
Republican	Kerry J. Nelson	74,417	41.0
Total votes		181,501	100.0
Democratic hold			

=== District 45 ===
California's 45th State Assembly district election, 2016
Primary election
Party	Candidate	Votes	%
Democratic	Matt Dababneh (incumbent)	42,135	49.3
Republican	Jerry Kowal	22,899	26.8
Democratic	Doug Kriegel	20,387	23.9
Total votes		85,421	100.0
General election
Democratic	Matt Dababneh (incumbent)	111,148	66.4
Republican	Jerry Kowal	56,257	33.6
Total votes		167,405	100.0
Democratic hold			

=== District 46 ===
California's 46th State Assembly district election, 2016
Primary election
Party	Candidate	Votes	%
Democratic	Adrin Nazarian (incumbent)	51,535	99.6
Democratic	Angela Rupert (write-in)	131	0.3
Republican	Roxanne Beckford Hoge (write-in)	88	0.2
Total votes		51,754	100.0
General election
Democratic	Adrin Nazarian (incumbent)	77,587	56.1
Democratic	Angela Rupert	60,658	43.9
Total votes		138,245	100.0
Democratic hold			

=== District 47 ===
California's 47th State Assembly district election, 2016
Primary election
Party	Candidate	Votes	%
Democratic	Cheryl Brown (incumbent)	25,165	44.1
Democratic	Eloise Reyes	20,342	35.6
Republican	Aissa Chanel Sanchez	11,613	20.3
Total votes		57,120	100.0
General election
Democratic	Eloise Reyes	62,432	54.6
Democratic	Cheryl Brown (incumbent)	51,994	45.4
Total votes		114,426	100.0
Democratic hold			

=== District 48 ===
California's 48th State Assembly district election, 2016
Primary election
Party	Candidate	Votes	%
Republican	Cory Ellenson	18,547	26.4
Democratic	Blanca Rubio	17,941	25.5
Democratic	Bryan Urias	16,178	23.0
Democratic	Manuel Lozano	11,510	16.4
Democratic	Armando Barajas	6,129	8.7
Total votes		70,305	100.0
General election
Democratic	Blanca Rubio	87,321	64.1
Republican	Cory Ellenson	48,922	35.9
Total votes		136,243	100.0
Democratic hold			

=== District 49 ===
California's 49th State Assembly district election, 2016
Primary election
Party	Candidate	Votes	%
Democratic	Ed Chau (incumbent)	44,922	99.5
Republican	Peter Amundson, Jr.(write-in)	188	0.4
Libertarian	Matthew "Boomer" Shannon (write-in)	25	0.1
Total votes		45,135	100.0
General election
Democratic	Ed Chau (incumbent)	82,964	70.0
Republican	Peter Amundson, Jr.	35,533	30.0
Total votes		118,497	100.0
Democratic hold			

=== District 50 ===
California's 50th State Assembly district election, 2016
Primary election
Party	Candidate	Votes	%
Democratic	Richard Bloom (incumbent)	92,315	79.6
Republican	Matthew Gene Craffey	23,613	20.4
Total votes		115,928	100.0
General election
Democratic	Richard Bloom (incumbent)	158,967	74.6
Republican	Matthew Gene Craffey	54,016	25.4
Total votes		212,983	100.0
Democratic hold			

=== District 51 ===
California's 51st State Assembly district election, 2016
Primary election
Party	Candidate	Votes	%
Democratic	Jimmy Gomez (incumbent)	62,366	100.0
Libertarian	Mike Everling (write-in)	7	0.0
Total votes		62,373	100.0
General election
Democratic	Jimmy Gomez (incumbent)	110,036	86.1
Libertarian	Mike Everling	17,724	13.9
Total votes		127,760	100.0
Democratic hold			

=== District 52 ===
California's 52nd State Assembly district election, 2016
Primary election
Party	Candidate	Votes	%
Democratic	Freddie Rodriguez (incumbent)	33,830	63.9
Democratic	Paul Vincent Avila	18,943	35.8
Republican	Toni Holle (write-in)	196	0.4
Total votes		52,969	100.0
General election
Democratic	Freddie Rodriguez (incumbent)	64,836	59.1
Democratic	Paul Vincent Avila	44,865	40.9
Total votes		109,701	100.0
Democratic hold			

=== District 53 ===
California's 53rd State Assembly district election, 2016
Primary election
Party	Candidate	Votes	%
Democratic	Miguel Santiago (incumbent)	22,254	45.1
Democratic	Sandra Mendoza	20,388	41.3
Democratic	Kevin H. Jang	6,688	13.6
Total votes		49,330	100.0
General election
Democratic	Miguel Santiago (incumbent)	50,958	58.2
Democratic	Sandra Mendoza	36,583	41.8
Total votes		87,541	100.0
Democratic hold			

=== District 54 ===
California's 54th State Assembly district election, 2016
Primary election
Party	Candidate	Votes	%
Democratic	Sebastian Ridley-Thomas (incumbent)	83,889	83.2
Republican	Glen Ratcliff	16,880	16.8
Total votes		100,769	100.0
General election
Democratic	Sebastian Ridley-Thomas (incumbent)	146,723	81.6
Republican	Glen Ratcliff	33,119	18.4
Total votes		179,842	100.0
Democratic hold			

=== District 55 ===
California's 55th State Assembly district election, 2016
Primary election
Party	Candidate	Votes	%
Democratic	Gregg D. Fritchle	32,439	35.9
Republican	Phillip Chen	19,684	21.8
Republican	Mike Spence	18,737	20.7
Republican	Ray Marquez	10,881	12.0
Republican	Steven M. Tye	8,600	9.5
Total votes		90,341	100.0
General election
Republican	Phillip Chen	98,960	57.7
Democratic	Gregg D. Fritchle	72,471	42.3
Total votes		171,431	100.0
Republican hold			

=== District 56 ===
California's 56th State Assembly district election, 2016
Primary election
Party	Candidate	Votes	%
Democratic	Eduardo Garcia (incumbent)	45,122	100.0
Total votes		45,122	100.0
General election
Democratic	Eduardo Garcia (incumbent)	93,090	100.0
Total votes		93,090	100.0
Democratic hold			

=== District 57 ===
California's 57th State Assembly district election, 2016
Primary election
Party	Candidate	Votes	%
Democratic	Ian Calderon (incumbent)	50,996	65.7
Republican	Rita Topalian	26,639	34.3
Total votes		77,635	100.0
General election
Democratic	Ian Calderon (incumbent)	93,339	62.7
Republican	Rita Topalian	55,577	37.3
Total votes		148,916	100.0
Democratic hold			

=== District 58 ===
California's 58th State Assembly district election, 2016
Primary election
Party	Candidate	Votes	%
Democratic	Cristina Garcia (incumbent)	56,052	100.0
Republican	Ramiro Alvarado (write-in)	19	0.0
Total votes		56,071	100.0
General election
Democratic	Cristina Garcia (incumbent)	105,170	75.3
Republican	Ramiro Alvarado	34,449	24.7
Total votes		139,619	100.0
Democratic hold			

=== District 59 ===
California's 59th State Assembly district election, 2016
Primary election
Party	Candidate	Votes	%
Democratic	Reggie Jones-Sawyer (incumbent)	35,820	100.0
Total votes		35,820	100.0
General election
Democratic	Reggie Jones-Sawyer (incumbent)	77,324	100.0
Total votes		77,324	100.0
Democratic hold			

=== District 60 ===
California's 60th State Assembly district election, 2016
Primary election
Party	Candidate	Votes	%
Republican	Eric Linder (incumbent)	30,048	45.6
Democratic	Sabrina Cervantes	27,346	41.5
Democratic	Ken Park	8,478	12.9
Total votes		65,872	100.0
General election
Democratic	Sabrina Cervantes	77,404	54.5
Republican	Eric Linder (incumbent)	64,710	45.5
Total votes		142,114	100.0
Democratic gain from Republican			

=== District 61 ===
California's 61st State Assembly district election, 2016
Primary election
Party	Candidate	Votes	%
Democratic	Jose Medina (incumbent)	45,888	67.3
Republican	Hector Diaz	22,281	32.7
Total votes		68,169	100.0
General election
Democratic	Jose Medina (incumbent)	90,663	65.9
Republican	Hector Diaz	46,924	34.1
Total votes		137,587	100.0
Democratic hold			

=== District 62 ===
California's 62nd State Assembly district election, 2016
Primary election
Party	Candidate	Votes	%
Democratic	Autumn Burke (incumbent)	67,691	99.9
Libertarian	Baron Bruno (write-in)	32	0.0
Republican	Marco Antonio "Tony" Leal (write-in)	32	0.0
Total votes		67,755	100.0
General election
Democratic	Autumn Burke (incumbent)	123,699	77.2
Republican	Marco Antonio "Tony" Leal	27,628	17.2
Libertarian	Baron Bruno	8,958	5.6
Total votes		160,285	100.0
Democratic hold			

=== District 63 ===
California's 63rd State Assembly district election, 2016
Primary election
Party	Candidate	Votes	%
Democratic	Anthony Rendon (incumbent)	45,391	78.5
Republican	Adam Joshua Miller	12,419	21.5
Total votes		57,810	100.0
General election
Democratic	Anthony Rendon (incumbent)	89,134	77.6
Republican	Adam Joshua Miller	25,680	22.4
Total votes		114,814	100.0
Democratic hold			

=== District 64 ===
California's 64th State Assembly district election, 2016
Primary election
Party	Candidate	Votes	%
Democratic	Mike Gipson (incumbent)	46,186	76.5
Republican	Theresa Sanford	14,179	23.5
Total votes		60,365	100.0
General election
Democratic	Mike Gipson (incumbent)	86,419	73.4
Republican	Theresa Sanford	31,300	26.6
Total votes		117,719	100.0
Democratic hold			

=== District 65 ===
California's 65th State Assembly district election, 2016
Primary election
Party	Candidate	Votes	%
Democratic	Sharon Quirk-Silva	42,890	54.3
Republican	Young Kim (incumbent)	36,028	45.7
Total votes		78,918	100.0
General election
Democratic	Sharon Quirk-Silva	79,654	53.2
Republican	Young Kim (incumbent)	69,941	46.8
Total votes		149,595	100.0
Democratic gain from Republican			

=== District 66 ===
California's 66th State Assembly district election, 2016
Primary election
Party	Candidate	Votes	%
Democratic	Al Muratsuchi	53,295	48.7
Republican	David Hadley (incumbent)	48,755	44.6
Democratic	Mike Madrigal	7,307	6.7
Total votes		109,357	100.0
General election
Democratic	Al Muratsuchi	105,336	54.1
Republican	David Hadley (incumbent)	89,308	45.9
Total votes		194,644	100.0
Democratic gain from Republican			

=== District 67 ===
California's 67th State Assembly district election, 2016
Primary election
Party	Candidate	Votes	%
Republican	Melissa Melendez (incumbent)	51,987	63.5
Democratic	Jorge Lopez	29,924	36.5
Total votes		81,911	100.0
General election
Republican	Melissa Melendez (incumbent)	107,654	63.8
Democratic	Jorge Lopez	60,996	36.2
Total votes		168,650	100.0
Republican hold			

=== District 68 ===
California's 68th State Assembly district election, 2016
Primary election
Party	Candidate	Votes	%
Democratic	Sean Jay Panahi	32,610	33.0
Republican	Steven Choi	19,559	19.8
Republican	Harry Sidhu	19,405	19.7
Republican	Deborah Pauly	13,880	14.1
Republican	Alexia Deligianni-Brydges	5,098	5.2
No party preference	Brian Chuchua	4,635	4.7
Republican	Kostas Roditis	3,528	3.6
Total votes		98,715	100.0
General election
Republican	Steven Choi	114,210	60.3
Democratic	Sean Jay Panahi	75,231	39.7
Total votes		189,441	100.0
Republican hold			

=== District 69 ===
California's 69th State Assembly district election, 2016
Primary election
Party	Candidate	Votes	%
Democratic	Tom Daly (incumbent)	38,139	70.3
Republican	Ofelia Velarde-Garcia	16,125	29.7
Total votes		54,264	100.0
General election
Democratic	Tom Daly (incumbent)	69,640	68.3
Republican	Ofelia Velarde-Garcia	32,324	31.7
Total votes		101,964	100.0
Democratic hold			

=== District 70 ===
California's 70th State Assembly district election, 2016
Primary election
Party	Candidate	Votes	%
Democratic	Patrick O'Donnell (incumbent)	69,816	99.5
Republican	Martha E. Flores-Gibson (write-in)	328	0.5
Democratic	Billy Graham (write-in)	12	0.0
Total votes		70,156	100.0
General election
Democratic	Patrick O'Donnell (incumbent)	107,389	66.6
Republican	Martha E. Flores-Gibson	53,805	33.4
Total votes		161,194	100.0
Democratic hold			

=== District 71 ===
California's 71st State Assembly district election, 2016
Primary election
Party	Candidate	Votes	%
Republican	Randy Voepel	51,857	59.9
Republican	Leo Hamel	23,990	27.7
Republican	Tony Teora	10,770	12.4
Total votes		86,617	100.0
General election
Republican	Randy Voepel	108,049	65.8
Republican	Leo Hamel	56,184	34.2
Total votes		164,233	100.0
Republican hold			

=== District 72 ===
California's 72nd State Assembly district election, 2016
Primary election
Party	Candidate	Votes	%
Republican	Travis Allen (incumbent)	48,321	50.4
Democratic	Lenore Albert-Sheridan	27,466	28.6
Democratic	Nam Pham	20,158	21.0
Total votes		95,945	100.0
General election
Republican	Travis Allen (incumbent)	98,335	58.0
Democratic	Lenore Albert-Sheridan	71,332	42.0
Total votes		169,667	100.0
Republican hold			

=== District 73 ===
California's 73rd State Assembly district election, 2016
Primary election
Party	Candidate	Votes	%
Republican	Bill Brough (incumbent)	74,568	99.6
Democratic	Mesbah Islam (write-in)	278	0.4
Total votes		74,846	100.0
General election
Republican	Bill Brough (incumbent)	144,653	68.8
Democratic	Mesbah Islam	65,662	31.2
Total votes		210,315	100.0
Republican hold			

=== District 74 ===
California's 74th State Assembly district election, 2016
Primary election
Party	Candidate	Votes	%
Democratic	Karina Onofre	46,077	42.4
Republican	Matthew Harper (incumbent)	42,317	38.9
Republican	Katherine Daigle	20,258	18.6
Total votes		108,652	100.0
General election
Republican	Matthew Harper (incumbent)	114,477	56.2
Democratic	Karina Onofre	89,362	43.8
Total votes		203,839	100.0
Republican hold			

=== District 75 ===
California's 75th State Assembly district election, 2016
Primary election
Party	Candidate	Votes	%
Republican	Marie Waldron (incumbent)	56,407	60.3
Democratic	Andrew Masiel Sr.	37,104	39.7
Total votes		93,511	100.0
General election
Republican	Marie Waldron (incumbent)	111,598	62.9
Democratic	Andrew Masiel Sr.	65,770	37.1
Total votes		177,368	100.0
Republican hold			

=== District 76 ===
California's 76th State Assembly district election, 2016
Primary election
Party	Candidate	Votes	%
Republican	Rocky Chávez (incumbent)	68,819	99.5
Republican	Thomas E. Krouse (write-in)	376	0.5
Total votes		69,195	100.0
General election
Republican	Rocky Chávez (incumbent)	95,477	59.4
Republican	Thomas E. Krouse	65,377	40.6
Total votes		160,854	100.0
Republican hold			

=== District 77 ===
California's 77th State Assembly district election, 2016
Primary election
Party	Candidate	Votes	%
Republican	Brian Maienschein (incumbent)	68,812	57.7
Democratic	Melinda K. Vásquez	50,345	42.3
Total votes		119,157	100.0
General election
Republican	Brian Maienschein (incumbent)	121,140	57.8
Democratic	Melinda K. Vásquez	88,344	42.2
Total votes		181,556	100.0
Republican hold			

=== District 78 ===
California's 78th State Assembly district election, 2016
Primary election
Party	Candidate	Votes	%
Democratic	Todd Gloria	91,602	71.8
Republican	Kevin D. Melton	36,013	28.2
Total votes		127,615	100.0
General election
Democratic	Todd Gloria	145,850	69.1
Republican	Kevin D. Melton	65,134	30.9
Total votes		178,242	100.0
Democratic hold			

=== District 79 ===
California's 79th State Assembly district election, 2016
Primary election
Party	Candidate	Votes	%
Democratic	Shirley Weber (incumbent)	64,395	67.7
Republican	John Moore	30,711	32.3
Total votes		95,106	100.0
General election
Democratic	Shirley Weber (incumbent)	114,080	65.2
Republican	John Moore	60,827	34.8
Total votes		174,907	100.0
Democratic hold			

=== District 80 ===
California's 80th State Assembly district election, 2016
Primary election
Party	Candidate	Votes	%
Democratic	Lorena Gonzalez (incumbent)	55,150	74.6
Republican	Lincoln Pickard	14,015	19.0
No party preference	Louis J. Marinelli	4,753	6.4
Total votes		73,918	100.0
General election
Democratic	Lorena Gonzalez (incumbent)	108,655	77.8
Republican	Lincoln Pickard	30,917	22.2
Total votes		139,572	100.0
Democratic hold			

== See also ==
- 2016 United States elections
- 2016 United States Senate election in California
- 2016 United States House of Representatives elections in California
- 2016 California State Senate election
- 2016 California elections
