= Nelson Esparza =

American politician (born 1990/91)

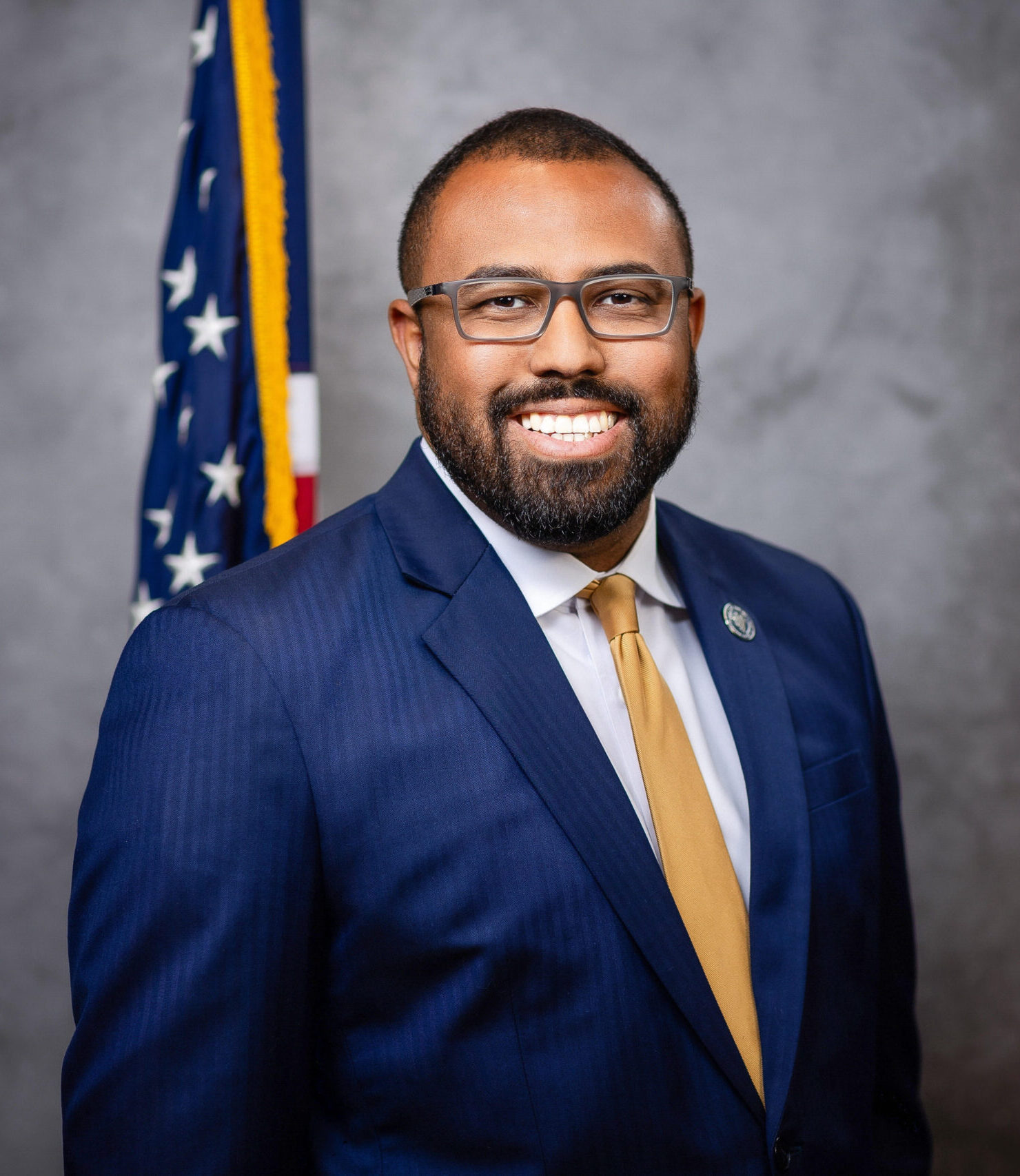
- Official portrait, 2026

Member-elect of the California State Board of Equalization from the 1st district
- Assuming office January 4, 2027
- Succeeding: Ted Gaines

President of the Fresno City Council
- Incumbent
- Assumed office March 2026
- Preceded by: Mike Karbassi
- In office January 2022 – January 2023
- Preceded by: Luis Chavez
- Succeeded by: Tyler Maxwell

Member of Fresno City Council from the 7th district
- Incumbent
- Assumed office January 2019
- Preceded by: Clint Olivier

Personal details
- Born: 1990 or 1991 (age 35–36)
- Party: Democratic
- Education: University of California, Riverside (BA); University of California, Los Angeles (MPP)

Nelson O. Esparza (born 1990 or 1991) is an American educator and politician serving as the president of the Fresno City Council since 2026. A member of the Democratic Party, he previously served in the same role in 2022 and has served as a member of the city council since 2019, representing the 7th district. He is a member-elect of the California State Board of Equalization for the 1st district following his victory in the 2026 election.

== Early life and education ==
Esparza was raised in a working-class Latino household in Madera, California, by his mother and stepfather, learning Spanish as his first language. His mother immigrated from Villanueva, Zacatecas, Mexico, while his biological father was African-American. Esparza has said he is usually perceived as Black, encountering racial profiling by the police from a young age. Since he did not grow up around his father, he was left to explore part of his identity "largely on [his] own". Esparza attended Martin Luther King Middle School and Madera High School, both in Madera, and competed in high school wrestling.

Esparza earned his bachelor's degree in economics from the University of California, Riverside, followed by his Master of Public Policy (MPP) from the Luskin School of Public Affairs at the University of California, Los Angeles. He was later named the 2019 MPP Alumnus of the Year.

== Career ==
Esparza was an economics instructor at Fresno City College. He also served on the Storyland and Playland Board and helped form neighborhood watch groups. In November 2016, Esparza was elected as a board trustee on the Fresno County Office of Education for Area 3 after defeating incumbent Barbara Thomas with 63.5 percent of the vote. The seat, which he later vacated for his city council run, was filled by Daren Miller in March 2019.

Esparza served as PAC Chair of the State Center Federation of Teachers, Local 1533, as well as political director of the Fresno County Young Democrats and a delegate to the California Democratic Party. He also owns a political consultant business, 1101 Strategies.

=== Fresno City Council ===
==== Elections ====
Esparza declared his candidacy for the Fresno City Council in April 2017, vying to fill the District 7 seat vacated by the termed-out Clint Olivier, and cited economic development as a motivating factor. He positioned himself as a moderate in comparison to his opponents, conservative Brian Whelan and liberal Veva Islas, and relied heavily on door-to-door campaigning. However, Esparza received some criticism for his hesitancy to support what he described as the "divisive rhetoric" of Black Lives Matter when asked his position at the BAPAC candidate forum in March 2018. Esparza finished second behind Whelan in the June primary by a margin of 11 votes, after which he was endorsed by The Fresno Bee editorial board. Both candidates sent out mailers depicting their opponent in a MAGA hat. "I think a line was crossed, said Esparza. "Being a Democrat, I have no affiliation with Donald Trump or his policies." Esparza defeated Whelan in the November runoff with 61.1 percent of the vote.

In 2022, Esparza was challenged by two grassroots candidates, student and youth ministry leader Courtney Westfall and retired paralegal Jason Jesada Keomanee. He raised over $300,000, much of which came from developers, business interests, and labor unions, and was once again endorsed by The Fresno Bee editorial board, who described him as being part of the council's progressive majority. Esparza was re-elected to his council seat after he won a majority in the June primary, garnering 66.1 percent of the vote.

==== Tenure ====
Esparza was sworn in at the Fresno City Council chambers on January 10, 2019.

In January 2021, Esparza was elected as the council vice president. He was then elected as the council president in January 2022, succeeding Luis Chavez.

In July 2022, Esparza was charged with attempted extortion for allegedly threatening to fire a former Fresno City Attorney unless he reserved his services for the council majority. Esparza had previously sued fellow councilmember Garry Bredefeld for defamation and libel over similar accusations in May, and denied all wrongdoing. The charge was reduced from a felony to a misdemeanor at a preliminary hearing in November, where he pled not guilty, while local Democrats speculated that District Attorney Lisa Smittcamp was using her office to prosecute potential political opposition. The case was dismissed the following month by the DA's office "in the interest of justice".

In January 2026, Esparza was elected as the council vice president. He took over as council president in March when the incumbent, Mike Karbassi, stepped down to run for the Fresno County Board of Supervisors.

Esparza served as chairman of the Finance and Audit Committee, the EIFD Public Financing Authority, and the School Liaison Subcommittee. He is also a member of the Fresno County Economic Development Corporation Board.

=== Other races ===
Esparza initially filed to run for the California State Board of Equalization in 2022.

In August 2024, Esparza announced his candidacy for California's 14th senatorial district, which was set to be vacated by the termed-out Anna Caballero. He received endorsements from U.S. Representatives Jim Costa and Adam Gray. However, Esparza suspended his campaign in August 2025 and endorsed his former council colleague, Esmeralda Soria. The following month, he filed to run for State Center Community College District trustee.

In January 2026, Esparza launched his campaign for the California State Board of Equalization 1st district seat, seeking to replace termed-out Republican Ted Gaines. He was endorsed by Costa, Gray, and Soria, as well as the California Labor Federation, the California Democratic Party, and the California Young Democrats.
