= Frank Murphy Jr. =

American politician in California (1934–2022)

Member of the California State Assembly from the 28th district
- In office December 2, 1974 – November 30, 1976
- Preceded by: Raymond Joseph Gonzales
- Succeeded by: Henry J. Mello

Member of the California State Assembly from the 31st district
- In office January 2, 1967 – November 30, 1974
- Preceded by: Gordon H. Winton
- Succeeded by: Ernest N. Mobley

Personal details
- Born: January 19, 1934 Santa Cruz, California, U.S.
- Died: December 15, 2022 (aged 88) Tucson, Arizona, U.S.
- Party: Republican
- Occupation: Lawyer

Military service
- Branch/service: United States Navy

John Francis Murphy Jr. (January 19, 1934 – December 15, 2022) was an American politician in the state of California. He served in the California State Assembly as a Republican for the 31st and 28th district from 1967 to 1976. Murphy died in Tucson, Arizona on December 15, 2022, at the age of 88.
