= Henry Perea =

American politician

Henry T. Perea
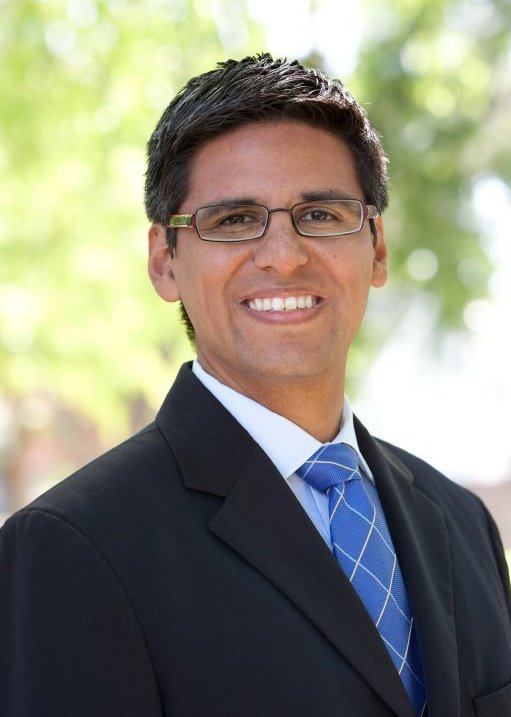
- Official portrait, c. 2010–2015

Member of the California State Assembly from the 31st district
- In office December 6, 2010 – December 31, 2015
- Preceded by: Juan Arambula
- Succeeded by: Joaquin Arambula

Member of the Fresno City Council
- In office December 2, 2002 – December 2, 2010
- Succeeded by: Clinton Olivier

Personal details
- Born: June 29, 1977 (age 49) Fresno, California
- Party: Democratic
- Spouse: Yahaira Garcia
- Children: 3
- Relatives: Annalisa Perea (sister)
- Education: California State University, Fresno

Henry T. Perea (born June 29, 1977) is an American politician and lobbyist. A member of the Democratic Party, he formerly represented the 31st district for the California State Assembly, encompassing western Fresno.

== Career ==
Perea has been described as a leader of the moderate, more business-friendly wing of the state legislature's Democrats. On December 1, 2015, he announced that he would resign his seat at the end of 2015, a year early, to seek a lucrative position as a lobbyist.

Prior to his election to the Assembly, Perea served on the Fresno City Council from 2003 to 2010. He was first elected to the council at the age of 25 and served as council president in 2007.

Perea also ran, unsuccessfully, in the 2008 Fresno mayoral election.

== Family ==
He is married to Yahaira Garcia-Perea and they have three children.

His father, Henry R. Perea, was a member of the Fresno County Board of Supervisors and the Fresno City Council.

== Electoral history ==
=== Fresno City Supervisor ===
2002 Fresno City Supervisor seat 7 election
Candidates	First round		Runoff	
	Votes	%	Votes	%
Henry T. Perea	2,712	46.36	3,769	50.26
Richard Caglia	2,391	40.87	3,713	49.51
Keith Chun	739	12.63		
Write-ins	8	0.14	17	0.23
Total	5,850	100	7,499	100

2004 Fresno City Supervisor seat 3 election
Candidates	First round		Runoff	
	Votes	%	Votes	%
Henry T. Perea	6,569	43.12	14,565	53.30
Sal Quintero	6,134	40.27	12,666	46.35
Debilyn Molineaux	1,732	11.37		
Jose Guadalupe Camac	760	4.99		
Write-ins	38	0.25	95	0.35
Total	15,233	100	27,326	100

2006 Fresno City Supervisor seat 7 election
Candidates	Votes	%
Henry T. Perea (incumbent)	3,729	97.80
Write-ins	84	2.20
Total	3,813	100

2008 Fresno City Supervisor seat 3 election
Candidates	Votes	%
Henry T. Perea	9,655	96.96

=== Fresno Mayor ===
2008 Fresno mayoral election
Candidates	First round		Runoff	
	Votes	%	Votes	%
Ashley Swearengin	15,410	27.11	72,784	54.35
Henry Perea	15,626	27.49	54.35	45.40
Jerry Duncan	6,495	11.43		
Jeff L. Eben	5,572	9.80		
Tom Boyajian	5,286	9.30		
Mike Dages	4,601	8.09		
Doug Vagim	1,226	2.16		
Barbara Ann Hunt	1,089	1.92		
Henry M. Montreal	682	1.20		
Jim Boswell	533	0.94		
Ignacio C. Garbibay	256	0.45		
Write-ins	—N/a	—N/a	336	0.25
Total	—N/a	—N/a	140,192	100

2016 Fresno mayoral election
Candidates	First round		Runoff	
	Votes	%	Votes	%
Lee Brand	25,491	30.79	71,776	51.20
Henry Perea	37,006	44.70	68,053	48.54
H. Spees	15,089	18.23		
Doug Vagim	2,910	3.52		
Richard B. Renteria	2,090	2.52		
Write-ins	199	0.24	363	0.26
Total	69,795	100	140,192	100

=== California State Assembly ===
2010 California State Assembly 31st district election
Primary election
Party	Candidate	Votes	%
Democratic	Henry Perea	14,071	75.5
Democratic	Rosaline Velasco	2,597	14.0
Democratic	Romelia Nino Castillo	1,973	10.5
General election
Democratic	Henry Perea	40,947	59.8
Republican	Brandon Shoemaker	27,606	40.2
Total votes		68,553	100.0
Democratic gain from Independent			

2012 California State Assembly 31st district election
Primary election
Party	Candidate	Votes	%
Democratic	Henry Perea (incumbent)	22,255	98.7
Republican	James (JD) Bennett (write-in)	299	1.3
Total votes		22,554	100.0
General election
Democratic	Henry Perea (incumbent)	55,626	64.0
Republican	James (JD) Bennett	31,282	36.0
Total votes		86,908	100.0
Democratic hold			

2014 California State Assembly 31st district election
Primary election
Party	Candidate	Votes	%
Democratic	Henry Perea (incumbent)	24,853	99.9
No party preference	Walter O. Villarreal (write-in)	24	0.1
Total votes		24,877	100.0
General election
Democratic	Henry Perea (incumbent)	36,165	66.7
No party preference	Walter O. Villarreal	18,017	33.3
Total votes		54,182	100.0
Democratic hold			
