= Gordon H. Winton =

American politician

Member of the California State Assembly from the 31st district
- In office January 7, 1957 - January 2, 1967
- Preceded by: George A. Clarke
- Succeeded by: Frank Murphy Jr.

Personal details
- Born: August 21, 1913 Merced, California
- Died: March 3, 1997 (aged 83) Merced, California
- Party: Democratic
- Spouse: Agnes Mattson (m. 1938)
- Children: 2

Military service
- Branch/service: United States Navy
- Battles/wars: World War II

Gordon Harvey Winton Jr. (August 21, 1913 – March 3, 1997) served in the California State Assembly for the 31st district from 1957 to 1967. During World War II he served in the United States Navy.
