= Henry J. Mello =

American businessman and politician from California

Member of the California Senate from the 15th district
- In office December 7, 1992 - November 30, 1996
- Preceded by: Rose Ann Vuich
- Succeeded by: Bruce McPherson

Member of the California Senate from the 17th district
- In office December 1, 1980 - November 30, 1992
- Preceded by: Bob Nimmo
- Succeeded by: Don Rogers

Member of the California State Assembly from the 28th district
- In office December 6, 1976 - November 30, 1980
- Preceded by: Frank Murphy, Jr.
- Succeeded by: Sam Farr

Personal details
- Born: March 27, 1924 Watsonville, California, US
- Died: September 4, 2004 (aged 80) Watsonville, California, US
- Party: Democratic
- Spouse: Helen Mello
- Children: 4
- Occupation: Politician, businessman in farming
- Known for: Mello-Roos

Henry John Mello (March 27, 1924 – September 4, 2004) was an American politician from California. Mello was a member of the California State Senate known for the Community Facilities District Act, otherwise known as the Mello-Roos Act.

== Early life ==
Mello was born in Watsonville, California, on March 27, 1924. His father was a Portuguese immigrant. Mello attended Watsonville High School and Hartnell College in Salinas, California.

== Career ==
In 1940, Mello and his father started a farming business. Mello founded Mello Packing Company in 1948.

In 1966, Mello was elected to the Santa Cruz County Board of Supervisors.

Mello was elected to the California State Assembly from District 28 in 1976, and was re-elected in 1978. He was elected to the California State Senate from District 17 in 1980. Re-elected from that district in 1984 and 1988, he won one last term from the renumbered District 15 in 1992. Term limits enacted in 1990 forced Mello's retirement from the Senate in 1996.

== Personal life ==
Mello's wife was Helen Annette (Burns) Mello. They had four sons, John Henry Mello, Stephen F. Mello, Michael Burns Mello and Timothy S. Mello.

On September 4, 2004, Mello died in Watsonville, California at the age of 80.

== Legacy ==
- Senator Henry J. Mello Highway.
- 1990 Henry J. Mello Foundation.
- Henry J. Mello Center, a concert performance hall in Watsonville, California.

== See also ==
- Mello-Roos (with Mike Roos)
