= Cong Thanh Do =

Vietnamese activist

Cong Thanh Do (Vietnamese: Đỗ Thành Công) (born ca. 1959) is a Vietnamese American human rights activist.

== Arrest ==
Do was forced to leave his country of South Vietnam due to political changes when the communist North Vietnamese Army defeated the Army of the Republic of Vietnam, after the Fall of Saigon and the nation was ruled under a communist dictatorship. Do emigrated from Vietnam to the US in 1982. He advocates a multi-party democratic system for Vietnam, and has been accused of plotting to overthrow the Vietnamese government. He moved to San Jose, California and worked as an engineer.

In August 2006, he was arrested while on holiday in Phan Thiết and held in jail in Ho Chi Minh City without trial. The government claimed that he and two others were printing anti-communist propaganda and distributing it as well as crafting a terrorist plot against the Embassy of the United States, Saigon. His wife was brought in for questioning about his affiliation with the Government of Free Vietnam.

While imprisoned he began a 38-day hunger strike, drinking only water and, occasionally, milk. His imprisonment was protested by a petition to the US Congress calling for the blocking of economic trade agreement, Permanent Normal Trade Relations between the US and the Socialist Republic of Viet Nam. Under international pressure, the government released Do from jail and deported him back to the United States on 21 September 2006.

He is a democracy activist for political change in Vietnam and his written various political topics calling for democratic elections in Vietnam and posting them on the internet in the United States.

== Life after Release ==
He is an advocate of free elections in Vietnam under the pen name "Nam Tran" with which he posts his political papers on the internet and various Vietnamese language newspapers in the United States and overseas.

The Government of Free Vietnam has issued a statement of non-affiliation with Mr. Do, in response to the investigation by the Vietnamese government. Do is a founding and senior member of the Democratic Party of Vietnam

In 2016, Do unsuccessfully ran for California State Assembly District 27.

== Remarks in Protest of Arrest in Vietnam ==
- "The Vietnamese government has now taken the unprecedented step of imprisoning a United States citizen who states that he is being held solely because of his pro-democratic, non-violent views," said US Congresswoman Zoe Lofgren
- "Urging Congress not to grant Vietnam permanent normal trading relations until Do is freed. That economic status is a necessary step in Vietnam's bid to join the World Trade Organization. Vietnam's entry into the WTO is expected before the end of the year." Van Tran, a prominent Vietnamese-American state assemblyman from Southern California.
