= Charles B. Garrigus =

American politician (1914–2000)

Member of the California State Assembly from the 33rd district
- In office January 5, 1959 - January 2, 1967
- Preceded by: William W. Hansen
- Succeeded by: Ernest N. Mobley

Personal details
- Born: June 13, 1914 Benton, Illinois
- Died: October 4, 2000 (aged 86) Kingsburg, California
- Party: Republican
- Spouse: Ferne Marie Fetters (m. 1936, d. 1982)
- Children: 5

Charles B. Garrigus (June 13, 1914 Benton, Illinois – October 4, 2000) was an American poet and professor who was California Poet Laureate from 1966 to 2000. He also served in the California State Assembly for 33rd district from 1959 to 1967.

He lived in Reedley, California and was professor of English at Reedley College.
