= Juan Arambula =

American politician

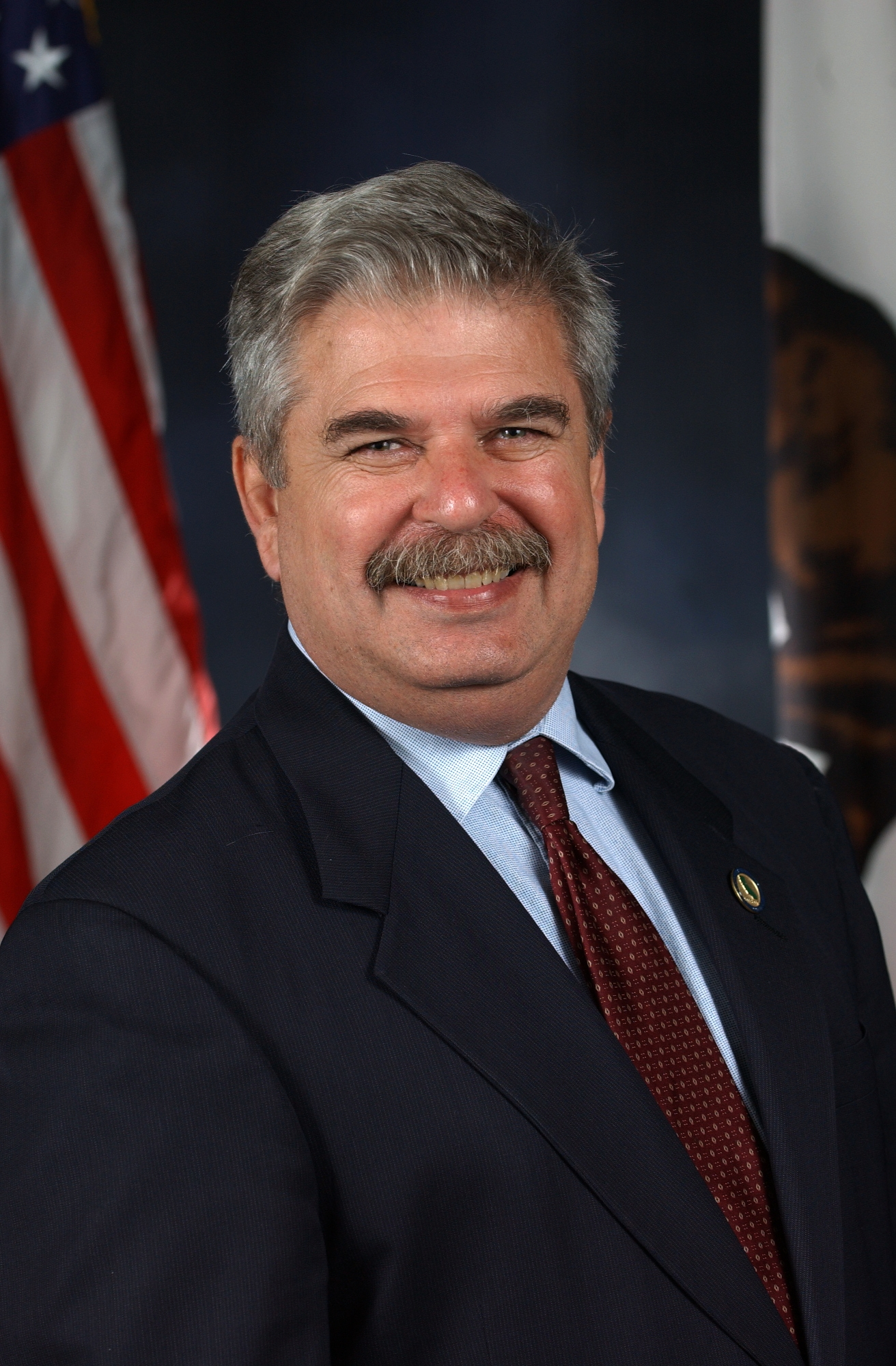

Member of the California State Assembly from the 31st district
- In office December 6, 2004 – November 30, 2010
- Preceded by: Sarah Reyes
- Succeeded by: Henry Perea

Personal details
- Born: January 29, 1952 (age 74) Brownsville, Texas, U.S.
- Party: Independent (2009–present); Democrat (until 2009)
- Spouse: Amy Rappaport
- Children: 4, including Joaquin
- Education: Harvard University; Stanford University; University of California, Berkeley
- Occupation: Public Service
- Profession: Politician

Juan Arambula (born January 29, 1952) is an American politician. He formerly represented the 31st district. Arambula was elected to the assembly in 2004. While Arambula had announced that he would retire in 2008, he ran again that year and won his final term. He was a Democrat until June 2009, when he became an independent. He was term limited in 2010.

== Education and background ==
He graduated with high honors from Harvard University, and went on to earn a Master's degree in Educational Administration and Policy Analysis from the Stanford Graduate School of Education and a Juris Doctor (J.D.) from the University of California, Berkeley.

Arambula is the son of immigrant farm workers. In his youth, he harvested crops with his family throughout California. He lives in Fresno with Amy, his wife of 30 years. He has four adult children: Joaquin, Carmen, Diego and Miguel. His religion is "decline to state."

== Pre-Assembly career ==
Prior to his election to the assembly, Arambula served on the Fresno County Board of Supervisors from 1997 to 2004. He earned the Rose Ann Vuich Award for Ethics in Leadership in 2002 for his public service.

Early in his career, Assembly Member Arambula served as an attorney for the Agricultural Labor Relations Board. He also performed legal services for California Rural Legal Assistance (CRLA) in its Delano office.

From 1987 to 1996, Arambula served on the Fresno Unified School District Board, where he worked to meet the needs of a diverse student population while maintaining financial stability during lean budget years. Arambula also served on the Board of Directors for the California School Boards Association and the California State Association of Counties.

== Priorities ==
Juan Arambula has stated that his top legislative priorities include efforts to improve California's business climate, to encourage job creation and retention, as well as efforts to improve the health care system, student academic achievement and school accountability. He is also working to tackle air pollution in the Central Valley, the shortage of health care professionals, and California's infrastructure challenges.

== Recognition ==
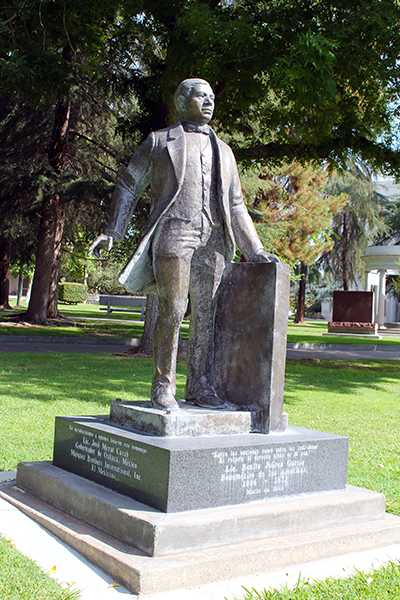
Statue of Benito Juárez in Courthouse Park, erected through Arambula's efforts in 2003.

Juan Arambula was named "Legislator of the Year" by the California Small Business Association.

== Retribution for party change ==
Democratic Speaker Karen Bass stripped Arambula of his chairmanship of the Public Safety Committee in retribution for Arambula leaving the Democratic Party to become an independent.
