= Joaquin Arambula =

American politician

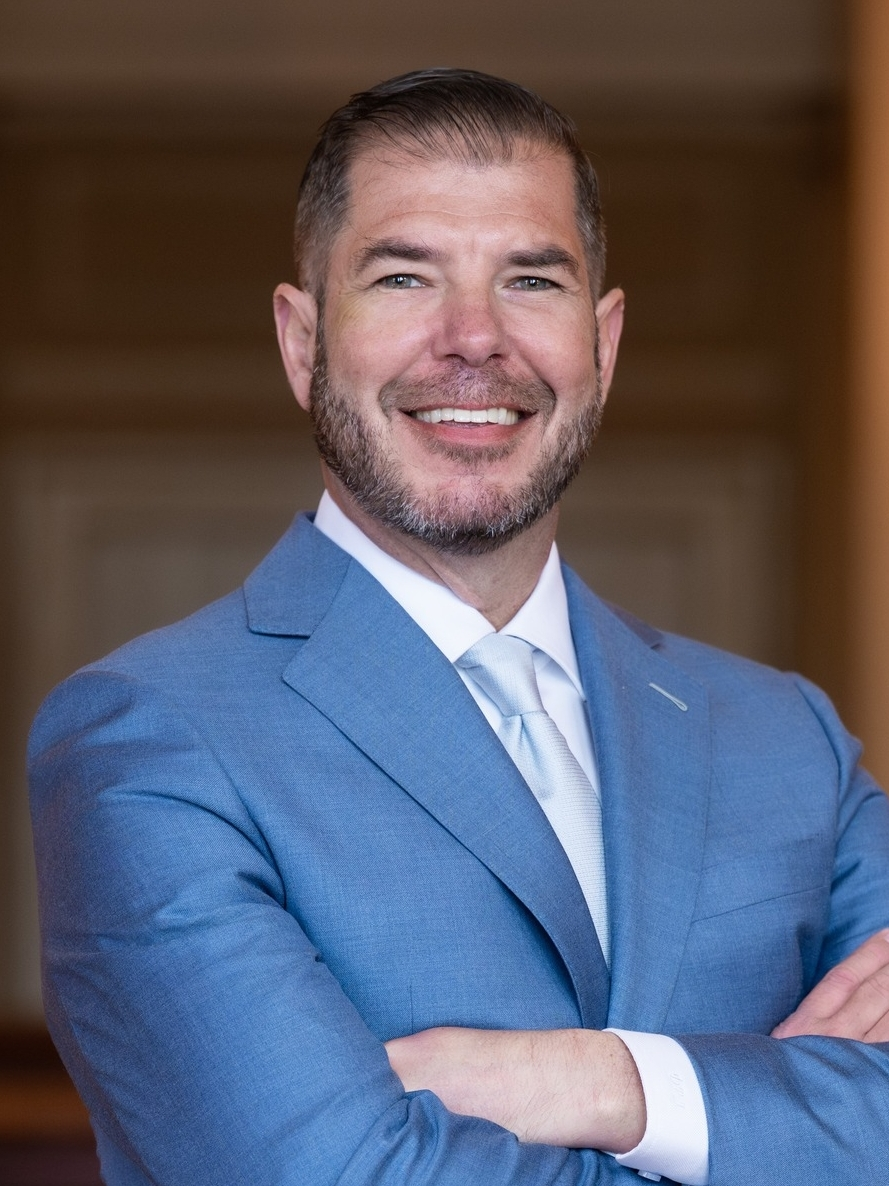
- Official portrait, 2025

Member of the California State Assembly from the 31st district
- Incumbent
- Assumed office April 14, 2016
- Preceded by: Henry Perea

Personal details
- Born: May 17, 1977 (age 49) Delano, California, U.S.
- Party: Democratic
- Other political affiliations: Independent (2014–2015)
- Spouse: Elizabeth Arambula (m. 2011; div. 2026)
- Children: 3
- Relatives: Juan Arambula (father); Jerome Lyle Rappaport (grandfather); Nancy Rappaport (aunt); Jim Rappaport (uncle)
- Education: Bowdoin College (BS); University of Minnesota Medical School MD)

Joaquin Arambula (born May 17, 1977) is an American politician and emergency department physician serving in the California State Assembly. A member of the California Latino Legislative Caucus and the California Legislative Progressive Caucus, he was elected in a 2016 special election to represent the same district previously held by his father, Juan Arambula. The special election was held following the resignation of Henry Perea, who resigned from the Assembly to work as a lobbyist for the Pharmaceutical Research and Manufacturers of America. He is currently running for Fresno City Council in 2026.

== Early life and career ==
Joaquin Arambula was born on May 17, 1977 in Delano, California to Juan Arambula and Amy Rappaport. His father, Juan Arambula, pursued a career in politics, serving on the Fresno Unified School District Board, the Fresno County Board of Supervisors, and in the California State Assembly from 1987 to 2010. His mother, Amy, is the daughter of lawyer Jerome Lyle Rappaport and the sister of Republican politician Jim Rappaport and adolescent psychiatrist Nancy Rappaport. His brother, Diego, multiple positions in schools in Fresno before being appointed to the California State University Board of Trustees in 2020. Arambula moved to Fresno for his education, attending Computech Middle School and Edison High School. He later studied at Bowdoin College in Brunswick, Maine and the University of Minnesota Medical School. For 20 years, he practiced medicine in the Central Valley, where he said he saw patients who could not afford prescriptions, inspiring him to run for office.

== Political career ==
In May 2015, Arambula announced his candidacy for the California State Assembly, aiming to succeed term-limited Democrat Henry Perea. He cited his experience as an emergency room doctor, saying he had seen too many people without access to primary care and was also concerned about public education. His father, Juan, advised him against running and encouraged him to remain in medicine. Perea resigned on December 31, 2015 to become a lobbyist, and a special election was held, which Arambula won.

He was re-elected in 2018, 2020, 2022, and 2024 by large margins against Republican opponents, never receiving less than 60% of the vote. During his tenure in the California State Assembly, Arambula played a key role in efforts to expand Medi-Cal access to all residents regardless of immigration status. His legislative priorities centered on improving health care access and affordability, protecting safety net programs for working families, addressing the shortage of doctors and medical providers, and expanding workforce development programs.

In 2026, he announced his retirement from the State Assembly and said he would run for the Fresno City Council. During the primary, Solomon Verduzco, Arambula’s opponent in 2024, launched the website Joaquin Needs a Job, which attacked Arambula on his record. He finished first with about 30% of the vote and went into a runoff against Fresno Unified Trustee Keshia Thomas.

== Personal life ==
Arambula married his wife, Elizabeth, on January 22, 2011, having three girls with her.

Arambula was arrested on December 10, 2018, on suspicion of willful cruelty to a child, a misdemeanor under California domestic violence statutes. The assemblymember thanked the teachers at his daughter's school and police officers “for doing their job” in starting the investigation. One of his daughters had alleged that her father hit her on the face while he was wearing a ring. During trial, photos were shown to jurors that showed a 1-inch bruise on the child's right temple. On the witness stand during his trial, his daughter largely described the incident as an accident. In May 2019, a Fresno jury found Arambula not guilty.

On January 7, 2026, Aarambula entered a voluntary inpatient rehabilitation program, and on January 26 his wife Elizabeth filed for divorce, accusing him of past substance abuse and gaming addiction. He completed the program on February 6, saying in his declaration that he “needed some help to adjust and to make sure that [he] did not become dependent on alcohol or marijuana,” and that he had no criminal or psychiatric history. By April, they told reporters that they had met and reached a temporary agreement while continuing their divorce, with him being allowed to see their children and Elizabeth providing financial support.

== Electoral history ==
2016 California State Assembly 31st district special election Vacancy resulting from the resignation of Henry Perea
Primary election
Party	Candidate	Votes	%
Democratic	Joaquin Arambula	19,621	53.8
Republican	Clint Olivier	14,708	40.3
Democratic	Ted Miller	2,152	5.9
Total votes		36,481	100.0
Democratic hold			

2016 California State Assembly 31st district election
Primary election
Party	Candidate	Votes	%
Democratic	Joaquin Arambula (incumbent)	31,600	57.7
Republican	Clint Olivier	19,605	35.8
Democratic	Ted Miller	3,582	6.5
Total votes		54,787	100.0
General election
Democratic	Joaquin Arambula (incumbent)	62,404	63.8
Republican	Clint Olivier	35,454	36.2
Total votes		97,858	100.0
Democratic hold			

2018 California State Assembly 31st district election
Primary election
Party	Candidate	Votes	%
Democratic	Joaquin Arambula (incumbent)	24,128	59.5
Republican	Lupe Espinoza	16,431	40.5
Total votes		40,559	100.0
General election
Democratic	Joaquin Arambula (incumbent)	54,921	64.8
Republican	Lupe Espinoza	29,771	35.2
Total votes		84,692	100.0
Democratic hold			

2020 California State Assembly 31st district election
Primary election
Party	Candidate	Votes	%
Democratic	Joaquin Arambula (incumbent)	38,317	61.7
Republican	Fernando Banuelos	23,743	38.3
Total votes		62,060	100.0
General election
Democratic	Joaquin Arambula (incumbent)	77,193	61.9
Republican	Fernando Banuelos	47,551	38.1
Total votes		124,744	100.0
Democratic hold			

2022 California State Assembly 31st district election
Primary election
Party	Candidate	Votes	%
Democratic	Joaquin Arambula (incumbent)	23,629	55.5
Republican	Dolce Misol Calandra	13,858	32.6
Democratic	John Mendoza	3,242	7.6
No party preference	Andrew Verhines	1,842	4.3
Total votes		42,571	100.0
General election
Democratic	Joaquin Arambula (incumbent)	44,255	60.8
Republican	Dolce Misol Calandra	28,557	39.2
Total votes		72,812	100.0
Democratic hold			

2024 California State Assembly 31st district election
Primary election
Party	Candidate	Votes	%
Democratic	Joaquin Arambula (incumbent)	28,819	60.0
Republican	Solomon Verduzco	19,240	40.0
Total votes		48,059	100.0
General election
Democratic	Joaquin Arambula (incumbent)	69,767	60.2
Republican	Solomon Verduzco	46,120	39.8
Total votes		115,887	100.0
Democratic hold			
