= Clint Olivier =

American politician

Clinton J. Olivier
- Olivier in 2011

Member of the Fresno City Council from the 7th district
- In office December 2, 2010 – 2018
- Mayor: Ashley Swearengin
- Preceded by: Henry T. Perea
- Succeeded by: Nelson Esparza

Fresno City Council President
- In office January 5, 2012 – January 10, 2013
- Preceded by: Lee Brand
- Succeeded by: Blong Xiong

Personal details
- Born: April 30, 1975 (age 51) Los Alamitos, California, U.S.
- Spouse: Alisha Gallon
- Children: Conrad, Carsten
- Website: District 7 Website

Clinton J. Olivier is an American politician who served as the City Council representative for the City of Fresno's Seventh council district. Olivier was elected to the City Council in June 2010 with 62% of the vote. Olivier was sworn into office on December 2, 2010. In 2016 he unsuccessfully ran for the California State Assembly in the 31st district, losing to Democrat Joaquin Arambula. In 2018, he was not eligible to run for reelection due to term limits.

He currently works for The Fresno Bee as a political contributor.

== Early life and education ==
Olivier was born in Los Alamitos, California.

He attended Orange Coast College in Costa Mesa, California and majored in Speech Communications at California State University, Long Beach. He served as an air support radioman in the Marine Corps Reserve.
