= Ernest N. Mobley =

American politician

Member of the California State Assembly from the 31st district
- In office December 2, 1974 - November 30, 1976
- Preceded by: Frank Murphy Jr.
- Succeeded by: Richard H. Lehman

Member of the California State Assembly from the 33rd district
- In office January 2, 1967 - November 30, 1974
- Preceded by: Charles B. Garrigus
- Succeeded by: Bill Thomas

Personal details
- Born: November 1, 1914 Shadyside, Ohio
- Died: March 10, 2009 (aged 94)
- Party: Republican
- Spouse: Lillian Van Zant
- Children: 1

Military service
- Branch/service: United States Army
- Battles/wars: World War II

Ernest Nelson Mobley (November 1, 1914 - March 10, 2009) served in the California State Assembly representing the 33rd District and 31st District from 1967 to 1976. During World War II he served in the United States Army.

Mobley graduated from Ohio University in 1943, where he was a member of Tau Kappa Epsilon fraternity.
