= California's 31st State Assembly district =

American legislative district

Current assemblymember
Joaquin Arambula; D–Fresno
- Population (2010) • Voting age • Citizen voting age: 468,265; 314,850; 211,837
- Demographics: 17.28% White; 4.77% Black; 68.14% Latino; 8.34% Asian; 0.76% Native American; 0.09% Hawaiian/Pacific Islander; 0.22% other; 0.38% remainder of multiracial
- Registered voters: 174,654
- Registration: 47.49% Democratic; 26.72% Republican; 21.34% No party preference

California's 31st State Assembly district is one of 80 California State Assembly districts. It is currently represented by Democrat Joaquin Arambula of Fresno.

== District profile ==
The district encompasses western Fresno County and is anchored by the city of Fresno. Located in the middle of the Central Valley, the district is heavily agricultural and Latino.

Fresno County – 50.3%

- Biola
- Bowles
- Calwa
- Cantua Creek
- Caruthers
- Coalinga
- Del Rey
- Easton
- Firebaugh
- Fowler
- Fresno – 41.0%
- Huron
- Kerman
- Kingsburg
- Mendota
- Monmouth
- Orange Cove
- Parlier
- Raisin City
- Reedley
- San Joaquin
- Sanger
- Selma
- Tranquillity

== Election results from statewide races ==
Year	Office	Results
2021	Recall	No 56.6 – 43.4%
2020	President	Biden 61.9 – 36.2%
2018	Governor	Newsom 58.3 – 41.7%
2018	Senator	de Leon 50.7 – 49.3%
2016	President	Clinton 62.1 – 32.9%
2016	Senator	Sanchez 55.9 – 44.1%
2014	Governor	Brown 58.2 – 41.8%
2012	President	Obama 62.0 – 36.2%
2012	Senator	Feinstein 62.6 – 37.4%

== List of assembly members representing the district ==
Due to redistricting, the 31st district has been moved around different parts of the state. The current iteration resulted from the 2021 redistricting by the California Citizens Redistricting Commission.

Assembly members	Party	Years served	Counties represented	Notes
Peter Deveny	Republican	January 5, 1885 – January 3, 1887	San Francisco	
Edwin Lewis	Democratic	January 3, 1887 – January 7, 1889	San Francisco	
Thomas J. Brannan	Democratic	January 7, 1889 – January 5, 1891	San Francisco	
John Hayes	Republican	January 5, 1891 – January 2, 1893	San Francisco	
John J. Kennedy	Democratic	January 2, 1893 – January 7, 1895	San Francisco	
J. J. Wilkinson	Republican	January 7, 1895 – January 4, 1897	San Francisco	
Timothy E. Treacy	Democratic	January 4, 1897 – January 2, 1899	San Francisco	
Daniel S. O'Brien	Democratic	January 2, 1899 – January 1, 1901	San Francisco	
John J. Hourigan	Republican	January 1, 1901 – January 5, 1903	San Francisco	
Charles A. Siskron	Democratic	January 5, 1903 – January 2, 1905	San Francisco	
Jeremiah Lucey	Republican	January 2, 1905 – January 7, 1907	San Francisco	
Daniel J. Toomey	Republican	January 7, 1907 – January 4, 1909	San Francisco	
James Edward Hopkins	Union Labor	January 4, 1909 – January 2, 1911	San Francisco	
Walter A. McDonald	Republican	January 2, 1911 – January 6, 1913	San Francisco	
Milton L. Schmitt	Republican	January 6, 1913 – January 8, 1917	San Francisco	
Milton Marks Sr.	Republican	January 8, 1917 – January 6, 1919	San Francisco	
Albert A. Rosenshine	Republican	January 6, 1919 – January 3, 1927	San Francisco	
B. J. Feigenbaum	Republican	January 3, 1927 – January 2, 1933	San Francisco	
C. C. Cottrell	Republican	January 2, 1933 – January 2, 1939	Santa Clara	
M. G. Del Mutolo	Democratic	January 2, 1939 – January 4, 1943	Santa Clara	
George A. Clarke	Republican	January 4, 1943 – January 7, 1957	Madera, Merced	
Gordon H. Winton	Democratic	January 7, 1957 – January 2, 1967	Madera, Merced	
Gordon H. Winton	Democratic	January 7, 1957 – January 2, 1967	Madera, Merced, San Benito	
Frank Murphy Jr.	Republican	January 2, 1967 – November 30, 1974	Merced, San Benito, Santa Cruz	
Ernest N. Mobley	Republican	December 2, 1974 – November 30, 1976	Fresno, Tulare	
Richard H. Lehman	Democratic	December 6, 1976 – November 30, 1982	Fresno, Tulare	
Bruce Bronzan	Democratic	December 6, 1982 – November 30, 1992	Fresno	Won re-election but declined to serve another term.
Vacant		November 30, 1992 – April 29, 1993	Fresno	
Cruz Bustamante	Democratic	April 29, 1993 – November 30, 1998	Fresno, Tulare	Sworn in after winning special election to fill in vacant seat left by his predecessor after he declined to serve another term.
Sarah Reyes	Democratic	December 7, 1998 – November 30, 2004	Fresno, Tulare	
Juan Arambula	Democratic	December 6, 2004 – November 30, 2010	Fresno, Tulare	On June 23, 2009, Juan Arambula changed his party affiliation to independent while in office.
Juan Arambula	Independent	December 6, 2004 – November 30, 2010	Fresno, Tulare	On June 23, 2009, Juan Arambula changed his party affiliation to independent while in office.
Henry Perea	Democratic	December 6, 2010 – December 31, 2015	Fresno, Tulare	Resigned from the California State Assembly to become a lobbyist.
Henry Perea	Democratic	December 6, 2010 – December 31, 2015	Fresno	Resigned from the California State Assembly to become a lobbyist.
Vacant		December 31, 2015 – April 14, 2016	Fresno	
Joaquin Arambula	Democratic	April 14, 2016 – present	Fresno	Sworn in after winning special election when his predecessor resigned to become a lobbyist.

== Election results (1990–present) ==
=== 2024 ===
2024 California State Assembly 31st district election
Primary election
Party	Candidate	Votes	%
Democratic	Joaquin Arambula (incumbent)	28,819	60.0
Republican	Solomon Verduzco	19,240	40.0
Total votes		48,059	100.0
General election
Democratic	Joaquin Arambula (incumbent)	69,767	60.2
Republican	Solomon Verduzco	46,120	39.8
Total votes		115,887	100.0
Democratic hold			

=== 2022 ===
2022 California State Assembly 31st district election
Primary election
Party	Candidate	Votes	%
Democratic	Joaquin Arambula (incumbent)	23,629	55.5
Republican	Dolce Misol Calandra	13,858	32.6
Democratic	John Mendoza	3,242	7.6
No party preference	Andrew Verhines	1,842	4.3
Total votes		42,571	100.0
General election
Democratic	Joaquin Arambula (incumbent)	44,255	60.8
Republican	Dolce Misol Calandra	28,557	39.2
Total votes		72,812	100.0
Democratic hold			

=== 2020 ===
2020 California State Assembly 31st district election
Primary election
Party	Candidate	Votes	%
Democratic	Joaquin Arambula (incumbent)	38,317	61.7
Republican	Fernando Banuelos	23,743	38.3
Total votes		62,060	100.0
General election
Democratic	Joaquin Arambula (incumbent)	77,193	61.9
Republican	Fernando Banuelos	47,551	38.1
Total votes		124,744	100.0
Democratic hold			

=== 2018 ===
2018 California State Assembly 31st district election
Primary election
Party	Candidate	Votes	%
Democratic	Joaquin Arambula (incumbent)	24,128	59.5
Republican	Lupe Espinoza	16,431	40.5
Total votes		40,559	100.0
General election
Democratic	Joaquin Arambula (incumbent)	54,921	64.8
Republican	Lupe Espinoza	29,771	35.2
Total votes		84,692	100.0
Democratic hold			

=== 2016 ===
2016 California State Assembly 31st district election
Primary election
Party	Candidate	Votes	%
Democratic	Joaquin Arambula (incumbent)	31,600	57.7
Republican	Clint Olivier	19,605	35.8
Democratic	Ted Miller	3,582	6.5
Total votes		54,787	100.0
General election
Democratic	Joaquin Arambula (incumbent)	62,404	63.8
Republican	Clint Olivier	35,454	36.2
Total votes		97,858	100.0
Democratic hold			

=== 2016 (special) ===
2016 California State Assembly 31st district special election Vacancy resulting from the resignation of Henry Perea
Primary election
Party	Candidate	Votes	%
Democratic	Joaquin Arambula	19,621	53.8
Republican	Clint Olivier	14,708	40.3
Democratic	Ted Miller	2,152	5.9
Total votes		36,481	100.0
Democratic hold			

=== 2014 ===
2014 California State Assembly 31st district election
Primary election
Party	Candidate	Votes	%
Democratic	Henry Perea (incumbent)	24,853	99.9
No party preference	Walter O. Villarreal (write-in)	24	0.1
Total votes		24,877	100.0
General election
Democratic	Henry Perea (incumbent)	36,165	66.7
No party preference	Walter O. Villarreal	18,017	33.3
Total votes		54,182	100.0
Democratic hold			

=== 2012 ===
2012 California State Assembly 31st district election
Primary election
Party	Candidate	Votes	%
Democratic	Henry Perea (incumbent)	22,255	98.7
Republican	James (JD) Bennett (write-in)	299	1.3
Total votes		22,554	100.0
General election
Democratic	Henry Perea (incumbent)	55,626	64.0
Republican	James (JD) Bennett	31,282	36.0
Total votes		86,908	100.0
Democratic hold			

=== 2010 ===
2010 California State Assembly 31st district election
Party	Candidate	Votes	%
Democratic	Henry Perea	40,947	59.8
Republican	Brandon Shoemaker	27,606	40.2
Total votes		68,553	100.0
Democratic gain from Independent			

=== 2008 ===
2008 California State Assembly 31st district election
Party	Candidate	Votes	%
Democratic	Juan Arambula (incumbent)	64,620	69.6
Republican	Clifford Archer	28,310	30.4
Democratic	Christopher Alexander McCowan (write-in)	17	0.0
Total votes		92,947	100.0
Democratic hold			

=== 2006 ===
2006 California State Assembly 31st district election
Party	Candidate	Votes	%
Democratic	Juan Arambula (incumbent)	45,004	100.0
Total votes		45,004	100.0
Democratic hold			

=== 2004 ===
2004 California State Assembly 31st district election
Party	Candidate	Votes	%
Democratic	Juan Arambula	49,738	57.7
Republican	Paul Betancourt	36,496	42.3
Total votes		86,234	100.0
Democratic hold			

=== 2002 ===
2002 California State Assembly 31st district election
Party	Candidate	Votes	%
Democratic	Sarah L. Reyes (incumbent)	41,050	100.0
Total votes		41,050	100.0
Democratic hold			

=== 2000 ===
2000 California State Assembly 31st district election
Party	Candidate	Votes	%
Democratic	Sarah L. Reyes (incumbent)	47,202	63.2
Republican	Richard Guerra Cabral	27,529	36.8
Total votes		74,731	100.0
Democratic hold			

=== 1998 ===
1998 California State Assembly 31st district election
Party	Candidate	Votes	%
Democratic	Sarah L. Reyes	36,553	59.0
Republican	David Jackson	25,426	41.0
Total votes		61,979	100.0
Democratic hold			

=== 1996 ===
1996 California State Assembly 31st district election
Party	Candidate	Votes	%
Democratic	Cruz Bustamante (incumbent)	43,735	62.5
Republican	Nathan Short	22,053	31.5
Libertarian	Joseph H. Peacock II	2,935	4.2
Natural Law	Joni Mamicki	1,273	1.8
Total votes		69,996	100.0
Democratic hold			

=== 1994 ===
1994 California State Assembly 31st district election
Party	Candidate	Votes	%
Democratic	Cruz Bustamante (incumbent)	37,012	58.4
Republican	Glen S. Peterson	26,378	41.6
Total votes		63,390	100.0
Democratic hold			

=== 1993 (special) ===
1993 California State Assembly 31st district special election Vacancy resulting from the resignation of Bruce Bronzan
Party	Candidate	Votes	%
Democratic	Cruz Bustamante	18,697	57.6
Republican	Doug Vagim	13,735	42.4
Total votes		32,432	100.0
Democratic hold			

=== 1992 ===
1992 California State Assembly 31st district election
Party	Candidate	Votes	%
Democratic	Bruce Bronzan (incumbent)	58,025	100.0
Total votes		58,025	100.0
Democratic hold			

=== 1990 ===
1990 California State Assembly 31st district election
Party	Candidate	Votes	%
Democratic	Bruce Bronzan (incumbent)	54,977	100.0
Total votes		54,977	100.0
Democratic hold			

== See also ==
- California State Assembly
- California State Assembly districts
- Districts in California
