= Fresno City Council =

Legislative body of Fresno, California

Fresno City Council is the legislative body of Fresno, California. Their powers and duties are subject to the Ralph M. Brown Act and include the consideration of land use decisions, approving the annual City budget, and other actions taken by ordinance, resolution, etc. at publicly noticed City Council Meetings.

== Elections ==
Councilmembers are elected to four year terms and there is a limit of two terms. However, the City Charter permits a termed out Councilmember to stand for election for the same district for additional nonconsecutive terms. The most recent occurrence was when Sal Quintero was elected to represent District 5 for a 3rd term in 2006. Councilmembers are elected in staggered terms. Odd numbered Council seats are up for election in midterm years and even numbered districts are up for election in Presidential election years. For the upcoming midterm election, Council Districts 1, 3, 5, and 7 will be on the ballot.

== Council Leadership ==
Article V of the City Charter requires that on the first Tuesday after the first Monday in January, the Council shall elect a President of the Council from among its members to serve for a one-year term. The Council Rules of Procedure further permit the City Council to elect a Vice President to serve as Acting President in the absence of the President. Effective January 2026, the Council President is no longer elected on a strictly rotational basis and the previous year's President is eligible to stand for election for an additional consecutive term. The most recent occurrence was in 2026 when Mike Karbassi was elected Council President for a second consecutive term (before stepping down in March 2026 to focus on other commitments).

The President serves as the Presiding Officer at Council meetings. Additionally, should the Office of the Mayor become vacant, it shall be filled by the President of the Council as provided on Article III of the Charter. The current Council President is Nelson Esparza (District 7). The current Council Vice President is Tyler Maxwell (District 4).

== Members ==
City council is made up of seven members, elected by district:

- District 1 (west-central) – Annalisa Perea
- District 2 (northwest) – Mike Karbassi
- District 3 (southwest and downtown) – Miguel Angel Arias
- District 4 (east-central) – Tyler Maxwell (Council Vice President)
- District 5 (southeast) – Brandon Vang
- District 6 (northeast) – Nick Richardson
- District 7 (central) – Nelson Esparza (Council President)

The council meets in Fresno City Hall.
