= Nancy Rappaport =

American psychiatrist

Nancy Rappaport is an American board certified child and adolescent psychiatrist. She is an associate professor of psychiatry at Harvard Medical School and the attending child and adolescent psychiatrist at Cambridge Health Alliance, a Harvard teaching affiliate, where she also is the director of school-based programs. She has consulted for Cambridge Public Schools for nearly two decades, and oversees the Teen Health Center at Cambridge Rindge & Latin School.

Rappaport blogs often for the Huffington Post, and is the author of a memoir, In Her Wake: A Child Psychiatrist Explores the Mystery of Her Mother's Suicide (Basic Books, 2009) and The Behavior Code: A Practical Guide to Understanding and Teaching the Most Challenging Students, co-authored with behavior analyst Jessica Minahan.

== Personal background ==
Rappaport was born in Boston, Massachusetts. Her father is a Boston developer.

Her early life was shaped by the suicide of her mother when Rappaport was only four years old. Rappaport's mother overdosed on sleeping pills after a contentious divorce and losing a child custody battle in 1963.

The youngest of six siblings, Rappaport was kept in the dark about the facts of her mother's suicide when she was growing up. Rappaport said that she has only one memory of her mother, standing in the hot sun with her, holding hands.

It was not until Rappaport had her first daughter that she began wanting to understand her mother's suicide and began investigating her life. She was given her mother's journals and a 400-page roman à clef written by her mother that provided some insight. She began writing In Her Wake while her daughter slept and published it in 2009. The memoir was awarded the Julia Ward Howe Book Award by the Boston Authors Club in 2010.

Rappaport stated in an interview: "As a child psychiatrist I wanted to explore what may have happened to my mother as she was growing up that could have made her vulnerable to depression. I wanted to see if there were any clues about how my mother came to see suicide as the only viable option, and how she came to believe that she was expendable."

Rappaport has three children with architect Colin Flavin.

== Education and research ==
Rappaport earned a B.A. in English from Princeton University before graduating from Tufts University School of Medicine in 1988.

Between college and medical school, Rappaport taught science at The Children's Storefront School in Harlem, New York. Rappaport and the school were the subject of the Oscar-nominated documentary film, The Children’s Storefront.

Rappaport's expertise focuses on the intersection of psychiatry and education. She writes often on the topics of psychopharmacology, behavioral issues in children and adolescents, school violence, and ways educators can cope with and respond to students with behavioral difficulties. In 2011, she received the American Academy of Child and Adolescent Psychiatry's 2011 Sidney Berman Award for School-Based Study and Intervention for Learning Disorders and Mental Health. Rappaport was also honored in 2013 with the Art of Healing Award, given by the Cambridge Health Alliance, which "celebrates visionary men and women who transcend boundaries, joyfully embrace humanity, and profoundly inspire the healing of body and spirit".

She frequently lectures at national hospitals and psychiatric conferences.

== Awards and honors ==
- 2010, Julia Ward Howe Book Award by the Boston Authors Club
