= Alasdair Roberts =

Alasdair Roberts may refer to:

- Alasdair Roberts (academic) (born 1961), Canadian political scientist
- Alasdair Roberts (musician) (born 1977), Scottish singer-songwriter
