= Jerome Lyle Rappaport =

American philanthropist (1927–2021)

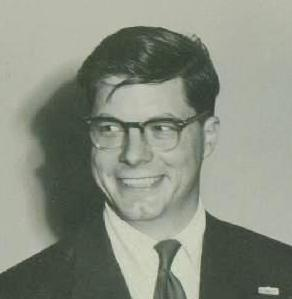
- Born: August 17, 1927; New York City, U.S.
- Died: December 6, 2021 (aged 94); Lincoln, Massachusetts, U.S.
- Education: Harvard University (BA, LLB, MPA)
- Occupations: Developer, Lawyer, Philanthropist
- Known for: Rebuilding Boston's West End, philanthropic efforts, contributions to public policy in Boston as well as City of Boston election process.
- Political party: Republican
- Board member of: Atlantic Classical Orchestra, Brigham and Women's Hospital, Cure Alzheimer's Fund, Dean's Council (Harvard University), Massachusetts General Hospital, McLean Hospital, New Boston Fund, Inc., Phyllis and Jerome Lyle Rappaport Foundation (Donor and Board Member), Program on Education Policy and Governance at Harvard University, Rappaport Center for Law and Public Policy at Boston College Law School, Rappaport Center at Temple Beit HaYam, Rappaport Institute of Greater Boston at Harvard Kennedy School of Government
- Spouse: Phyllis Cohen Rappaport (Present) Barbara Scott Sears (Divorced) Nancy Vahey (Divorced)
- Parent(s): Arthur and Cora Rappaport
- Relatives: Sandra Sommer (sister)
- Website: rappaportfoundation.org

Jerome Lyle Rappaport (August 17, 1927 – December 6, 2021) was an American lawyer, developer, political leader, and landlord. Rappaport is also known for his philanthropy in Boston, Massachusetts, and Stuart, Florida. He was the general partner of one of the most controversial developments of the urban renewal era, the West End Project, from which he created a 48-acre urban neighborhood known as Charles River Park.

== Early life and politics ==
Rappaport, born and raised in the Bronx and Manhattan's Upper West Side, was the son of a clothier of Romanian Jewish extraction. In 1938 Rappaport was a contestant on the 1938 Whiz Kids program that was hosted on WHN Radio in New York.

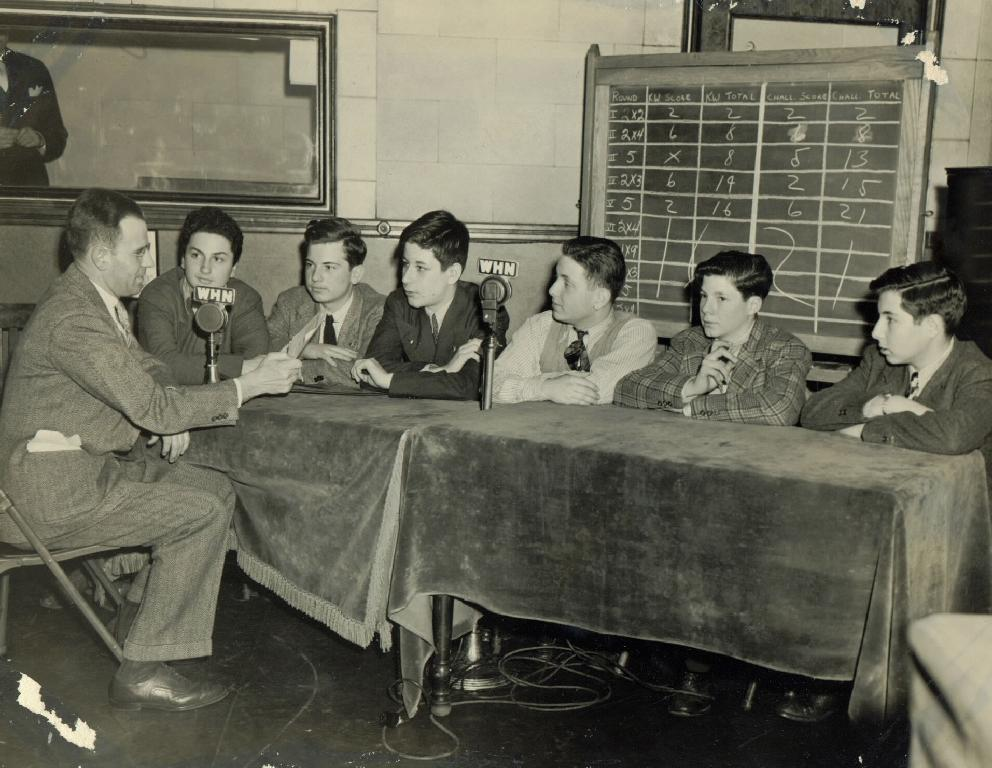
Rappaport, second from right in Whiz Kids, 1938

Rappaport entered Harvard University at 16 years of age and received a Bachelor of Arts and Bachelor of Laws degree in 1949, when he was 21. He earned a Master of Public Administration from the Littauer School (today the Harvard Kennedy School) in 1963.

As a student, Rappaport founded the Harvard Law School Forum, which was originally dedicated to the memory of Joseph P. Kennedy Jr. and 102 other Harvard Law School graduates and former students on leave who had died in World War II. The Forum's Friday evening radio broadcasts on WHDH in 1946 garnered positive press and inspired the participation of Harvard's then-president, law school dean, faculty members, and students.

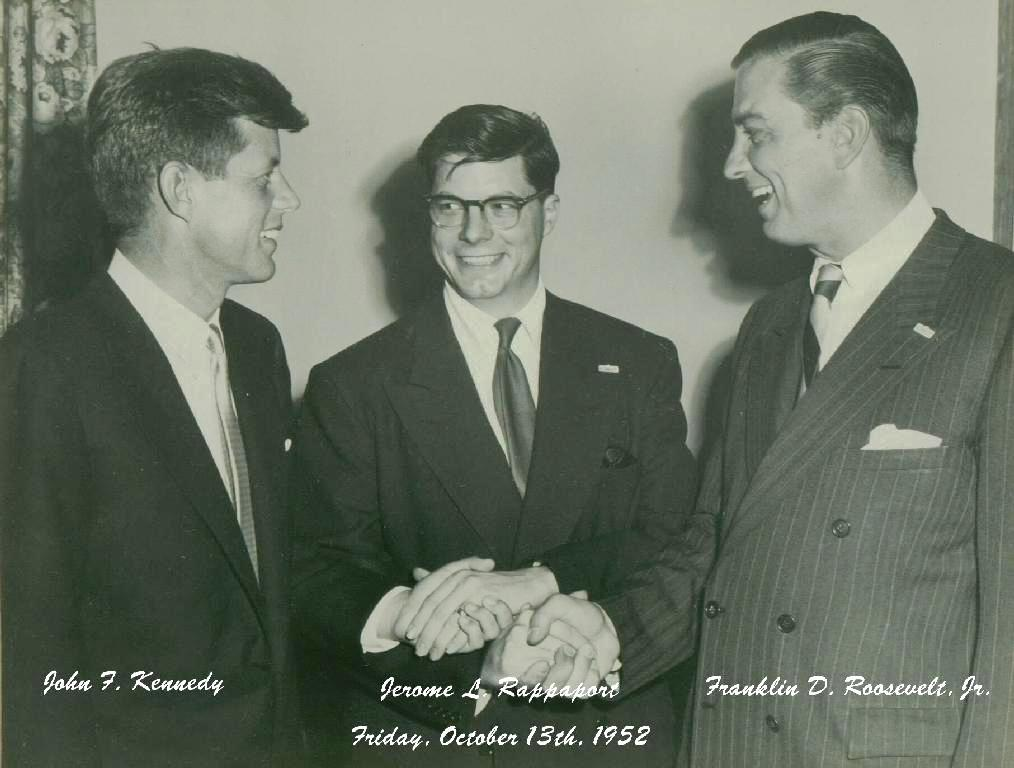
Congressman John F. Kennedy and Congressman Franklin D. Roosevelt Jr. of New York pose with Rappaport during a Democratic Party fundraiser at the home of Boston newspaper publisher Harry Harwich in 1952.

The Harvard Law School Forum Inaugural event was held on March 8, 1946, "War Crime Trials" (Revolution in legal theory or law enforcement?). “Unrest Within the Democratic Party” (Eleanor Roosevelt and others) – May 1, 1961- Part I, Part II; Martin Luther King, Jr., “The Future of Integration” (October 24, 1962 – Part I, Part II); Other famous Forum speakers have included President John F. Kennedy, President Jimmy Carter, Supreme Court Justice Thurgood Marshall, consumer advocate Ralph Nader, and Cuban leader Fidel Castro.

In the early 1950s, Rappaport quickly emerged as one of Boston's best-known political leaders. The peak occurred when Rappaport succeeded Congressman John F. Kennedy in receiving the Massachusetts Jaycees "Distinguished Service" award as Massachusetts' most Outstanding Young Leader for 1952. Kennedy's award was one of many steppingstones on the road to his becoming a United States Senator. Rappaport's acceptance speech in January 1953 was mostly geared towards inspiring wealthier and more seasoned local businessmen to invest everything they could in Boston's then-languishing economic development program, and "to give more time, energy, and thought to community affairs."

Prior to that his efforts helped John Hynes beat James Michael Curley in the watershed city elections of 1949. The following year Rappaport started to become a centerpiece of Boston's political reform movement when he created the New Boston Committee (NBC). Rappaport received national attention while Curley's popularity spiraled downward. The NBC reached its highest point when ten of the fifteen elected officials who served the city from 1952 to 1954 had been endorsed by the NBC. After Curley's unsuccessful attempt to dismiss the NBC, as a reincarnation of the so-called "Goo-goos" that he had rallied working-class Bostonians against for years, Curley said that he quit the 1951 mayor's race because it was "imperative that...all the candidates endorsed by the New Boston Committee be defeated." Six years later, Rappaport was one of the so-called "enemies" Boston's Rascal King aimed to bury through disparaging remarks published in Curley's autobiography, "I'd Do It All Again."

During this period Rappaport also worked in the John Hynes Administration, established a private law office, and taught a political science class at Boston University. He earned public praise for creating the short-lived Greater Boston Area Council (GBAC), which indirectly led to the creation of the Metropolitan Area Planning Council and Greater Boston's first public television station, WGBH-TV Channel 2.

== Urban renewal ==
Less than two years after the NBC and GBAC disbanded during the summer of 1954, Rappaport, Seon Pierre Bonan (a Connecticut and New York City-based developer) and Theodore Shoolman (Boston Realtor whose late father had built The Wang Theatre) began a forty-year business partnership by acquiring the rights to redevelop Boston's West End neighborhood, as part of the national urban renewal program launched by the Housing Act of 1949. After a sixteen-year construction phase the West End Project was ultimately completed. It launched a long era of luxury housing construction in Boston that slowed decades of decentralization. Throughout the 1960s Charles River Park symbolized the critical early successes of the "New Boston" - "proof that higher income families could still be attracted back to the city."

In early 1977, Rappaport was approached by Thomas O'Neill III, then Massachusetts lieutenant governor and the son of U.S. House Speaker "Tip" O'Neill, a friend of Rappaport's, to be part of a group to "Help Cuba become more democratized". Rappaport had met Castro in 1959, when the Cuban leader spoke at the Harvard Law Forum, which Rappaport had founded a decade before. Rappaport and his wife, Phyllis, met and talked with Castro and discussed the many housing projects in Cuba. Rappaport and the group accompanying him toured local schools, restaurants and neighborhoods.

== Personal life, family and legacy ==
Rappaport was married three times. His first marriage to Nancy Vahey produced six children: Martha, Amy, Judy, James "Jim", Jerry Jr., and Nancy. In 1963, Nancy Vahey Rappaport committed suicide after a two-year custody battle where she tirelessly sought custody for her six children. Rappaport's second marriage was to Barbara Scott Sears. Barbara had three children from her previous marriage to Dick Sears: Rappaport was highly involved in their upbringing and often refers to them as his children. Together Rappaport and Barbara had two children of their own. The marriage ended in divorce after 10 years. His third and final marriage was to Phyllis Rappaport, who is twenty years his junior. Her previous marriage was to a man with the same surname pronunciation, but spelled - Rapaport. Phyllis has two children. Together, Rappaport and Phyllis have no children.

In 2006, Boston Magazine named Rappaport the 45th wealthiest Bostonian, with a net worth of about $300 million. It also named the Rappaport family Boston's seventh most influential family.

Rappaport donated his former eight bedroom Roxbury, Massachusetts mansion to the Roxbury Latin School. Thereafter, the school briefly used the mansion to house faculty. After years of disrepair, the school demolished the mansion. The school later renamed the school's football field after Rappaport, calling it Rappaport Field.

Rappaport has been commended publicly and received lifetime achievement awards from the American Jewish Committee and Greater Boston Real Estate Board for being an accomplished real estate pioneer and industry leader, a generous philanthropist, and one of the principal architects of the New Boston. He received an honorary Doctor of Laws degree from Suffolk University in 1998, for "his career of outstanding accomplishments and public service and for his role in reshaping the city's West End neighborhood."

His reputation has also been negatively impacted by a chorus of scholarly and non-scholarly opinions about urban renewal and, in particular, his signature development which resulted from the City of Boston's decision to gentrify a working-class neighborhood. The most widely known book on the subject is "The Urban Villagers," Herbert J. Gans critical analysis of the old area's clearance as an alleged "slum" and the West Enders' displacement from their neighborhood. The West End-Charles River Park experience has been covered thousands of times in books, magazine articles, newspaper columns, and undergraduate and postgraduate papers.

Today, urban planning students are asked to consider if the positive value of the Charles River Park development—consisting of 2,300 units of skyscraper housing, 500,000 square feet (46,000 m^{2}) of retail and office space, 3,400 parking spaces, and an affordable housing building for senior citizens—is outweighed by the destruction of the old West End, and the negative experiences of many whom the City evicted prior to this seminal political, economic and urban planning event.

On Rappaport's 88th birthday in 2015, Boston City Council declared that August 15 will be known as "Jerry Rappaport Day." Rappaport was presented a street sign "Rappaport Way" which will be the new name of a street in Boston's West End. Hundreds attended the party at the Four Seasons hotel in Boston to honor Rappaport and his life.

Rappaport died at his home in Lincoln, Massachusetts, on December 6, 2021.

== Philanthropy ==
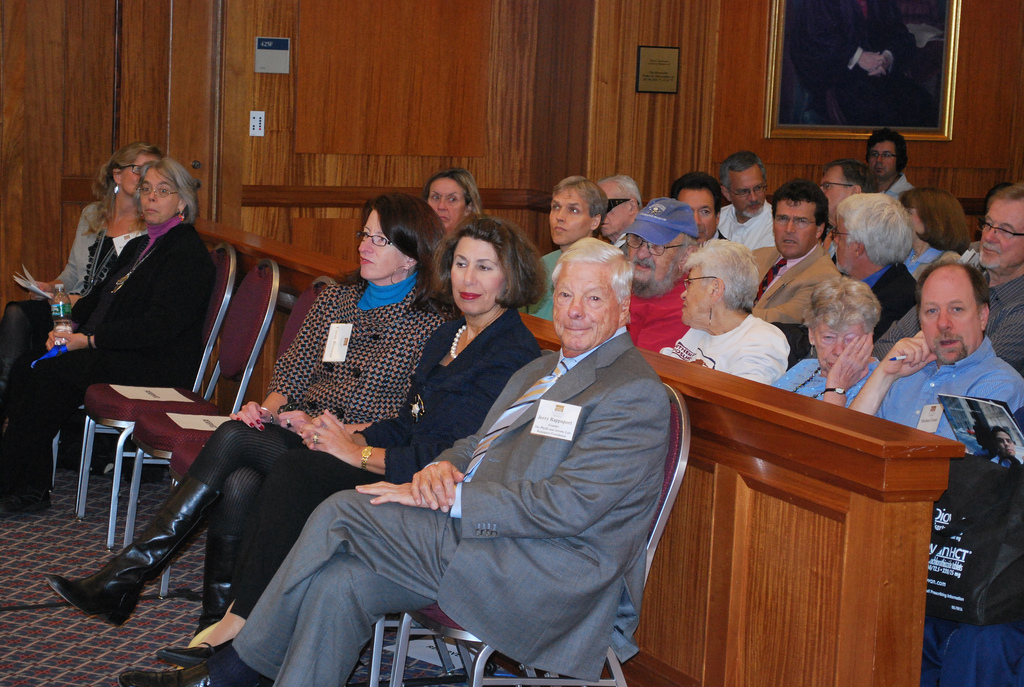
Rappaport attends a roundtable discussion on new journalism hosted by the Rappaport Center and the Ford Hall Forum in 2009.

In 1997 Rappaport and his wife established the Phyllis and Jerome Lyle Rappaport Foundation. It has since donated more than $30 million to efforts focusing on public policy, health, and the arts. The bulk of the money has gone to the Rappaport Institute for Greater Boston at Harvard Kennedy School and the Rappaport Center for Law and Public Policy at Boston College Law School. Rappaport's wife, Phyllis, chairs the foundation. Rappaport's two grandsons, James Rappaport Jr., and Diego Arambula, along with stepson, Jonathan Rapaport, serve on the board.

The foundation support the Rappaport MGH Grand Challenge Award, which was launched in 2025. The $3 million grant is awarded to "an innovative, high-impact, multidisciplinary team working to transform the prevention, diagnosis, and treatment of medical conditions".

In 1993, Rappaport and other members of the community came together and donated funds to build a Jewish temple in Martin County, Florida. Temple Beit HaYam opened September 1993.

In 1993, along with two of his sons and wife, Phyllis, Rappaport founded the New Boston Fund. Headquartered in Boston, New Boston Fund had grown to include fully staffed regional investment offices in the Washington, D.C. area and Florida. The firm's investment activity totaled more than 23 million square feet of commercial real estate and more than 7,500 residential units. The office space was designed by Architect Colin Flavin. Flavin is married to Rappaport's daughter, Nancy.

The Rappaports are donors to Nantucket Cottage Hospital on Nantucket Island, Massachusetts. Rappaport and his wife attend the annual Boston Pops on Nantucket concert at Jetties Beach. The concert is held annually in August to raise funds for the hospital.

In 2000 Rappaport and his wife Phyllis funded the Rappaport Prize at the deCordova Museum to recognize exceptional contemporary artists with a connection to New England. Prior recipients of the prize: Daniela Rivera (2019), Titus Kaphar (2018), Sam Durant (2017), Barkley L. Hendricks (2016), Matt Saunders (2015), Liz Deschenes (2014), Ann Pibal (2013), Suara Welitoff (2012), Orly Genger (2011), Liza Johnson (2010), David Cole (2009), Ursula von Rydingsvard (2008), Maria Magdalena Campos-Pons (2007), Abelardo Morell (2006), Sara Walker (2005), Debra Olin (2004), John Bisbee (2003), Lars-Erik Fisk (2002), Anne Spileos Scott (2001), Jennifer Hall (2000).

In 2004, Rappaport and his wife, Phyllis, along with co-founders Henry McCance, Jacqui and Jeffrey Morby, co-founded the Cure Alzheimer's Fund. Cure Alzheimer's Fund is one of the leading Alzheimer's research foundations in the United States. All organizational expenses are paid for by the Founders and the other Board members by allowing all other contributions to be applied directly to Alzheimer's Disease research.

Rappaport and his wife are supporters and contributors to the Martin County Library System, and Martin Health System in Stuart, Florida.

Rappaport was also a supporter and donor to the Atlantic Classical Orchestra in Florida. Rappaport served as chairman of the board of directors from 2013 until 2017. In 2013, ACO was awarded the Rappaport Prize for music composition. The prize is given annually to individuals whose work in public policy, the arts, and science is exceptional. The prize for music composition is $100,000. Works that have been commissioned as a result of the Prize are as follows: For the inaugural year (2014) there were 2 commissioned works: Commission I - Garth Neustadter; Commission II - Jeffrey Parola; Violin Concerto, "The Infinite Dance" by the Chinese-American composer Zhou Tian and performed by Caroline Goulding (2014-2015); Concerto for Piano, "The Oneiroi in New York," by Conrad Tao (2016-2017). The final Prize was awarded during the 2017–2018 season to Hannah Lash. Hannah Lash world premiered "Facets of Motion" in April 2018.

In 2014, The Rappaport Center for Law and Public Policy moved to Boston College Law School from Suffolk University as a result of a $7.53 million gift from the Phyllis & Jerome Lyle Rappaport Foundation. The gift was the largest in the 85-year history of BC Law and funded the Rappaport Center and the Jerome Lyle Rappaport Visiting Professorship in Law and Public Policy at BC Law.
