= Marketing of war =

Concept in political science

The marketing of war is a concept introduced by Professor Kostas Gouliamos (European University Cyprus) and Dr. Antonis L. Theocharous (Cyprus University of Technology) in 2008. In their paper "Harming Democracy in Mediolatry Societies: Decoding the Marketing of War and Animosities through Photo Images", the authors consider the consumption of war through utilization of marketing and, in particular, of social marketing.

== Background ==
The marketing of war has been described as a key element of the form of militarism known as neomilitarism. Neomilitarism has been defined by Alasdair Roberts as a form of militarism that is distinguished by the reliance on a relatively small number of volunteer fighters; heavy reliance on complex technologies; and the rationalization and expansion of government advertising and recruitment programs designed to promote military service.

The concept has been further developed in the book The Marketing of War in the Age of Neo-Militarism, also co-edited by Gouliamos and Kassimeris. They argue that the marketing of war is shaped by the mechanisms of manufacturing decision-making of the lobbying industry on both sides of Atlantic. As a result of the intensification and escalation of the 'marketing of war', the whole civil society is heavily militarized while LifeWorld is colonized by the apparatus of stratocracy.

Moreover, the book assesses the inherent meaning of such militarization from a critical, interdisciplinary perspective. Against the background of democracy and capitalism, The Marketing of War in the Age of Neo-Militarism challenges prevailing accounts of the "military–industrial complex" as it explores significant interrelated themes denoting the accelerating process of militarization of society.
