= Jeffrey Liebman =

American economist (born 1967)

Jeff Liebman
- Born: 1967 (age 58–59)
- Political party: Democratic

Academic background
- Education: Yale University (BA); Harvard University (MA, PhD)
- Doctoral advisor: Martin Feldstein; Lawrence F. Katz

Jeffrey B. Liebman (born c. 1967) is an American economist and academic. Since 2014, Liebman has served as director of the Rappaport Institute for Greater Boston at Harvard Kennedy School.

During the Obama administration, Liebman served within the Office of Management and Budget (OMB). Prior to this, Liebman was a top economic advisor for Barack Obama's 2008 presidential campaign.

== Early life and education ==
Liebman was born in 1967 to Lance and Carol B. Liebman. His father is a professor at Columbia Law School and a former director of the American Law Institute. His mother is a professor of clinical law at Columbia Law School. Liebman's brother, Benjamin L. Liebman, is a professor of Chinese law at Columbia Law School.

Liebman attended Yale University, where he graduated magna cum laude in 1989 with a bachelor's degree with distinction in economics and political science. He went on to study at Harvard University, where he received a Ph.D. in economics in 1996.

== Career ==
Liebman is the Malcolm Wiener Professor of Public Policy and serves as the director of the Taubman Center for State and Local Government, the Rappaport Institute for Greater Boston, and Social Impact Bond Technical Assistance Lab, all at the John F. Kennedy School of Government at Harvard University. He teaches courses in social policy, public sector economics, and American economic policy.

Liebman's research includes tax and budget policy, social insurance, poverty, and income inequality. Recently he has examined the impacts of government programs such as the Earned Income Tax Credit, Social Security, and housing vouchers. He is also a research associate at the National Bureau of Economic Research (NBER), and a member of the Academic Advisory Committee at the Center for American Progress (CAP).

In 2019, Liebman was elected as a fellow of the National Academy of Public Administration.

=== Government ===
From 1998 to 1999 he served as Special Assistant to the President for economic policy and coordinated the Clinton administration's Social Security reform technical working group. During the Obama administration, Liebman served in the Office of Management and Budget (OMB) as executive associate director and chief economist and then as the acting deputy director for policy.

Political offices
Preceded by Rob Nabors	Acting Deputy Director of the Office of Management and Budget; 2010–2011	Succeeded by Heather Higginbottom
