= Barbara Aronstein Black =

American legal scholar (1933–2026)

- Born: May 6, 1933; Borough Park, New York, U.S.
- Died: January 20, 2026 (aged 92); Philadelphia, Pennsylvania, U.S.
- Education: Brooklyn College (BA); Columbia University (LLB); Yale University (PhD)
- Occupation: Academic
- Spouse: Charles Black
- Children: 3

Barbara Aronstein Black (May 6, 1933 – January 20, 2026) was an American legal scholar. She was the first woman to be a dean of an Ivy League law school when she became the dean of Columbia Law School in 1986. Black was the George Wellwood Murray Professor of Legal History at Columbia.

== Early life and career ==
Born and raised in Brooklyn on May 6, 1933, Black received her B.A. from Brooklyn College in 1953, her LL.B. from Columbia Law School in 1955, and a Ph.D. from Yale University in 1975. While at law school, she was editor of the Columbia Law Review.

Black was elected a fellow of the American Academy of Arts and Sciences in 1989 and a member of the American Philosophical Society in 1991. She was also for two years the president of the American Society for Legal History.

Her work was concentrated in the area of contracts and legal history. She received the Elizabeth Blackwell Award and the Federal Bar Association Prize of Columbia Law School.

== Personal life and death ==
Barbara Black was the widow of the constitutional scholar and civil rights pioneer Charles Black. They had three children, two sons and a daughter. She left academia for a time to focus on raising her children, returning in 1965. She died in Philadelphia on January 20, 2026, at the age of 92.

Academic offices
Preceded by Benno C. Schmidt Jr.	Dean of Columbia Law School; 1986–1991	Succeeded by Lance Liebman
