= Charles L. Black, Jr. =

American legal scholar

Charles Black
- Born: Charles Lund Black, Jr. September 22, 1915; Austin, Texas, U.S.
- Died: May 5, 2001 (aged 85); New York City, New York, U.S.
- Education: University of Texas at Austin (BA, MA); Yale University (LLB)
- Occupation: Law professor
- Spouse: Barbara Aronstein Black

Charles Lund Black, Jr. (September 22, 1915 – May 5, 2001) was an American scholar of constitutional law, which he taught as professor of law from 1947 to 1999. He is best known for his role in the historic Brown v. Board of Education Supreme Court case, as well as for his Impeachment: A Handbook, which served for many Americans as a trustworthy analysis of the law of impeachment during the Watergate scandal.

== Early life and career ==
Born in Austin, Texas, Black graduated from the University of Texas at Austin in 1935 and later obtained a master's degree in English. He received his LL.B. from Yale Law School in 1943, then served in the Army Air Forces as a teacher and as an associate at Davis, Polk, Wardwell, Sunderland & Kiendl. In 1947, he became a professor of law at the Columbia University Law School, where he wrote legal briefs for the successful 1954 Brown v. Board of Education suit. He also was involved in civil rights cases in the south.

In 1956, he joined Yale Law School as its first Henry R. Luce Professor of Jurisprudence. He was appointed Sterling Professor of Law in 1975. During his thirty-one-year career at Yale, he wrote numerous books, including The People and the Court, Structure and Relationship in Constitutional Law, and Impeachment: A Handbook. Black, along with Grant Gilmore, co-authored The Law of Admiralty, an influential text on maritime law. Black's students at Yale included Hillary Clinton.

An outspoken critic of the death penalty, Black also authored Capital Punishment: The Inevitability of Caprice and Mistake. Black was critical of what he called the United States' "special relationship" with Israel and stated in 1989 that he had "for a long time been outraged by Israel’s cruelly implemented disdain of Palestinian human rights, and on that account have long opposed American aid to Israel".

Black was elected a Fellow of the American Academy of Arts and Sciences in 1976. He returned to Columbia Law School in 1986, when his wife Barbara Aronstein Black became dean there. He served as adjunct professor of law until 1999. In 1987 and 1988, he served as the Wayne Morse Chair of Law and Politics, established in honor of the late former Senator, at the University of Oregon.

Upon his passing, Akhil Amar called Black "his hero" and said that Black "had the moral courage to go against his race, his class, his social circle".

== Personal life ==
Black began writing poetry at the age of 40, publishing three volumes, Telescopes and Islands, Owls Bay in Babylon and The Waking Passenger. While a freshman at University of Texas, Black attended a performance by Louis Armstrong at the Driskill Hotel in Austin, an event that he claimed inspired his interest in race and civil rights. Black, who held an annual "Armstrong Evening" at Yale until the musician's death in 1971, was featured in the 2001 Ken Burns miniseries, Jazz.

== Selected works ==
- 1957 – The Law of Admiralty, by Grant Gilmore and Charles Black
- 1958 – Old and New Ways in Judicial Review
- 1960 – The People and the Court: Judicial Review in a Democracy
- 1963 – Perspectives in Constitutional Law
- 1963 – Telescopes & Islands. Poems
- 1970 – The Unfinished Business of the Warren Court
- 1974 – Capital Punishment: The Inevitability of Caprice and Mistake 9780393055467
- 1974 – Impeachment: A Handbook
- 1981 – Decision According to Law 9780393332308
- 1985 – Structure and Relationship in Constitutional Law 9780918024442
- 1986 – The Humane Imagination 9780918024435
- 1997 – A New Birth of Freedom: Human Rights, Named and Unnamed 0-300-07734-3
