= Rappaport Center for Law and Public Policy =

Research institute in Massachusetts

Rappaport Center
- Research institute
- Boston College Law School
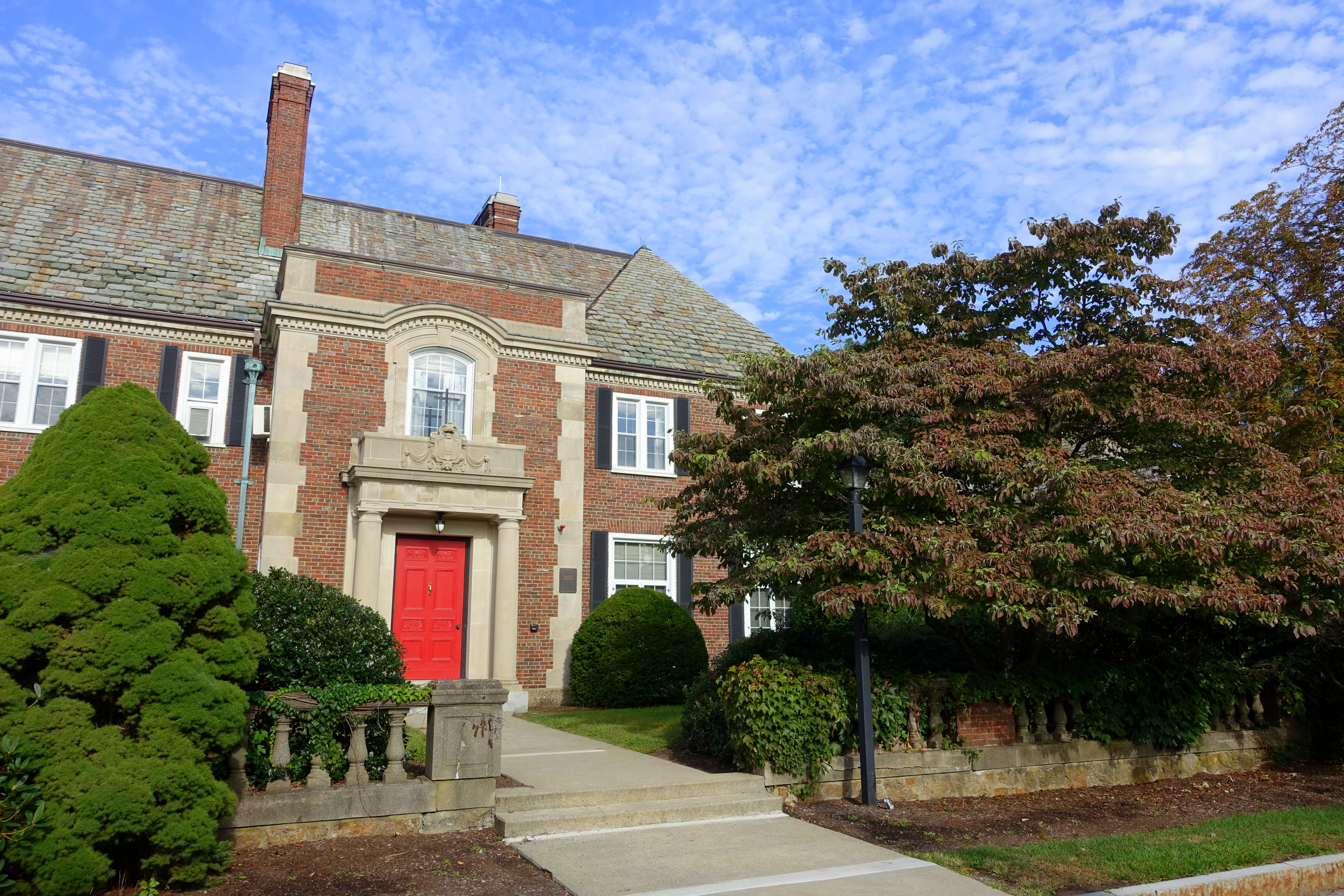
- Barat House
- Location: Newton Centre, Massachusetts, U.S.
- Full name: Rappaport Center for Law and Public Policy at Boston College Law School
- Established: 2014; 12 years ago
- Named for: Phyllis and Jerome Lyle Rappaport
- Former names: Rappaport Center for Law and Public Service
- Faculty Director: Daniel Kanstroom
- Executive Director: Amanda Teo
- Fellows: 12
- Website: https://www.bc.edu/content/bc-web/schools/law/centers/rappaport-center.html

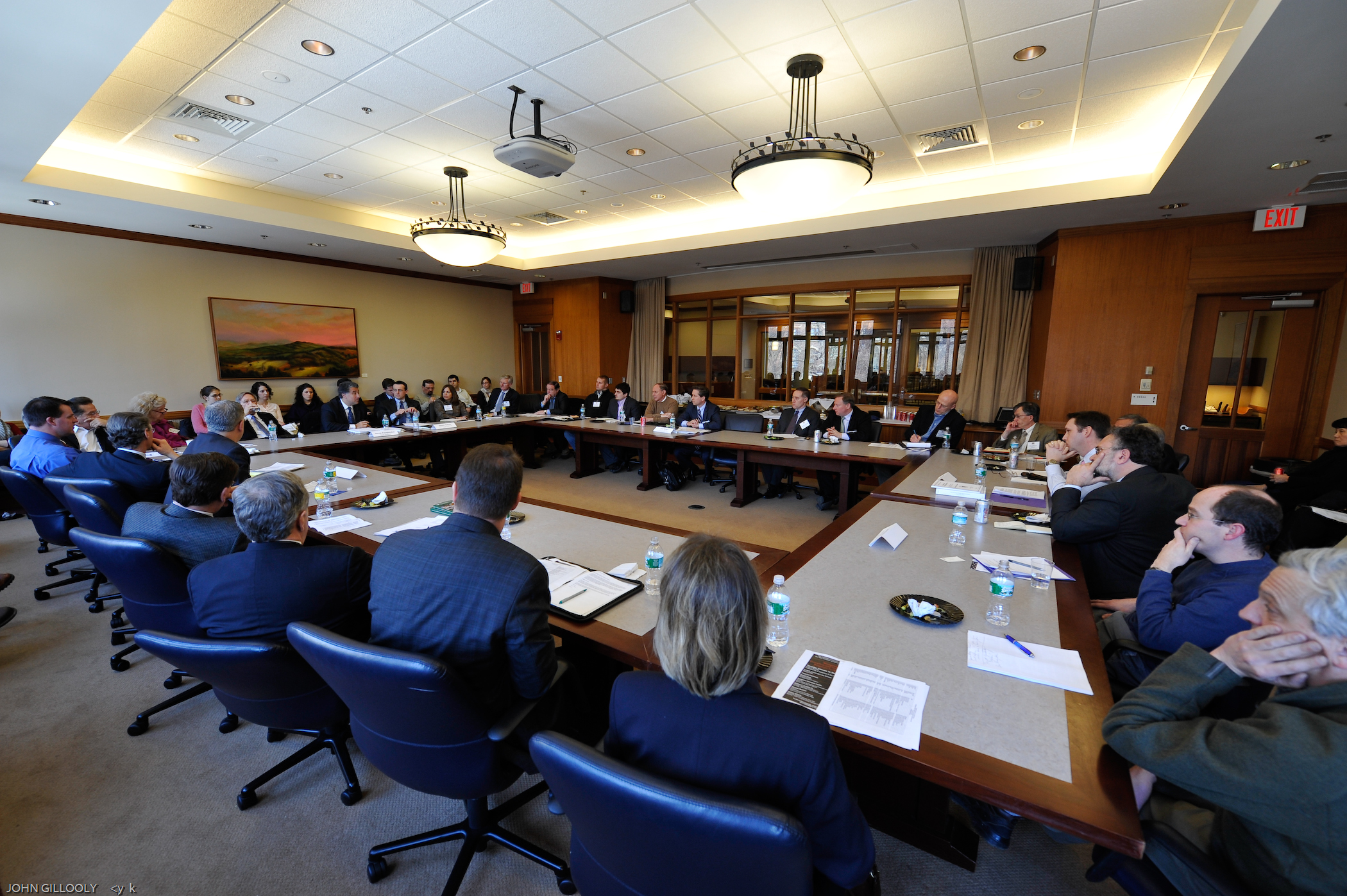
Roundtable on hosted by the Rappaport Center in January 2009

The Rappaport Center for Law and Public Policy is a privately endowed public interest law center administered by and located on the grounds of Boston College Law School Boston, Massachusetts. The center offers financial support and career counseling to individuals interested in public interest law and public policy work and provides a forum for discussion of such work. The center also occasionally commissions polls to gauge public attitudes on various public policy issues.

== History ==
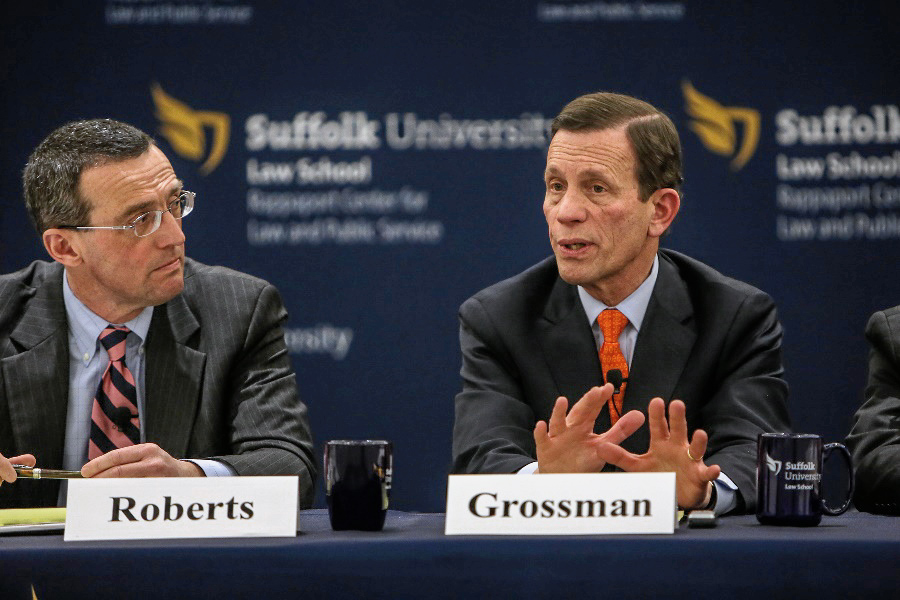
Alasdair Roberts and Massachusetts Treasurer Steve Grossman at the Rappaport Center for Law and Public Service in January 2014

The Rappaport Center for Law and Public Service was established at Suffolk University Law School in 2007, with the support of a gift from the Jerome L. Rappaport Foundation. The center was shut down by Suffolk University in August 2014 for financial reasons. Renamed the Rappaport Center for Law and Public Policy, it re-opened at Boston College Law School in the spring of 2015.

=== Rappaport Chair in Law and Public Policy ===
The Rappaport Chair in Law and Policy was established at Suffolk University in 2006 with a gift from the Jerome Lyle Rappaport Charitable Foundation, to provide a "a position for a nationally recognized academic leader in law and public policy." This was the first endowed chair in the history of Suffolk University. Alasdair Roberts was appointed as the Jerome Lyle Rappaport Professor of Law and Public Policy in 2008. The gift supporting the chair was returned to the donor in 2014.

== Rappaport Fellows ==
The center was created in part for the purpose of "educating, supporting and mentoring students with an interest in public policy and public service." To this end, the center now manages the law student portion of the Rappaport Fellows program, which was created in 2000 to provide summer public interest fellowships to students from each of the six Boston-area law schools: Boston College Law School, Boston University Law School, Harvard Law School, New England School of Law, Northeastern University Law School, and Suffolk University Law School. Fellowships for graduate students in other public policy-related disciplines are offered by the Rappaport Center's sister institution, the Rappaport Institute for Greater Boston at the John F. Kennedy School of Government at Harvard. Rappaport Fellows receive summer job placements that allow them to "work with top public policymakers and government officials on key issues that affect the citizens of Greater Boston and Massachusetts."

== Public interest career development ==
The center also provides career development information for students who wish to work in public interest law, including roles with non-profit organizations and government entities. According to director Susan Prosnitz, "Any student or alumni or any lawyer anywhere in Boston who is in pursuit of a career in public service can come here and get help getting there."

== Public interest events ==
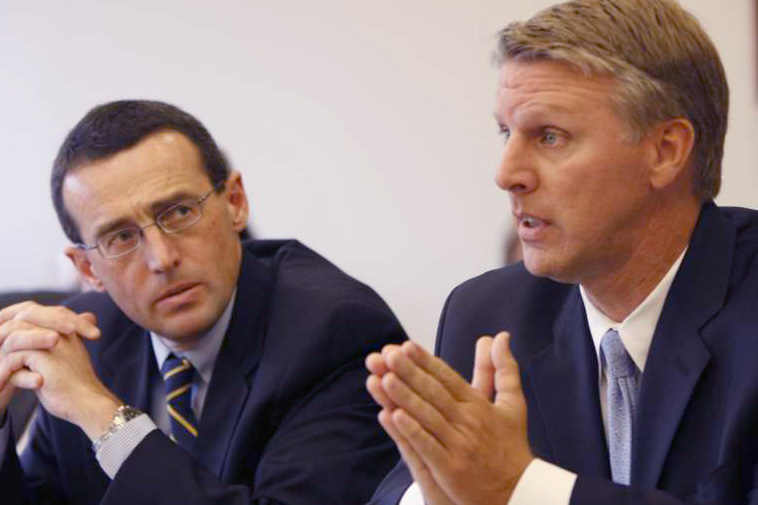
Massachusetts Treasurer Timothy Cahill (right) and Professor Alasdair Roberts (left) participate in roundtable discussion at Rappaport Center for Law and Public Service, Suffolk University Law School in October 2008

Besides its student-oriented programs, the Rappaport Center also sponsors and organizes numerous public policy symposia, lectures, and other events designed to promote "engagement in public issues for faculty, students, government officials and policymakers." The center is located in Boston's downtown across the street from the Massachusetts State House on Beacon Hill. Past programs have addressed such topics as government secrecy, child welfare, civil rights, professional ethics, managing the bailout and public accountability after the age of newspapers.

A February 2009 event brought together leading government representatives to discuss the management of the federal "bailout" of the financial sector.

The Center also holds periodic roundtables that provide a forum for open conversation on critical issues. The roundtables include a broad range of stakeholders and conversations are conducted on an off-the-record basis unless all panelists would prefer to hold an open discussion. Roundtables are held in the Law School's faculty boardroom from noon to 1:30pm, and are accompanied by a casual lunch.

The first roundtable was held on October 3, 2008, and addressed the federal response to the 2008 financial crisis. Speakers included Massachusetts Treasurer Timothy P. Cahill. The second roundtable on the state's budget crisis was hosted by the Center on January 30, 2009.
