= Benjamin L. Liebman =

American lawyer

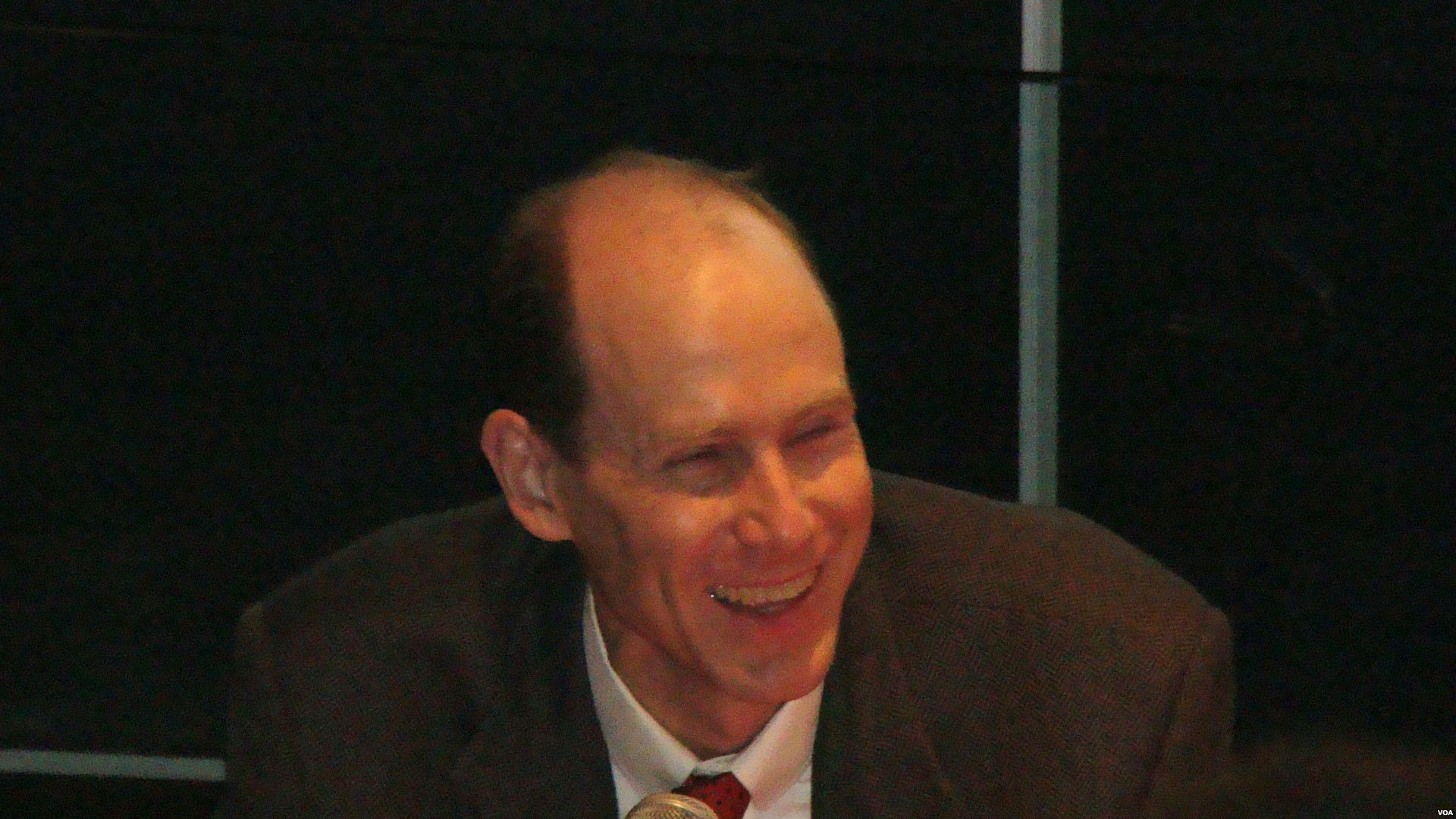
- Benjamin L. Liebman
- Born: 1969 (age 56–57)
- Education: Yale University (BA); Brasenose College, Oxford (BA); Harvard University (JD)
- Occupation: law professor
- Parent(s): Lance Liebman; Carol B. Liebman
- Relatives: Jeffrey B. Liebman (brother)

Benjamin L. Liebman (born 1969) is the Robert L. Lieff Professor of Law and the director of the Hong Yen Chang Center for Chinese Legal Studies at Columbia Law School. He is widely regarded as one of the world's pre-eminent scholars of contemporary Chinese law.

He is the son of Lance Liebman, who is a professor at Columbia Law School and the former director of the American Law Institute, and of Carol B. Liebman, also a professor at Columbia Law School. He is the brother of Jeffrey B. Liebman, who was the executive associate director of the Office of Management and Budget within the administration of President Barack Obama.

On February 9, 2012, Liebman met with Vice President of the United States Joe Biden at the White House to discuss human rights in China.

Liebman is affiliated with the Weatherhead East Asian Institute.

== Education ==
Liebman received a Bachelor of Arts from Yale University in 1991. He then earned a Bachelor of Arts in philosophy, politics and economics from Brasenose College, Oxford in 1993 and a Juris Doctor from Harvard Law School in 1998.

== Positions ==
- Robert L. Leiff Professor of Law and Director, Hong Yen Chang Center for Chinese Legal Studies, Columbia Law School, 2011-
- Professor of Law and Director, Center for Chinese Legal Studies, Columbia Law School, 2007-2011
- Associate Professor of Law and Director, Center for Chinese Legal Studies, Columbia Law School
- Sullivan & Cromwell, London, 2000-2002
- Law Clerk, Justice David H. Souter, Supreme Court of the United States, 1999-2000
- Law Clerk, Judge Sandra Lynch, United States Court of Appeals, First Circuit, Boston, 1997-1998
- Paul, Weiss, Rifkind, Wharton & Garrison, New York and Beijing, Summer 1997
- Institute of Law, Chinese Academy of Social Sciences, Beijing, Summer 1996
- Attorney, Coudert Brothers, Beijing, 1994-1995

== See also ==
- List of law clerks for the third seat of the Supreme Court of the United States
