= Lance Liebman =

American law professor (born 1941)

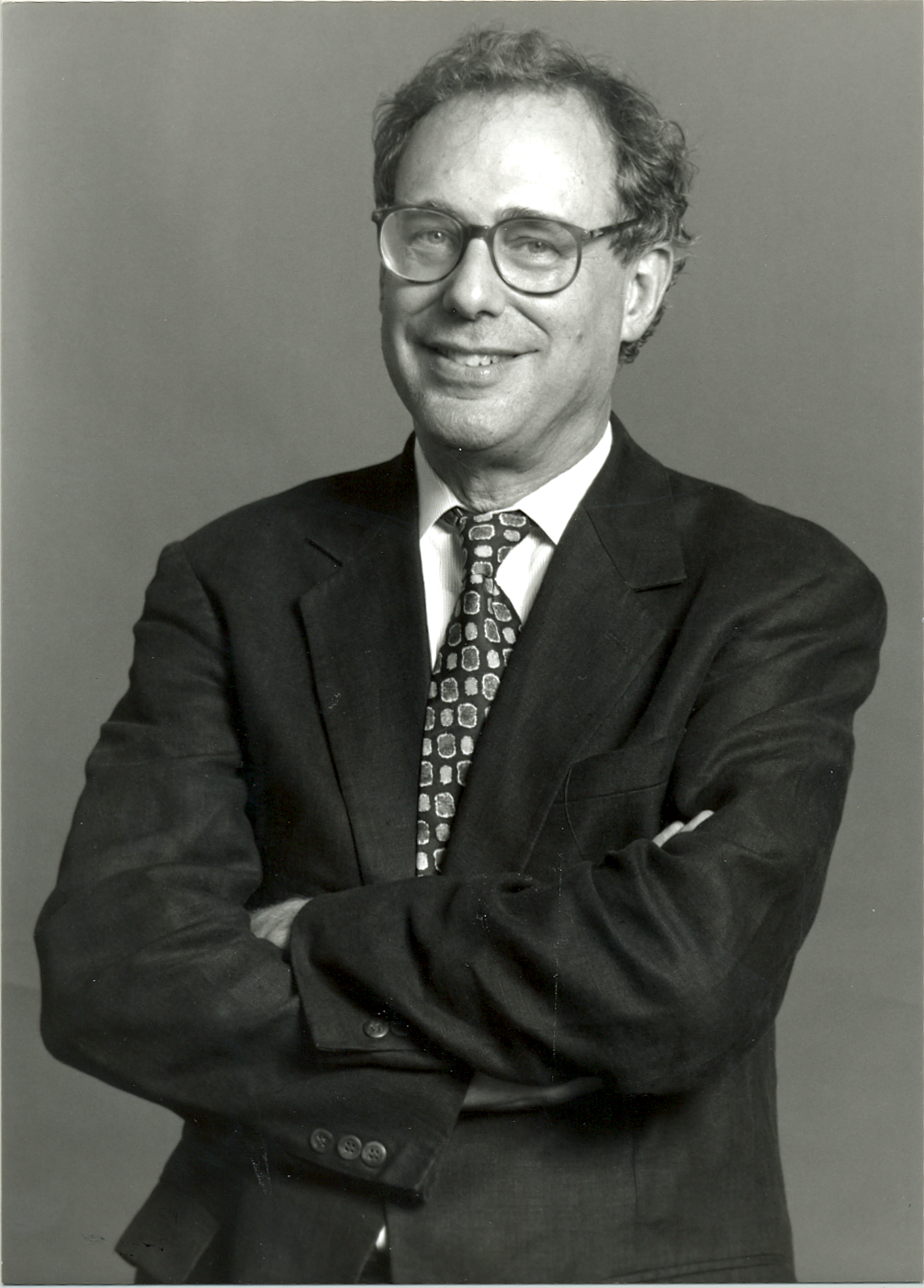
Liebman in 2014

Lance Liebman (born 1941) is an American law professor. He is the former dean of Columbia Law School, and served as the director of the American Law Institute from May 1999 to May 2014.

== Education ==
Liebman received his B.A. from Yale University in 1962, graduating summa cum laude with the Alpheus Henry Snow Prize, and earned an M.A. in history from the University of Cambridge in 1964. He graduated magna cum laude in 1967 from Harvard Law School, where he was president of the Harvard Law Review.

== Legal and academic career ==
After serving as a law clerk to Justice Byron White of the United States Supreme Court during the Court’s 1967 term, he spent two years working on transportation and community issues as an assistant to New York City Mayor John V. Lindsay. He joined the faculty of Harvard Law School in 1970 and remained there for 21 years, becoming a full professor in 1976 and serving as associate dean from 1981 to 1984.

In 1991 he moved to Columbia as Dean of the law school and as the Lucy G. Moses Professor of Law. He stepped down as dean in 1996 and was named the William S. Beinecke Professor of Law; the following year he was appointed director of the Parker School of Foreign and Comparative Law at Columbia.

=== Leadership of The American Law Institute ===
On May 16, 1999, Liebman was named director of the American Law Institute, the fifth person to hold the position, succeeding Geoffrey C. Hazard, Jr.

Under Liebman's leadership, the institute experienced a significant expansion of its law reform work with the commencement of 18 new projects, including the first project in the Restatement Fourth series, The Restatement Fourth, The Foreign Relations Law of the United States.

Works completed and published under Liebman’s stewardship include new Restatements of Agency, Property (Wills and Other Donative Transfers), Restitution and Unjust Enrichment, Torts: Apportionment, Torts: Liability for Physical and Emotional Harm, and Trusts, as well as Principles of the Law volumes on Aggregate Litigation, Family Dissolution, Intellectual Property, Software Contracts, Transnational Civil Procedure, and Transnational Insolvency. Also published were a proposed federal statute concerning recognition and enforcement of foreign judgments and 11 volumes on world trade law.

A final draft of The Restatement Third, Employment Law was approved by the membership of the American Law Institute at its May 2014 Annual Meeting on the final day of Liebman's tenure as director. It is expected to be published in early 2015.

=== International teaching experience ===
Liebman has had extensive international teaching experience. He was a Visiting Fulbright Professor of Law at Maharajah Sayajirao University in Baroda, India, a visiting lecturer at Tokyo University, and an adviser for the Japanese Institute of Labor. He also taught at the Harvard-Fulbright School in Ho Chi Minh City, Vietnam, and at the Hebrew University of Jerusalem.

== Research and writing ==
Liebman's research and teaching interests include employment law, legal ethics, comparative United States–Japanese social-welfare law, property law, and telecommunications law.

He is the author of A Concise Restatement of Property (2001), and the coauthor of Decentralizing City Government (1972), Property (2d ed. 1985), The Social Responsibilities of Lawyers, Case Studies (1988), and Employment Law (4th ed. 1998).

== Personal life ==
Married to Carol B. Liebman, who is clinical professor of law at Columbia Law School. They have two sons, Benjamin L. Liebman, who is the Robert L. Lieff Professor of Law and the director of the Center for Chinese Legal Studies at Columbia Law School, and Jeffrey B. Liebman, who is a professor of public policy at Harvard Kennedy School at Harvard University and served as an economic advisor to Barack Obama's presidential campaign.

== See also ==
- List of law clerks for the sixth seat of the Supreme Court of the United States

Academic offices
Preceded by Geoffrey C. Hazard, Jr.	Director of the American Law Institute; 1999–2014	Succeeded by Richard Revesz
Preceded by Barbara Aronstein Black	Dean of Columbia Law School; 1991–1996	Succeeded by David Leebron
