= Alan A. Altshuler =

American political scientist

Massachusetts Secretary of Transportation
- In office 1971–1975
- Governor: Francis W. Sargent
- Preceded by: Position created
- Succeeded by: Frederick P. Salvucci

Personal details
- Born: March 9, 1936 (age 90) Brooklyn, New York City, U.S.
- Spouse: Julie Maller (m. 1958)
- Education: Cornell University; University of Chicago
- Occupation: Professor

Alan Anthony Altshuler (born March 9, 1936, in Brooklyn, New York City) is an American educator and government official. Altshuler is the Ruth and Frank Stanton Professor in Urban Policy and Planning, Emeritus, at Harvard University's Graduate School of Design and Harvard Kennedy School.

== Career ==
Altshuler received a Bachelor of Arts from Cornell University and a Doctor of Philosophy from the University of Chicago.

Altshuler became the first director of the Boston Transportation Planning Review in 1970, and from 1971 through 1975, he served as the inaugural Massachusetts Secretary of Transportation. Since 1988, Altshuler has been director of the Taubman Center for State and Local Government, and until 1998, director of the Ford Foundation Program on Innovations in American Government.

Altshuler has taught at the Massachusetts Institute of Technology and Cornell University, as well as serving as dean at both the New York University Robert F. Wagner Graduate School of Public Service and the Harvard University Graduate School of Design. At Harvard, Altshuler also served as founding director of the Rappaport Institute for Greater Boston from 2000 to 2004.

Altshuler is a Fellow of the National Academy of Public Administration.

== Works ==
- The City Planning Process: A Political Analysis, 1970, ISBN 978-0801490811
- Community Control: The Black Demand for Participation in Large American Cities, 1970, ISBN 978-0672535178
- The Urban Transportation System: Politics and Policy Innovation, 1979, ISBN 978-0262010559
- The Future of the Automobile: The Report of MIT's International Automobile Program, 1985, ISBN 978-0262010818
- Regulation for Revenue: The Political Economy of Land Use Exactions, with Jose A. Gomez-Ibanez and Arnold M. Howitt, 1993, ISBN 978-0309065535
- Governance and Opportunity in Metropolitan America, 1999, ISBN 978-0309065535
- Mega-Projects: The Changing Politics of Urban Public Investment, with David Luberoff, 2003, ISBN 978-0815701286

== Personal life ==
Altshuler is the father of David Altshuler, a founding member of the Broad Institute and former Chief Scientific Officer of Vertex Pharmaceuticals.

Preceded by Peter G. Rowe	Dean; Harvard University Graduate School of Design; July 1, 2004 – December 31, 2007	Succeeded by Mohsen Mostafavi
