= Boston Transportation Planning Review =

1972 transit review of the Boston area

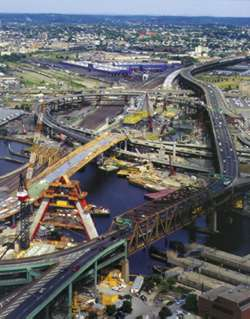
The Big Dig's Zakim Bunker Hill Bridge over the Charles River, in early phases of construction.

Boston Transportation Planning Review (BTPR), published in 1972, was a transportation planning program for metropolitan Boston, Massachusetts, which was responsible for analyzing and redesigning the entire area-wide transit and highway system in the 1970s. The major contractors involved were Alan M. Voorhees Company (Virginia), project manager; Skidmore, Owings and Merrill (New York City), architect; ESL Incorporated (California), air quality and acoustics. The program had close guidance from the national Transportation Research Board (TRB), a division of the US National Academy of Sciences. The first director of the program reporting to the Governor was Alan Altshuler; the project manager was Walter Hansen.

Comprehensive re-evaluation of areawide transportation plans was a major theme in the last quarter of the twentieth century for large US cities. The US Department of Transportation has said "the prototype for these reevaluations was the Boston Transportation Planning Review". Scope of the BTPR studies included evaluation and upgrading of all four MBTA mass transit rail lines and examination of every major highway and arterial project in the region.

== Major elements ==
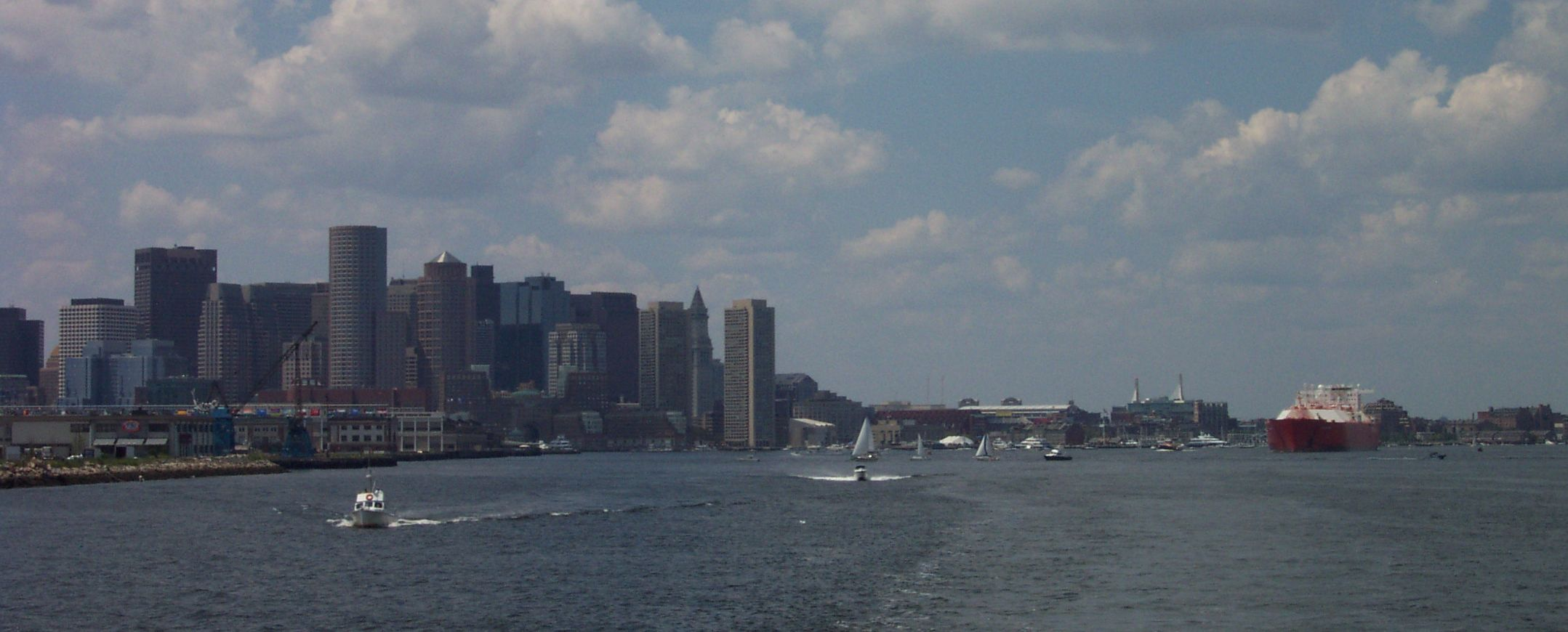
Downtown Boston from Boston Harbor

The following exemplify some of the principal study elements of the Boston Transportation Planning Review:

- Conceptual design of the rerouted Orange Line mass transit rail service to the southwest of Boston.
- Expansion plans for the Red Line mass transit Braintree and Northwest Corridor extensions.
- Moratorium on expressway construction inside of Route 128 for the decade.
- First concept of depressing the Central Artery, leading to the Big Dig.
- Upgrading of Route 1A from Boston to Salem.

== Technologies applied ==
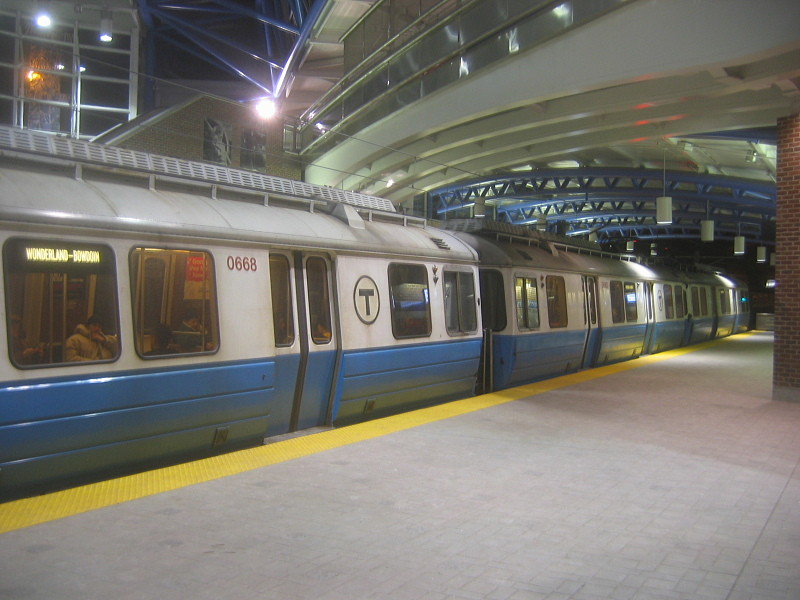
Blue Line train at the rebuilt Logan Airport station.

The following major technologies were utilized in the BTPR:

- Critical path work element diagrams to assist project management (Voorhees)
- Citywide traffic flow analysis including intersection level of service (Voorhees)
- Urban design of all physical structures and highway geometrics including neighborhood visual impacts (Skidmore, Owings and Merrill)
- Hydrology Impact Analysis to surface waters and groundwater affected by transit and roadway construction.
- Air quality and noise contour maps for all transportation alternatives (ESL)
- Wildlife and vegetation impact analysis for all alternatives.
- Public consultation Massachusetts Governor Francis W. Sargent involved concerned citizens in the development of transportation alternatives

== See also ==
- Megaproject
- Public transport
