= Geoffrey C. Hazard Jr. =

American lawyer and academic

- Born: Geoffrey Cornell Hazard Jr. September 18, 1929; Cleveland, Ohio, U.S.
- Died: January 11, 2018 (aged 88)
- Education: Swarthmore College (BA); Columbia University (LLB)
- Scientific career
- Fields: Civil procedure Legal ethics
- Workplaces: University of Pennsylvania Law School, University of California, Hastings College of the Law; Yale Law School
- Notable students: Samuel Alito, Glenn Reynolds

Geoffrey Cornell Hazard Jr. (September 18, 1929 – January 11, 2018) was an American legal scholar who was Trustee Professor of Law Emeritus at the University of Pennsylvania Law School, where he taught from 1994 to 2005, and the Thomas E. Miller Distinguished Professor of Law Emeritus at the University of California's Hastings College of the Law. He was also Sterling Professor Emeritus of Law at Yale Law School.

== Biography ==
Hazard was born in Cleveland, Ohio, and raised in Kirkwood, Missouri. He graduated Phi Beta Kappa from Swarthmore College with a B.A. in 1953, and received his LL.B. in 1954 from Columbia Law School, where he was Reviews Editor of the Columbia Law Review.

Hazard was Trustee Professor of Law Emeritus at the University of Pennsylvania Law School, where he taught from 1994 to 2005.

From 1984 until 1999, Hazard served as Director of the American Law Institute (ALI). In that capacity, he was responsible for supervising the launch of the third series of the Restatements of the Law, which continues to the present. He has been credited by ALI with coming up with the idea of breaking up the larger Restatements (Torts and Property) into smaller pieces to be analyzed one at a time in Restatement Third. As Director Emeritus, he continued to serve on the Institute's council.

Hazard was a leading expert in the fields of civil procedure and legal ethics. His treatise, Civil Procedure (5th ed. 2001, with Fleming James Jr. and John Leubsdorf), is a mainstay of American legal education. He continued to write prodigiously including the ALI/UNIDROIT Principles of Transnational Civil Procedure which upon approval by the sponsoring organizations has become a model of civil procedure for international commercial disputes, and many articles, particularly on joinder, including class actions, and discovery. His casebook, Pleading and Procedure: State and Federal (9th ed. 2005, with Colin Tait, William A. Fletcher and Stephen Bundy), is widely used in American law schools. In professional ethics, his book, Legal Ethics: A Comparative Study (with Angelo Dondi) compares ethics in the legal professions of modern industrialized countries. He is also author of The Law of Lawyering (3rd ed. 2000, with William Hodes, and, after 2007, Peter R. Jarvis), a treatise on legal ethics that is updated annually. He often acted as an expert witness in both fields.

Among Hazard's better-known students is current US Supreme Court Justice Samuel Alito. Alito also worked as Hazard's research assistant when he taught at Yale.

He taught at U.C. Berkeley's Boalt Hall and at the University of Chicago Law School.

From 1980 to 1981 he also served as the 2nd Dean of the Yale School of Management, succeeding the former SEC Chairman and US Under Secretary of State, Bill Donaldson, who was the inaugural Dean.

He has been granted honorary doctor of law degrees by Gonzaga University (1985), University of San Diego (1985), Swarthmore College (1988), Illinois Institute of Technology (1990), Nova University (1992), and Republica Italiana (faculta di Urbino) (1998).

== Books ==
- Research in Civil Procedure (1963; Walter E. Meyer Research Institute of Law)
- Law in a Changing America (1968; editor)
- Quest for Justice (1973; editor, American Bar Association)
- Going to Law School? (1974; editor, with Thomas Ehrlich)
- Civil Procedure (5th ed. 2001, with Fleming James Jr. and John Leubsdorf)
- Ethics in the Practice of Law (1978)
- Pleading & Procedure, State & Federal (9th ed. 2005; with D. W. Louisell, Colin Tait and Wm. Fletcher)
- Managing Complex Litigation: A Practical Guide to the Use of Special Masters (1983; with Wayne Brazil and Paul Rice)
- The Legal Profession: Responsibility and Regulation (3d ed. 1994; editor, with Deborah Rhode)
- The Law of Lawyering: A Handbook on the Model Rules of Professional Conduct (3d ed. 2000, with annual supplements; with William Hodes and Peter Jarvis)
- Perspectives on Civil Procedure (1987; editor, with Jan Vetter)
- Board Games: The Changing Shape of Corporate Power (1988; with Arthur Fleisher Jr. and Miriam Z. Klipper)
- The Law and Ethics of Lawyering (4th ed. 2005; with Susan Koniak, Roger Cramton and George Cohen)
- American Civil Procedure: An Introduction (1993, with Michele Taruffo)
- Professional Responsibility and Regulation (Foundation Press, 2002) (with Deborah Rhode)
- Legal Ethics: A Comparative Study (Stan. U. Press.2004) (with Angelo Dondi)

=== Translations ===
- La Giustizia Civile Negli Stati Uniti (1993; with Michele Taruffo)
- Pokus`Eni` Spra `Ni` Chi Rad (Prague, 1996; translation of BOARD GAMES, with Arthur Fleisher Jr. and Miriam Z. Klipper)
- American Civil Procedure: An Introduction (Japanese ed., Tanabe Tr. 1997)

== Professional awards and honors ==
- Research Award, American Bar Foundation, 1985
- William Keck Foundation Award, American Bar Foundation, 1997
- Medal for Excellence, Columbia University School of Law Association, 1999
- Outstanding Contributions to Promoting Effective Administration of Justice, American Judicature Society, 1999
- Ceremony of Salute, Superior Court of Pennsylvania, 1999
- Elected member of the American Philosophical Society, 2003
- Gold Medal, International Insolvency Institute, 2004
- Kutak Award, American Bar Association Section of Legal Education, 2005
- Michael Franck Professional Responsibility Award, American Bar Association Center for Professional Responsibility, 2008

Academic offices
Preceded by Herbert Wechsler	Director of the American Law Institute; 1984–1999	Succeeded by Lance Liebman
