= The Children's Storefront =

Defunct school in New York, USA

Coordinates: 40.807725°N 73.937696°W

The Children's Storefront was a tuition-free private school in Harlem, founded in 1966 by the poet Ned O'Gorman. It was the subject of a 1988 documentary film, The Children's Storefront, nominated for an Academy Award for Best Documentary Short.
