= Alasdair Roberts (academic) =

Canadian academic (born 1961)

Alasdair S. Roberts
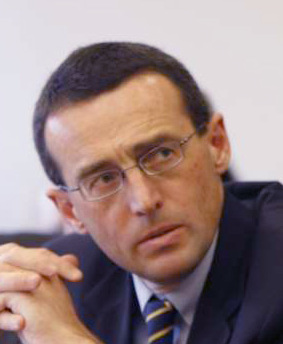
- Roberts in 2008
- Born: 1961 (age 64–65); New Liskeard, Ontario, Canada
- Education: Queen's University; University of Toronto Law School; Harvard Kennedy School
- Scientific career
- Fields: Administrative law, public policy, government secrecy, governmental reform

Alasdair S. Roberts (born 1961) is a Canadian professor at the School of Public Policy, University of Massachusetts Amherst, and author of articles and books on public policy issues, especially relating to government secrecy and the exercise of government authority.

== Education ==
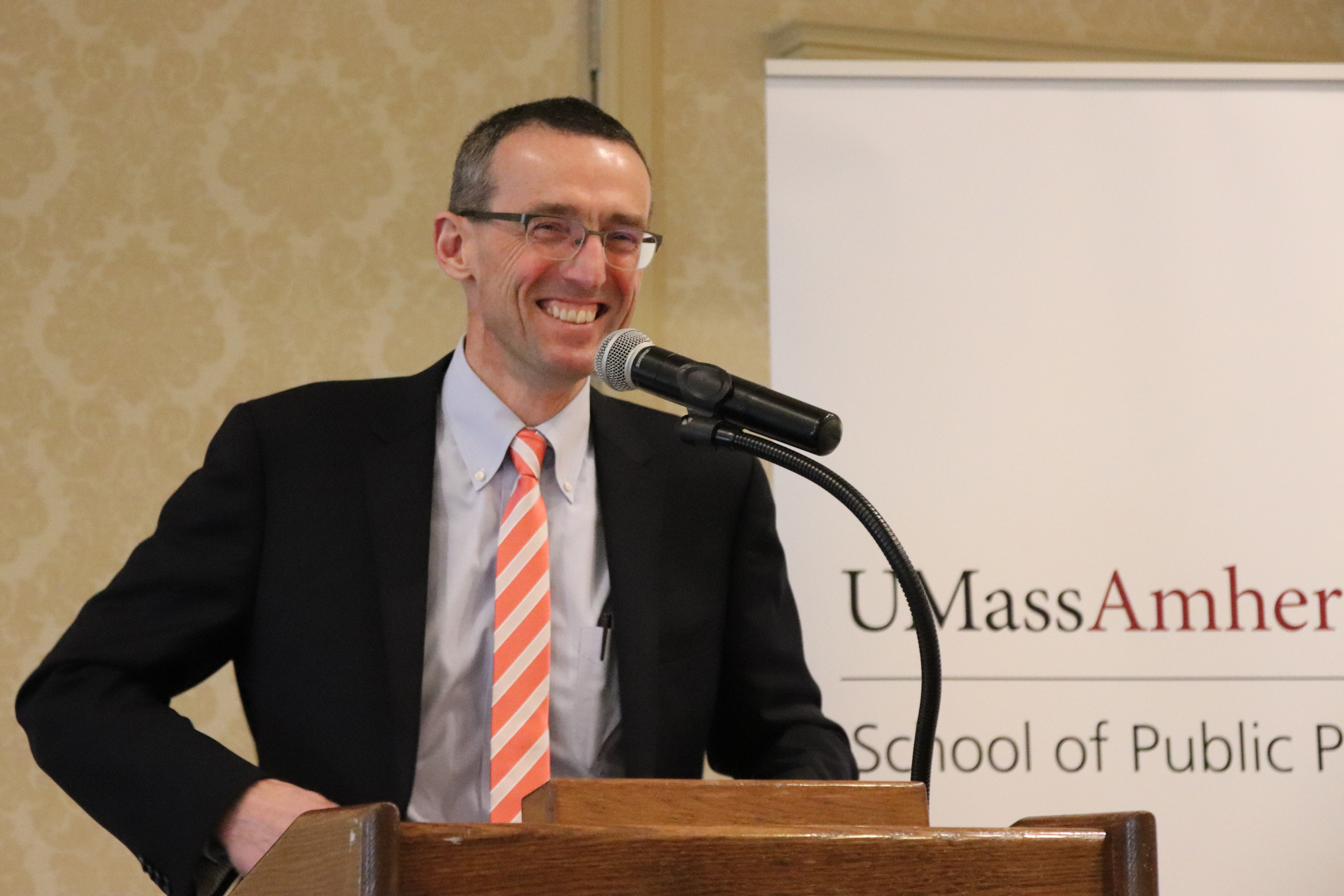
Roberts at the graduation ceremony of the School of Public Policy at the University of Massachusetts Amherst in 2019

Alasdair Roberts was born in New Liskeard, Ontario, Canada and grew up in Pembroke, Ontario, Canada, where he graduated from Fellowes High School. He began his BA in politics at Queen's University in 1979. He received a JD from the University of Toronto Faculty of Law in 1984, a master's degree in public policy from the Harvard Kennedy School at Harvard University in 1986, and a Ph.D. in public policy from Harvard University in 1994.

== Academic career ==
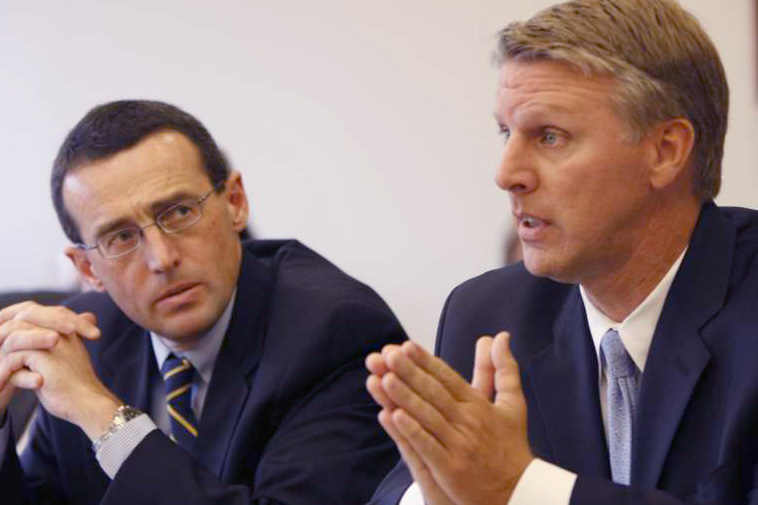
Massachusetts Treasurer Tim Cahill (right) and Roberts on a roundtable discussion at the Rappaport Center for Law and Public Policy at Suffolk University Law School in October 2008

In 2017, Roberts was appointed as a professor of political science and director of the School of Public Policy at the University of Massachusetts Amherst. He completed his term as director of the School of Public Policy in 2022.

From 2015 to 2017, Roberts was a professor of public affairs in the Truman School of Public Affairs at the University of Missouri. From 2008 to 2014, Roberts was the Jerome L. Rappaport Professor of Law and Public Policy at Suffolk University Law School. He was also Faculty Director of the Rappaport Center for Law and Public Service. Before that, he was a professor of public administration in the Maxwell School of Citizenship and Public Affairs at Syracuse University, and also Director of the Campbell Public Affairs Institute at the Maxwell School. Until 2001, he was an associate professor in the School of Policy Studies at Queen's University, and also served as associate director of the School from 1993 to 1995.

He is also a Fellow of the National Academy of Public Administration. Previously he was a public member of the Administrative Conference of the United States, an Honorary Senior Research Fellow of the Constitution Unit, School of Public Policy, University College London, and co-editor of the journal Governance. In 2022-23 he was the Jocelyne Bourgon Visiting Scholar at the Canada School of Public Service.

He received the Grace-Pépin Access to Information Award in 2014 for his research on open government. In 2022 he received the Riggs Award for Lifetime Achievement in International and Comparative Public Administration from the American Society of Public Administration. His book The Adaptable Country was a finalist for the 2025 Shaughnessy Cohen Prize for Political Writing. In 2026, he received the Kenneth Kernaghan Award for Excellence in Research from the Canadian Association for Programs in Public Administration.

He has been cited in publications including The Boston Globe, The Christian Science Monitor, The San Diego Union-Tribune, The Times (London), Prospect, and the National Journal. His essays have appeared in numerous periodicals in the United Kingdom, Canada, the United States, and elsewhere, including The Guardian, Foreign Affairs, Foreign Policy, Government Executive, Prospect, The Globe and Mail (Toronto), Dnevnik, Saturday Night, and The Washington Post.

== Political experience ==
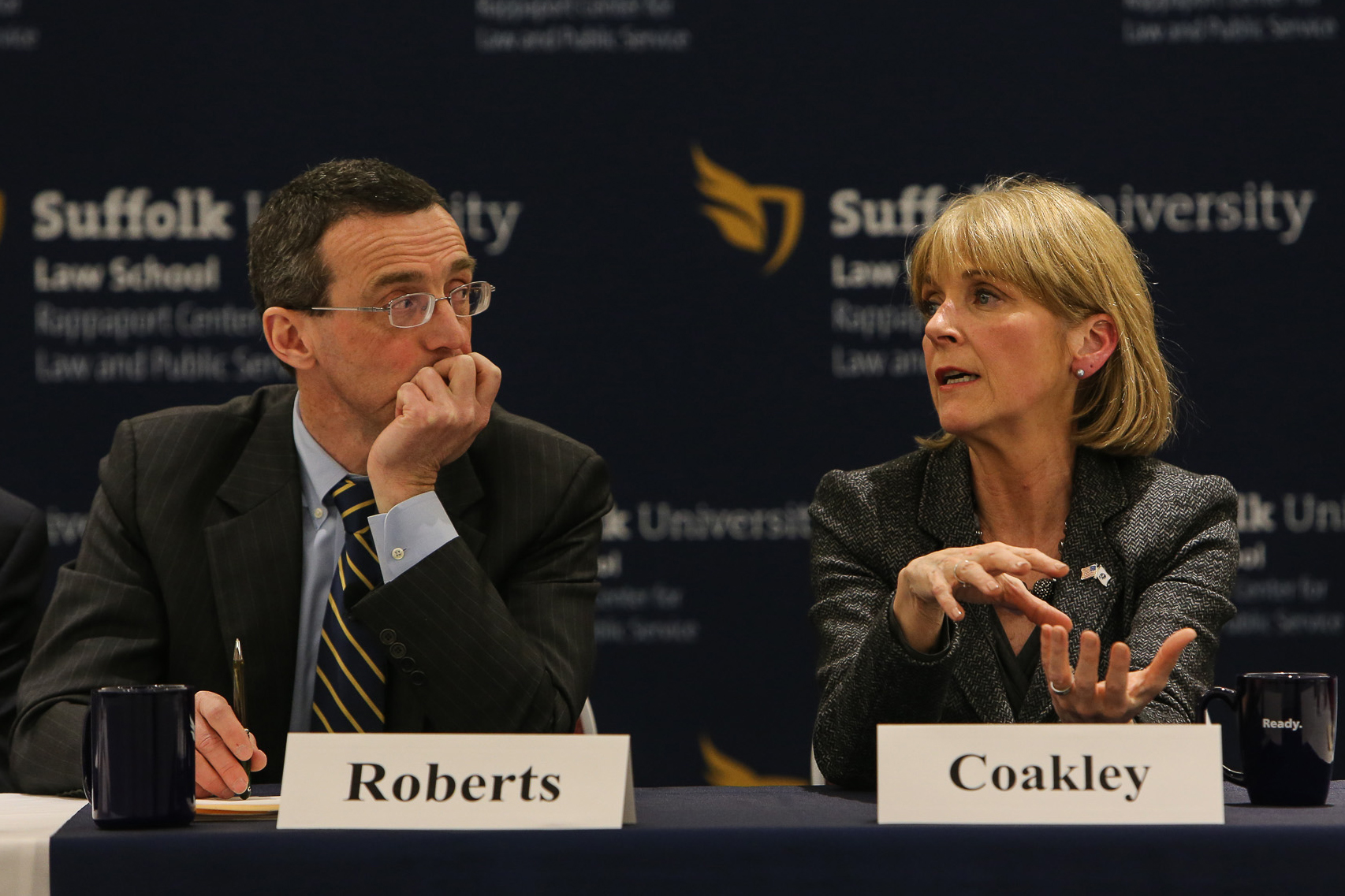
Roberts and Massachusetts Attorney General Martha Coakley at the Rappaport Center for Law and Public Service in February 2014

Roberts was a vice-president of the Progressive Conservative Party of Ontario from 1982 to 1984, during the Big Blue Machine era. He was a member of the executive for the youth wing of the party from 1980 to 1982. He was an ex officio delegate to the federal Progressive Conservative leadership election of 1983 where he supported David Crombie.

== Books ==
- The Adaptable Country: How Canada Can Survive the Twenty-First Century, McGill-Queen's University Press, 2024. Finalist for the 2025 Shaughnessy Cohen Prize for Political Writing.
- Superstates: Empires of the Twenty-First Century, Polity Books, 2023.
- Strategies for Governing: Reinventing Public Administration for a Dangerous Age, Cornell University Press, published in 2019, which received the 2021 book award from the Section on Public Administration Research of the American Society for Public Administration;
- Can Government Do Anything Right? Polity Books, published in 2018;
- Four Crises of American Democracy: Representation, Mastery, Discipline, Anticipation, Oxford University Press, published in 2017;
- The End of Protest: How Free Market Capitalism Learned to Control Dissent, published in 2013;
- America's First Great Depression: Economic Crisis and Political Disorder after the Panic of 1837, published in 2012;
- The Logic of Discipline: Global Capitalism and the Architecture of Government, published in 2010, which received an honorable mention from the book award committee of the Section on Public Administration Research of the American Society for Public Administration;
- The Collapse of Fortress Bush: The Crisis of Authority in American Government, published in 2008;
- Blacked Out: Government Secrecy in the Information Age, published in 2006, which received the 2006 Louis Brownlow Book Award from the National Academy of Public Administration, the 2007 book award from the Section on Public Administration Research of the American Society for Public Administration, the 2007 Best Book Award of the Academy of Management's Public and Nonprofit Division, and the 2007 Charles Levine Memorial Book Prize of the International Political Science Association's Research Committee on the Structure of Government.
