= The Children's Storefront (film) =

1988 film

- Directed by: Karen Goodman
- Produced by: Karen Goodman; Toby Shimin
- Cinematography: Terry Hopkins; John Lindley; Buddy Squires
- Edited by: Toby Shimin; Mark Weingarten
- Production companies: Simon & Goodman Picture Company
- Distributed by: Direct Cinema
- Release date: 1988
- Running time: 14 minutes
- Country: United States
- Language: English

The Children's Storefront is a 1988 American short documentary film about The Children's Storefront, an independent tuition-free school in Harlem set up in 1966 to help underprivileged children get a better education. Directed by Karen Goodman, it was nominated for an Academy Award for Best Documentary Short.

The film was produced with donated services and unused film stock ends Goodman procured from production companies. It was broadcast in May 1988 on American Playhouse.
