= Rappaport Institute for Greater Boston =

Research center at Harvard University

Coordinates: 42.371°N 71.122°W

- Founder: Harvard Kennedy School
- Established: 2000
- Mission: To improve the governance of Greater Boston by strengthening connections between the region's scholars, students, and civic leaders.
- Director: Edward Glaeser
- Key people: Jeffrey Liebman, Director
- Address: 15 Eliot Street; Cambridge, Massachusetts 02138
- Website: Official website

The Rappaport Institute for Greater Boston is a research and policy center housed at the Harvard Kennedy School at Harvard University in Cambridge, Massachusetts. The director is Jeffrey B. Liebman, a professor of economics at Harvard University.

== History ==
The Rappaport Institute began operations in 2000 under the leadership of Professor Alan Altshuler, the faculty director, and Charles Euchner, the executive director.

The Rappaport Institute developed an ambitious set of programs for research, public service, lectures and conferences, executive training, and information. The institute produced two comprehensive overviews of public policy in the region, studies of housing regulation, home rule, the economic drivers of growth, government management tools like CitiStat, public transit, parks management, and more.

Each academic year, the Institute funds 12 Rappaport Public Policy Fellows, who are graduate students from Boston-area universities studying policy-related topics, providing funding for 10-week internships at government and public service entities in the Boston area. Law students are eligible for a separate Rappaport Fellowship in Law and Public Policy administered by the Institute's sister institution, the Rappaport Center for Law and Public Service at Suffolk University.

The Institute also supports courses, the development of teaching materials, and encourages faculty and student research on issues of importance for Greater Boston. In addition, the Institute sponsors public events, maintains an online database on scholarly research about the region, and produces publications that summarize new scholarly research. The Institute also houses the Rappaport Urban Scholars program, which since 1981 has provided local elected and appointed officials with scholarships to Harvard Kennedy School’s mid-career master's degree program.
